= De Mar y Río =

Colombian band

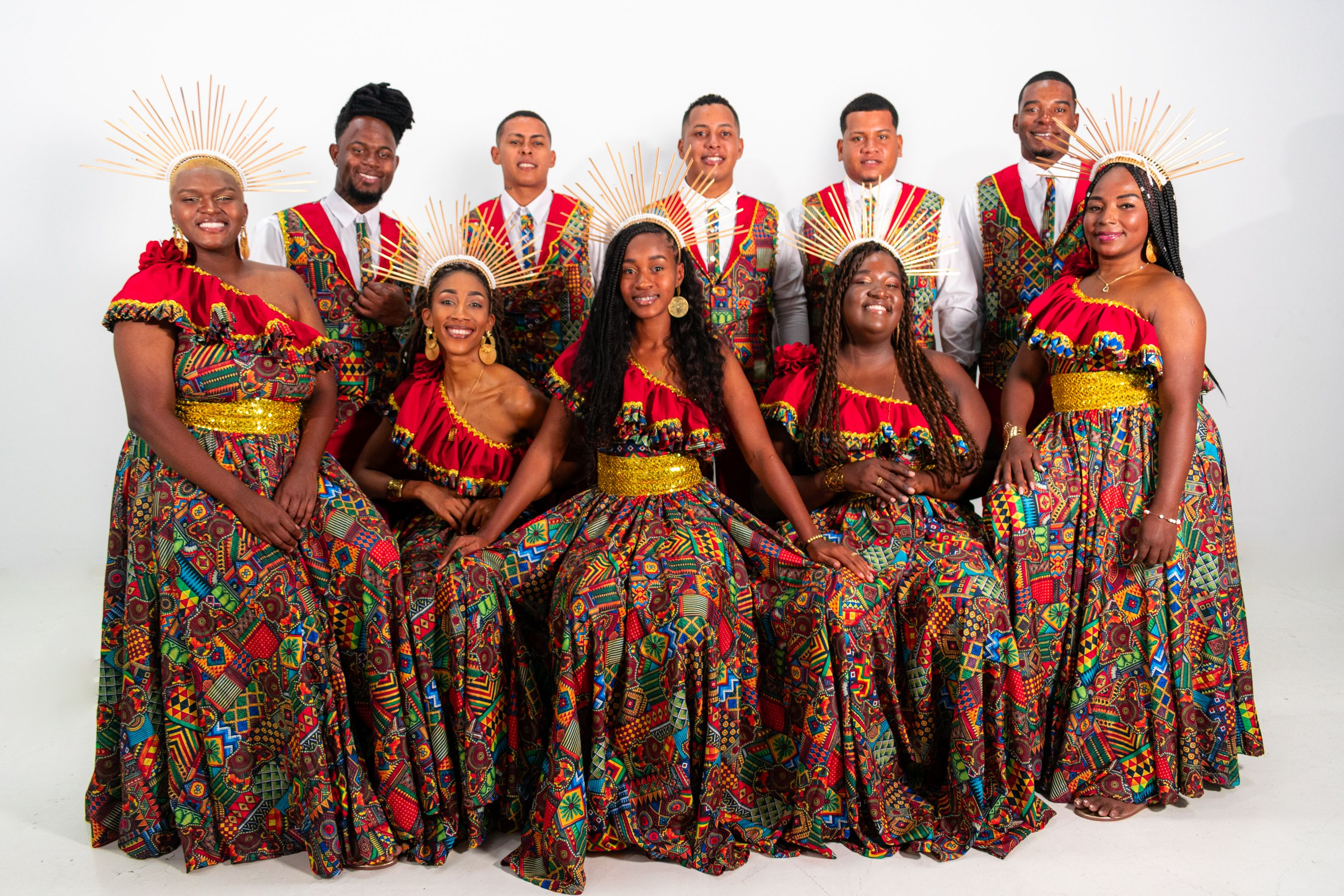

Background information
- Origin: Cali, Colombia
- Years active: 2018–present

De Mar y Río (Spanish for "of sea and river") are a Colombian band, who formed at the Fundación Escuela Canalón in Cali in 2018. They released their first two albums in 2024, and the same year won the marimba competition of the Petronio Álvarez Festival.

== History ==
The members of De Mar y Río met in 2014 at the Fundación Escuela Canalón, the school founded by Nidia Góngora in Cali, in the Colombian department of Valle del Cauca. In 2018 they formed the group at the school, and in February 2021 they changed their name to De Mar y Río after the Canalón de Timbiquí album of the same name. The members of De Mar y Río come from various places in the Pacific region of Colombia, including Cali, Timbiquí, Guapi, Iscuandé, El Charco, López de Micay, Buenaventura, and Juanchaco.

De Mar y Río released their debut album Bailen y Gocen in 2024; it was recorded at the "312 Récords" studio of Universidad Icesi, and mixed by Diego Gómez of Llorona Records. De Mar y Río were able to record Bailen y Gocen after winning one of the 100 grants offered by Yuri Buenaventura's Crea Sonidos program. Many of the tracks on the album were written by Ceferina Gómez, a songwriter from Timbiquí, and arranged by the band. Later in 2024, De Mar y Río released the album El Club de Alabaos del Pacífico, a tribute to the alabaos, a style of funeral music from Chocó that is traditionally sung a cappella by women.

De Mar y Río came third in the marimba competition of the 2022 Petronio Álvarez Festival. They won the same competition at the 2024 Festival. In 2025 they played at Estéreo Picnic and toured several cities in Canada. De Mar y Río's third album Cantaré was recorded in 2025 at the Universidad Icesi and released in May 2026. Some of the tracks are traditional, and others are recent compositions by members of the band and by songwriters including Yamile Cortés of Semblanzas del Río Guapi and Elena Hinestroza.

== Albums ==
- Bailen y Gocen (2024)
- El Club de Alabaos del Pacífico (2024)
- Cantaré (2026)
