= Guapi =

Guapi may refer to:

- Guapi, Cauca, a town in the Cauca Department, Colombia
- Guapi Island, in Ranco Lake, southern Chile
- Guapi River, a river in the Cauca Department, Colombia
