= Festival Estéreo Picnic =

Music festival in Bogotá, Colombia

Estéreo Picnic Festival

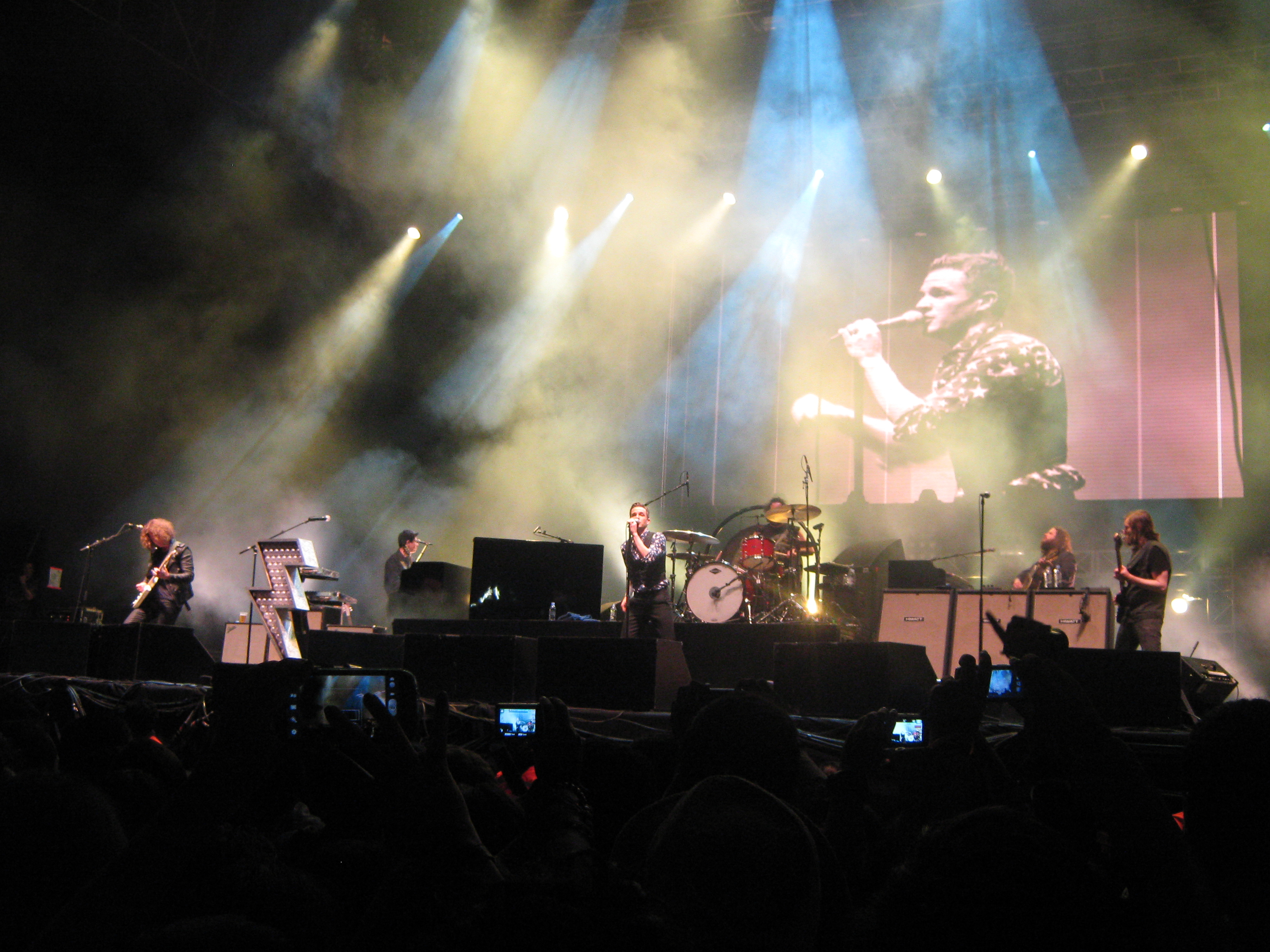
- The Killers at Estéreo Picnic, 2013
- Genre: Alternative rock, punk rock, reggae, electronica, hip hop
- Frequency: Annually
- Locations: Bogotá, Colombia
- Years active: 16
- Inaugurated: 24 April 2010
- Most recent: 27 March 2025 – 30 March 2025
- Attendance: ~63,000 (2016)
- Website: www.festivalestereopicnic.com

Estéreo Picnic is a music festival that takes place annually in Bogotá, Colombia. It began in 2010 as a one-day festival showcasing mainly Colombian artists, but low turnout and financial losses during its first three years resulted in a strategic change of direction in 2013, becoming a multi-day festival on a bigger site and inviting major international bands to play alongside artists from Colombia and other Latin American countries. As a result, attendance increased markedly and Estéreo Picnic is now Colombia's biggest alternative music festival and one of the most important music festivals in South America. The musical style of the festival is similar to that of Lollapalooza and European festivals such as Glastonbury, focusing on alternative rock, indie music, punk rock, reggae, electronica and hip hop. Among the acts to have played at Estéreo Picnic since 2013 are American artists The Killers, Red Hot Chili Peppers, Pixies, Nine Inch Nails, Kings of Leon, Jack White, and Snoop Dogg, British groups Gorillaz, New Order, Foals, Kasabian, Mumford & Sons, and Florence and the Machine, and Australian bands Empire of the Sun and Tame Impala. The festival has also featured many of the major groups of the Latin American alternative music scene, including Calle 13, Babasónicos, Café Tacuba, Los Fabulosos Cadillacs, and Aterciopelados, as well as sets from high-profile DJs and dance acts such as Deadmau5, Tiësto, Skrillex, Major Lazer, and Calvin Harris.

== History ==
The festival was the brainchild of four Colombian friends, Sergio Pabón, Santiago Vélez, Julián Martínez and Julio Correal, who came up with the idea of holding a festival of alternative music in Bogotá after discussing similar festivals that they had attended abroad. Recruiting three more acquaintances, Juan David Shool, Philippe Siegenthaler and Gabriel García, the seven founded a company, Sueño Estéreo (Stereo Dream), to put on the festival. The first edition of Estéreo Picnic was held on 24 April 2010 and featured mostly Colombian acts, headed by American rapper Matisyahu and Belgian dance act 2manydjs. However, the festival attracted fewer than 3000 people. In 2011 and 2012 the promoters more than doubled the number of acts appearing, but attendance was still low, with 4500 people turning up in 2011 and 6000 in 2012. The promoters made a loss of US$80,000 on the 2011 festival, and US$200,000 on the 2012 festival, with the festival only surviving by being subsidised by the money made on other concerts put on by the promoters.

Faced with continuing losses, the promoters took the decision that they needed a major headlining act to boost ticket sales. They booked the Killers, whose debut concert in Colombia in 2009 had attracted 10,000 people, as well as other major supporting acts including New Order and Café Tacuba, and reduced ticket prices by 25%. The organisers hoped that with this new strategy they would sell 18,000 tickets compared with the previous year's 6000: in the event the 2013 festival was attended by 23,324 people. Attendance has since increased every year: the 2015 festival had an attendance of 50,133 and the 2016 edition was attended by an estimated 63,000 people.

== Line-ups by year ==
=== 2010 ===
The first edition of the festival took place on 24 April 2010.

- Matisyahu
- 2manydjs
- Instituto Mexicano del Sonido
- Bomba Estéreo
- The Hall Effect
- Superlitio
- Palenke Soultribe
- Profetas
- Alerta
- La Makintouch
- Afrolatina
- Pizarro (LSCFJ)
- Radio Rebelde Soundsystem

=== 2011 ===
The 2011 edition of the festival took place on 9 April 2011.

Estéreo Stage:

- The Presets
- Calle 13
- CSS
- ChocQuibTown
- Zoé
- The Sounds
- Hercules and Love Affair
- The Mills
- Monsieur Periné
- Providencia
- Radio Rebelde
- Alfonso Espriella
- Remaj7

El Tiempo Stage:

- The Twelves
- Bag Raiders
- Frente Cumbiero
- Jiggy Drama
- Modex
- Profetas
- Revolver
- Ciegossordomudos
- V for Volume
- Reino del Mar
- Purple Zippers
- LSCFJ
- Sexy Lucy
- Frankie ha Muerto
- Bendito

=== 2012 ===
The 2012 edition of the festival took place on 30 March 2012.

Estéreo Shock Stage:

- Cassius
- MGMT
- TV on the Radio
- Superlitio
- Yuksek
- Tinie Tempah
- Crew Peligrosos
- Planes
- Soundacity
- Copyright?
- Resina Lalá

Picnic Stage:

- Los Amigos Invisibles
- Gentleman
- Caifanes
- Monsieur Periné
- Systema Solar
- Toy Selectah
- Tres Coronas
- Dënver
- De Bruces a Mi
- La Makina del Karibe
- Armando Quest
- Globos de Aire

=== 2013 ===
The 2013 edition of the festival took place on 5 and 7 April 2013. It was the first edition of the festival to take place over more than one day, and the first in its new venue of the Parque Deportivo, which has remained its home ever since.

Friday 5 April

Picnic Stage:

- Steve Aoki
- Foals
- Two Door Cinema Club
- Vetusta Morla
- Silencio No Hay Banda
- León Larregui
- Diamante Eléctrico

Sunday 7 April

Estéreo Stage:

- The Killers
- New Order
- Café Tacuba
- Passion Pit
- Carla Morrison
- Juan Cirerol
- Esteman
- Meridian Brothers

Picnic Stage:

- Crystal Castles
- Major Lazer
- Pernett
- Ondatrópica
- Alcolirycoz
- Planes
- Panorama
- Mr. Bleat
- Banda Radioacktiva

=== 2014 ===
The 2014 edition of the festival took place from 3 to 5 April 2014.

Thursday 3 April

Tigo Music Stage:

- Nine Inch Nails
- Babasónicos
- Julian Casablancas
- Mateo Lewis

Caracol Stage:

- Phoenix
- Capital Cities
- Portugal. The Man
- Dorian
- Árbol de Ojos

Friday 4 April

Tigo Music Stage:

- Red Hot Chili Peppers
- Zoé
- Pixies
- Natalia Lafourcade
- Monsieur Periné
- Juan Pablo Vega

Caracol Stage:

- Empire of the Sun
- Vampire Weekend
- Cut Copy
- AFI
- Savages
- Injury

Saturday 5 April

Tigo Music Stage:

- Tiësto
- Los Fabulosos Cadillacs
- Gogol Bordello
- Bomba Estéreo
- The Wailers
- Cultura Profética
- Camila Moreno
- Antombo
- Oh'laville

Caracol Stage:

- Axwell
- Zedd
- Jovanotti
- La 33
- Gerard
- RVSB
- Lospetitfellas
- Charles King
- Consulado Popular
- Lianna
- El Freaky

=== 2015 ===
The 2015 edition of the festival took place over 12–14 March 2015. The festival was expanded to include a third stage, the Club Social Music Stage dedicated to DJs and dance music.

Thursday 12 March

Tigo Music Stage:

- Jack White
- Foster the People
- The Kooks
- Telebit

Caracol Stage:

- Skrillex
- SBTRKT
- Astro
- Pedrina & Río
- 424

Club Social Music Stage:

- Designer Drugs
- Mitú
- La Tostadora
- El Mató a un Policía Motorizado
- Planes
- Grupo de Expertos Solynieve
- Tan Tan Morgán

Friday 13 March

Tigo Music Stage:

- Kings of Leon
- Aterciopelados
- Damian Marley
- alt-J
- Superlitio
- Milmarías

Caracol Stage:

- Major Lazer
- Kasabian
- Rudimental
- Puerto Candelaria
- Herencia de Timbiquí
- Rancho Aparte
- Danicattack

Club Social Music Stage:

- Seth Troxler
- Chet Faker
- Guberek
- Slow Hands
- Mavidip & Steinlausky
- Balancer
- Okraa
- DMK

Saturday 14 March

Tigo Music Stage:

- Andrés Calamaro
- Calvin Harris
- Miami Horror
- Draco Rosa
- SOJA
- Quique Neira
- Lion Reggae

Caracol Stage:

- Los Amigos Invisibles
- Mala Rodríguez
- Systema Solar
- Compass
- Crew Peligrosos
- Ciegossordomudos
- Elsa y Elmar
- Reyno
- Fatso

Club Social Music Stage:

- Deep Dish
- Crew Love (No Regular Play, Nick Monaco, Soul Clap)
- Ulises Hadjis
- Salt Cathedral
- Caloncho
- Andrés Correa
- Federico Franco

=== 2016 ===
The 2016 edition of the festival took place from 10 to 12 March 2016. It was preceded by an "inauguration party" in the evening of 9 March at the Bogotá music venue Armando Music Hall, featuring a live set by Eagles of Death Metal. The 2016 festival gained some unexpected international publicity after one of its invited artists, the American rapper Snoop Dogg, mistakenly tagged himself on his Instagram account as being in Bogata, Romania, instead of Bogotá.

Thursday 10 March

Tigo Music Stage:

- Mumford & Sons
- Tame Impala
- Of Monsters and Men
- 1280 Almas

Huiwei Stage:

- Die Antwoord
- Odesza
- Bad Religion
- Albert Hammond Jr.
- The Kitsch

Pepsi Music Stage:

- A-Trak
- The Joy Formidable
- La Minitk del Miedo
- Ela Minus
- El Otro Grupo
- Electric Mistakes

Friday 11 March

Tigo Music Stage:

- Florence and the Machine
- Noel Gallagher's High Flying Birds
- Alabama Shakes
- Ximena Sariñana
- Oh'laville

Huiwei Stage:

- Zedd
- Duke Dumont
- Jungle
- Walk the Moon
- Vicente García
- Revolver Plateado

Pepsi Music Stage:

- Jamie Jones
- Patrick Topping
- Christina Rosenvinge
- Francisca Valenzuela
- Unknown Yet
- Little Jesus
- Los Pirañas
- Ismael Ayende

Saturday 12 March

Tigo Music Stage:

- Snoop Dogg
- Jack Ü
- The Flaming Lips
- Seeed
- Lospetitfellas
- Tarmac

Huiwei Stage:

- Kygo
- Sidestepper
- MNKYBSNSS
- Onda Vaga
- Nelda Piña & La Boa
- Sultana

Pepsi Music Stage:

- Alvvays
- Nicolas Jaar
- Nicola Cruz
- Lunate
- Kanaku y El Tigre
- Goli
- Xavier Martinex

=== 2017 ===
The 2017 edition of the festival took place from 23 to 25 March 2017.

Thursday 23 March

- The Weeknd
- Justice
- The XX
- Rancid
- Cage The Elephant
- G-Eazy
- Glass Animals
- Bob Moses
- Damian Lazarus
- Aj Dávila
- Seis Peatones
- Manook y El Ultimo Esquimal
- Sagan
- Popstitute
- Julio Garces

Friday 24 March

- The Strokes
- Flume
- Two Door Cinema Club
- Caribou
- Silversun Pickups
- Claptone: Immortal Live
- Vance Joy
- Catfish and The Botlemen
- Zalama Crew
- Rawayana
- Arbol de Ojos
- Rat Race
- Cocononó
- Los Makenzy
- Gordon
- N. Hardem
- Los Hot Pants
- Adi

Saturday 25 March

- Deadmau5
- Martin Garrix
- Wiz Khalifa
- Sublime with Rome
- Richie Hawtin
- Toto la Momposina
- Gus Gus
- Quantic
- Chancha Vía Circuito
- Bazurto All Stars
- Nawal
- Mateo Kingman
- Julio Victoria
- Elkin Robinson
- Cero 39
- Romperayo
- Ali A.K.A Mind
- Canalón de Timbiquí
- Buendía

=== 2018 ===
The 2018 edition of the festival has been confirmed to take place from 23 to 25 March 2018.

Friday 23 March

- The Killers
- Lana Del Rey
- Dillon Francis
- Metronomy
- Tyler, the Creator
- The Neighbourhood
- Milky Chance
- Sofi Tukker
- Thomas Jack
- La chiva Gantiva
- Mnkybsnss
- Centayrys
- Tribu Baharú
- Surcos
- La Ramona
- Saail
- Esteban Copete y su Kinteto Pacífico
- Cohetes

Saturday 24 March

- Gorillaz
- Hardwell
- Bomba Estéreo
- De la Soul
- Galantis
- Mac Demarco
- Ondatrópica
- Kali Uchis
- Dengue Dengue Dengue
- Crew Peligrosos
- La Máquina Camaleón
- N.A.A.F.I
- Moügli
- Alfonso Espriella
- Dany F
- Cynthia Montaño
- Ácido Pantera
- Bleepolar

Sunday 25 March

- LCD Soundsystem
- Dj Snake
- Zoé
- The National
- Royal Blood
- The Black Madonna
- Ow Wonder
- La vida Boheme
- Buscabulla
- Diamante Eléctrico
- Technicolor Fabrics
- Charles King
- Telebit
- La Boa
- Salomón Beda
- Aberlado Carbonó
- Pablo Trujillo
- Tomas Station
- Salvador y el Unicornio

=== 2019 ===
The 2019 edition of the festival took place from 5 to 7 April 2019.

Friday 5 April

Tigo Stage:

- The Kitsch
- Alcolirykoz
- Interpol
- Twenty One Pilots
- Kendrick Lamar

Adidas Stage:

- Usted Señalemelo
- Ximena Sariñana
- Esteman
- Cuco
- Years & Years
- Rüfüs Du Sol

Axe Stage:

- Silvina Moreno
- Mabiland
- ha$lopablito
- Rap Bang Club
- Mula
- Khruangbin
- Don G
- Jon Hopkins

Budweiser dome:

- Anti
- DJ. Cas
- Las Hermanas
- Debit
- Cayetano
- Kenny Larkin

Saturday 6 April

Tigo Stage:

- TSH Sudaca
- Rhye
- Portugal. The Man
- Grupo Niche
- Underworld

Adidas Stage:

- Alejandro y María Laura
- Apache
- FIDLAR
- Zhu
- Disclosure
- Tiësto

Axe Stage:

- Absalón y Afropacífico
- Pedrina
- Erlend Øye and 'la Comitiva'
- La Payara
- Mitú
- Cerrero
- Nicola Cruz

Budweiser dome:

- Juana Valeria
- Kat
- Leeon
- Volvox
- Defuse
- DJ. Pierre

Sunday 7 April

Tigo Stage:

- Nicolás y Los Fumadores
- Bajo Tierra
- The 1975
- Sam Smith
- Arctic Monkeys

Adidas Stage:

- Arrabalero
- Da Pawn
- Irie Kingz
- St. Vincent
- Foals
- Odesza

Axe Stage:

- Montaña
- Las Yumbeñas
- Margarita Siempre Viva
- Quemarlo todo por error
- Los Espíritus
- Carlos Sadness
- Seun Kuti & Fela's Egypt 80
- DJ Koze

Budweiser dome:

- Stay at Home
- Aletti' S 72
- Dorado
- Project Pablo
- Nuclear Digital Transistor
- Soul Clap

=== 2020 ===
The 2020 edition of the festival was due to take place from 3 to 5 April 2020. The site for the festival this year was moved further north of Bogota to the Briceño 18 golf course in the municipality of Sopó. On 30 January 2020, it was announced that the Wu-Tang Clan would be surprise special guests on the Saturday. However, on 13 March it was announced that the festival had been postponed due to the coronavirus pandemic, and had been rescheduled for 4 to 6 December 2020. On 4 September 2020, it was announced that the 2020 event would not take place, and had been rescheduled for 10 to 12 September 2021.

=== 2022 ===
The 2022 edition of the festival took place from 25 to 27 of March 2022.

Foo Fighters' drummer Taylor Hawkins died on 25 March 2022, hours before the band were scheduled to perform on the first night of the Festival. The festival stage in which Foo Fighters were scheduled to perform that night was turned into a candlelight vigil for Hawkins.

=== 2023 ===
The 2023 edition of the festival took place from 23 to 26 March 2023.

=== 2024 ===
The 2024 edition of the festival took place from 21 to 24 March 2024. For the first time, the festival was not held outside of Bogota, but in the Simón Bolívar Park in the center of the city.

== See also ==
- List of festivals in Colombia
