= Day of the Little Candles =

Traditional holiday in Colombia

Día de las velitas Little Candles Day or Immaculate Conception Eve
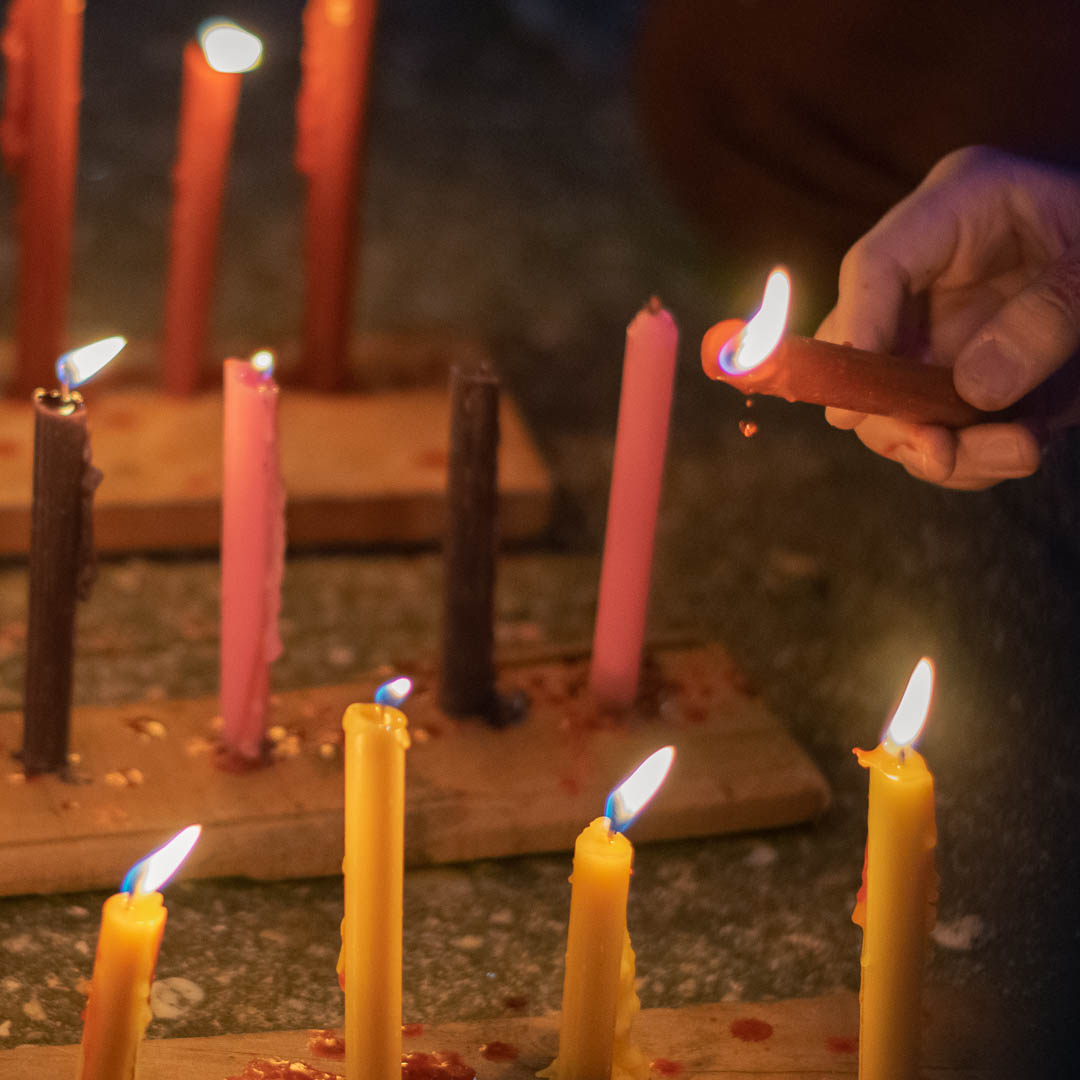
- Official name: Day of the Immaculate Conception
- Observed by: Colombia
- Type: State and religious
- Celebrations: Lighting of candles and lanterns
- Observances: Various religious processions
- Begins: Sundown December 7
- Ends: Sunrise December 8
- Date: December 7
- Next time: 7 December 2026
- Frequency: annual
- Related to: Christmas in Colombia

Little Candles Day or Immaculate Conception Eve (Spanish: Día de las velitas) is a widely observed religious holiday in Colombia, celebrated on December 7, the eve of the Feast of the Immaculate Conception, which is a public holiday in Colombia. This day is the unofficial start of the Christmas season in the country, although the official day is First Advent Sunday (between November 27 and December 3).

On this night, people place candles and paper lanterns in places where they can be seen, in honor of the Immaculate Conception of the Virgin Mary. On December 8 it is not mandatory to work, and it is customary for houses to fly a white flag with the image of the Virgin Mary all day. They also hold numerous events, from fireworks shows to competitions.

== Background ==
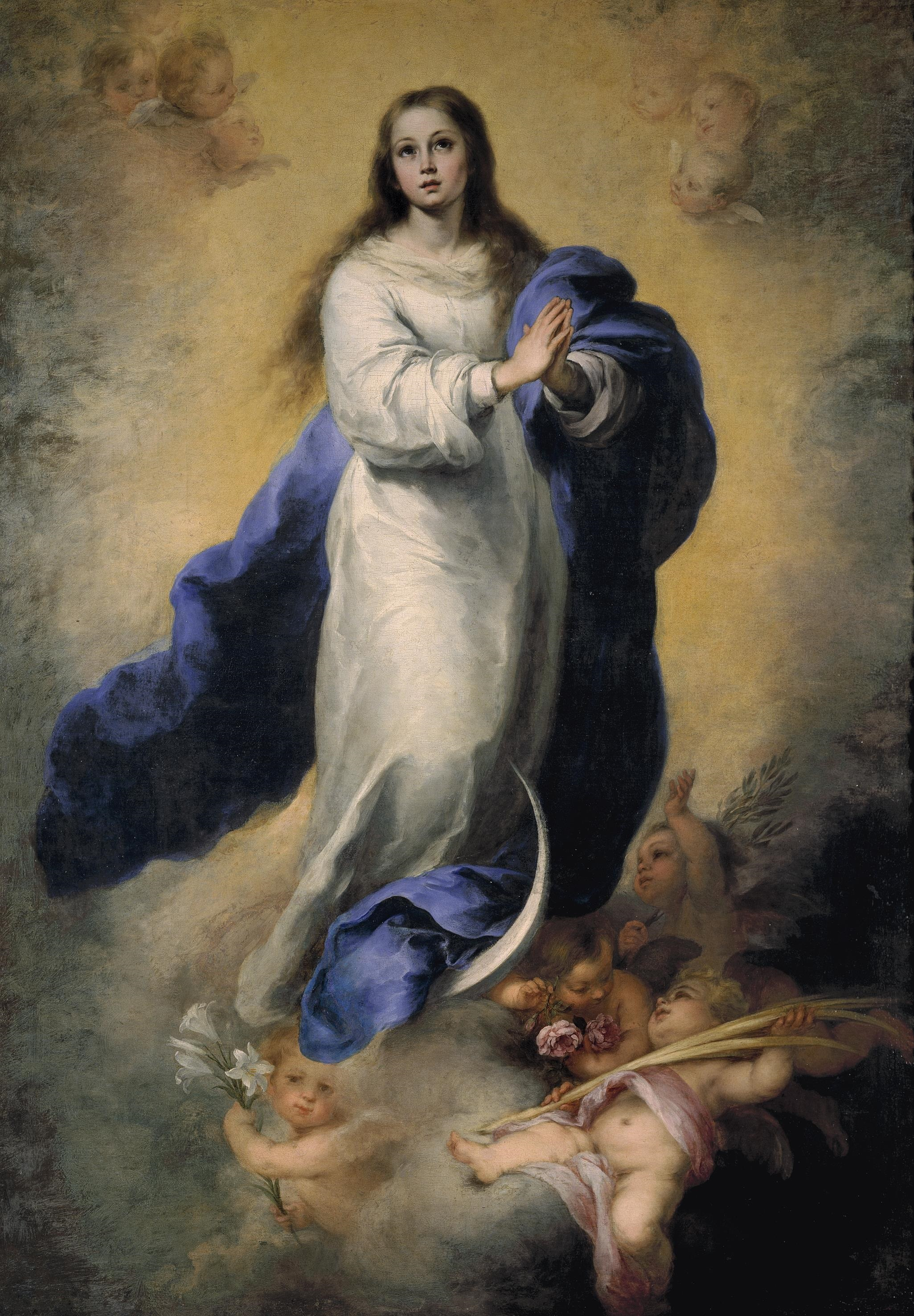
Mary, mother of Jesus, as the Immaculate Conception. Bartolomé Esteban Murillo. Museo del Prado.

The celebration of the Night of the Little Candles dates to December 7, 1854, when Pope Pius IX defined as dogma the Immaculate Conception of the Virgin Mary, published in his Apostolic constitution Ineffabilis Deus. In Colombia, as in many other places, this announcement was observed by lighting candles. The Catholic Church of Colombia kept alive the celebration and made an annual tradition of lighting candles on the night of December 7.

Some places in Colombia celebrate the night of the little candles several nights before December 8, particularly in the Paisa region. This is believed to derive from a Jewish hanukkah tradition, since a large number of paisas are of Jewish descent.

== See also ==
- Novena
