= Canalón de Timbiquí =

Colombian musical group

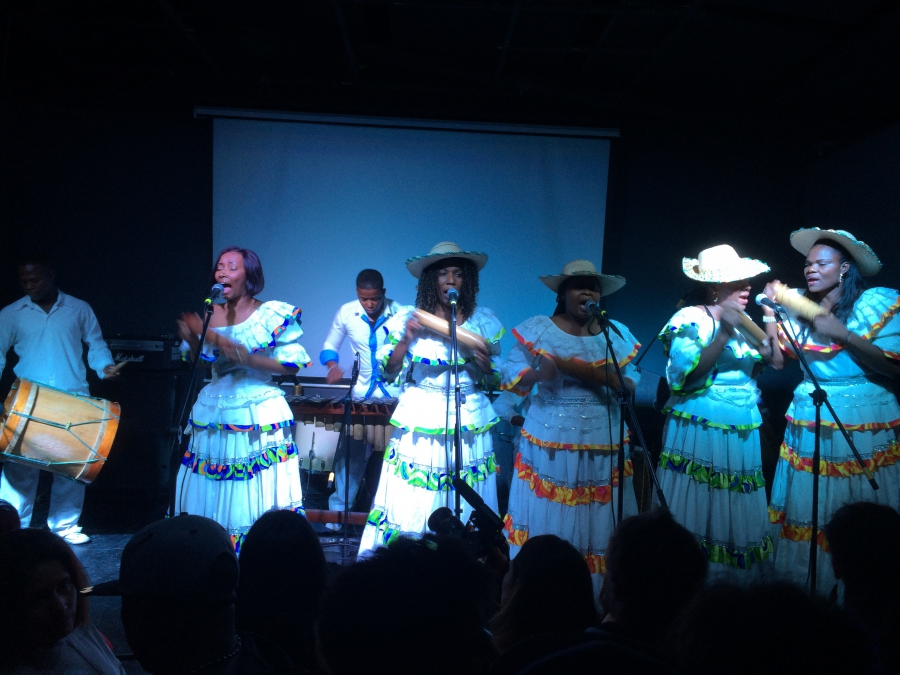
- Canalón de Timbiquí performing in 2016

Background information
- Origin: Timbiquí, Colombia
- Years active: 2001–present

Canalón de Timbiquí are a band from the Pacific coast of Colombia. They have released four albums, most recently the Latin Grammy-nominated De Mar y Río in 2019, and have toured in the Americas and Europe.

== History ==
Nidia Góngora formed Canalón de Timbiquí in 2001, as a "branch" of a group called Canalón that she had been a part of while at school in Timbiquí. Canalón was created by Elizabeth Sinisterra, a school teacher, together with Góngora's mother Oliva Bonilla, initially as a way of introducing the children to the traditional rhythms of currulao and arrullo.

In 2004, Canalón de Timbiquí released their debut album Déjame Subí, which was followed by the album Una Sola Raza in 2011. Their third album Arrullando was released in 2016, and won Best Folk Album (Spanish: mejor disco folclor) at the Premios Shock that year.

Canalón de Timbiquí's most recent album is De Mar y Río, which was released in 2019 on Llorona Records, and was nominated for a Latin Grammy Award for Best Folk Album at the 20th Latin Grammy Awards. Appearing on the album are 14 musicians and several well-known singers from the Colombian Pacific, including Olivia Bonilla, Emeterio Balanta, Modesta Torres, and Ninfa Ocoró.

Canalón de Timbiquí have toured in the Americas and Europe.

== Albums ==
- Déjame Subí (2004)
- Una Sola Raza (2011)
- Arrullando (2016)
- De Mar y Río (2019)

== See also ==
- De Mar y Río – marimba band from Cali named after Canalón de Timbiquí's 2019 album
