= Lucrecia Panchano =

Colombian poet (born c.1940)

Lucrecia Panchano (born c. 1940) is a Colombian poet. Her poems, written in the costumbrista style, are considered important historical records for Colombia's Pacific region, because they narrate the cultural traditions of the region's African-descendant population.

== Biography ==
Lucrecia Panchano was born around 1940, perhaps as early as 1935, in Guapi, Colombia. She was raised by her maternal grandmother and did not have contact with her mother throughout her childhood and adolescence. She completed her primary studies at the Immaculate Conception School in Guapi. At just 13 years old, Pachano was chosen to be a rural teacher and sent to work in the Emberá indigenous community, where she taught people to read. She continued to teach there for approximately six years.

In 1954, she moved to the Valle del Cauca department in search of her biological mother. There, she married and had two children. After returning to Guapi for a year after separating form her husband, in 1960 she was hired to work as a radio operator for Puertos de Colombia, a company in the port city of Buenaventura.

Her literary career began in 1965, when she began publishing poems in the newspaper El Puerto. In 1970, she won first prize in a contest focused on customs of Colombia's Pacific region, for which she presented a work on life in the Cholo indigenous community. She continued writing stories and poems for various newspapers and magazines in Cali and Buenaventura, and in 1982 she retired from Puertos de Colombia and moved to Cali, where she continued her literary work. Having never attended college, Panchano considered doing so after her retirement, but she decided against it, noting: "I have already graduated from the university of life."

In 2004, Panchano published her first book, titled Resonancias de un churo, for which she received honorable mentions from the Cali Municipal Comptroller and the University of Valle. She was invited by the prime minister of Spain at the time, José Luis Rodríguez Zapatero, to release the book there, where she held an event for members of the African-descendant community at the headquarters of the Spanish Socialist Workers' Party.

Her 2007 book Ecos de mi litoral was honored with the Helcías Martán Góngora Medal of Merit in Poetry from the Fundación Colonia Bonaverence. She also received the Palma de Oro for Merit in Ancestral Heritage from the Fundación Ancestros in 2008. Her most recent book, published in 2010, is Hurgando en mis ancestros, a work aimed especially at children with the goal of teaching them Afro-Colombian traditions.

Panchano's poetry makes evident her opposition to racism and war. It also deals with the struggles of the Afro-descendent population, the history and culture of the Pacific region, and the author's own feelings and experiences.

Pachano continues to live and work in Cali, along with her husband, her four children, and dozens of grandchildren and great-grandchildren. She is an active member of the Red Nacional de Mujeres Afrocolombianas-kambirí, a national network of Afro-Colombian women.

== Selected works ==
- Resonancias de un churo (2004)
- Ecos de mi litoral (2007)
- Hurgando en mis ancestros (2010)
