= Nidia Góngora =

Colombian singer and songwriter

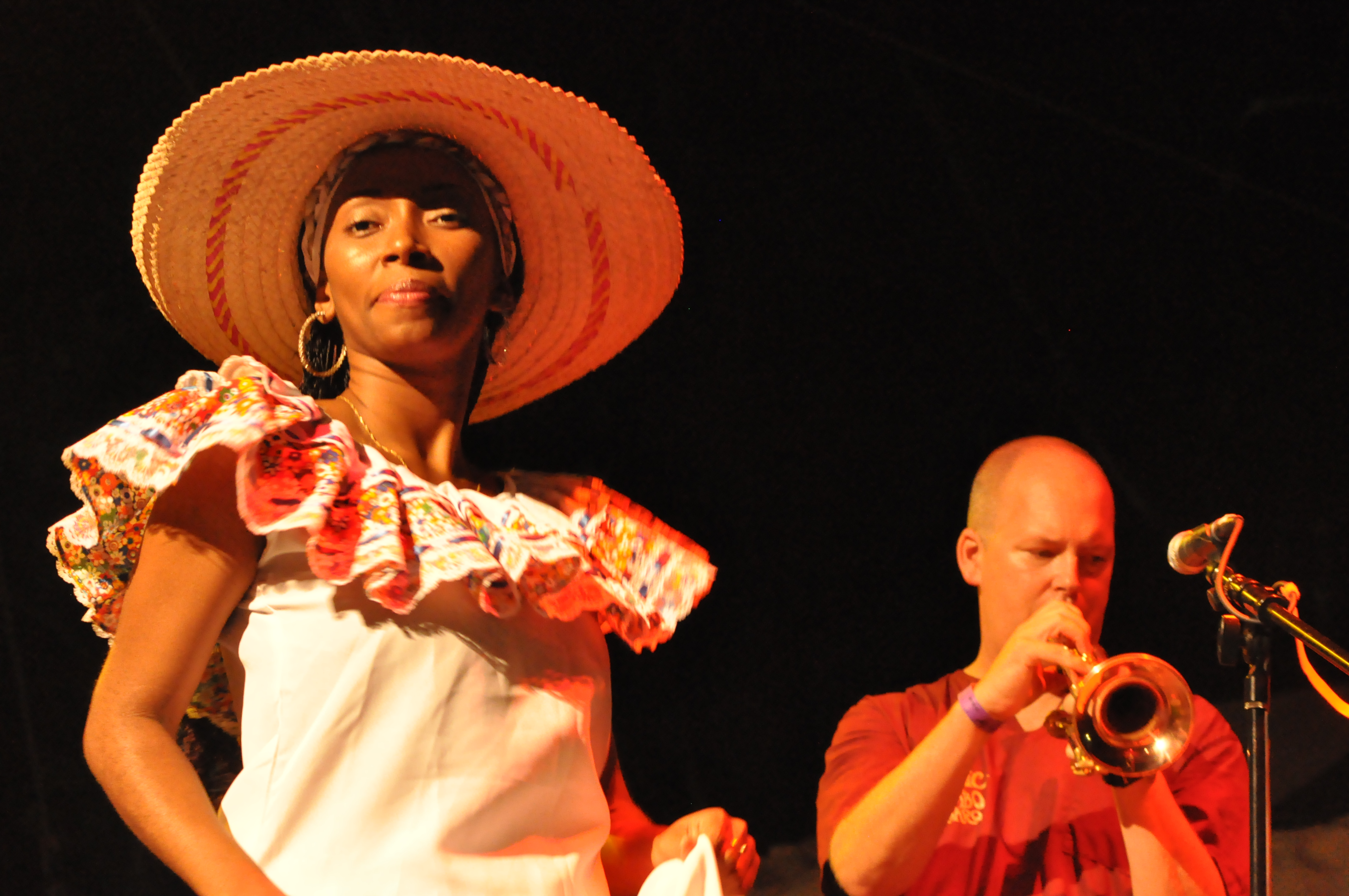
- Góngora performing with Quantic and His Combo Bárbaro in 2009

Background information
- Born: Nidia Sofía Góngora Bonilla; 1979 or 1980 (age 45–46); Timbiquí, Colombia
- Years active: 2001–present
- Member of: Canalón de Timbiquí; Ondatrópica

Nidia Sofía Góngora Bonilla (Note: In this Spanish name, the first or paternal surname is Góngora and the second or maternal family name is Bonilla.) (born 1979 or 1980) is a Colombian singer and songwriter. Góngora writes and sings in traditional styles of music from the Colombian Pacific. She has released several albums with her group Canalón de Timbiquí and as a solo artist, most recently Pacífico Maravilla in 2025.

== Biography ==
Nidia Sofía Góngora Bonilla was born in 1979 or 1980 in Timbiquí, in the Colombian department of Cauca. She was born in the house of her grandparents, who named her after Nydia Quintero Turbay, at that time the First Lady of Colombia. Góngora's mother Libia Oliva Bonilla was a well-known singer in Timbiquí.

Góngora leads the band Canalón de Timbiquí, which she formed in 2001 as a "branch" of a group called Canalón that she had been a part of while at school in Timbiquí. With Canalón de Timbiquí she has released four albums: Déjame Subí (2004), Una Sola Raza (2011), Arrullando (2016), and De Mar y Río (2019), which was nominated for a Latin Grammy Award for Best Folk Album. Góngora founded the music school Fundación Escuela Canalón in Cali, which was the meeting place of the group De Mar y Río, who named themselves after the Canalón de Timbiquí album.

Since 2011, Góngora has collaborated with English musician Quantic. They have released two albums together, Curao (2017) and Almas Conectadas (2021). Góngora and Quantic are also both members of Ondatrópica, alongside Mario Galeano of Frente Cumbiero, which project has released two albums: Ondatrópica (2012) and Baile Bucanero (2017). Góngora has also recorded with The Bongo Hop, Alé Kumá, and La Pacifican Power.

In 2025, Góngora independently released the album Pacífico Maravilla. The album includes a version of "Insistencia", a poem written and performed by Shirley Campbell Barr. Góngora announced in January 2026 that she would be founding her own record label, Positivo Records, whose first two releases were Pacífico Maravilla and Llegó la Alborada, the debut album of Alborada de Timbiquí.

== Musical style ==
Góngora writes and sings songs in traditional styles from the Colombian Pacific. She was introduced to the cantora tradition of the region by her mother, about which she says "the role of the cantoras is to be guardians and transmitters of a whole tradition, they are responsible for transmitting from generation to generation all the knowledge of ancestry, not only the topics related to music".

== Awards and recognition ==
In 2019, Góngora was named Afro-Colombian of the Year (Spanish: Afrocolombiana del Año) in the category of Music and the Arts by El Espectador and the Fundación Color de Colombia. In 2023, a species of orchid was named Lepanthes nidiagongorana in her honour.

== Albums ==
- Curao (2017), with Quantic
- Almas Conectadas (2021), with Quantic
- Pacífico Maravilla (2025)

=== With Canalón de Timbiquí ===
- Déjame Subí (2004)
- Una Sola Raza (2011)
- Arrullando (2016)
- De Mar y Río (2019)

=== With Ondatrópica ===
- Ondatrópica (2012)
- Baile Bucanero (2017)
