= Gorgona Island (Colombia) =

Pacific island of Colombia

Gorgona National Natural Park
- IUCN category II (national park)
- Map of the island

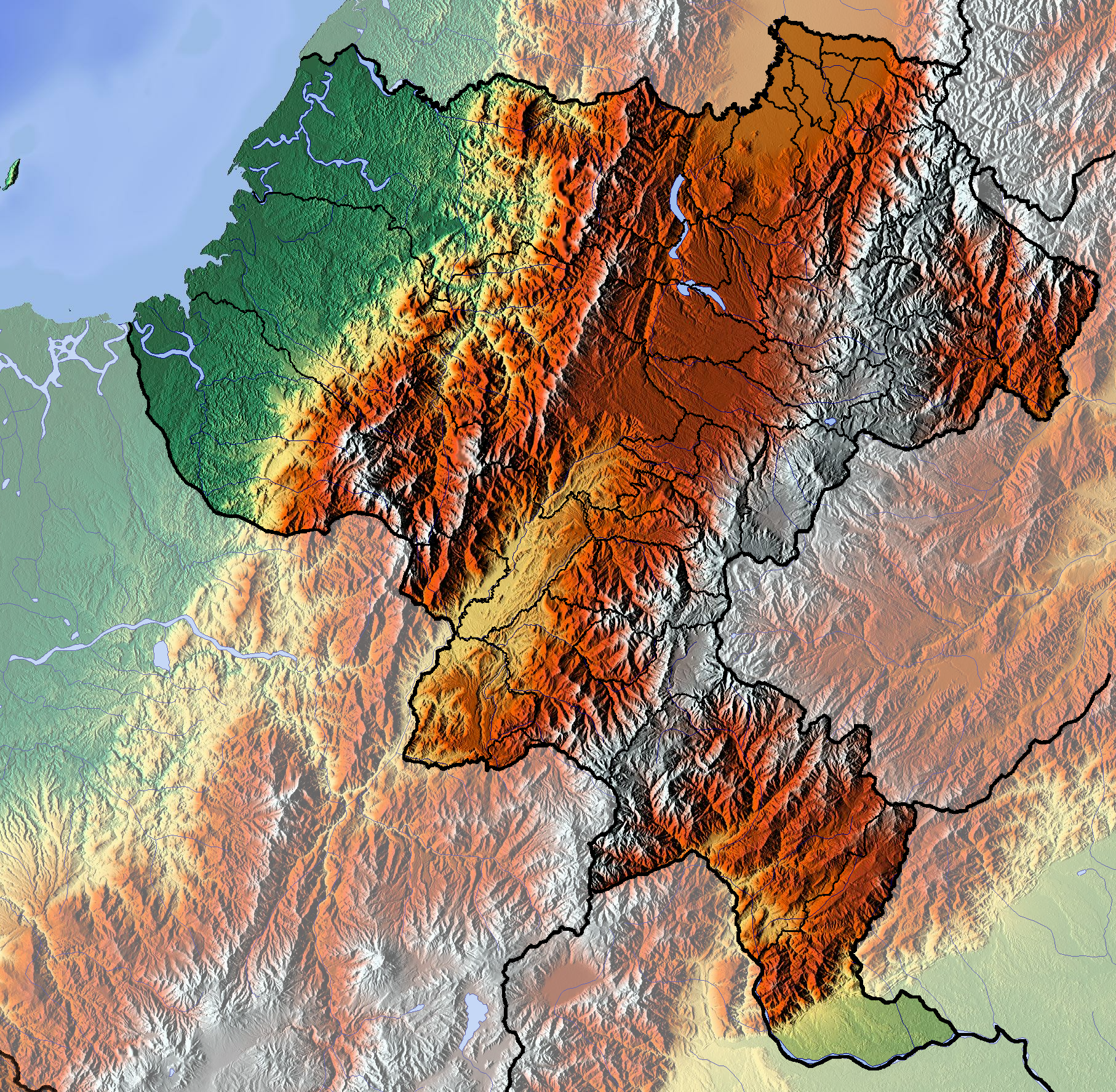
- Location within Cauca Department Location within Colombia
- Location: Pacific Ocean
- Nearest city: Guapi, Cauca
- Coordinates: 02°58′03″N 78°10′49″W
- Area: 620 km^{2} (240 sq mi) marine 13 km^{2} (5.0 sq mi) land
- Established: 1984
- Governing body: SINAP

Gorgona is a Colombian island in the Pacific Ocean situated about 28 km (17 mi) off the Colombian Pacific coast. The island is 9 km (5.6 mi) long and 2.5 km (1.6 mi) across at its widest, with a maximum height of 338 m (1,109 ft) and a total area of 13 km^{2} (5.0 sq mi). Gorgona is separated from the continent by a 270 m (890 ft) deep underwater depression.

Administratively, the island is part of the Municipality of Guapi in the Department of Cauca. Gorgona functioned as a prison from 1959 until 1984 when it was turned into a National Natural Park. The island, noted for its many endemic species and unique ecosystems, was established as Gorgona Island National Park in 1985, in order to preserve its richly varied wildlife of the sub-tropical forest and the coral reefs offshore.

== History ==
=== Early settlements ===
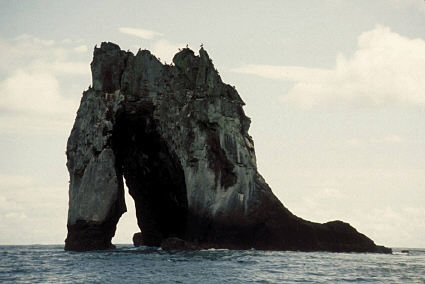
El Viudo - rock formation south of Gorgona

Gorgona was first inhabited by people possibly associated with the Tumaco-Tolita culture. The indigenous Guna people of Urabá (Colombia) and Guna Yala (Panama), have the tradition of being the first settlers of the island. They left archeological remains dating back to 1300 AD. They were expert sailors and lived by farming and fishing. They also worked with stone tools and were goldsmiths.

Spanish conquistadors first visited Gorgona in 1524, led by Diego de Almagro. He named it San Felipe. Three years later, in 1527, Francisco Pizarro, on his second expedition to Peru, arrived on the island from Gallo island, running away from the indigenous group that lived there. Pizarro and thirteen of his men remained on Gorgona for seven months, waiting for the arrival of provisions, preparing for a continuation of his efforts to conquer Peru. Pizarro, who considered the island an "inferno", gave it the name Gorgona after losing many of his men to bites from the great number of snakes that inhabit the island. The name refers to the mythical Gorgon, Medusa who had living, venomous snakes in place of hair. Bartolomé Ruiz, a Spanish boat pilot, was sent from Panama to rescue them. With Ruiz's ship as the only one at Pizarro's disposal, they all left Gorgona to conquer Peru.

In the period after the Spanish Conquest, the cacique Yundigua lived in the island. He was probably a member of the Sindagua, a people that lived between Nariño and Cauca.

In 1679, the English pirate Bartholomew Sharp, after attacking Guayaquil, took over Gorgona, calling it Captain Sharp's Island. He stayed for only a little more than a month. The island served as a refuge for the English privateers Woodes Rogers and William Dampier in 1709. The island, rich in fresh water and valuable wood, served as a supply station for ships en route from Panama to Peru and back.

During the 1820s, after the independence of Colombia from Spain, Simón Bolívar gave Gorgona to Federico D'Croz, as thanks for his military service during the Battle of Vargas Swamp. By 1870 the island was inhabited by a small mestizo community which lived by fishing. Ramon Payan bought part of the island from one of D’Croz's descendants and built a hacienda that was destroyed in 1899 during the Thousand Days' War when 1,100 members of the liberal forces stayed on the island for a little less than two weeks.

=== Penal colony ===
During the first half of the 20th century, Gorgona remained mostly uninhabited. In 1959 the island was turned into a penal colony. It became a high-security state prison housing Colombia's more violent criminals, generally those convicted of murder and rape. The penitentiary was built following the model of Nazi concentration camps. Prisoners slept on beds without a mattress or a pillow. Gorgona became known as Colombia's Alcatraz Island.

Convicts were dissuaded from escaping by the venomous snakes in the interior of the island and the sharks patrolling the stretch of water to the mainland. However, Daniel Camargo Barbosa, a psychopathic serial killer and rapist, managed to escape in November 1984. For a long time he had studied the ocean currents with the idea of escaping by sea. He constructed a small raft of logs, and a few days later arrived on the Pacific Coast.

The penal colony was closed on 25 June 1984 during the presidency of Belisario Betancur, amid pressure from human rights activists over reported abuses, and the last prisoners were transferred to the mainland. The former jail buildings have now been covered by dense vegetation, but a portion can still be seen.

=== National park ===
The island was established as Gorgona Natural National Park in 1984, in order to preserve its endemic species, the richly varied wildlife of the tropical forest and the coral reefs offshore. The park covers a total maritime area of 620 square kilometres (240 sq mi).

Gorgona has no permanent population, except for staff involved in the administration and preservation of the National Park. The island has been developed as an ecotourism center with lodgings and a restaurant. Visitors need previous permission to come to the island. Gorgona can host around 80 visitors at any given time. Camping is not allowed, and the only housing available is the one provided by the park administration in El Poblado, the only settlement area of the island. It is a very quiet place, built facing the ocean. Each group is assigned one guide upon arrival to accompany the tourists wherever the group wishes to go. Since Gorgona is a tropical environment known for its venomous snakes, visitors are not allowed to set foot anywhere unaccompanied or without wearing boots, except for the beach in front of the rooms.

== Geography ==
The island of Gorgona has a total area of 26 km^{2}. It is located 35 km from the continent in front of the Department of Cauca, separated by a 270 m deep depression. Southwest of Gorgona, there is another much smaller island called Gorgonilla. Gorgonilla has an area of 48.99 hectares ( 121.06 acres ). Gorgona and Gorgonilla are separated by the Tasca strait, which is 400 m long. Before an earthquake on 31 March 1983, it was possible to cross from Gorgona to Gorgonilla by foot during low tide.

Several rock islets are found southwest of Gorgonilla, of which the largest is called "El Viudo" (the Widower). There are other rock islets located at the northern tip of Gorgona called Rocas del Horno (Oven Rocks). They are separated from Gorgona by Bocas de Horno (Oven mouths). These rocks rise up almost vertically out of the ocean.

The terrain of Gorgona is mountainous with the highest peak, Cerro La Trinidad, at a height of 338 m (1,109 ft). As well, the backbone of the island consists of the peaks Los Micos, La Esperanza and El Mirador. Gorgonilla has a maximum height of 90 m (300 ft).

On the eastern (continental) side of the island there are white sand beaches made up of coral reef detritus. On the western (oceanic) side there are mostly cliffs battered by the sea and a couple of sandy beaches. Pizarro Beach is located on the northeastern shore and is named as such because it is believed this is where Francisco Pizarro first landed.

=== Ecosystems ===
A dense very humid jungle covers the center of the island.

=== Climate ===
The island has an average temperature of 26 degrees Celsius. With an average 90% humidity, intense rainfalls and misty days are frequent; with a calculated rain fall of 6,948.5 mm annually. Gorgona is said to have its own cloud, always looming on its mountaintop. It rains all year around, but even more so in May and June. The least rainy period is in February and March.

Climate data for Gorgona Island, elevation 10 m (33 ft), (1981–2010)
Month	Jan	Feb	Mar	Apr	May	Jun	Jul	Aug	Sep	Oct	Nov	Dec	Year
Mean daily maximum °C (°F)	29.1 (84.4)	29.5 (85.1)	29.6 (85.3)	29.8 (85.6)	29.5 (85.1)	29.0 (84.2)	29.0 (84.2)	29.1 (84.4)	28.9 (84.0)	28.8 (83.8)	28.5 (83.3)	28.5 (83.3)	29.1 (84.4)
Daily mean °C (°F)	26 (79)	26.3 (79.3)	26.3 (79.3)	26.6 (79.9)	26.5 (79.7)	26.1 (79.0)	26.1 (79.0)	26.1 (79.0)	25.9 (78.6)	25.8 (78.4)	25.8 (78.4)	25.8 (78.4)	26.1 (79.0)
Mean daily minimum °C (°F)	23.5 (74.3)	23.4 (74.1)	23.2 (73.8)	23.5 (74.3)	23.7 (74.7)	23.3 (73.9)	23.4 (74.1)	23.3 (73.9)	23.4 (74.1)	23.5 (74.3)	23.6 (74.5)	23.5 (74.3)	23.4 (74.1)
Average precipitation mm (inches)	532.2 (20.95)	316.7 (12.47)	231.7 (9.12)	427.4 (16.83)	779.5 (30.69)	852.9 (33.58)	732.9 (28.85)	613.0 (24.13)	685.4 (26.98)	720.9 (28.38)	569.0 (22.40)	504.9 (19.88)	6,788.7 (267.27)
Average precipitation days	24	18	17	22	26	27	26	24	26	25	23	23	272
Average relative humidity (%)	90	89	89	89	90	91	89	89	91	90	90	90	90
Mean monthly sunshine hours	89.9	107.3	130.2	114.0	86.8	63.0	83.7	80.6	60.0	74.4	69.0	74.4	1,033.3
Mean daily sunshine hours	2.9	3.8	4.2	3.8	2.8	2.1	2.7	2.6	2.0	2.4	2.3	2.4	2.8
Source: Instituto de Hidrologia Meteorologia y Estudios Ambientales

=== Freshwater ===
Thanks to the frequent rains and high humidity, Gorgona has a rich hydrographic system that includes a large amount of water currents flowing towards the ocean. Most of these are located on the eastern side of the island. Around 25 streams remain active all year round and 75 during the rainy season. In less than half a kilometer on the beach called La Camaronera ten creeks reach the sand. There are also two lakes on the island: La Cabrera and Tunapurí.

=== Geology ===
The youngest known komatiites on Earth are found on Gorgona. These silica-poor volcanic rocks are otherwise known almost exclusively from the Archean, but formed at Gorgona during the Cretaceous. A marine sedimentary succession spanning the Cretaceous–Paleogene boundary with a horizon containing numerous glassy spherules generated by the Chicxulub impact is found on the southern tip of Gorgonilla.

== Wildlife ==
=== Terrestrial ===
The island's dense tropical rainforest has been isolated for thousands of years from the mainland, and gives shelter to some unique species like the endemic blue anole, which is the only all-blue anole lizard in the world. Unfortunately, this species is in danger of extinction due to forest clearing during the times of the prison and by predation from the introduced western basilisk.

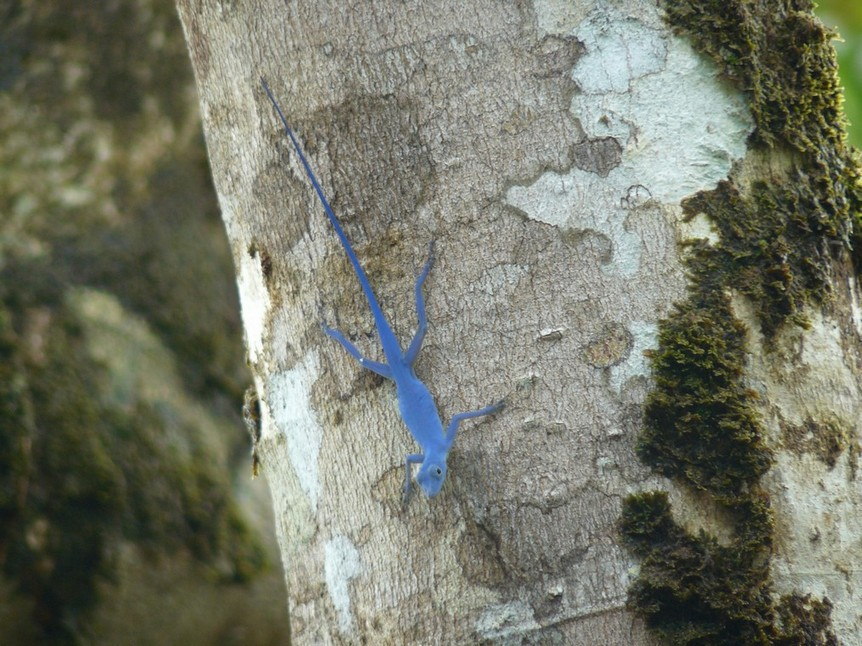
Anolis gorgonae

Gorgona is famous for its snakes. There are three known venomous snakes including the much-feared Bothrops asper and two species of coral snake: Micrurus dumerilii and Micrurus mipartitus. Several non-venomous snakes including boa constrictor, Ecuador sipo (Chironius grandisquamis), mussurana (Clelia clelia), blunthead tree snake (Imantodes cenchoa), banded cat-eyed snake (Leptodeira annulata), parrot snake (Leptophis ahaetulla), Boddaert's tropical racer (Mastigodryas boddaerti), brown vine snake (Oxybelis aeneus), Cope's vine snake (Oxybelis brevirostris), and centipede snake (Tantilla longifrontalis) also inhabit the island.

This island also has the Atelopus gracilis sub-species of the endangered Atelopus elegans the Elegant Stub-foot Toad which might be a separate species of its own.

Terrestrial mammals include the introduced Colombian white-headed capuchin, brown-throated sloth, Gorgona spiny rat and the Central American agouti. As well, there are over a dozen species of bat found on the island.

There are few species of terrestrial birds on the island, probably due to the large number of reptile predators. The most common include endemic subspecies of black-crowned antshrike (Thamnophilus atrinucha gorgonae), bananaquit (Coereba flaveola gorgonae) and red-legged honeycreeper (Cyanerpes cyaneus gigas).

=== Aquatic ===
The island is well known for the yearly passage of the humpback whale and their newborn who visit its shores from August to October during their southward migration. Furthermore, one can find hammerhead shark, whitetip reef shark, sea turtle, whale shark and moray eel in the waters around Gorgona Island.

==== Seabirds ====
The island has been designated an Important Bird Area (IBA) by BirdLife International because it supports significant populations of brown pelicans, magnificent frigatebirds and blue-footed boobies.

The brown booby breeding population nesting in Gorgona Natural National Park is small, but is the most important breeding territory for Sula leucogaster etesiaca in the world. The population of 150 pairs registered in 2002 exceeds the number of individuals in other regional localities. Brown boobies in Gorgona National Natural Park breed asynchronously; on the same date Ospina-Alvarez recorded eggs, chicks in early or youthful stages, and fledged chicks. The calculated accumulative reproductive success (17.3%) included more than 95% of all pairs breeding in 2002–2003, but this may change from year to year.
