= Semblanzas del Río Guapi =

Colombian band

- Origin: Guapi, Colombia
- Genres: Currulao
- Years active: 2009–present
- Labels: Discos Pacífico

Semblanzas del Río Guapi (Spanish for "Portraits of the Guapi River") are a Colombian band founded in Guapi in 2009. Their music is in the genre of currulao, which comes from the Pacific coast of Colombia, and they have released two albums on the record label Discos Pacífico.

== History ==
Semblanzas del Río Guapi was founded in 2009 in Guapi, in the Colombian department of Cauca, by Eder Javier Camacho, Edinson Jair Caicedo, and sisters Yamile Cortés and Marbel Cortés. Yamile and Marbel sing, alongside Yesica Montaño and Libia Sinisterra.

At the 2015 Petronio Álvarez Festival, Semblanzas del Río Guapi won the category "Marimba y Cantos Tradicionales". Their debut album Voy Pa' Allá was recorded at Universidad Icesi, and was released on record label Discos Pacífico in 2021. In 2023, Semblanzas del Río Guapi performed at Estéreo Picnic. Their second album Lindo E' was released on Discos Pacífico in 2025.

=== Outreach ===
Since 2015, Semblanzas del Río Guapi have organised music workshops for children in areas of Guapi affected by violence.

== Musical style ==
Songlines described Semblanzas del Río Guapi as "very much a traditional currulao ensemble." Currulao is a genre of music from the Pacific coast of Colombia characterised by call and response vocals accompanied by drums and marimba.

== Albums ==
- Voy Pa' Allá (2021, Discos Pacífico)
- Lindo E' (2025, Discos Pacífico)
