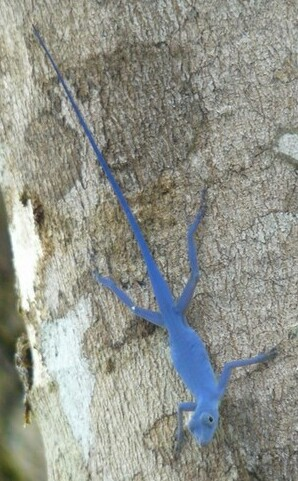

Conservation status
- Near Threatened (IUCN 3.1)

Scientific classification
- Kingdom: Animalia
- Phylum: Chordata
- Class: Reptilia
- Order: Squamata
- Suborder: Iguania
- Family: Dactyloidae
- Genus: Anolis
- Species: A. gorgonae

Binomial name
- Anolis gorgonae Barbour, 1905

Synonyms
- Anolis gorgonae Barbour, 1905; Dactyloa gorgonae — Nicholson et al., 2012

= Blue anole =

Species of lizard

The blue anole (Anolis gorgonae) is a species of lizard in the family Dactyloidae. A. gorgonae falls into the genus Dactyloa, which are all highly arboreal, but differ in size, coloration, and perch preferences. The blue anole specifically occupies higher perches. It is a small species which is "near threatened" and found only on the island of Gorgona, in the Colombian Pacific.

== Habitat ==
The preferred natural habitat of A. gorgonae is forest, at altitudes from sea level to 100 m (330 ft).

== Description ==
Both sexes of A. gorgonae are overall pure blue, which is very rare in lizards. The male's dewlap is pure white. At least some individuals have a series of darker mottled spots on the head and neck. The blue anole is unique among all anoles because of its bright blue color and its smaller size, and it is slimmer than other Dactyloa. The blue anole is mostly found within an inhabited area on the island, where it is seen to be in open branches of the trees. It also likes to be on the trunks of trees.

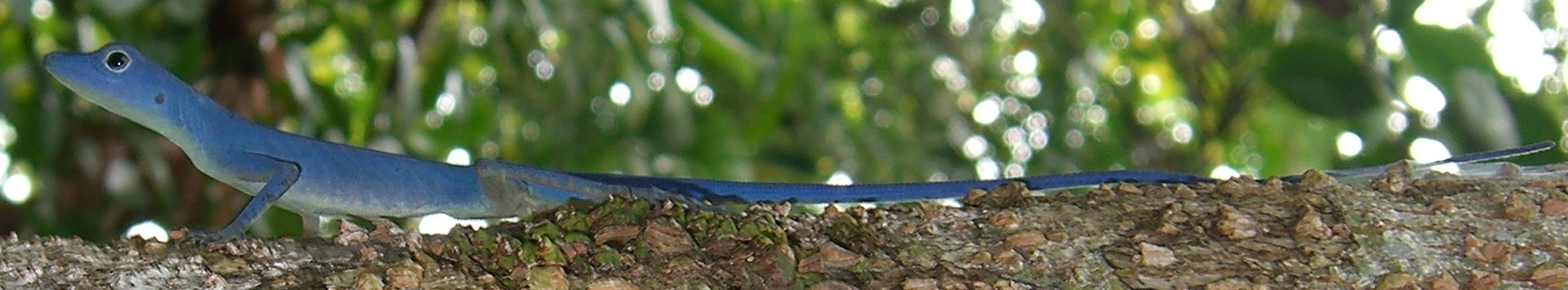
Anolis gorgonae

== Reproduction ==
A. gorgonae is oviparous.

== Conservation status ==
Due to the isolated environment and elusive nature of A. gorgonae, which mostly lives in rainforest high off the ground, it has been difficult to accurately estimate its population. It commonly falls prey to the introduced western basilisk lizard and may also fall prey to introduced rats, cats, and capuchin monkeys. The largest amount of damage to its habitat occurred when a prison was built in the 1950s, but since 1984 the entire island has been a protected national park. It has been proposed that some individuals could be captured for a captive breeding program.

== See also ==
- List of Anolis lizards
- Lygodactylus williamsi, a similar threatened lizard
