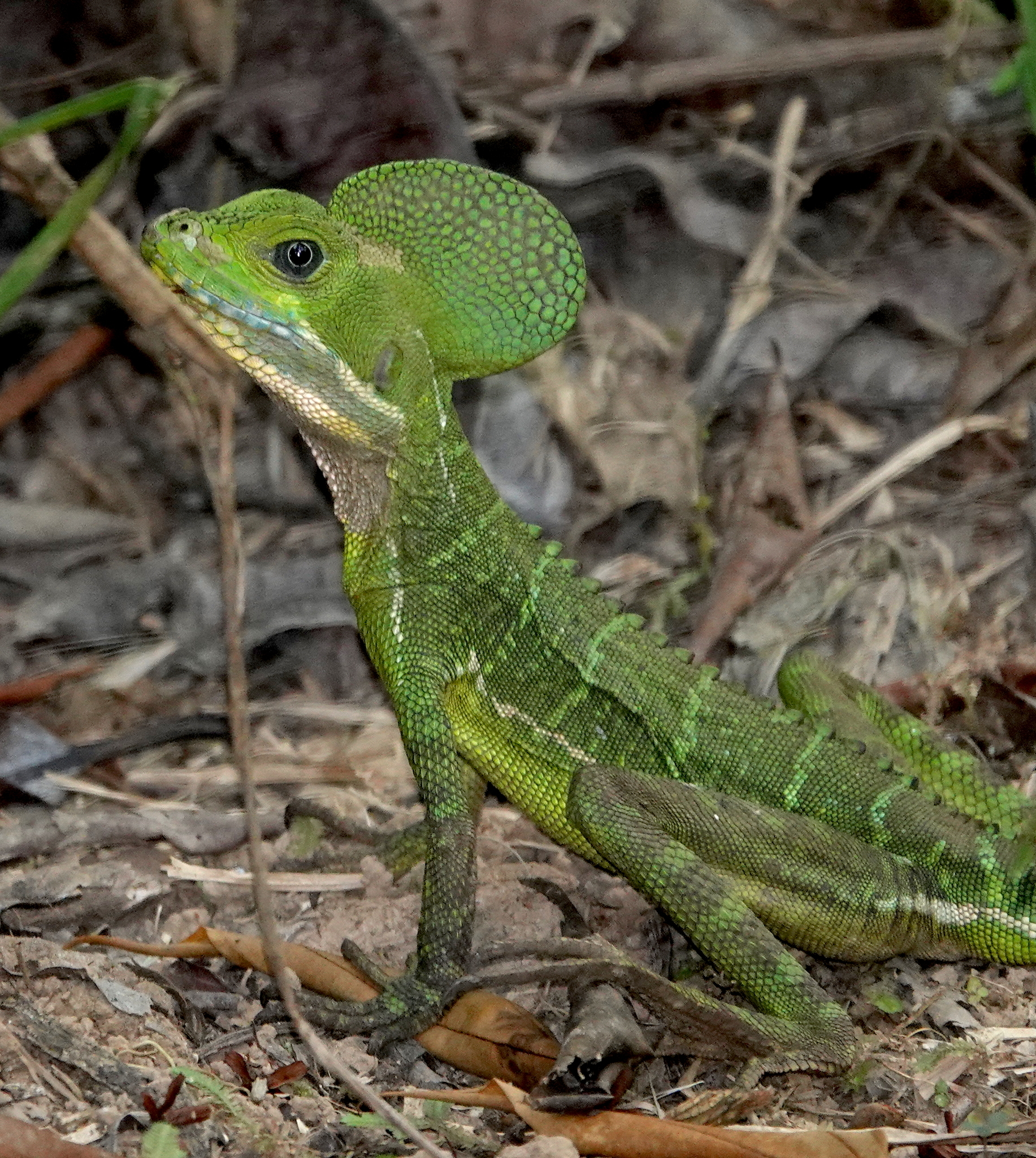
- In Colombia

Conservation status
- Least Concern (IUCN 3.1)

Scientific classification
- Kingdom: Animalia
- Phylum: Chordata
- Class: Reptilia
- Order: Squamata
- Suborder: Iguania
- Family: Corytophanidae
- Genus: Basiliscus
- Species: B. galeritus

Binomial name
- Basiliscus galeritus A.M.C. Duméril & A.H.A. Duméril, 1851

= Western basilisk =

Species of lizard

The western basilisk (Basiliscus galeritus), also known as the red-headed basilisk, is a large species of lizard in the family Corytophanidae. The species is endemic to northwestern South America.

== Etymology ==
The specific name, galeritus, which is Latin, means "wearing a hood", referring to the head crest.

== Habitat and geographic range ==
B. galeritus inhabits forests at altitudes of 0–1,600 m (0–5,249 ft) in western Colombia and western Ecuador in South America. Earlier reports of its occurrence in Central America are mistaken and actually refer to young of the closely related common basilisk.

== Description ==
Males of B. galeritus reach a total length (including tail) up to about 77.5 cm (30.5 in), while females reach about 63.5 cm (25.0 in).

Its body color is olive-green with a reddish-brown underbelly. The throat is white to yellow. On the back it has a small crest similar to that of young individuals of the common basilisk. It may have a narrow white stripe or a row of white dots on each side. It has no back flap. The adult males bear a round head flap/crest.

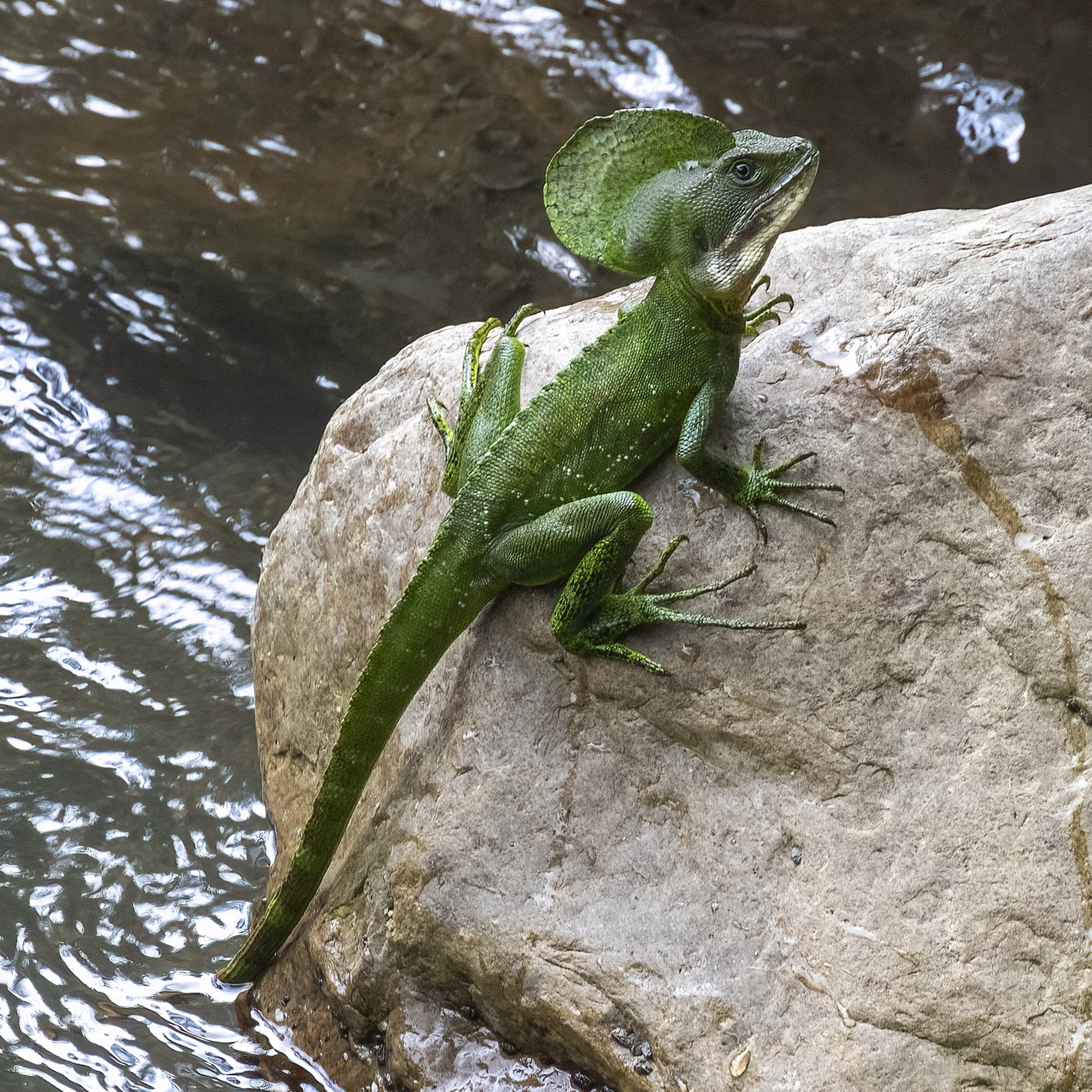
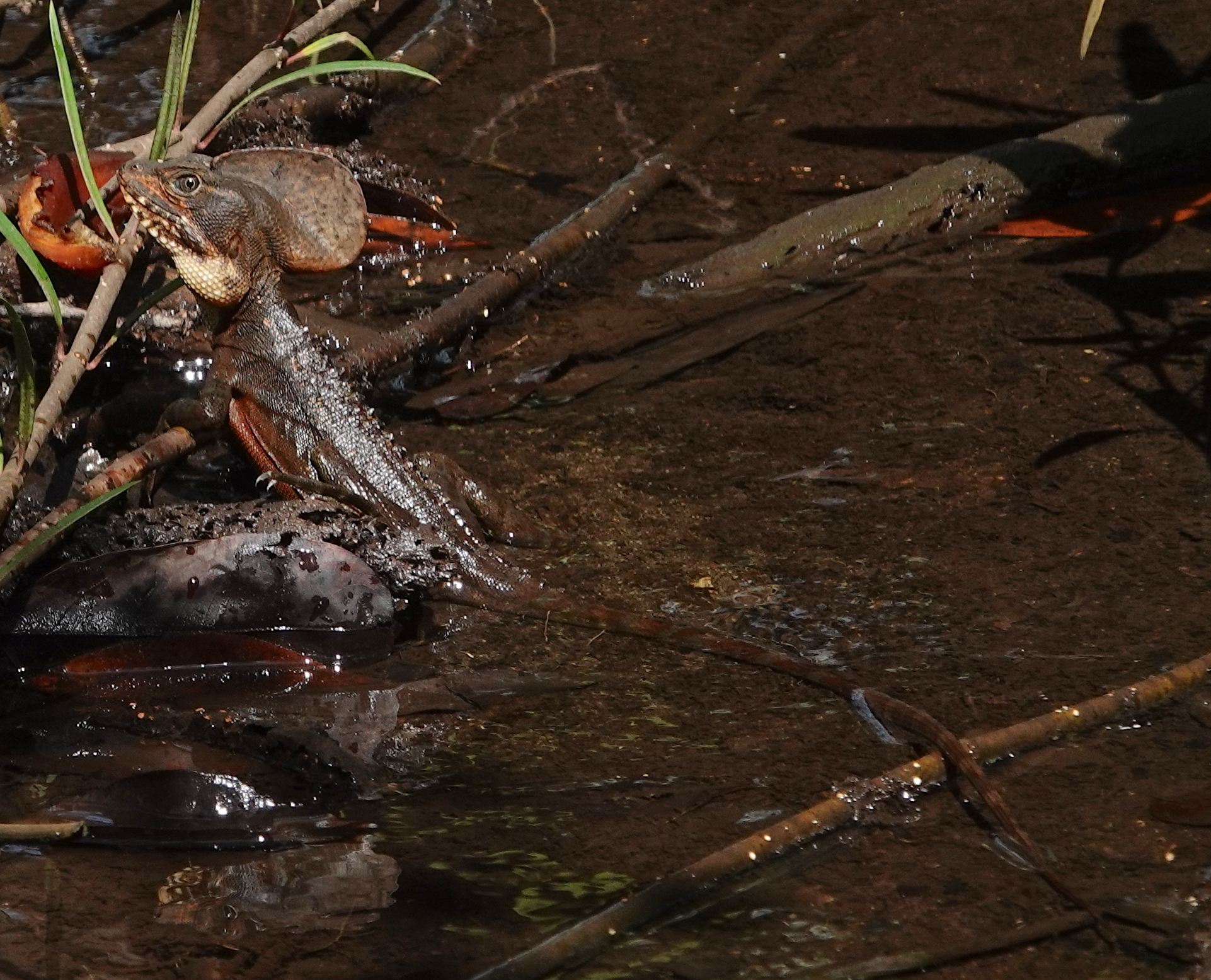
Two different coloured western basilisks, in Colombia

== Invasive species ==
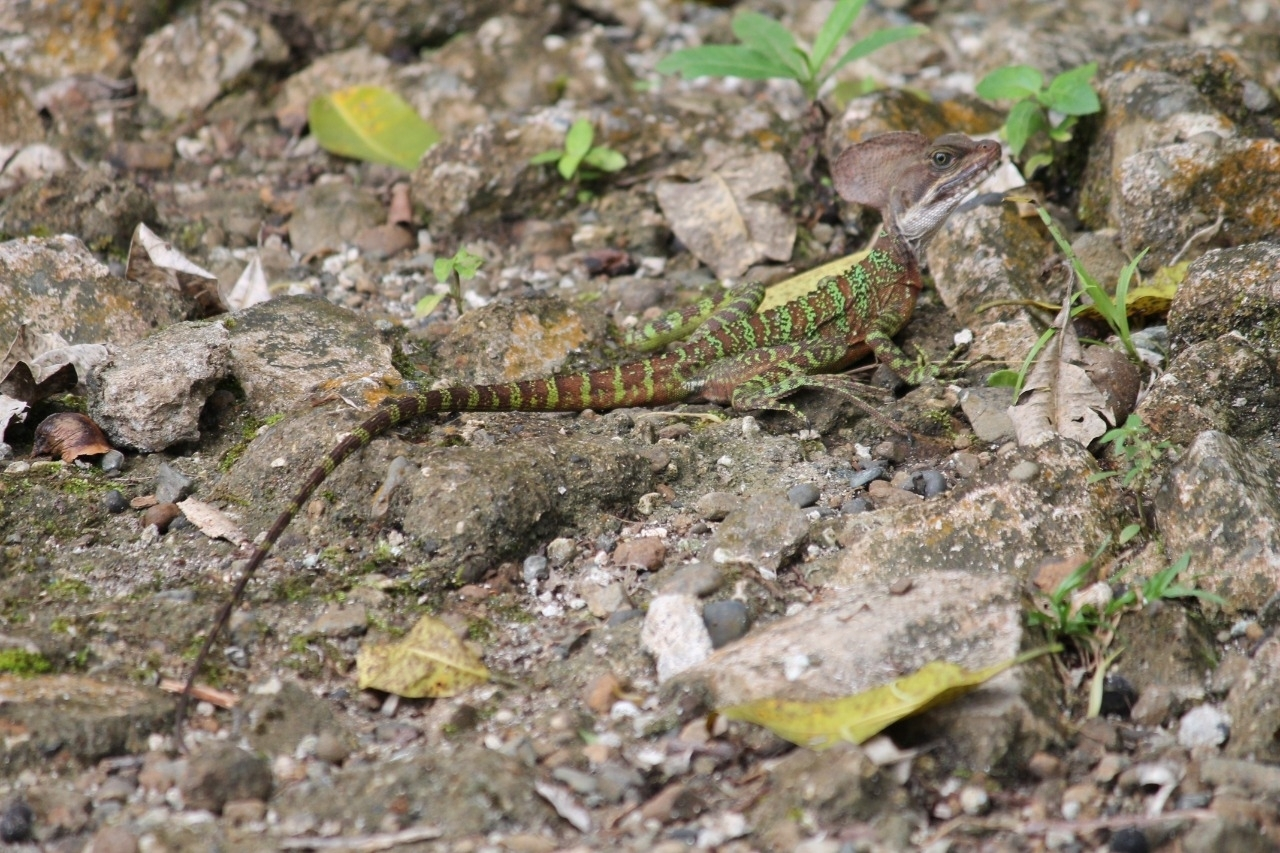
Invasive western basilisk on Gorgona Island

The western basilisk has been introduced to Gorgona Island, Colombia. This species is not native to the island, and thus, is endangering native species that reside on the island, such as the endemic blue anole (Anolis gorgonae).

== Conservation status ==
The western basilisk is common and not threatened.

== Gallery ==
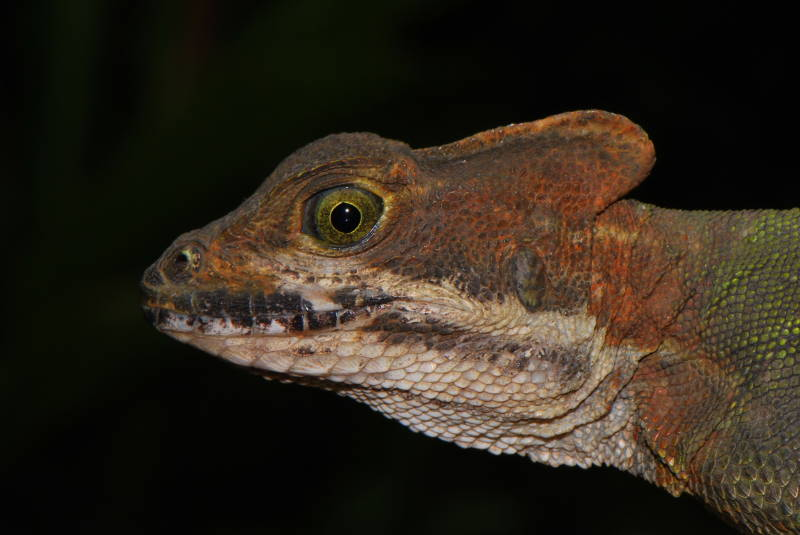
In Ecuador

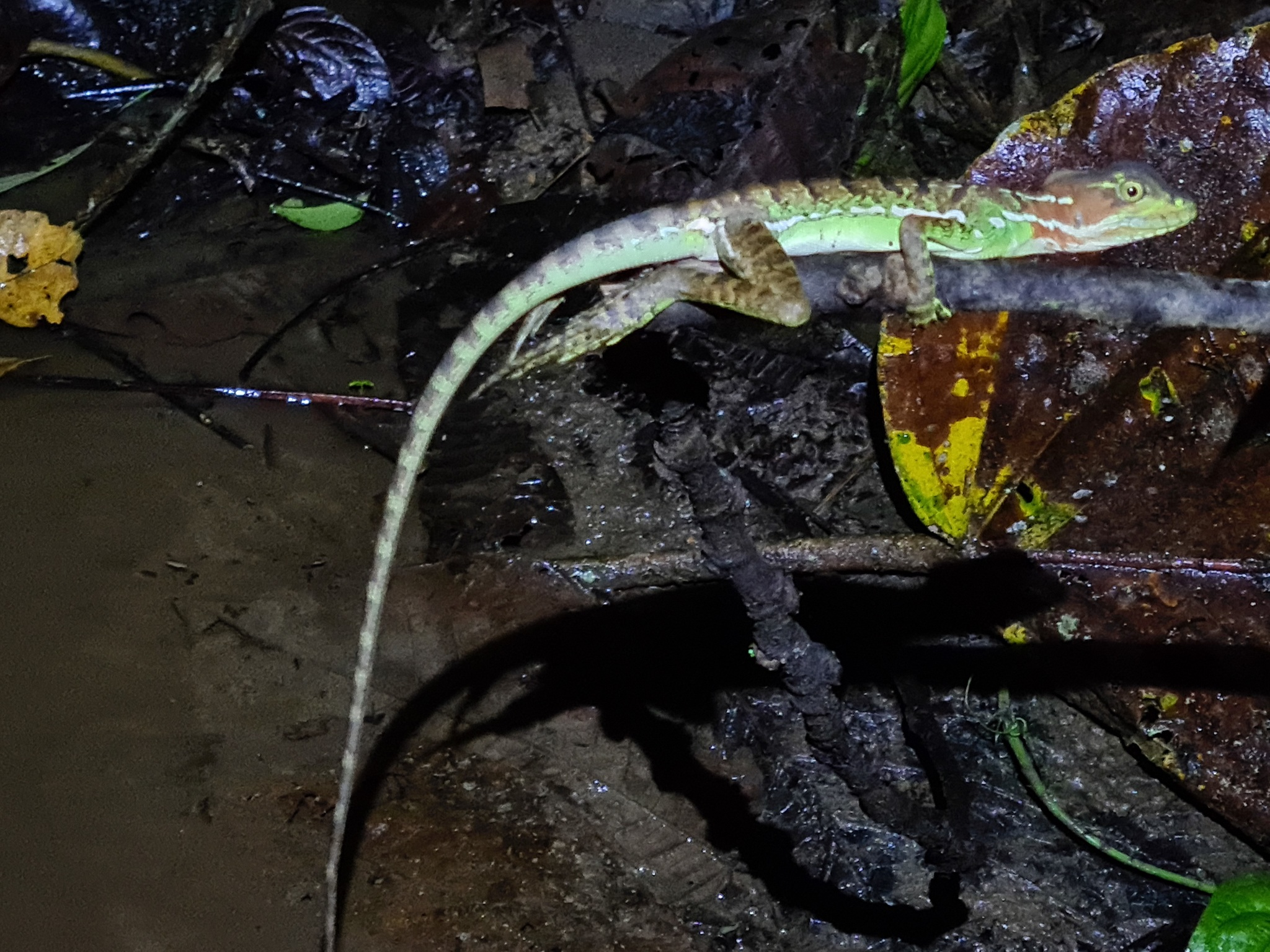
Juvenile, in Ecuador
