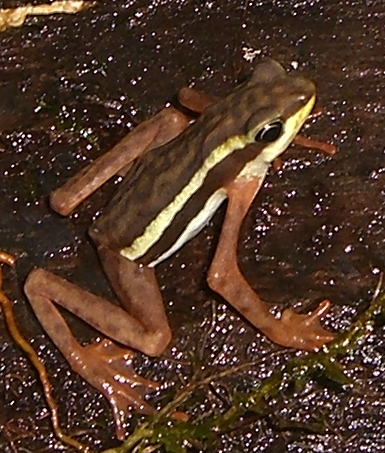
- Atelopus elegans from the Gorgona Island

Conservation status
- Endangered (IUCN 3.1)

Scientific classification
- Kingdom: Animalia
- Phylum: Chordata
- Class: Amphibia
- Order: Anura
- Family: Bufonidae
- Genus: Atelopus
- Species: A. elegans

Binomial name
- Atelopus elegans (Boulenger, 1882)

Synonyms
- Phryniscus elegans Boulenger, 1882; Atelopus gracilis Barbour, 1905

= Elegant stubfoot toad =

Species of amphibian

The elegant stubfoot toad or Pacific jambato frog (Atelopus elegans) is a species of toad in the family Bufonidae found in lowlands and Andean slopes of northwest Ecuador to 1,140 m (3,740 ft) asl and on the Gorgona Island, off southwest coast of Colombia. It was described by George Albert Boulenger in 1882 based on a specimen collected by Edward Whymper. It is known in Spanish as rana jambato del Pacífico or simply jambato del Pacífico.

== History and taxonomy ==
The species was described by George Albert Boulenger in 1882 based on a female specimen collected by Edward Whymper during his expedition to Ecuador in 1879–1880. Toads from the Gorgona Island were described by Thomas Barbour in 1905 as a new species, Atelopus gracilis, but later authors have considered them to be the same species as Atelopus elegans. Analyses using molecular methods have not included Atelopus elegans, and the colour difference between the mainland and Gorgona populations suggests that the validity of Atelopus gracilis remains possible. Atelopus gracilis is sometimes recognized as a subspecies, Atelopus elegans gracilis.

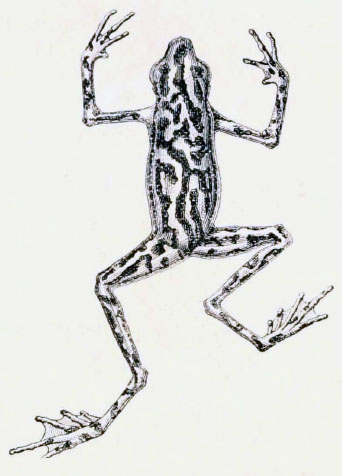
Illustration of the holotype of Atelopus elegans, collected by Edward Whymper during his expedition to Ecuador.

== Description ==
Males measure 21–23 mm (0.83–0.91 in) and females 31–35 mm (1.2–1.4 in) in snout–vent length. It has slender body with long head. Fore and hind limbs are slender with webbed fingers and toes. Tympanum is absent. Skin is smooth. Dorsal colouration is from dark olive green to bright yellow. Well defined black spots or blotches are always present on the back and on the limbs. The belly is yellow. Toads from the Gorgona Island are brown in colouration.

== Habitat and conservation ==
Natural habitats of Atelopus elegans are lowland and submontane humid rainforests. Recent Ecuadorian observations are from patches of secondary forest or from flooded areas and pastures next to secondary forests.

It is very common on the Gorgona Island, but has seriously declined in Ecuador, possibly because of chytridiomycosis. Only one known population remains in Ecuador, in the Esmeraldas Province, and a captive colony has been established for conservation purposes. The species is also threatened by habitat loss.
