= Antombo =

Central African singer of Colombian and Gabonese descent

- Born: Antombo Yoryette Langangui Barahona; August 26, 1984 (age 41); Bangui, Central African Republic
- Genres: R&B; pop; Reggae; Dancehall
- Occupations: Singer, songwriter
- Years active: 2001–present
- Labels: Codiscos; Panta Records

Antombo Yoryette Langangui Barahona (born 26 August 1984 in Bangui) is a Central African singer and songwriter based in Colombia. Of Gabonese and Colombian descent, she has been part of Profetas since 2001.

== Biography ==
Antombo was born to Jean Langangui Alana, a Gabonese diplomat, and Elbadina Barahona Quiñónez, a Colombian chef from Rincón Hondo, Cesar, who met in Venezuela where Langangui was the Gabonese ambassador. Langangui and Barahona had two daughters, Ossengue (born in Venezuela) and Antombo; Langangui adopted Barahona's children born in Colombia, Alba Inés and Omar.

In the late 1980s, Antombo's parents would be diagnosed with HIV; her mother took her four children to Colombia and her father would pass away in Africa. The family first arrived to Rincón Hondo and later would move to Bogotá, where Ossengue and Antombo would be enrolled at the Lycée français and live in Rosales, an exclusive neighbourhood; later they would have to move to Soacha and Antombo was transferred to a public school there. Her mother would pass away and their brother Omar would take care of them, though the Langangui sisters spent some time at an ICBF centre.

Antombo is fluent in French, her mother tongue, Spanish and English.

== Career ==
When she was in high school, Antombo joined a project named Las Panteras Negras. Around 2000, Antombo visited her sister Alba in Puerto Tejada, where she met Pablo Belalcázar, best known as Pablo Fortaleza. A year later they formed Profetas, an Afro-Colombian music duo fusing reggae, hip hop, and Afro-Colombian sounds. With Profetas, Antombo has toured in the United Kingdom, Germany, Austria, Switzerland, Denmark and the United States.

Antombo released her first solo album Natural in 2017.

== Discography ==
=== With Profetas ===
- Amor y fortaleza, 2006
- Baila, 2011
- Tiempo, 2016
- Afrodisíaco, 2020

=== As a solo artist ===
==== Albums ====
- Natural, 2017

==== Singles ====
- La movie, 2022
- La campeona, 2022
- Twerk, 2022
- Bésame, 2023
- Qué calor, 2023
- Location, 2024
