= Guapi River =

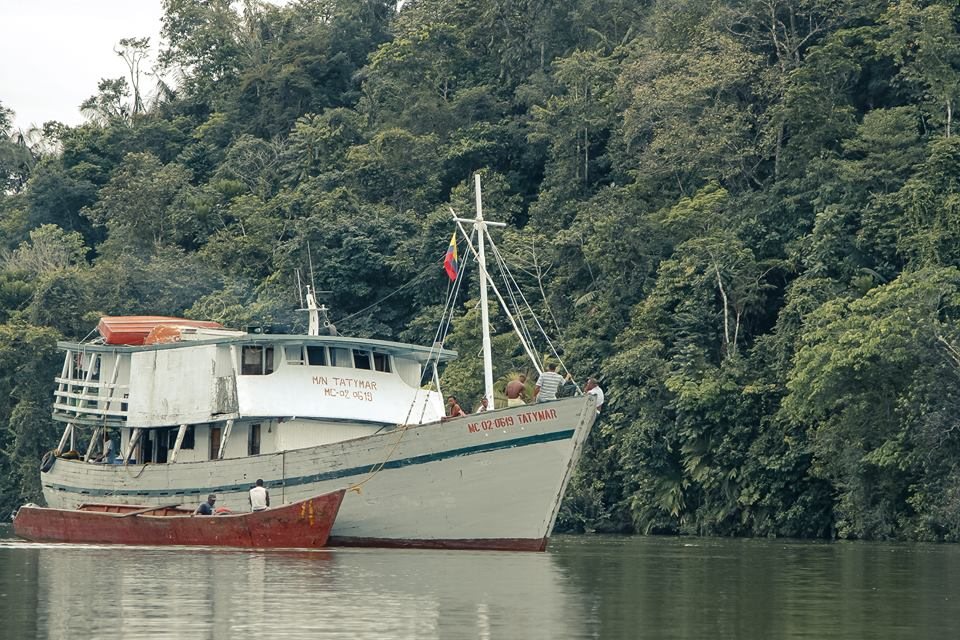
- Boat on the river

- Mouth location in Colombia
- Native name: Río Guapi (Spanish)

Location
- Country: Colombia

Physical characteristics
- Mouth
  - coordinates: 2°38′33″N 77°54′41″W

The Guapi River (Spanish: Río Guapi) is a river of Colombia that flows into the Pacific Ocean near the town of Guapi, Cauca.

The mouth of the river has extensive stands of mangroves, part of the Esmeraldes-Pacific Colombia mangroves ecoregion.

== See also ==
- List of rivers of Colombia

== Sources ==
- Carlos Borda, Northern South America: Northern Colombia, WWF: World Wide Fund for Nature
