= Elena Hinestroza =

Colombian singer, songwriter, and community leader

- Also known as: The Cantadora of Peace
- Born: Elena Hinestroza Venté; Timbiquí, Colombia
- Member of: Integración Pacífica

Elena Hinestroza Venté (Note: In this Spanish name, the first or paternal surname is Hinestroza and the second or maternal family name is Venté.) is a Colombian singer, songwriter, and community leader. In 2008, she was displaced from her home in Timbiquí by the Colombian conflict. She leads the musical group Integración Pacífica, and is known as the "Cantadora of Peace" (Note: In the Colombian Pacific, cantadoras are women who preserve community traditions and practices relating to food, education, healthcare etc. via song.) (Spanish: la Cantadora de la Paz).

== Biography ==
Hinestroza is from Cheté, Timbiquí, in the Colombian department of Cauca. Her maternal grandmother was also a cantadora, and was enslaved and forced to work in a gold mine. Both of Hinestroza's parents died when she was 13. She had her first child aged 15, and moved to live with her sister in Santa María, Timbiquí, when she was 17. In Santa María, Hinestroza met her husband, with whom she has another 8 children.

In Timbiquí, Hinestroza was a community leader. She led a women's organisation called "Defenders of the Environment and Promoters of Pacific Culture" (Spanish: Defensoras del Medio Ambiente y Promotoras de la Cultura del Pacífico). She was also in a musical group called Estrellas del Ze-ze.

In 2008, Hinestroza left Timbiquí after being threatened by armed groups and moved to Cali, to the district of Aguablanca. In Cali she was invited to join a rehearsal of the musical group Socavón de Timbiquí, about which she said: "from then on, my world became clear and I took part of my soul – the music of the Pacific – as a path to heal myself, free myself and help others who, like me, had been displaced". Hinestroza formed her own musical group Integración Pacífica, with members from across the Pacific region of Colombia including Ana Judith Gamboa, Zoranlli Cuero Hinestroza, María Elvira Solís, and Alicia Arrechea. While living in Cali, Hinestroza also studied at the women's political school of the Casa Cultura el Chontaduro.

Hinestroza won the Estímulos prize of the Colombian Ministry of Culture in 2016, and used the prize money to record 10 tracks with Integración Pacífica. In 2021, Hinestroza and Integración Pacífica performed at the Petronio Álvarez Festival and the Cali Fair.

== Musical style and compositions ==
Hinestroza has written over 50 songs in various styles including fuga, currulao, bambuco, bunde chocoano, cununo, and guazá.
