= Timbiquí =

Coordinates: 2°46′19″N 77°39′54″W

Timbiquí, Cauca
- Municipality and town
- Flag Coat of arms

- Location of the municipality and town of Timbiquí, Cauca in the Cauca Department of Colombia.
- Country: Colombia
- Department: Cauca Department

Population (Census 2018)
  - Total: 21,618
- Time zone: UTC-5 (Colombia Standard Time)
- Climate: Af

Timbiquí is a town and municipality in the Cauca Department, Colombia. It is located on the Pacific Coast of Colombia on the estuary of the Timbiquí River. An earthquake affected its inhabitants on the first of October, 2012.

== History ==
The town of Timbiquí was founded in 1772 by Francisco Mosquera and Andrés Saa, mine owners who released the land for the construction of the town, whose first name was Santa Bárbara. Timbiquí was promoted to the category of municipality in 1915, when the Republic began a slow process of institutionalization of the Pacific coast towns, after a conflict with the transnational company The New Timbiquí Gold Mines, Ltd., which claimed ownership over the entire population, in addition to the ownership exercised over the gold mines.

=== Conquest, Colonization and Republic ===
The first inhabitants of the territory of Timbiquí were indigenous people of the Embera nation who inhabited the river banks of the Colombian Pacific coast on the West side of the Cordillera Occidental, a region also known as biogeographic Chocó. Pascual de Andagoya, who in 1540, explored the area south of Bahía La Cruz - today Buenaventura - was the first European to report a "dense indigenous population" with large houses supported by stilts - called Barbacoas (Spanish for BBQ) by the Spanish -, especially in the vicinity of the Patía River Delta. According to chroniclers and the first conquerors, these stilt dwellings were so abundant that the name "Province of Las Barbacoas" was soon given to an entire region from the banks of the Saija and Timbiquí rivers to the Mira river in the south. Other explorations of the region during the XVI century, were made from the town of Popayán;

The chronicles written between the years of 1541 and 1545, record two indigenous groups, one called Tama, Tamayo or Tamay, also reviewed by Ramírez de la Serna in 1610, and another called Petres, located on the banks of the Timbiquí and Guapi rivers. The first, there seems to be no doubt, was located on the banks of the Timbiquí River, since it is mentioned that only canoes traveled through the narrow and fast-flowing river, and not in brigantines as was done on the Petres River - river Guapi-; The first reference to Tamay was recorded by Fernández de Oviedo when he recounts the incursion of Cristóbal de Peña into the territory of this town. They became known as warriors, who had even repelled previous Spanish forces. Regarding the name of Timbiquí, it apparently corresponds to the old Tamay River; however its origin is not clear. Although it is an indigenous voice, there has never been talk of Timbiquí people.

In 1634, when the Spanish discovered the rich gold deposits in the region, they named Timbiquí both the river and its basin and the entire district, which extended to the Cove of Tumaco, to the south. The Petres were located in the middle and lower parts of the Guapi River - formerly called "Santa María River" and baptized by Andagoya River "Agora" (1541) -; Apparently they did not occupy the lands surrounding the sea in the mangrove area, nor did other coastal towns. The Petres moved up the Guapi River until they reached commercial contacts, "merchandise", with the towns of the province of Chisquío, a town located a short distance from Popayán, in the western mountain.

In 1634, during the time of the Viceroyalty of New Granada rich gold deposits were discovered in the region, the province was renamed 'Timbiquí' after the river. The indigenous populations of the area were forced to work on the extraction of the gold from the rivers until the end of the XVII century, when they become almost extinct and were replaced by African slave labor. Black migration into the region increased after emancipation in 1851, causing distrust among indigenas who left their traditional lands. However, inter-ethnic solidarity gradually developed between africans and indigenous forming maroon societies in the XVIII and XIX centuries to escape forced labor. Indigenous and blacks survived the adverse rainforest environment by combining their strategies of subsistence which included slash-mulch cultivation, silviculture, hunting, gold and timber extraction, harvesting mangroves, and fishing.

In 1902, the New Timbiquí Gold Mines Ltd., a British company with French capital that was given concession to extract gold from the region. In the 1920s, taking advantage of government malfeasance, overlapping legislations, and violent territorial control Interest in the region’s the New Timbiquí Gold Mines acquired property rights over large tracts of government-defined fallow land, landlocking the communities and forcing them to obtain special permissions to live on ancestral lands, forbidding traditional mining methods.

== Geography ==
This municipality has an area of 1,813 km2, with an altitude of five meters above sea level. Located at a distance of 580 kilometers from Popayán, to the west of the Cauca department, it limits to the north with López de Micay, to the east with El Tambo, Cauca and Argelia, Cauca, to the south with Guapi and to the west with the Pacific Ocean. The topography of the municipality is 70% varied, with mountainous branches and plains. Its temperature is approximately 28 °C.

The region is characterized by having an extensive river network; important rivers descend from the Western Cordillera and the Napi and Timbiquí hills - among them the rivers that give their name to the municipalities of Guapi and Timbiquí, Saija, Bubuey, Guafuí, Limones and Napi - whose waters flow into the Pacific Ocean through of a series of estuaries and arms in the mangrove region. In the region of the mouth of the rivers and out to sea, fishing for small and medium-sized prey is abundant, exploited in an artisanal way by the residents of the region. The region is classified according to its plant formations as Very Humid Tropical Forest (vhtf) with mangrove vegetation predominating in the brackish swamp area; The average annual rainfall varies between 4,000 and 8,000 mm. and average temperatures of 29 C. The eastern part of the region has an undulating and mountainous topography due to the rise of the Western Cordillera, whose heights reach 3,000 meters above sea level.

== Demographics ==
According to the statistical projections of the 2018 Census, in 2020 the municipality has a total population of 26,607 inhabitants, of which 50.5% are men and 49.5% are women. In relation to the population composition, of the total population, 9.23% defined themselves as indigenous, 76.8% as black, mulatto or Afro-Colombian, and the remaining 11% as mestizo. The population pyramid accounts for a significant contingent of the population under 25 years of age, which represents 55.6% of the total population. This situation presents a challenge for the municipal authority, since the vast majority of social investment resources will be focused on meeting the social demands of the young population, adolescents, children and early childhood, evidencing the need for attention. comprehensive on the institutionality.

== Administrative Division ==
The municipality of Timbiquí has the following towns or corregimientos under its administration:

- Angostura
- Boca de Patía
- Bubuey
- Cabecital
- Camarones
- Chete
- Corozal
- Coteje
- Cupi
- El Charco
- El Realito
- Guangui
- Los Brasos
- Pizare
- Puerto Saija
- San Bernardo
- San José
- San Miguel
- Santa María
- Santa Rosa de Saija

== Economy ==
Historically, the municipality's economy has been related to mining activities. Even since the arrival of the Spanish, this area of the Pacific was selected as a priority for the exploitation of gold and silver. Hand in hand with the above, the economy has been nourished by the exchange of basic agricultural products (rice, corn, coconut, cane, banana, plantain), as well as artisanal fishing activities. It is noted in the municipal characterization carried out by the Mayor's Office of Timbiquí, that cane and coconut are the products that allow commercial exchange with other municipalities and that leave some surpluses for the population.

== Climate ==
Like all the Pacific coast of Colombia, Timbiquí has a very wet tropical rainforest climate (Köppen Af).

Climate data for Timbiquí
Month	Jan	Feb	Mar	Apr	May	Jun	Jul	Aug	Sep	Oct	Nov	Dec	Year
Mean daily maximum °C (°F)	29.1 (84.4)	29.9 (85.8)	30.2 (86.4)	29.9 (85.8)	29.8 (85.6)	29.7 (85.5)	29.7 (85.5)	29.6 (85.3)	29.2 (84.6)	28.4 (83.1)	28.6 (83.5)	29.0 (84.2)	29.4 (85.0)
Daily mean °C (°F)	26.2 (79.2)	26.5 (79.7)	26.8 (80.2)	26.7 (80.1)	26.8 (80.2)	26.4 (79.5)	26.3 (79.3)	26.3 (79.3)	26.2 (79.2)	26.0 (78.8)	26.0 (78.8)	26.1 (79.0)	26.4 (79.4)
Mean daily minimum °C (°F)	23.3 (73.9)	23.2 (73.8)	23.4 (74.1)	23.6 (74.5)	23.8 (74.8)	23.1 (73.6)	23.0 (73.4)	23.1 (73.6)	23.3 (73.9)	23.7 (74.7)	23.5 (74.3)	23.2 (73.8)	23.3 (74.0)
Average rainfall mm (inches)	501.0 (19.72)	403.1 (15.87)	405.7 (15.97)	552.4 (21.75)	763.9 (30.07)	639.4 (25.17)	519.6 (20.46)	526.9 (20.74)	635.6 (25.02)	750.6 (29.55)	620.5 (24.43)	546.8 (21.53)	6,865.5 (270.28)
Average rainy days	19	15	16	20	23	22	21	20	22	23	20	20	241

== Notable people ==
- Nidia Góngora, singer and songwriter
- Elena Hinestroza, singer, songwriter, and community leader
