= Ulises Hadjis =

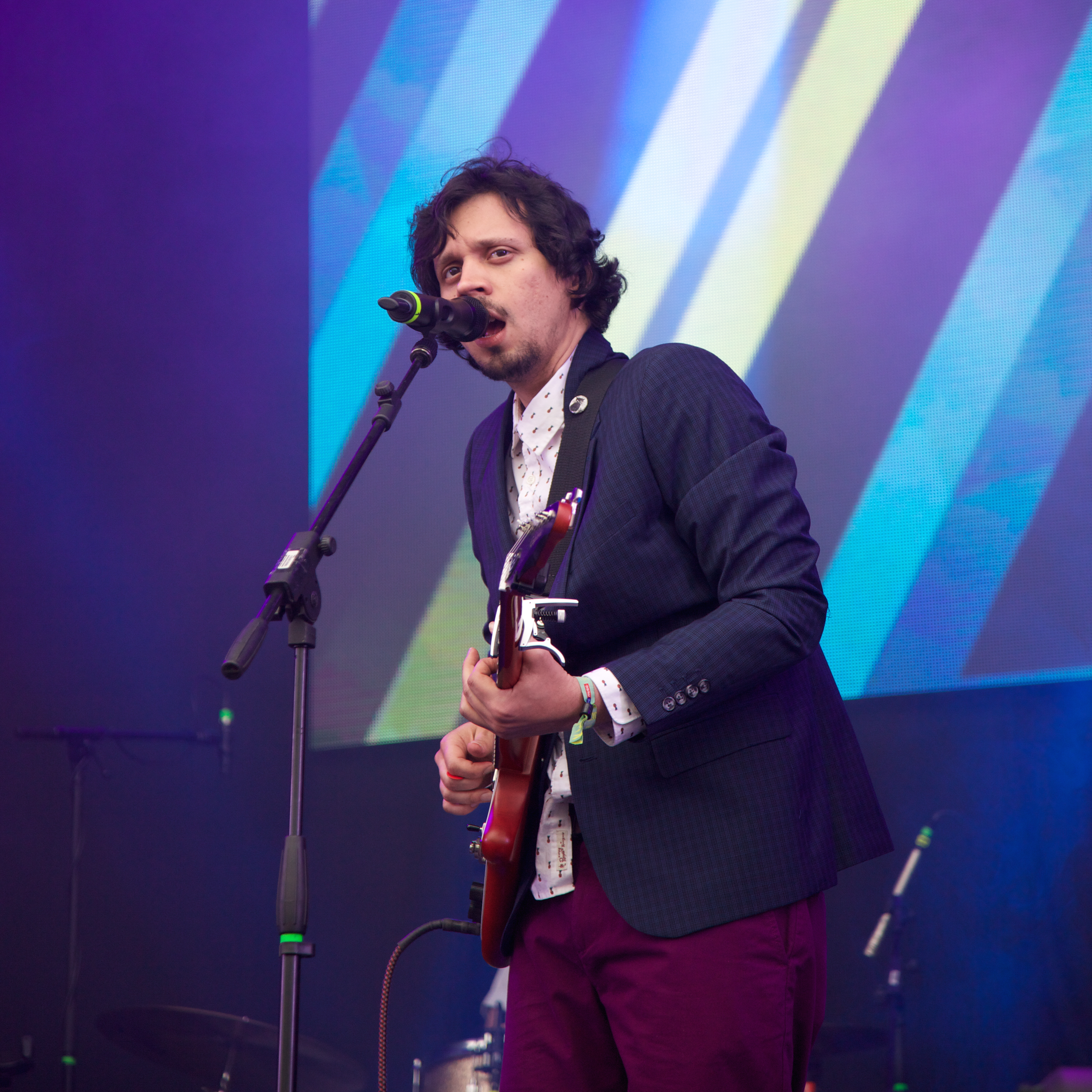

Background information
- Origin: Maracaibo, Zulia, Venezuela
- Genres: Pop, Latin rock
- Instrument(s): Vocals, guitar, drums, harmonica
- Years active: 2008–present
- Labels: SHOCK Music

Ulises Hadjis is a Venezuelan singer-songwriter and multi-instrumentalist nominated to the Latin Grammy Awards of 2012 in the Best New Artist, Best Alternative Album and Best Rock Song categories. Apart from being a musician, he graduated from sociology and most recently received a master's degree in Philosophy which are contributive factors in all of his songs. Hadjis believes that "the subconscious plays a very important role in all artists' creation process". His most recent album, Pavimento, released on May 26, 2015, was produced by the Grammy-winning Andres Levin

== Biography ==
Ulises Hadjis was born in Maracaibo, Venezuela. During his childhood, he learned to play the drums and guitar. When he was 17 years old, he was one of the founding members of a ska band called Julia, with which he recorded his first LP.

In 2008, Hadjis released his first solo full-length album, titled Presente, praised by many critics, including Rolling Stone Latin America, giving his debut album a 4-star rating.

Hadjis followed his debut album with a second full-length LP titled Cosas Perdidas, released in 2012. The album received three nominations at the Latin Grammy Awards of 2012. With this recognition under his belt, he was invited to various influential festivals in Latin America and Spain.

After three years of touring and moving permanently from Venezuela to Mexico, Hadjis released his third album Pavimento in 2015, produced by Grammy Award-winning producer Andres Levin. The album was promoted with a tour with multiple dates across United States, Colombia and Ecuador. The album's first single, "Consecuencias y Reclamos" was named as one of the best songs of 2015 by NPR.

== Discography ==
=== Studio albums ===
- 2015: Pavimento
- 2012: Cosas Perdidas
- 2008: Presente

=== Singles ===
- 2015: "En Algún Momento"
- 2015: "Consecuencias y Reclamos"
- 2014: "Si No Te Vas Mañana (Llévatelo Todo)" (feat. Samantha Dagnino)
- 2014: "Lo Haré" (feat. Denise Gutiérrez of Hello Seahorse!)
- 2013: "Diciembre"
- 2013: "Aquella Ciudad" (feat. Juan Manuel Torreblanca of Torreblanca)
- 2012: "Dónde Va"
- 2009: "Sin Caer"
- 2009: "Lunes"

=== Collaborations ===
- 2012: "Aquella Ciudad" (feat. Juan Manuel Torreblanca of Torreblanca)
- 2012: "Lo Haré" (feat. Denise Gutiérrez of Hello Seahorse!)
- 2014: "Si No Te Vas Mañana (Llévatelo Todo)" (feat. Samantha Dagnino)
- 2015: "Movimiento" (feat. Gepe)
- 2015: "Consecuencias y Reclamos" (feat. Esteman and Juan Pablo Vega)

== Awards and nominations ==
=== Latin Grammy Awards ===
Year	Nominee / work	Award	Result
2012	Ulises Hadjis	Best New Artist	Nominated
2012	Cosas Perdidas	Best Alternative Album	Nominated
2012	"Dónde Va"	Best Rock Song	Nominated

=== Pepsi Music Awards ===
Year	Nominee / work	Award	Result
2013	Cosas Perdidas	Album of the Year	Nominated
2013	Ulises Hadjis	Best Singer-Songwriter	Nominated
2013	Ulises Hadjis	Best Pop Artist	Nominated
2015	"Si No Te Vas Mañana (Llévatelo Todo)"	Best Original Song for a Movie	Nominated
