= Christmas in Colombia =

Traditional decorations displayed on this holiday include nativity scenes, poinsettias, Christmas trees, and candles.

On January 1, the arrival of Christmas is celebrated with the popular dawn, the latter is the most extensive fireworks detonation event in the country that lasts all midnight until sunset on January 1.

== Christmas season in Colombia ==
Christmas traditions incorporate remains of Basque heritage practices, this being even more marked in Antioquia and its surrounding departments.

The activities of the market begin at the end of November, with the sale of trees, clothes, garlands, Christmas flowers, lights and pyrotechnics, as well as the popular mixture for custard, a typical Colombian Christmas dish, Good night is celebrated with the popular chocolate parties, the latter are events held in residential areas as a form of coexistence between neighbors where traditional foods of the time are shared such as fritters, custard, chocolate and bonus bread, the front parts of the houses are usually decorated with lights, and typical flowers and the lower part of the trees are usually decorated with mangers simulating the birth of Jesus Christ.

== Day of the Little Candles ==
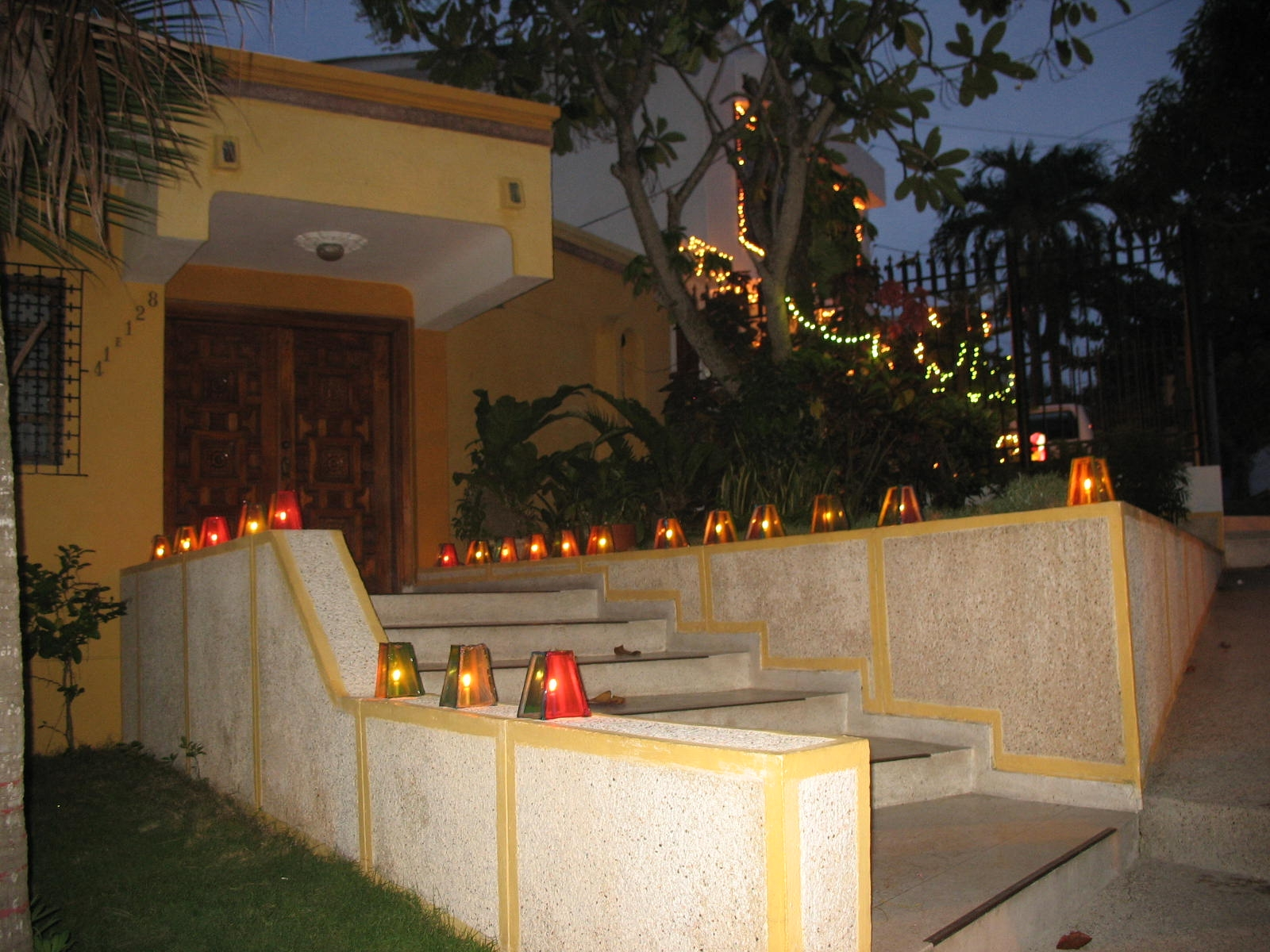
House in Barranquilla decorated with lanterns during the early hours of December 8

Among the festivities is the traditional day of the candles, between December 7 and 8. This day is the unofficial start of the Christmas season in the country, although the official day is the first Sunday of Advent (between November 27 and December 3).

On this night, people place candles and paper lanterns on windowsills, balconies, porches, sidewalks, streets, parks, and squares; In short, they can be seen everywhere, in honor of the Virgin Mary and her Immaculate Conception. On December 8, it is customary for houses to hoist a white flag with the image of the Virgin Mary throughout the day. They also organize numerous events, from fireworks shows to contests.

== Novena of Aguinaldos ==
Novena of aguinaldos, also known as the novena to Baby Jesus, is a novena (nine-day religious ceremony) held during the time leading up to Christmas from December 16 to December 24.

During each night of the novena, families and friends pray, eat, and sing villancicos together, often accompanied by musical instruments.

After the novena, traditional Christmas dishes are served such as buñuelos, natilla, empanadas, hot chocolate, and sabajón, which is a Colombian-style spiked eggnog.

== See also ==
- Culture of Colombia
- Religion in Colombia
- Public holidays in Colombia
