= Guapi, Cauca =

- Municipality and town
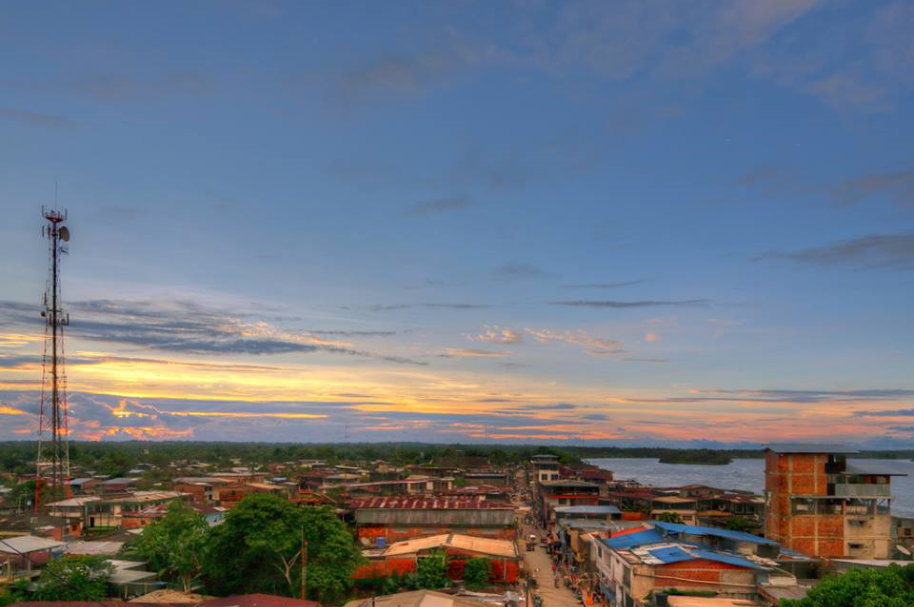
- Panoramic

- Flag Coat of arms

- Location of the municipality and town of Guapi, Cauca in the Cauca Department of Colombia.
- Coordinates: 02°34′13″N 77°53′08″W
- Country: Colombia
- Department: Cauca Department

Population (Census 2018)
  - Total: 24,037
- Time zone: UTC-5 (Colombia Standard Time)
- Climate: Af

Guapi is a town and municipality in the Cauca Department, Colombia. The municipality of Guapi is located on the Guapi River, 4 miles (6.4 km) from the Pacific Ocean, and also covers the island of Gorgona.

== Culture ==
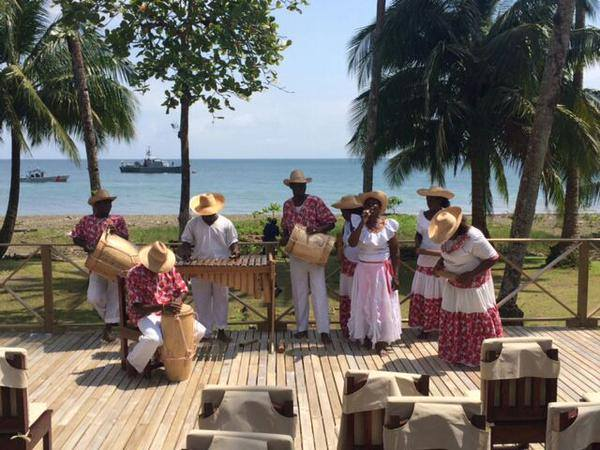
Traditional music being performed in Guapi

Guapi is a predominantly Afro-Colombian and Catholic area, with a rich local history. Combining both aspects, and most prominent in local tradition, Guapireños have been building balsadas – handcrafted two-tiered boats decorated with native materials – every December, as part of two ceremonies related to Christmas, for many generations. A Guapireño described the tradition as "a cultural manifestation that has been preserved for centuries and that is linked with the black community's history of resistance".

The balsadas traditionally honor the Virgin Mary, the town's patron saint, and are floated down the Guapi River on the nights of both 7 December (Day of the Little Candles) and Christmas Eve. Over three days at the start of December, families in the community build the balsadas, which consist of large canoes, then wooden rafts with two levels constructed on top of the canoes. Local yellow corozo leaves are used for the roof and for decoration, carefully looped into patterns. Other decorations are less natural, including balloons and lights; these are used to make the rafts appear blue and white, the colors of the town's flag. The principal decoration is an image of the Virgin Mary. Afro-Pacific music is performed on the balsadas when they are floated, and occupants often dance; the festivities have expanded to include pyrotechnics as the balsadas approach the town square. Thousands of coconuts set alight meet the balsadas in the river at the square, where the image of the Virgin Mary is carried from the balsadas to the church ahead of the next day's Mass of the Feast of the Immaculate Conception.

Residents identify strongly with the balsadas, which unites them both as a community activity and as a unique traditional activity pertaining to Guapi. In the 21st century, a large tourist balsada was added to the procession, with visitors able to pay to ride on it. This, and the protected heritage status of the balsadas, have been points of contention among the resident population. Some feel that being named cultural heritage and the resulting extra funding would help to protect the tradition, while others worry that the increased awareness will further commercialise it. The associated music was inscribed as UNESCO Intangible Cultural Heritage in 2015, with the balsadas highlighted in the listing.

== Religion ==
Guapi is largely Catholic. The Apostolic Vicariate of Guapi is located in Guapi. Cardinal Fernando Filoni has visited at the Vicariate, where in 2016 he called on Colombians to embrace peace among the community and the wider country. At the time, the church (as organised religion) in the town was identified as in development, seeking clergy, with the visit also forming an appeal to local people to become more materially involved with the church.

== Climate ==
Like all of the Pacific Coast of Colombia, Guapi has a hot, oppressively humid, cloudy and very wet tropical rainforest climate (Köppen Af). Though it is primarily served by the Guapi River, the Nape River and San Francisco River also run through the area. In November 2015, the Nape and San Francisco rivers significantly flooded Guapi, affecting 1,662 families. People were evacuated to Chuare, three hours upstream, despite this town having suffered a landslide due to the floods.

Climate data for Guapi (Guapi Airport), elevation 10 m (33 ft), (1981–2010)
Month	Jan	Feb	Mar	Apr	May	Jun	Jul	Aug	Sep	Oct	Nov	Dec	Year
Mean daily maximum °C (°F)	29.9 (85.8)	30.2 (86.4)	30.8 (87.4)	30.8 (87.4)	30.3 (86.5)	29.8 (85.6)	29.7 (85.5)	29.8 (85.6)	29.7 (85.5)	29.7 (85.5)	29.4 (84.9)	29.5 (85.1)	30.0 (86.0)
Daily mean °C (°F)	25.9 (78.6)	26.2 (79.2)	26.4 (79.5)	26.5 (79.7)	26.4 (79.5)	25.9 (78.6)	25.9 (78.6)	26.0 (78.8)	25.8 (78.4)	25.8 (78.4)	25.6 (78.1)	25.6 (78.1)	26.0 (78.8)
Mean daily minimum °C (°F)	22.1 (71.8)	22.5 (72.5)	22.6 (72.7)	22.8 (73.0)	22.7 (72.9)	22.2 (72.0)	22.1 (71.8)	21.4 (70.5)	21.7 (71.1)	22.1 (71.8)	22.7 (72.9)	22.6 (72.7)	22.2 (72.0)
Average precipitation mm (inches)	366.4 (14.43)	343.4 (13.52)	311.3 (12.26)	420.2 (16.54)	541.1 (21.30)	493.1 (19.41)	418.6 (16.48)	395.8 (15.58)	363.1 (14.30)	378.9 (14.92)	340.2 (13.39)	355.8 (14.01)	4,653.6 (183.21)
Average precipitation days	19	17	18	20	21	23	21	20	21	21	20	22	235
Average relative humidity (%)	89	88	88	88	89	89	89	88	89	88	89	90	89
Mean monthly sunshine hours	86.8	90.3	108.5	117.0	89.9	72.0	86.8	96.1	78.0	80.6	66.0	74.4	1,046.4
Mean daily sunshine hours	2.8	3.2	3.5	3.9	2.9	2.4	2.8	3.1	2.6	2.6	2.2	2.4	2.9
Source: Instituto de Hidrologia Meteorologia y Estudios Ambientales

Climate data for Guapi (Bonanza), elevation 10 m (33 ft), (1981–2010)
Month	Jan	Feb	Mar	Apr	May	Jun	Jul	Aug	Sep	Oct	Nov	Dec	Year
Mean daily maximum °C (°F)	29.6 (85.3)	30.0 (86.0)	30.4 (86.7)	30.4 (86.7)	29.9 (85.8)	29.6 (85.3)	29.7 (85.5)	29.8 (85.6)	29.4 (84.9)	29.4 (84.9)	29.4 (84.9)	29.4 (84.9)	29.8 (85.6)
Daily mean °C (°F)	25.7 (78.3)	26.0 (78.8)	26.2 (79.2)	26.3 (79.3)	26.1 (79.0)	26.0 (78.8)	26.0 (78.8)	26.1 (79.0)	25.8 (78.4)	25.8 (78.4)	25.7 (78.3)	25.7 (78.3)	26.0 (78.8)
Mean daily minimum °C (°F)	22.3 (72.1)	22.4 (72.3)	22.7 (72.9)	23.0 (73.4)	23.1 (73.6)	23.0 (73.4)	22.8 (73.0)	22.8 (73.0)	22.7 (72.9)	22.8 (73.0)	22.8 (73.0)	22.7 (72.9)	22.8 (73.0)
Average precipitation mm (inches)	400.8 (15.78)	324.6 (12.78)	322.8 (12.71)	436.3 (17.18)	613.9 (24.17)	505.2 (19.89)	400.9 (15.78)	350.4 (13.80)	431.3 (16.98)	422.1 (16.62)	345.6 (13.61)	377.6 (14.87)	4,917.9 (193.62)
Average precipitation days	22	19	19	22	24	24	23	21	23	24	21	23	262
Average relative humidity (%)	94	93	93	92	93	93	94	93	93	93	93	94	93
Mean monthly sunshine hours	77.5	79.0	99.2	96.0	89.9	78.0	89.9	89.9	69.0	71.3	69.0	80.6	989.3
Mean daily sunshine hours	2.5	2.8	3.2	3.2	2.9	2.6	2.9	2.9	2.3	2.3	2.3	2.6	2.7
Source: Instituto de Hidrologia Meteorologia y Estudios Ambientales

Climate data for Guapi (Gorgona), elevation 10 m (33 ft), (1981–2010)
Month	Jan	Feb	Mar	Apr	May	Jun	Jul	Aug	Sep	Oct	Nov	Dec	Year
Mean daily maximum °C (°F)	29.1 (84.4)	29.5 (85.1)	29.6 (85.3)	29.8 (85.6)	29.5 (85.1)	29.0 (84.2)	29.0 (84.2)	29.1 (84.4)	28.9 (84.0)	28.8 (83.8)	28.5 (83.3)	28.5 (83.3)	29.1 (84.4)
Daily mean °C (°F)	26.0 (78.8)	26.3 (79.3)	26.3 (79.3)	26.6 (79.9)	26.5 (79.7)	26.1 (79.0)	26.1 (79.0)	26.1 (79.0)	25.9 (78.6)	25.8 (78.4)	25.8 (78.4)	25.8 (78.4)	26.1 (79.0)
Mean daily minimum °C (°F)	23.5 (74.3)	23.4 (74.1)	23.2 (73.8)	23.5 (74.3)	23.7 (74.7)	23.3 (73.9)	23.4 (74.1)	23.3 (73.9)	23.4 (74.1)	23.5 (74.3)	23.6 (74.5)	23.5 (74.3)	23.4 (74.1)
Average precipitation mm (inches)	532.2 (20.95)	316.7 (12.47)	231.7 (9.12)	427.4 (16.83)	779.5 (30.69)	852.9 (33.58)	732.9 (28.85)	613.0 (24.13)	685.4 (26.98)	720.9 (28.38)	569.0 (22.40)	504.9 (19.88)	6,788.7 (267.27)
Average precipitation days	24	18	17	22	26	27	26	24	26	25	23	23	272
Average relative humidity (%)	90	89	89	89	90	91	89	89	91	90	90	90	90
Mean monthly sunshine hours	89.9	107.3	130.2	114.0	86.8	63.0	83.7	80.6	60.0	74.4	69.0	74.4	1,033.3
Mean daily sunshine hours	2.9	3.8	4.2	3.8	2.8	2.1	2.7	2.6	2.0	2.4	2.3	2.4	2.8
Source: Instituto de Hidrologia Meteorologia y Estudios Ambientales

== Transportation ==
The city is served by Guapi Airport.

== Notable people ==
- Hernán Alvarado Solano, bishop
- Mary Grueso, writer
- Lucrecia Panchano, poet
- Jorge Perlaza, footballer
- Semblanzas del Río Guapi, currulao band
