= Tribu Baharú =

- Origin: Bogotá, Colombia
- Genres: Champeta criolla; World music
- Years active: 2009–present
- Label: Discos Fiera
- Members: Boricua; Chindo; Moniqui; Shaka; Juan Sebastian Bastos; Makambille; Pocho

Tribu Baharú is a champeta criolla and world music band from Bogotá, Colombia. The band has been an important force in the revival and international visibility of the Champeta sound, which originates from the Colombian Caribbean coast and is marked by lively rhythms, laced with African influences.

Champeta was overshadowed by the more popular Reggaeton in the '90s. However, Tribu Baharú is among a wave of new Colombian music groups based in Bogotá who are reestablishing Champeta as a vital musical style and adding more elements to this genre.

== Biography ==
Tribu Baharú was founded in 2009 in Bogotá, Colombia. The group's members came together with the shared goal of exploring and experimenting with the rich musical traditions of their country and the African diaspora, especially the Caribbean sounds of Champeta, Soukous, and other Afro-Colombian rhythms. Their vibrant sound and energetic performances have made them popular in their home country and beyond.

== Discography ==
Tribu Baharú's music has been released through Discos Fiera, and they have recorded several albums that have gained significant popularity both in Colombia and internationally.

== Members ==
Tribu Baharú is composed of:

- Boricua - the guitarist and one of the producers for the band. His guitar riffs are a distinctive feature of the group's sound.
- Chindo - provides the solid bass lines that ground the band's vibrant music.
- Juan Sebastian Bastos - the group's sound engineer, ensures that their performances and recordings maintain a high level of quality.
- Makambille - the lead vocalist, his powerful voice and engaging stage presence are central to the band's performances.
- Moniqui - on percussions, adds depth and richness to the rhythm section.
- Pocho - the band's director, also plays the drums and contributes backing vocals, providing a steady rhythmic foundation for the group's sound.
- Shaka - serves as the band's MC, and adds another layer of vocal texture with his backing vocals.
