= Public holidays in Colombia =

There are 19 public holidays in Colombia (13 Catholic holidays and 6 Civic holidays), plus Palm and Easter Sunday. The city of Barranquilla has 2 extra holidays, celebrating Monday and Tuesday of Carnival. The city of Cartagena has a week of holiday, the week of November 11, celebrating The Independence of Cartagena.

Since 1983, 10 of the holidays are movable: when they do not fall on a Monday, these holidays are observed the following Monday

== National holidays ==
Original date	Date in 2026	English name	Spanish name	Type	Notes
January 1	January 1	New Year's Day	Año Nuevo	Civic	
January 6 (Note: Movable holiday.)	January 12	Epiphany	Día de los Reyes Magos	Catholic	
March 19	March 23	Saint Joseph's Day	Día de San José	Catholic	
varies	April 2	Maundy Thursday	Jueves Santo	Catholic	Thursday before Easter Sunday, variable dates in March or April.
varies	April 3	Good Friday	Viernes Santo	Catholic	Friday before Easter Sunday, variable dates in March or April.
May 1	May 1	International Workers' Day	Día Internacional de los Trabajadores	Civic	
varies	May 18	Ascension Day	Ascensión del señor	Catholic	39 days after Easter Sunday
varies	June 8	Corpus Christi	Corpus Christi	Catholic	60 days after Easter Sunday
varies	June 15	Sacred Heart	Sagrado Corazón	Catholic	68 days after Easter Sunday
June 29	June 29	Saint Peter and Saint Paul	San Pedro y San Pablo	Catholic	
July 9	July 13	Day of Our Lady of the Rosary of Chiquinquirá	Día de la Virgen de Chiquinquirá	Catholic	
July 20	July 20	Declaration of Independence of Colombia	Declaración de la Independencia de Colombia	Civic	
August 7	August 7	Battle of Boyacá	Batalla de Boyacá	Civic	
August 15	August 17	Assumption Day	La Asunción de la Virgen María	Catholic	
October 12	October 12	Columbus Day	Día de la Diversidad Étnica y Cultural	Civic	Formerly known as 'Día de la raza'
November 1	November 2	All Saints' Day	Día de Todos los Santos	Catholic	
November 11	November 16	Independence of Cartagena	Independencia de Cartagena	Civic	
December 8	December 8	Immaculate Conception	La Inmaculada Concepción	Catholic	
December 25	December 25	Christmas Day	Navidad	Catholic	

== Barranquilla holidays ==
The following are considered holidays only in the city of Barranquilla:

- Monday of Carnival (48 days before Easter Sunday or 2 days before Ash Wednesday.)
- Tuesday of Carnival (47 days before Easter Sunday or the day before Ash Wednesday.)
