= SATENA =

Airline of Colombia

SATENA — Servicio Aéreo a Territorios Nacionales Air Service to the National Territories
IATA	ICAO	Call sign
9R	NSE	SATENA
- Founded: April 12, 1962; 64 years ago
- Hubs: El Dorado International Airport
- Secondary hubs: Alfonso Bonilla Aragón International Airport; Olaya Herrera Airport
- Focus cities: Ernesto Cortissoz International Airport; La Vanguardia Airport
- Frequent-flyer program: Club Satena
- Fleet size: 22
- Destinations: 58
- Parent company: Government of Colombia
- Headquarters: Bogotá, Colombia
- Founder: Alberto Lleras Camargo
- Website: www.satena.com

SATENA (Spanish: Servicio Aéreo a Territorios Nacionales, lit. 'Air Service to the National Territories') is a state-owned airline of Colombia established to provide access to the most remote and least connected parts of the country. It is wholy-owned by the Government of Colombia and its operational mandate is fulfilled by the Colombian Aerospace Force.

The airline primarily operates out of its main hub at El Dorado International Airport in Bogotá, its secondary hub at the Olaya Herrera Airport in Medellín, and another secondary hub at Alfonso Bonilla Aragón International Airport in Cali. The airline also has sizeable operations in Barranquilla and Villavicencio and, as of July 2026, operates in 27 of the 32 Departments of Colombia.

== History ==
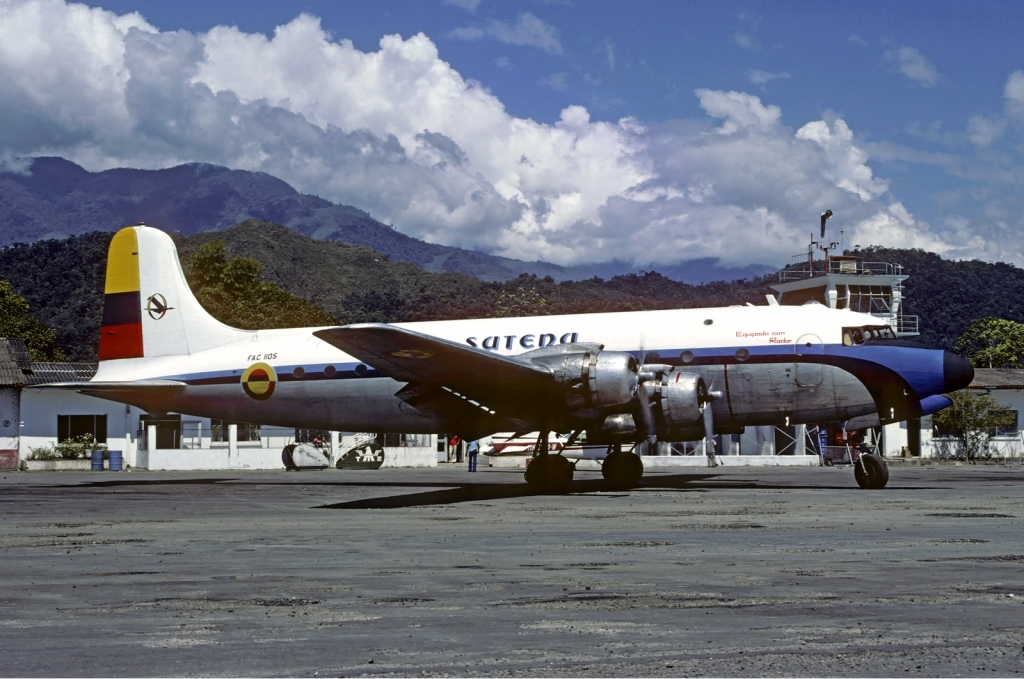
SATENA Douglas C-54 Skymaster at La Vanguardia Airport in 1980.

SATENA was first established on April 12, 1962, by then President of the Republic, Alberto Lleras Camargo, via decree to:

"to form an aerial transport service for the benefit of the underdeveloped regions of the country, with the object of promoting the welfare of educational campaigns, agricultural and pastoral development, and the economic and social progress of such territories."

To achieve this under government auspices, the airline was then entrusted to the control of the Colombian Air Force, initiating its first operations with the routes Bogotá - Leticia and Leticia – Tarapacá – El Encanto – Puerto Leguízamo. The Government equipped the company with one C-54, two C-47, two Beaver L-20, and later added two PBY Catalina amphibious, the property of the Rotary Fund of the Colombian Air Force. Later, in 1964, it added three additional C-47 and two more C-54 aircraft, all of them donated by the United States International Development Agency.

In 1965, SATENA, in coordination with the Bank of Bogotá, began a new service named AeroBanco, which was created to facilitate air travel to other areas largely or completely inaccessible by road. Due to great success in the areas served by the airline, President Carlos Lleras Restrepo put into effect Law 80 of December 12, 1968, where it was decreed that SATENA would be treated as a public establishment, with all legal functions controlled by the Ministry of National Defence.

In 1972, SATENA acquired newer British-Built AVRO HS-748 turboprops capable of carrying 48 passengers. Between 1984 and 1985, the airline incorporated two Fokker F28 jet aircraft with the capacity to transport 65 passengers.

Since its creation, the airline has performed many public services on behalf of the Colombian people, having provided service during crises in the country's history, as was the case of the Huila and Cauca earthquake of June 6, 1994, when SATENA performed search and rescue operations, airlifted residents, as well as transporting needed medicines, foods and aid in general to the site of the tragedy.

In 1996, the largest modernization of the airline began, with the arrival of six Dornier 328s capable of carrying 32 passengers. These aircraft represent the new generation of equipment for regional routes.

In 2002, SATENA incorporated into its fleet one Embraer ERJ 145 with a capacity for 50 passengers, which arrived to replace the departing Fokker F28, which was reaching its maximum airframe hours. In 2004, SATENA became the airline with the newest and most modern aerial fleet in Colombia, when it incorporated two new Embraer ERJ 145 aircraft, allowing it to perform faster and more efficient services to its most isolated destinations.

At the end of 2010, SATENA suffered a financial crisis, consisting of bank debts amounting to 120 billion pesos and losses totaling 25 billion pesos. Due to this, the National Government proposed a law that would allow the commercial airline to get out of said crisis and compete in the air transport market in the country. This law consists of capitalizing this company at 98 billion pesos, where 49% of the company's shares will be put up for sale in a democratic process and within two years, while the remaining 51% would continue in the hands of the state, something that was never done in the end.

On April 29, 2018, the airline moved all its routes to Terminal Puente Aéreo belonging to El Dorado International Airport, to facilitate the service to passengers on regional flights.

== Destinations ==
SATENA operates to the following airports (as of January 2026):

=== Colombia ===
City	Airport	IATA Code	Destinations	Notes
(Amazonas (Colombian department)) Amazonas
La Chorrera	La Chorrera Airport	LCR	Leticia San José del Guaviare	
La Pedrera	La Pedrera Airport	LPD	Leticia	
Leticia	Alfredo Vásquez Cobo International Airport	LET	La Chorrera La Predera Tarapacá	
Tarapacá	Tarapacá Airport	TCD	Leticia	
(Antioquia Department) Antioquia
Apartadó	Antonio Roldán Betancur Airport	APO	Bogotá Medellín-Olaya Herrera	
Caucasia	Juan H. White Airport	CAQ	Medellín-Olaya Herrera	
El Bagre	El Bagre Airport	EBG	Medellín-Olaya Herrera	
Medellín	Olaya Herrera Airport	EOH	Acandí Apartadó Bahía Solano Barranquilla Bogotá Bucaramanga Buenaventura Caucasia Condoto El Bagre Mompox Montelíbano Nuquí Ocaña Paipa Quibdo San Gíl Tolú Yopal Valledupar	Hub
(Arauca Department) Arauca
Arauca	Santiago Pérez Quiroz Airport	AUC	Bogotá Bucaramanga Cúcuta	
Saravena	Los Colonizadores Airport	RVE	Bogotá Bucaramanga	
Tame	Gabriel Vargas Santos Airport	TME	Bogotá	
(Atlántico Department) Atlántico
Barranquilla	Ernesto Cortissoz International Airport	BAQ	Cúcuta Medellín-Olaya Herrera Montería Riohacha Valledupar	
(Bolívar Department) Bolívar
Santa Cruz de Mompox	San Bernardo Airport	MMP	Medellín-Olaya Herrera	
Bogotá - Capital District
Bogotá	El Dorado International Airport	BOG	Aguachica Apartado Arauca Buenaventura Corozal Florencia Inírida La Macarena Medellín-Olaya Herrera Mitú Nuquí Pitalito Puerto Asís Puerto Carreño Puerto Leguízamo San José del Guaviare San Vicente del Caguán Saravena Tame Tolú Tumaco Quibdó Villagarzón Villavicencio	Hub
(Boyacá Department) Boyacá
Paipa	Juan José Rondón Airport	RON	Medellín-Olaya Herrera	
(Caquetá Department) Caquetá
Florencia	Gustavo Artunduaga Paredes Airport	FLA	Bogotá Cali Puerto Leguízamo	
San Vicente del Caguán	Eduardo Falla Solano Airport	SVI	Bogotá	
(Casanare Department) Casanare
Yopal	El Alcaraván Airport	RON	Medellín-Olaya Herrera	
(Cauca Department) Cauca
Guapi	Guapi Airport	GPI	Cali Popayán	
Popayán	Guillermo León Valencia Airport	PPN	Guapi Timbiquí	
Timbiquí	Timbiqui Airport	TBD	Cali Popayán	
(Cesar Department) Cesar
Aguachica	Hacaritama Airport	HAY	Bogotá	
Valledupar	Alfonso López Pumarejo Airport	VUP	Barranquilla Medellín-Olaya Herrera	
(Chocó Department) Chocó
Acandí	Alcides Fernández Airport	ACD	Medellín-Olaya Herrera	
Bahía Solano	José Celestino Mutis Airport	BSC	Cali Medellín-Olaya Herrera Quibdó	
Condoto	Mandinga Airport	COG	Cali Medellín-Olaya Herrera	
Nuquí	Reyes Murillo Airport	NQU	Bogotá Cali Medellín-Olaya Herrera Quibdó	
Quibdó	El Caraño Airport	UIB	Bahía Solano Bogotá Medellín-Olaya Herrera Nuquí	
(Córdoba Department) Córdoba
Montelíbano	Montelíbano Airport	MTB	Medellín-Olaya Herrera	
Montería	Los Garzones Airport	MTR	Barranquilla	
(Guainía Department) Guainía
Inírida	César Gaviria Trujillo Airport	PDA	Bogotá Villavicencio	
(Guaviare Department) Guaviare
San José del Guaviare	Jorge Enrique González Torres Airport	SJE	Bogotá La Chorrera	
(Huila Department) Huila
Neiva	Benito Salas Airport	NVA	Cali	
Pitalito	Contador Airport	PTX	Bogotá Cali	
(La Guajira Department) La Guajira
Riohacha	Almirante Padilla Airport	RCH	Barranquilla	
(Meta Department) Meta
La Macarena	La Macarena Airport	LMC	Bogotá Villavicencio	
Villavicencio	La Vanguardia Airport	VVC	Bogotá Inírida La Macarena Mitú Puerto Carreño	Focus city
(Nariño Department) Nariño
El Charco	El Charco Airport	ECR	Cali	
Tumaco	La Florida Airport	TCO	Bogotá Cali	
(Norte de Santander Department) Norte de Santander
Cúcuta	Camilo Daza International Airport	CUC	Arauca Barranquilla Ocaña Tibú	
Ocaña	Aguas Claras Airport	OCV	Cúcuta Medellín-Olaya Herrera	
Tibú	Tibú Airport	TIB	Cúcuta	
(Putumayo Department) Putumayo
Puerto Asís	Tres de Mayo Airport	PUU	Bogotá Cali Ipiales Puerto Leguízamo	
Puerto Leguízamo	Caucayá Airport	LQM	Bogotá Florencia Puerto Asís	
Villagarzón	Villa Garzón Airport	VGZ	Bogotá	
(Archipelago of San Andrés, Providencia and Santa Catalina) San Andrés y Providencia
Providencia	El Embrujo Airport	PVA	San Andrés	
San Andrés	Gustavo Rojas Pinilla International Airport	ADZ	Providencia	
(Santander Department) Santander
Bucaramanga	Palonegro International Airport	BGA	Arauca Saravena	
San Gil	Los Pozos Airport	LPZ	Medellín-EOH	
(Sucre Department) Sucre
Corozal	Las Brujas Airport	CZU	Bogotá	
Tolú	Golfo de Morrosquillo Airport	TLU	Bogotá Medellín-EOH	
(Valle del Cauca Department) Valle del Cauca
Buenaventura	Gerardo Tobar López Airport	BUN	Bogotá	
Cali	Alfonso Bonilla Aragón International Airport	CLO	Bahía Solano Condoto El Charco Florencia Guapi Ipiales Neiva Nuquí Pitalito Puerto Asís Timbiquí Tumaco	Hub
(Vaupés Department) Vaupés
Mitú	Fabio Alberto León Bentley Airport	MVP	Bogotá Villavicencio	
(Vichada Department) Vichada
Puerto Carreño	Germán Olano Airport	PCR	Bogotá Villavicencio	

=== Interline Agreements ===
- APG Airlines

== Fleet ==
=== Current fleet ===
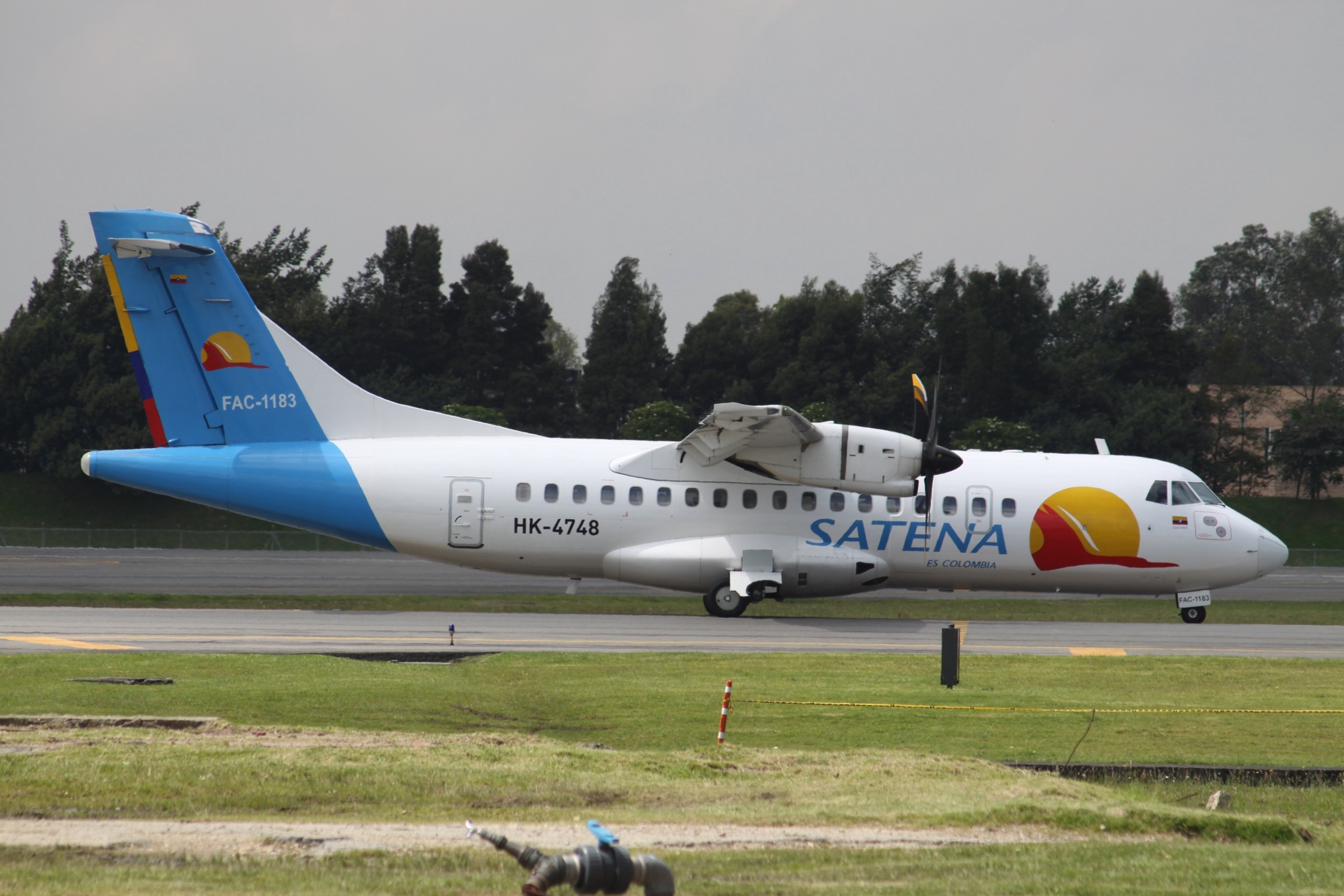
A SATENA ATR 42-500 at El Dorado International Airport in 2012

As of July 2026, SATENA operates the following aircraft:

SATENA fleet
Aircraft	In service	Orders	Passengers	Notes
ATR 42-500	3	—	48	
ATR 42-600	6	—	48	
ATR 72-600	6	—	70	
DHC-6 Twin Otter	5	3	19	Includes the 1,000th DHC-6 Twin Otter aircraft ever built
Embraer ERJ-145	2	—	50	To be retired.
Total	22	4		

=== Former fleet ===
As of November 2025, Satena operated 4 ATR 42-500, 6 ATR 42-600, 5 ATR 72-600, 4 De Havilland Canada DHC-6 Twin Otter and 2 Embraer ERJ 145

SATENA also formerly operated the following aircraft:

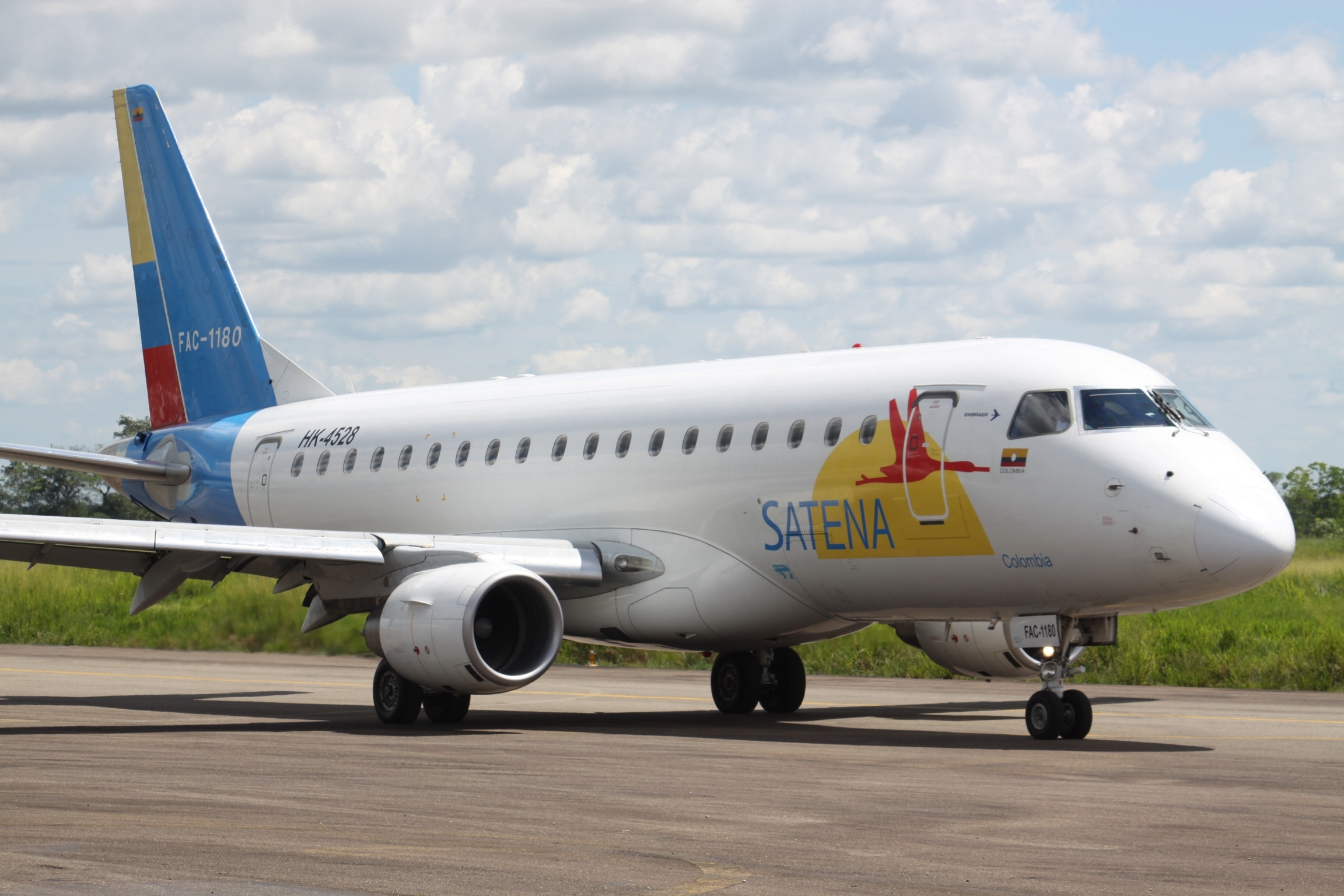
A SATENA Embraer ERJ-170 at La Vanguardia Airport in 2012.

- ATR 72-500
- Boeing 727-100 (1995-2001)
- Boeing 727-200 (1996-2001)
- CASA C-212 Aviocar (1984-1997)4 ATR
- de Havilland Canada DHC-2 Beaver (1962-2005)
- Dornier 328 (1996-2013)
- Douglas C-47 Skytrain (1962-1977)
- Douglas C-54 Skymaster (1962-1994)
- Douglas DC-9-10 (1993-1994)
- Embraer EMB 120 Brasilia (2003-2004)
- Embraer ERJ-170 (2020-2022)
- Fokker F-28 Fellowship (1984-1998)
- Harbin Y-12E (2014-2025)
- Hawker Siddeley HS 748 (1972-1997)
- PBY Catalina (1962-1972)
- Pilatus PC-6 Porter (1981-1997)

== Accidents and incidents ==
- On September 8, 1969, a Douglas C-47 FAC-685 crashed near Apiay Air Force Base; all 32 people on board died. The aircraft was operating a domestic scheduled passenger flight from Monterrey Airport to Apiay.
- On January 21, 1972, a Douglas DC-3 FAC-661 crashed at San Nicolas whilst operating a domestic non-scheduled passenger flight from Enrique Olaya Herrera Airport, Medellín to Gerardo Tobar López Airport, Buenaventura.
- On January 9, 1974, a HS 748 (FAC 1103) crashed into the Gabinete Peak 50 km north of Gustavo Artunduaga Paredes Airport Florencia whilst on a flight from Florencia to Bogota. All 31 people on board died.
- On January 8, 1975, a Douglas DC-3 (FAC-688) crashed shortly after take-off from Benito Salas Airport, Neiva on a flight to Gustavo Artunduaga Paredes Airport, Florencia. All 30 people on board died.
- On May 3, 1975, a Douglas DC-3 (FAC-663) crashed at Sardinata. The aircraft was on a domestic scheduled passenger flight from Aguas Claras Airport, Ocaña to Camilo Daza Airport, Cúcuta. Three of the six occupants died.
- On April 2, 1976, a Douglas DC-3 (FAC-676) crashed on approach to Tres de Mayo Airport, Puerto Asís. The aircraft was on a flight from Gustavo Artunduaga Paredes Airport, Florencia. Five of the 16 people on board died.
- On February 17, 1977, a Douglas C-47B (FAC-1125) was damaged beyond economic repair in a take-off accident at Fabio Alberto León Bentley Airport, Mitú. All 28 people on board survived.
- On November 20, 1977, a Douglas C-47B (FAC-1127) crashed in Colombia.
- On November 20, 1977, a Douglas C-47A (FAC-1120) crashed at Llanos del Yori, Colombia.
- On February 21, 1978, a Douglas DC-3 (FAC-668) crashed at Serranía los Cobardes in Colombia.
- On June 25, 1981, a Douglas C-47 (FAC-1129) was damaged beyond repair in an accident. The aircraft was subsequently withdrawn from use and stored at La Vanguardia Airport, Villavicencio.
- On May 3, 1983, a Douglas C-47B (FAC-1126) was damaged beyond repair in an accident at Palmaseca Airport, Cali.
- On May 5, 2010, an Embraer ERJ-145 overran the runway at Fabio Alberto León Bentley Airport, Mitú, Colombia. The aircraft crashed through the airport fence and then came to rest in a field, suffering substantial damage. None of the 37 passengers and 4 crew were injured. The runway at the time of the accident was wet as it had recently rained in the area.
- On January 28, 2026, a Beechcraft 1900D operating as Flight 8849 went missing shortly after takeoff from Cucuta, Colombia. The flight was later found and no survivors were found out of the 15 passengers and crew.

== See also ==
- List of airlines of Colombia
