= Villa Garzón Airport =

- IATA: VGZ; ICAO: SKVG

Summary
- Airport type: Public
- Location: Villa Garzón, Colombia
- Elevation AMSL: 1,248 ft / 380 m
- Coordinates: 0°58′55″N 76°36′15″W

Map
- Location of the airport in Colombia

Runways
| Direction | Length | | Surface |
| Direction | m | ft | Surface |
|---|---|---|---|
| 17/35 | 1,485 | 4,872 | Asphalt |
- Sources: GCM Google Maps

Villa Garzón Airport (IATA: VGZ, ICAO: SKVG) is an airport serving Villa Garzón, a town in the Putumayo Department of Colombia, also serving the town of Mocoa. The airport is 5 kilometres (3 mi) south of Villa Garzón.

== Airlines and destinations ==
| Airlines | Destinations |
|---|---|
| SATENA | Bogotá |

== See also ==
- Transport in Colombia
- List of airports in Colombia
