= Puerto Umbria =

- Populated center
- Location in Putumayo Department and Colombia Puerto Umbria (Colombia)
- Coordinates: 0°51′38.16″N 76°34′48″W
- Country: Colombia
- Department: Putumayo Department
- Municipality: Villagarzón
- Elevation: 1,175 ft (358 m)

Population (2005)
  - Total: 588
- Time zone: UTC-5 (Colombia Standard Time)

Puerto Umbria is a populated center of Colombia in Villagarzón Municipality, Putumayo Department Department in Colombia.

== Climate ==
Puerto Umbria has a tropical rainforest climate (Af) with heavy to very heavy rainfall year-round.

Climate data for Puerto Umbria
Month	Jan	Feb	Mar	Apr	May	Jun	Jul	Aug	Sep	Oct	Nov	Dec	Year
Mean daily maximum °C (°F)	30.5 (86.9)	30.0 (86.0)	29.7 (85.5)	29.4 (84.9)	29.0 (84.2)	28.8 (83.8)	28.9 (84.0)	29.6 (85.3)	30.0 (86.0)	30.4 (86.7)	30.4 (86.7)	30.4 (86.7)	29.8 (85.6)
Daily mean °C (°F)	25.4 (77.7)	25.1 (77.2)	25.0 (77.0)	24.8 (76.6)	24.5 (76.1)	24.3 (75.7)	24.3 (75.7)	24.6 (76.3)	25.0 (77.0)	25.3 (77.5)	25.5 (77.9)	25.4 (77.7)	24.9 (76.9)
Mean daily minimum °C (°F)	20.3 (68.5)	20.3 (68.5)	20.3 (68.5)	20.2 (68.4)	20.0 (68.0)	19.9 (67.8)	19.7 (67.5)	19.6 (67.3)	20.0 (68.0)	20.3 (68.5)	20.6 (69.1)	20.5 (68.9)	20.1 (68.3)
Average rainfall mm (inches)	236.2 (9.30)	255.6 (10.06)	375.2 (14.77)	482.0 (18.98)	480.6 (18.92)	442.2 (17.41)	372.4 (14.66)	260.4 (10.25)	308.6 (12.15)	350.8 (13.81)	373.3 (14.70)	332.7 (13.10)	4,270 (168.11)
Average rainy days	15	14	21	22	24	23	21	19	17	19	19	19	233
Average relative humidity (%)	86	86	88	88	89	89	88	86	85	85	86	86	87
Mean monthly sunshine hours	136.4	98.8	86.8	90.0	89.9	81.0	89.9	117.8	126.0	142.6	132.0	139.5	1,330.7
Mean daily sunshine hours	4.4	3.5	2.8	3.0	2.9	2.7	2.9	3.8	4.2	4.6	4.4	4.5	3.6
Source 1: IDEAM
Source 2: Climate-Data.org
