= Peregoyo =

Colombian musician and songwriter (1917–2007)

- Born: Luis Enrique Urbano Tenorio; 10 January 1917; Buenaventura, Colombia
- Died: 18 October 2007 (aged 90) Cali, Colombia

Luis Enrique Urbano Tenorio (Note: In this Spanish name, the first or paternal surname is Urbano and the second or maternal family name is Tenorio.) (1917–2007), known as Peregoyo, was a Colombian musician and songwriter. He achieved national success in Colombia in the 1960s with his band the Combo Vacaná, and is "recognised as having been an innovator in Pacific folk music".

== Early life and music career ==
Luis Enrique Urbano Tenorio was born on 10 January 1917 in Buenaventura, in the Colombian department of Valle del Cauca. He was one of eight children, and his parents were from Timbiquí. As a child Urbano learned to play guitar, bandola, violin, and cello. Later he studied composition and learned saxophone, and was a member of the municipal band of Buenaventura. Manuel María Burbano, leader of the band (along with several other municipal bands), taught Urbano to read and write sheet music.

Urbano formed his first orchestra, the Combo Vacaná, in 1962. Vacaná is a portmanteau of the departmental names of Valle, Cauca, and Nariño, where the members of the band came from. Other members of the band included:

- Aristarco Torres (alto saxophone)
- Henry Carvajal (bass)
- José Lorenzo (guitar)
- Emiliano Valencia (percussion)
- Arcesio López (percussion)
- Álvaro Cifuentes (trumpet)
- Markitos Micolta (vocals)

The Combo Vacaná's first record was a 45rpm single released by Sonolux in 1962, which included the song "Mi Peregoyo", written by Urbano and with vocals by Otto Palma. The word "peregoyo" is derived from the word emperegoyado, used in the Colombian Pacific to mean "well-dressed". The success of the song led to Urbano's nickname of Peregoyo, which he initially disliked but came to embrace. The Combo Vacaná also recorded some singles accompanied on vocals by Leonor González Mina, including a version of the currulao "Mi Buenaventura", written by Petronio Álvarez.

Later the Combo Vacaná signed an exclusive contract with Discos Fuentes and released four albums that were nationally successful, beginning with their debut Mi Buenaventura in 1967. Los 600 de Latinoamérica described the album as combining "Afro-Colombian genres with Caribbean influences". The Combo Vacaná disbanded in 1969 over a disagreement about the purchase of amplifiers for a planned concert at the Cali Fair. They reformed sporadically from the mid-1980s onwards, and in 2004 recorded an album for Dutch record label Otrabanda.

== Personal life and death ==
Peregoyo taught drawing, calligraphy, and music for 33 years at the Pascual de Andagoya School in Buenaventura. He lived off his teacher's pension in later life; according to his wife, he only ever received one royalty check for COL$70,000 in the 1980s. Peregoyo died on 18 October 2007 in Cali. He was married to María Inés Sánchez for over six decades, and she died a few months before him.

== Musical style and compositions ==
Peregoyo and the Combo Vacaná were the first band to achieve national success playing music from the Pacific region of Colombia.

The Combo Vacaná played currulao in a different style than was traditional, replacing the marimba de chonta with saxophones, trumpets, and electric guitar. Music researcher Oscar Hernández Salgar wrote that "Peregoyo and his Vacaná combo in the sixties and seventies opened the possibility of listening to currulaos with instrumentation different from that of the marimba ensemble...the effect of this act was enormous, since many Colombians heard for the first time a currulao in orchestral format and "Mi Buenaventura" became synonymous with this genre in the national imagination."

Peregoyo wrote over 120 songs, many of which were not recorded. His notable compositions include "Mi Peregoyo", "Noches tibias", "Ensoñación", "Ana Cecilia", and "Al prisionero".

== Albums with the Combo Vacaná ==
- Mi Buenaventura (1967, Discos Fuentes). Reissued as Tropicalisimo by World Circuit in 1995.
- Descarga Vacaná (1968, Discos Fuentes)
- De Parranda (1969, Discos Fuentes)
- Sacale Brillo Teresa (1970, Discos Fuentes)
- El Rey de Currulao (2004, Otrabanda Records)
