= San Bernardo Airport =

- IATA: MMP; ICAO: SKMP

Summary
- Airport type: Public
- Serves: Santa Cruz de Mompox, Colombia
- Elevation AMSL: 63 ft / 19 m
- Coordinates: 9°15′35″N 74°26′16″W

Map
- Location of the airport in Colombia

Runways
Direction	Length		Surface
Direction	m	ft	Surface
02/20	1,230	4,035	Asphalt
- Source: GCM Google Maps

San Bernardo Airport (IATA: MMP, ICAO: SKMP) is an airport serving the city of Santa Cruz de Mompox, or Mompós, in the Bolívar Department of Colombia. The airport is 2 kilometres (1.2 mi) northwest of the town, near the Brazo De Mompos River, an arm of the Magdalena River.

The runway length includes 29 metres (95 ft) overruns at each end.

== Airlines and destinations ==
Airlines	Destinations
SATENA	Cartagena, Medellín–Olaya Herrera

== See also ==
- Transport in Colombia
- List of airports in Colombia
