= Guillermo León Valencia Airport =

Guillermo León Valencia Airport Aeropuerto Guillermo León Valencia
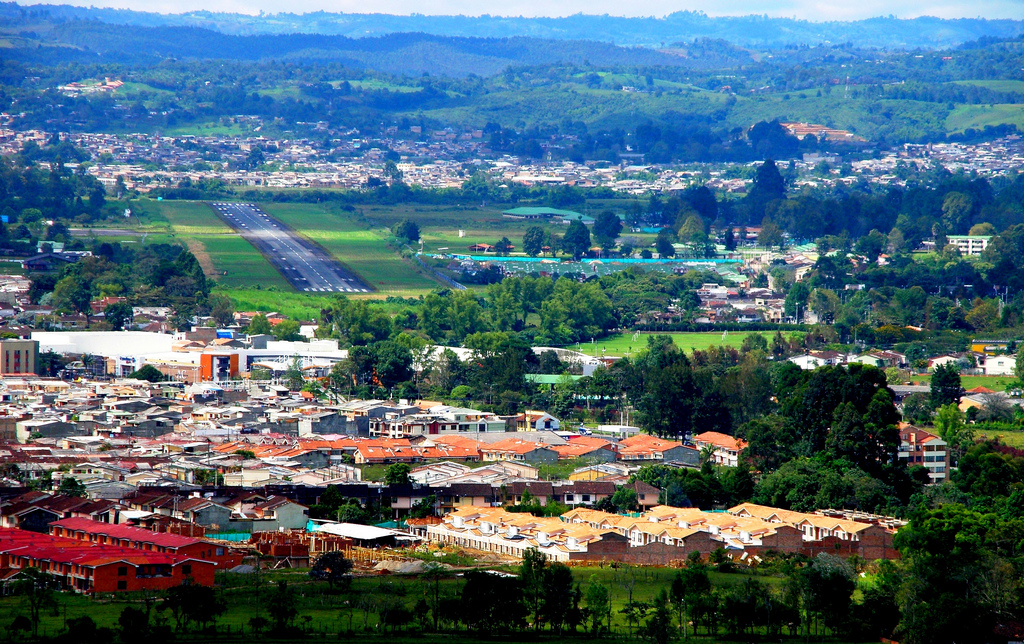
- IATA: PPN; ICAO: SKPP

Summary
- Airport type: Public
- Operator: Government
- Serves: Popayán, Colombia
- Elevation AMSL: 5,687 ft / 1,733 m
- Coordinates: 2°27′15″N 76°36′35″W

Map
- Location of airport in Colombia

Runways
Direction	Length		Surface
Direction	m	ft	Surface
08/26	1,850	6,070	Asphalt
- Source: WAD GCM

Guillermo León Valencia Airport (Spanish: Aeropuerto Guillermo León Valencia) (IATA: PPN, ICAO: SKPP) is an airport serving Popayán, the capital city of the Cauca Department in Colombia. It took the name of former President of Colombia Guillermo León Valencia Muñoz.

== Airlines and destinations ==
Airlines	Destinations
Avianca	Bogotá
Clic	Bogotá
SATENA	Guapi, Timbiquí

== See also ==
- Transport in Colombia
- List of airports in Colombia
