= Candelario Obeso =

Colombian poet

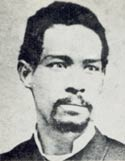
- Born: Candelario Obeso Hernández; 12 January 1849; Mompox, Bolívar
- Died: 3 July 1884 (aged 35); Bogotá, Colombia
- Occupation: poet

Candelario Obeso (12 January 1849 – 3 July 1884) was a Colombian poet. He is known as a precursor of the Poesía Negra y oscura (black and dark poetry) in Colombia.

== Life ==
Obeso was biracial, born of a white hacendado and a black maid in Mompox, Colombia on 12 January 1849. He studied at Colegio Pinillos de Mompox. In 1886 he obtained a scholarship to do his higher studies at Colegio Militar de Bogotá, and a year later he entered the Universidad Nacional de Colombia where he started engineering, law and political science, but due to economic struggle, he was unable to graduate from any faculty.

He had several jobs during short periods of time. Due to his friendship with influential personalities of the time, he was named consul in Tours, France and national interpreter in Panama. He also worked as a school teacher in Sucre and municipal treasurer of Magangué.

He faced racial discrimination and economical struggle. He fell in love with a white high-society woman who rejected his poems on love and who soon got engaged to a rich man. Heartbroken, he shot himself in the chest and died in Bogotá a few days later. His remains are in the cemetery of Mompox.

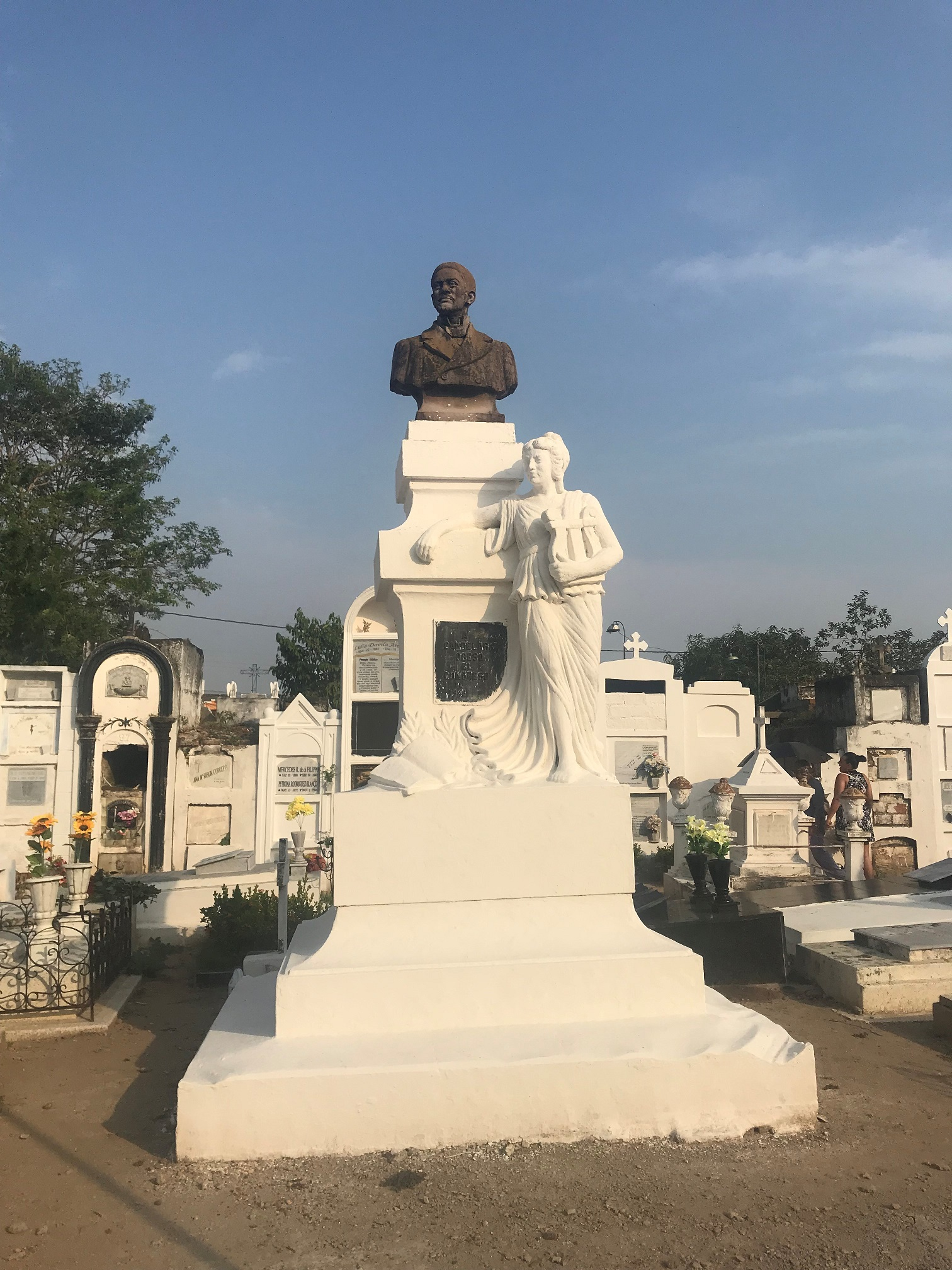
Candelario Obeso's gravestone in Mompox cemetery

== Legacy ==
“Siendo probe alimales lo palomos; A la jente a sé jente noj enseñan; E su condúta la mejó cactilla; Hai en sus moros efertiva cencia!...”

— Part of the poem Los palomos. Candelario Obeso

He is known as the precursor of the Poesía Negra y oscura (black and dark poetry) in Colombia, a literary style that focused on describing the daily activities performed by the Colombian black communities. He wrote his narrative in the first person and using the language the Afrocolombian communities spoke. An example of this is his first book of poems, Cantos Populares de mi Tierra, published by Imprenta de Borda in 1887.

He also wrote La familia Pygmalion (1871), Lectura para ti (1878), Secundino el Zapatero (1880) and Lucha de la vida (1882).

He translated into Spanish Shakespeare's Othello, and works from Víctor Hugo, Byron, Musset, Longfellow, Goethe and Jonathan Lawrence.
