= Guapi Airport =

Guapi Airport Juan Casiano Airport
- IATA: GPI; ICAO: SKGP

Summary
- Airport type: Public
- Operator: Aerocivil
- Serves: Guapi, Colombia
- Elevation AMSL: 32 ft / 10 m
- Coordinates: 2°34′15″N 77°53′52″W

Map
- Location of airport in Colombia

Runways
Direction	Length		Surface
Direction	m	ft	Surface
01/19	1,297	4,255	Asphalt
- Sources: GCM WAD Google Maps

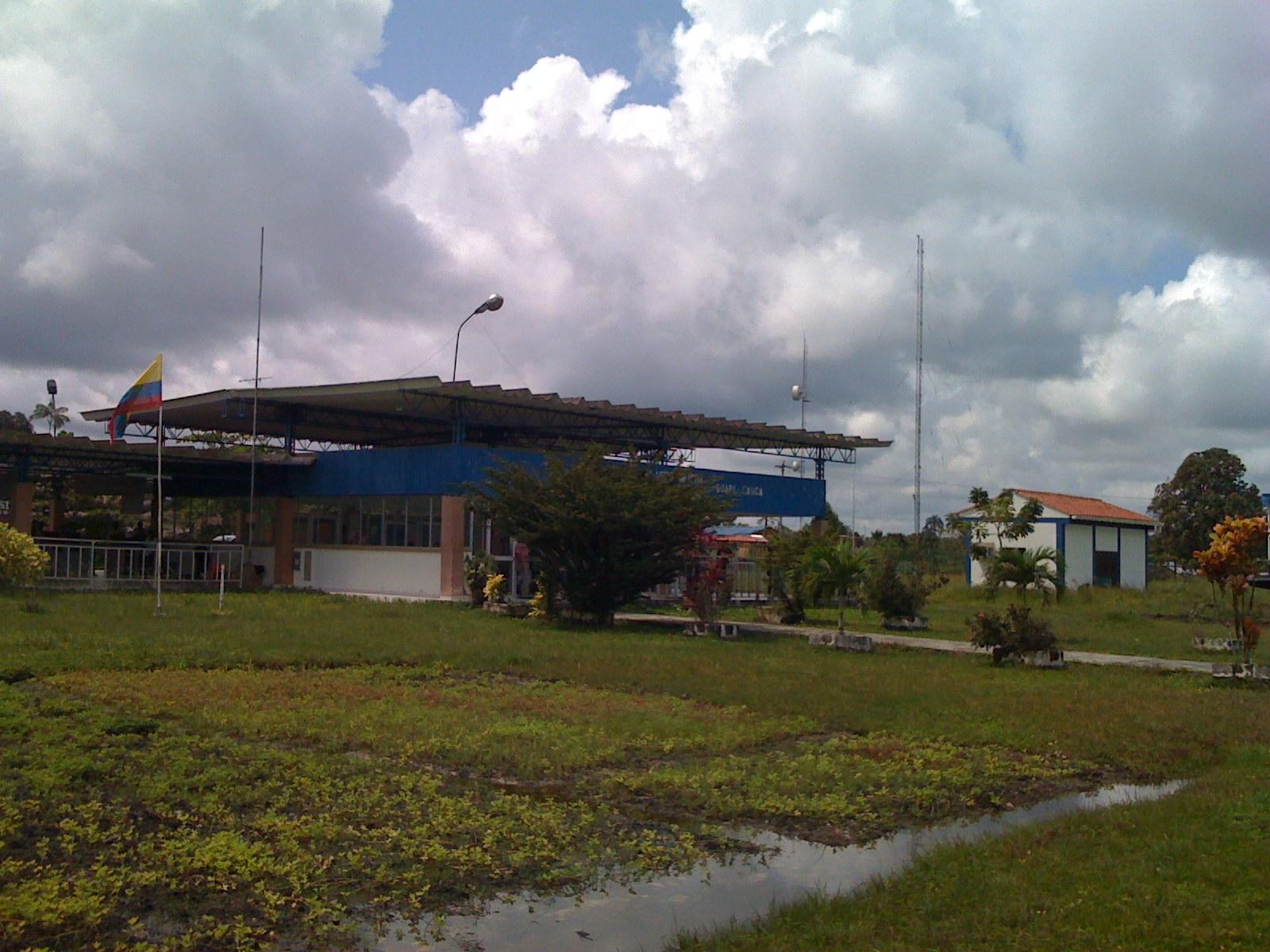
Airport terminal in the town of Guapi, Cauca, Guapi, Colombia.

Guapi Airport (IATA: GPI, ICAO: SKGP), also known as Juan Casiano Airport (Spanish: Aeropuerto "Juan Casiano Solis" de Guapi) is an airport serving Guapi, a municipality in the Cauca Department of Colombia.

The Guapi non-directional beacon (Ident: GPI) is located on the field.

== Airlines and destinations ==
Airlines	Destinations
SATENA	Cali, Popayán

== See also ==
- Transport in Colombia
- List of airports in Colombia
