= Gerardo Tobar López Airport =

Gerardo Tobar López Airport Aeropuerto Gerardo Tobar López
- IATA: BUN; ICAO: SKBU

Summary
- Airport type: Public
- Serves: Buenaventura, Colombia
- Elevation AMSL: 48 ft (15 m)
- Coordinates: 3°49′10″N 76°59′35″W

Map
- Location of airport in Colombia

Runways
Direction	Length		Surface
Direction	m	ft	Surface
09/27	1,200	3,937	Asphalt
- Sources: WAD GCM

Gerardo Tobar López Airport (IATA: BUN, ICAO: SKBU) is an airport serving the Pacific coastal port of Buenaventura in the Valle del Cauca Department of Colombia. The runway is 6 kilometres (3.7 mi) south of the city.

== Airlines and destinations ==
Airlines	Destinations
SATENA	Bogotá

== See also ==
- Transport in Colombia
- List of airports in Colombia
