= Raúl Cuero =

Colombian biologist

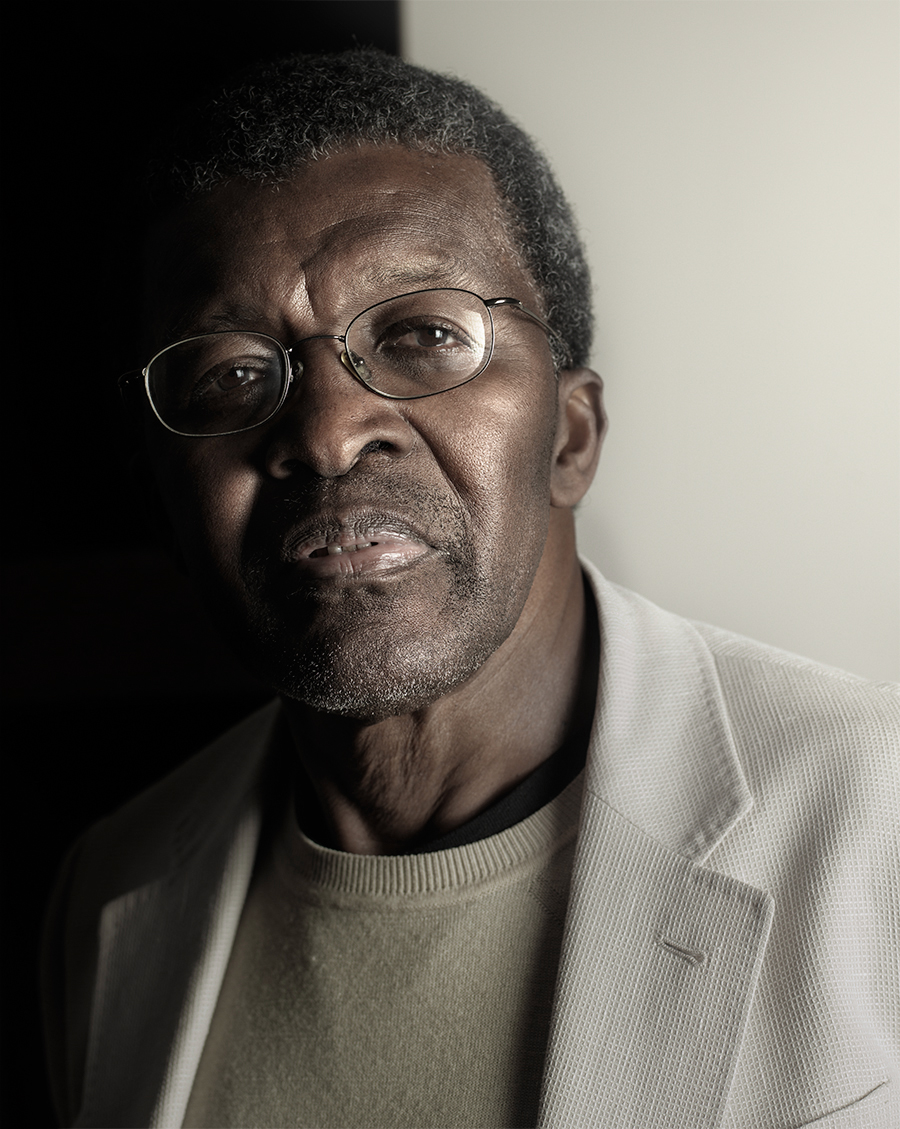
- Raúl Cuero during an interview in Bogotá, May 1, 2013
- Born: Raúl Gonzalo Cuero Rengifo; 1948 (age 77–78); Buenaventura, Colombia
- Education: Heidelberg University; University of Valle
- Scientific career
- Fields: Microbiology

Raúl Gonzalo Cuero Rengifo (born 1948 in Buenaventura, Colombia) is a Colombian professor of microbiology. From 1988 through 2012 he was a professor at Prairie View A&M University researching biological resistance to ultraviolet light. The work was supported in part by NASA and led to at least one publication and patent. During this period, Colombian media portrayed Cuero as "one of the greatest scientists in the world" who was internationally acknowledged as one of the greatest Colombian inventors, stated he had over 100 publications in scientific journals, and claimed he had won a significant award from NASA. Since 2012, he has been the research director of International Park of Creativity, an organization of which he is the founder.
