= Timbiqui Airport =

Timbiqui Airport Aeropuerto de Timbiquí
- IATA: TBD; ICAO: SKMB; LID: SK-142

Summary
- Airport type: Public
- Serves: Timbiqui, Colombia
- Elevation AMSL: 52 ft (16 m)
- Coordinates: 2°46′40″N 77°40′05″W

Map
- Location of the airport in Colombia

Runways
Direction	Length		Surface
Direction	m	ft	Surface
16/34	1,300	4,265	Grass
- Source: GCM Google Maps

Timbiqui Airport (IATA: TBD, ICAO: SKMB) is an airport serving Timbiquí, a town and municipality in the Cauca Department of Colombia. The runway angles northwest from the center of the town. The town and airport are on the east bank of the Timbiqui River, 8 kilometres (5.0 mi) inland from the Pacific Ocean.

== Airlines and destinations ==
Airlines	Destinations
SATENA	Cali, Popayán
TAC	Cali

== See also ==
- Transport in Colombia
- List of airports in Colombia
