= Bartolo Valencia Ramos =

Colombian politician (born 1965)

Mayor of Buenaventura, Valle del Cauca
- In office 2012–2015
- Preceded by: José Félix Ocoró Minota

Buenaventura city Council
- In office 1998–2003

Personal details
- Born: Bartolo Valencia Ramos; October 17 of 1954 Buenaventura
- Party: Partido Liberal Colombiano
- Spouse: Luz Alba Martínez de Valencia
- Relations: Catholicism
- Children: 1
- Education: Universidad Santiago de Cali
- Occupation: Politician, Lawyer

Bartolo Valencia Ramos (born 1965) is a Colombian politician who has been the 9th Mayor of Buenaventura, Valle del Cauca, since elected in 2012. He was elected as part of the Partido Liberal Colombiano political campaign. He served as a Member of the Buenaventura City Council as a member of the Liberal Party from 1998 until 2003.
