= Santa Cruz de Mompox =

Santa Cruz de Mompós
- Municipality
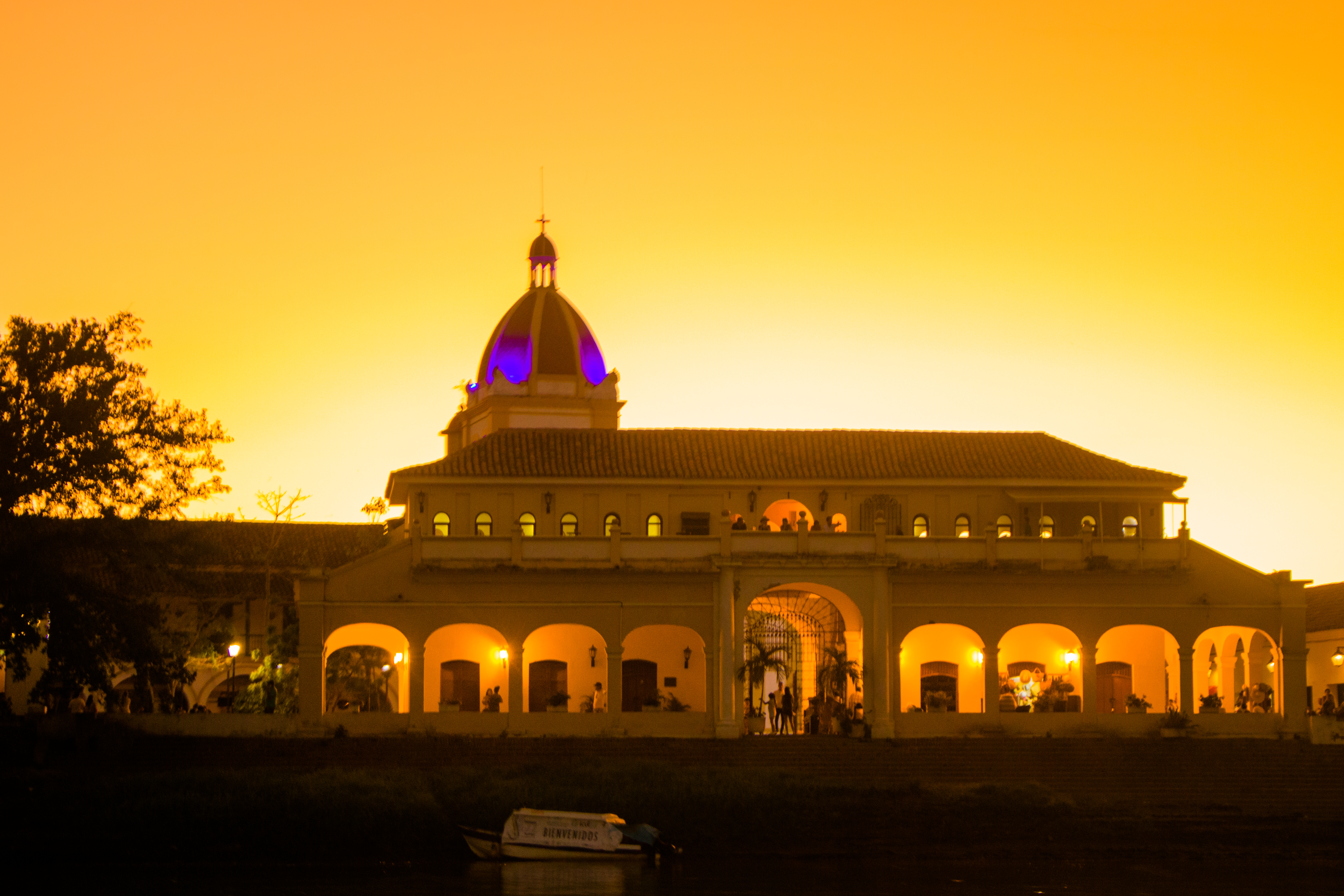
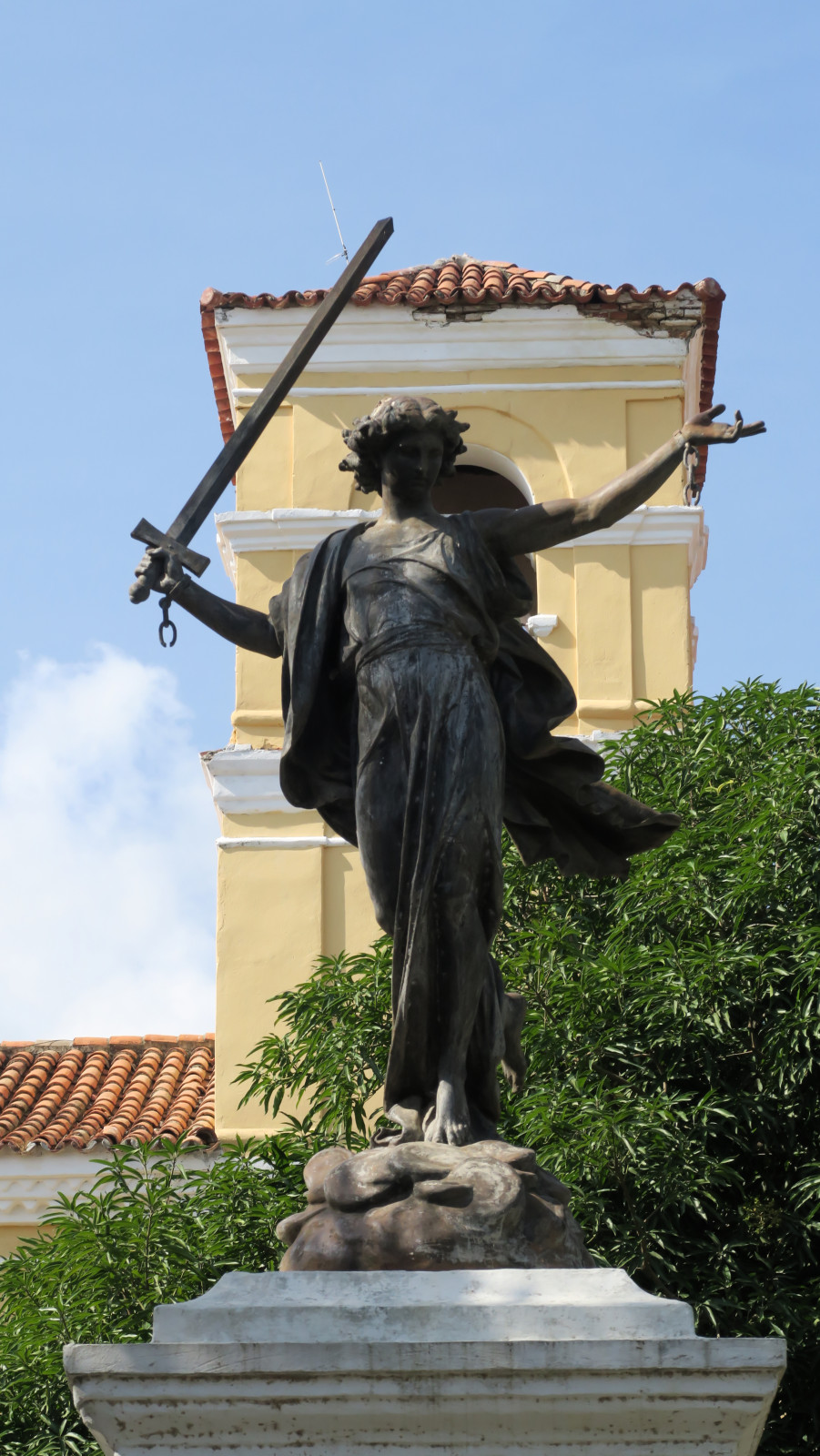
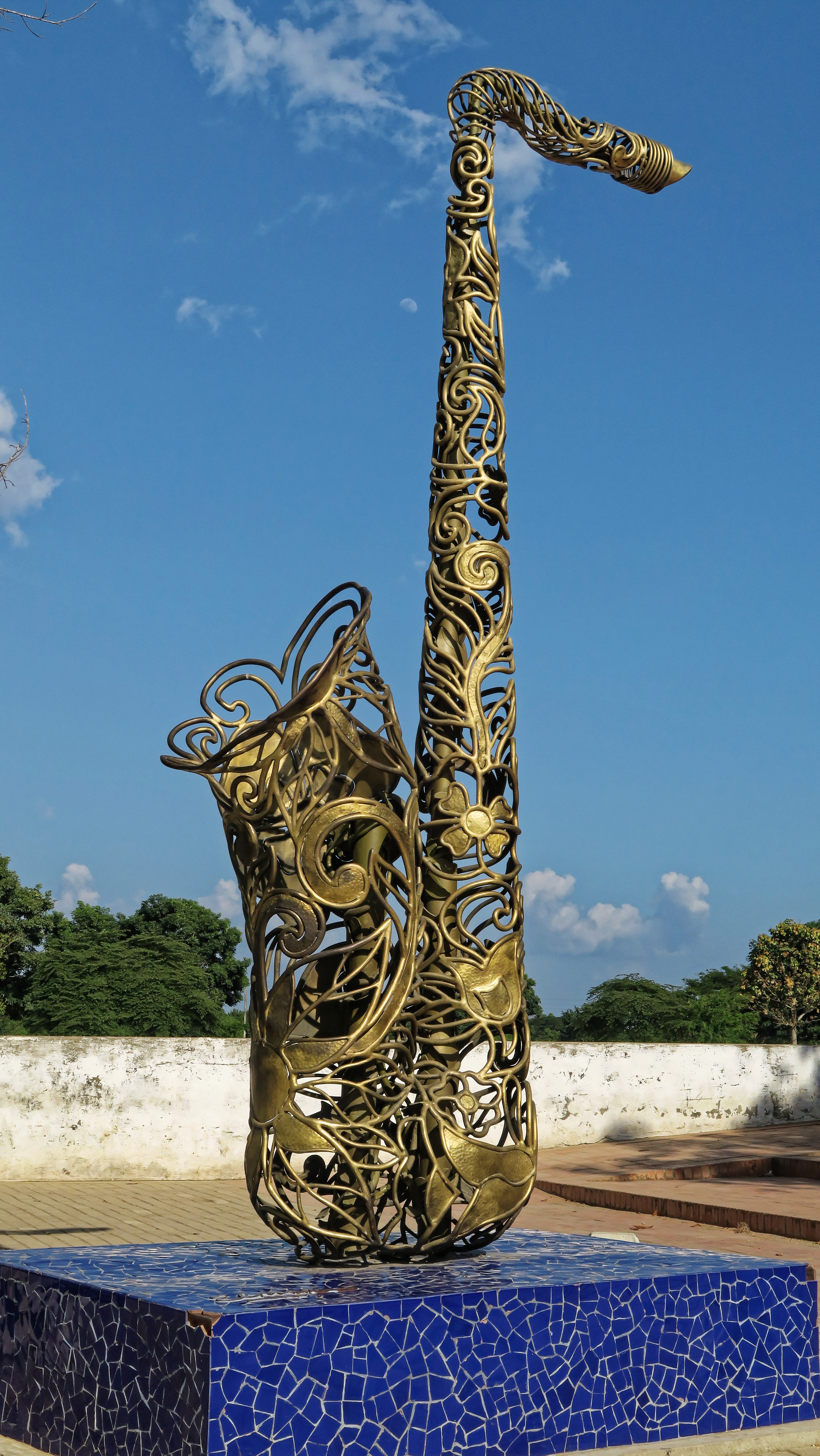
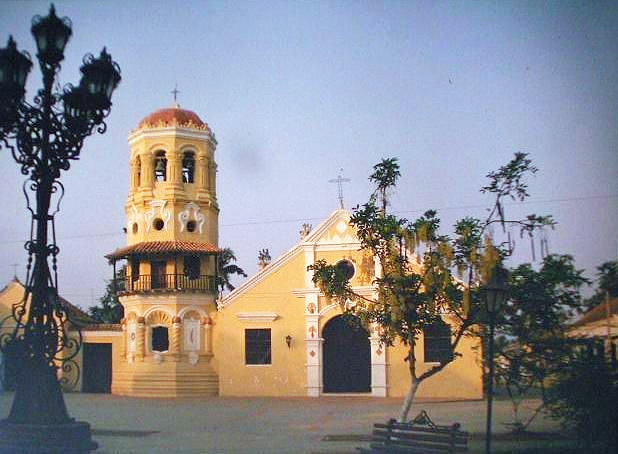
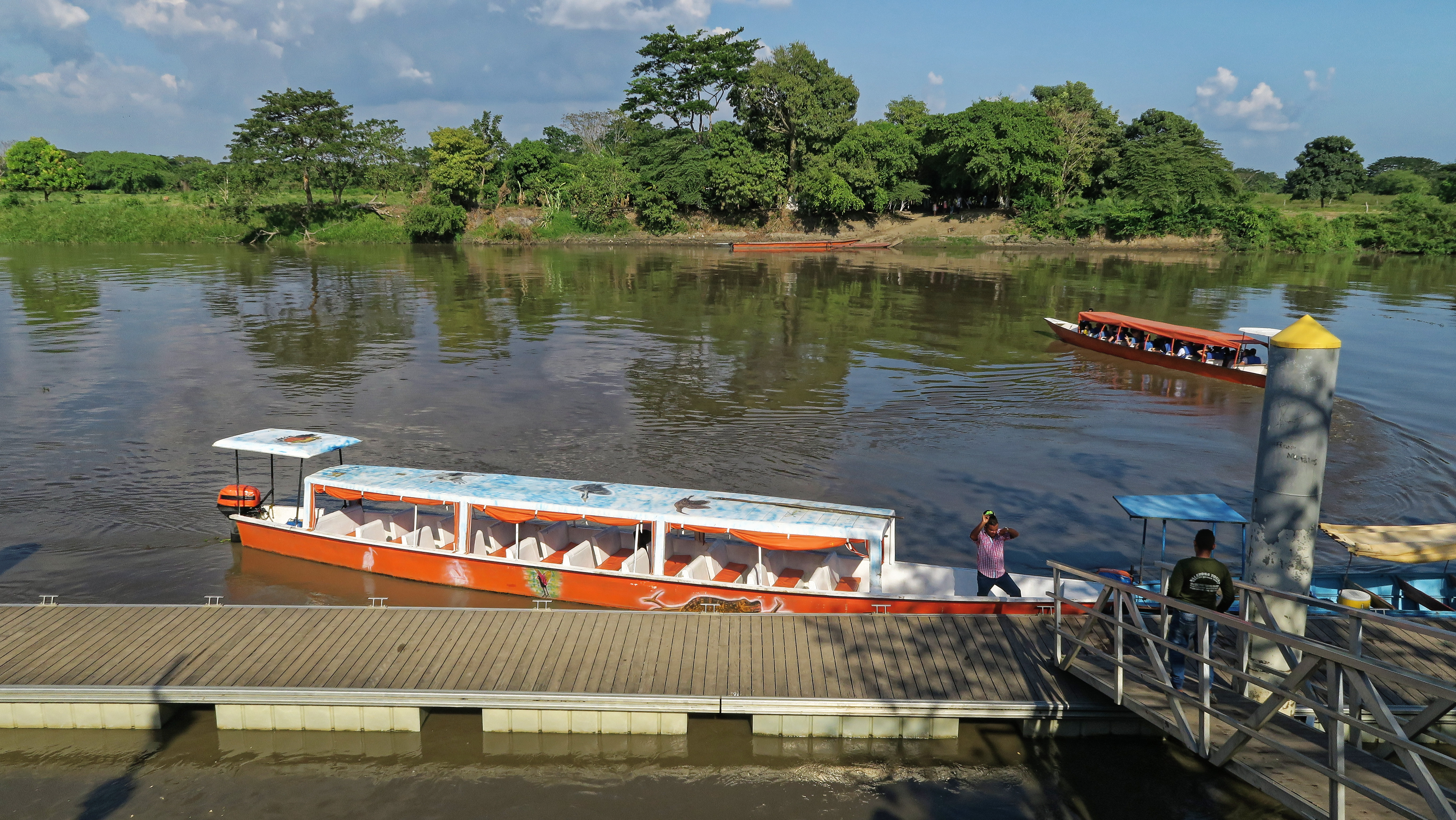

- Flag Coat of arms

- Municipality and town of Mompox in the Bolivar Department.
- Country: Colombia
- Region: Caribbean Region
- Department: Bolivar Department
- Foundation: 3 May 1537
- Founder: Alonso de Heredia

Government
  - Mayor: Guillermo Santos Anaya

Area
  - Municipality: 652.1 km^{2} (251.8 sq mi)
  - Urban: 4.53 km^{2} (1.75 sq mi)
- Elevation: 33 m (108 ft)

Population (2020 est.)
  - Municipality: 46,408
  - Density: 71.17/km^{2} (184.3/sq mi)
  - Urban: 23,649
  - Urban density: 5,220/km^{2} (13,500/sq mi)
- Time zone: UTC-5 (Colombia Standard Time)
- Website: Official website

UNESCO World Heritage Site
- Official name: Historic Centre of Santa Cruz de Mompox
- Criteria: Cultural: (iv)(v)
- Reference: 742
- Inscription: 1995 (19th Session)

Mompox, officially Santa Cruz de Mompós, is a town and municipality in northern Colombia, in the Bolívar Department. The town initially grew from its proximity to the Magdalena River and has preserved much of its colonial character. It also played an important role in the independence of America from Spain. Today, Mompox depends upon tourism, fishing, and some commerce generated by the local cattle raising. The municipality has a population of 46,408 and is adjacent to the municipalities of Pinillos and San Fernando. The historic center of Mompox was made a UNESCO World Heritage Site in 1995, owing to its preserved colonial architecture and mixture of architectural styles.

== History ==
Mampo (or Mompoj) was the local indigenous chieftain (cacique) of the Malibu culture, when the Spanish conquistadors arrived, and Mompox means "land of the ruler Mampo". The city was founded on May 3, 1537, by Alonso de Heredia, brother of Pedro de Heredia, as a safe port on the Magdalena. Santa Cruz de Mompox became quite prosperous as a port for the transportation of goods upriver into the interior. A royal mint was established here and the town was known for its goldsmiths. On August 6, 1810, it was the first town in Colombia to declare its independence from Spain under the motto, "Be free or die" (Ser libres o morir). The flag of Mompox, which is red with a white cross in the center, dates back to this time in 1810.

If to Caracas I owe my life, then to Mompox I owe my glory.

— Simon Bolivar

Simon Bolivar first arrived in Mompox in 1812. He recruited 400 men to join his army to fight in his Admirable Campaign. The history of his time in Mompox is commemorated with a monument called Piedra de Bolivar.

The popularity of Mompox as a port along the Magdalena River began dwindling in the early 20th century due to the accumulation of sediment. During this time, passage through the branch of the river via Magangué was favored instead.

The 1987 film adaptation of Gabriel García Márquez's Chronicle of a Death Foretold was partly shot in Mompox.

UNESCO named the historic center of Mompox as a World Heritage Site in 1995. The Colombian government named Mompox a Pueblo Patrimonio (heritage town) in 2010. It was among only 11 municipalities nationwide that were selected to be part of the Red Turística de Pueblos Patrimonio original cohort.

== Buildings and architecture ==
Santa Cruz de Mompox is known for the preservation of its colonial architectural features, as expressed by the mixture of its Spanish and indigenous styles. Today, most of the colonial buildings are still used for their original purposes. Of particular note is the wrought ironwork decorating doors, railings, and window grills along the streets, notably on Calle de la Albarrada, Calle Real del Medio, and Calle de Atrás. Notable churches include Santa Bárbara (built 1613), San Agustín (built 1606), San Juan de Dios, and Immaculate Conception. There is also a museum of colonial art that houses religious gold colonial masterpieces.

- San Juan de Dios Hospital was founded in 1550. In 1663 La Orden de todos los Hermanos Hospitalarios (The Knights Hospitaller) took over its management. It depended on the donations of the powerful families in the region and the royal tax charged on shipping along the Magdalena River for its maintenance and operation. San Juan de Dios is considered to be the oldest hospital in America still functioning in its original building.
- City Hall contained the colonial dungeons and the mayor's reception room. It was here that on August 6, 1810, the Act of Independence from Spain was signed, and the cry "Ser Libres o Morir" ("Freedom or Death") was first heard.
- The Municipal Palace, also known as the Cloister of San Carlos, was built in 1660. This cloister housed the city's first secondary school until the Jesuits were driven out. It ceased to be a convent in 1767. Here in 1809 the Universal School of Saint Peter the Apostle was founded by Pedro Martínez de Pinillos.
- The Church of the Immaculate Conception was originally built of adobe by Pedro de Heredia in 1541. Ten years later it was enlarged and masonry replaced much of the adobe, and the straw roof was replaced with tile. Because of its large size, it was often regarded as the cathedral of Mompox. Over the years, the original building was restored several times, with the last restoration completed in 1795. In 1839 the Governor of the Province ordered its demolition and the present church was built on the site.

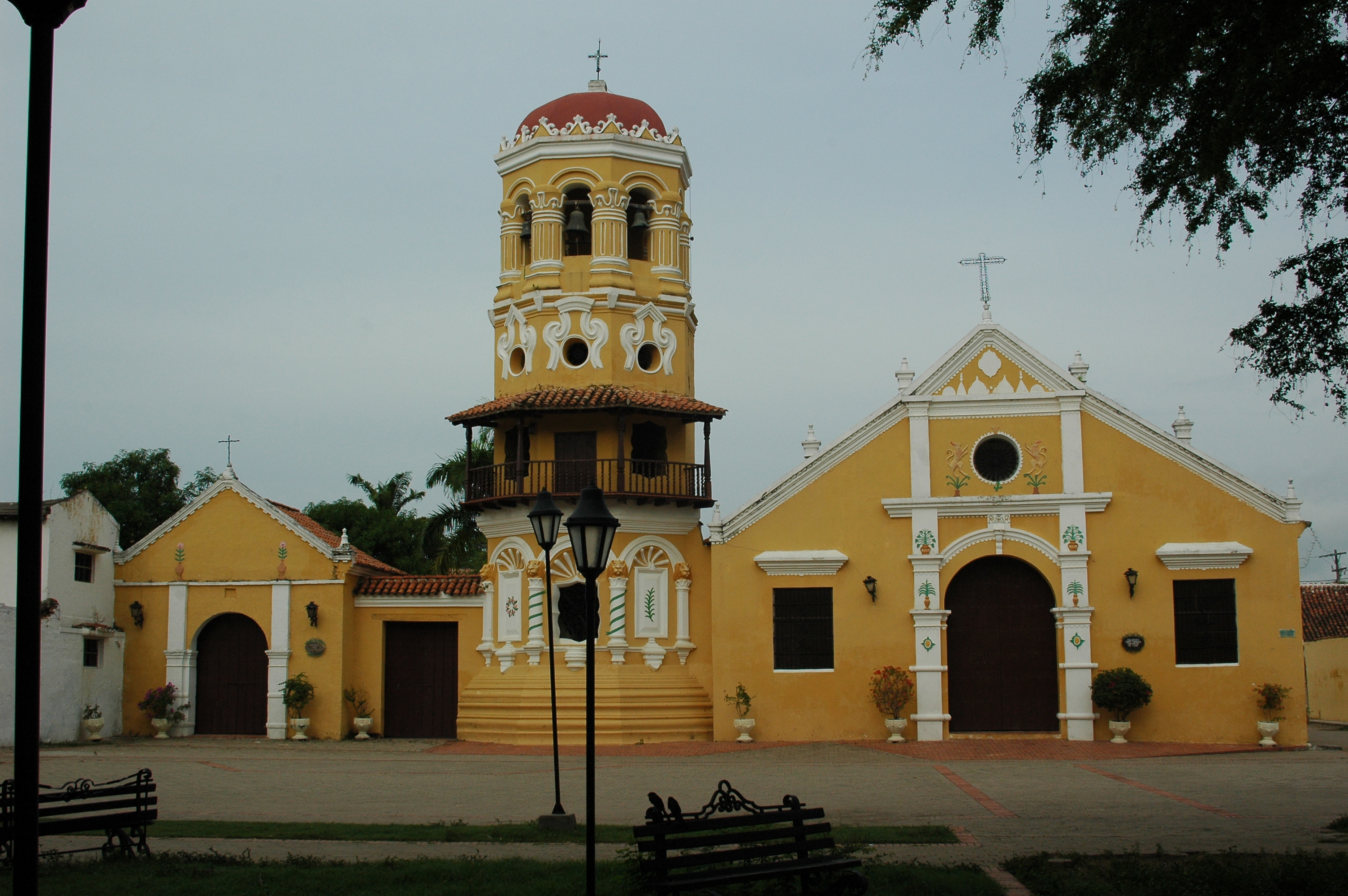
Santa Barbara Church

- The Santa Bárbara Church is one of the best-known and most important churches in the city. Completed in 1613, the church has a baroque bell tower with a balcony. It is decorated with moldings of palm trees, flowers, and lions. The tower's dome is equally baroque, and the church's three altars are heavily gilded.
- The Mompox farmer's market was built at the turn of the 20th century as a way to organize vendors of fruits, vegetables, meats, fish, and other kinds of merchandise who until then would simply claim a spot in the street. The building visually disrupts the landscape between the Church of the Immaculate Conception and the Magdalena river. Thus, the building represents a modification of the original design of the town square.

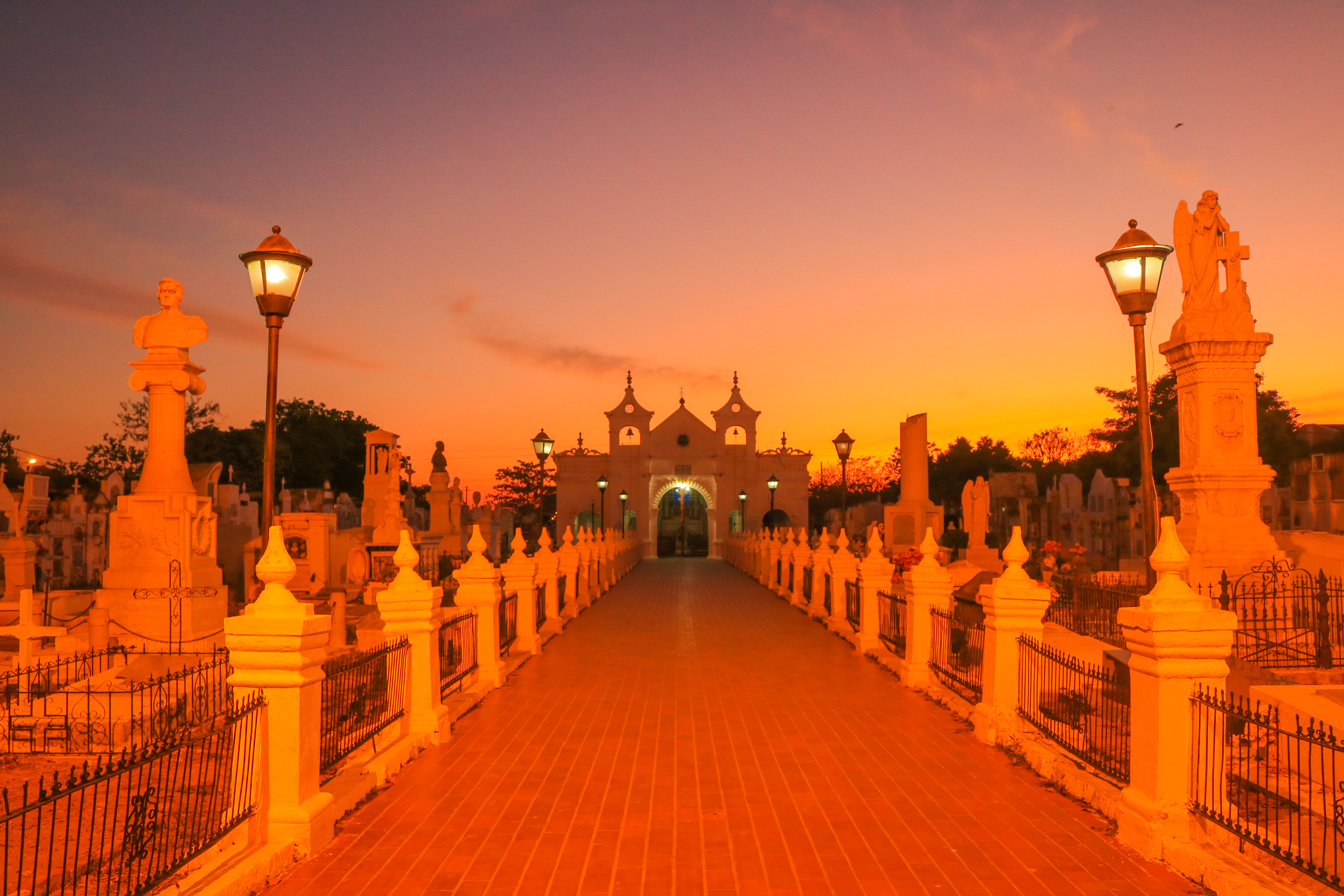
Mompox Cemetery

- The Cemetery's construction in 1829. The chapel and altar were built in 1846. Before this, it was common in colonial times to bury the dead in secluded spaces inside churches, which led to complaints from the population.
- The San Francisco Church was originally built in 1564 and the convent was founded in 1580 by Fray Francisco Gonzaga.
- The House of the Apostles located on Calle Real del Medio was the mansion of a local shipping family and is visited by tourists to see the images of the twelve apostles and of Jesus at the Last Supper.

== Tourism ==
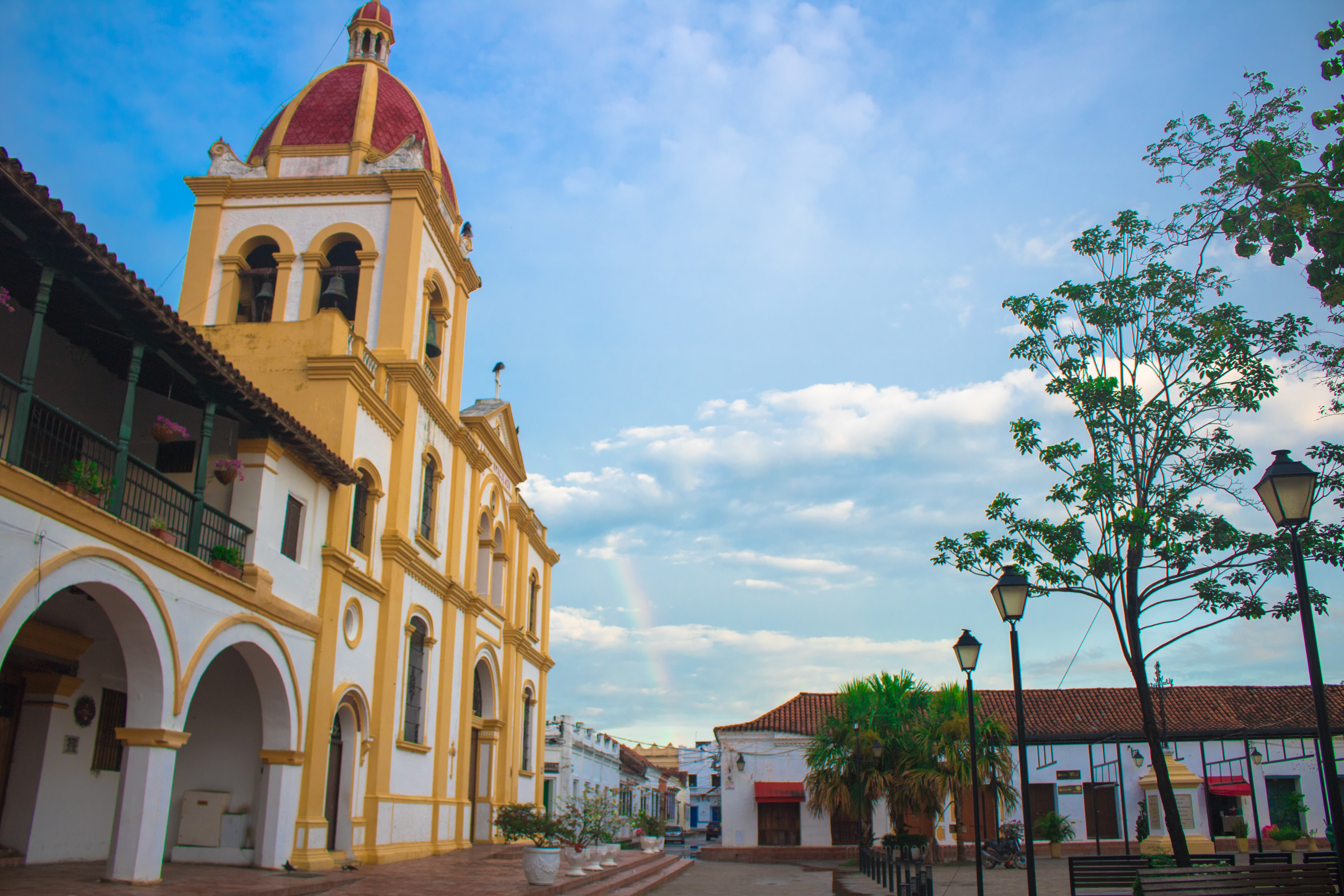
Mompox Streets

Mompox has been a popular tourist destination for its history, colonial architecture, and festivals. Each year, the town hosts the Mompox Jazz Festival as well as film festivals.

Tourism is also common during Holy Week celebrations, which start on Palm Sunday with a flower and candles parade to honor the dead followed by various other ceremonies associated with diverse religious events. All this, as well as its complex of ecclesiastical locales make Mompox a popular destination for religious tourism in Colombia.

=== Food ===
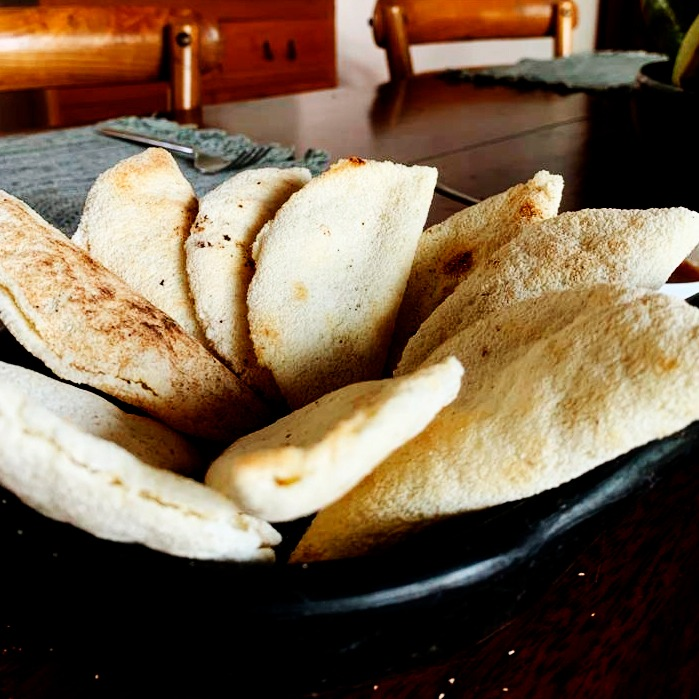
Casabito

Another reason to visit Mompox is its gastronomy, featuring a myriad of dishes based on cassava, corn, fish, achiote, and chili pepper. A local food is the casabito, a ubiquitous street dish consisting of an omelet prepared with raw cassava, cheese, ground coconut, sugar, and, in some cases, anise. Another renowned delicacy is the queso de capa: a type of cheese with over 100 years of artisanal production and tradition, it features an elastic texture and is served in layers.

Juice from the corozo berry is commonly found in this region. It is also used to make wine.

== Filigree ==
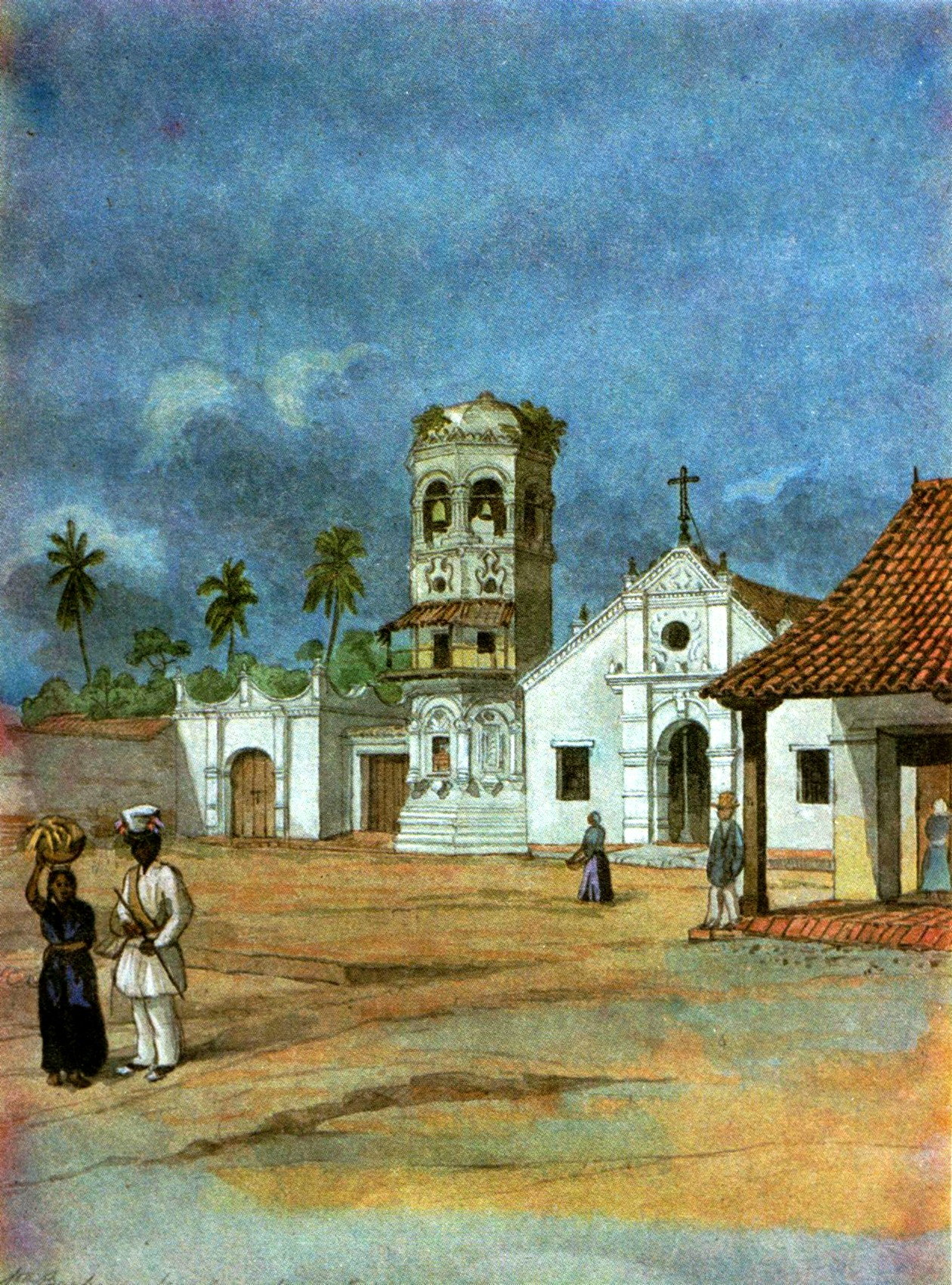
Iglesia de Santa Bárbara in 1845, by Edward Walhouse Mark

A few artisan guilds took hold in Mompox during the 16th century, including clay workers, blacksmiths, goldsmiths, and silversmiths. At the same time, the port was an important trade center for gold extracted in Antioquia, which left behind numerous pieces of the precious metal for local commercialization.

These two factors converged on the dissemination of the filigree craft.

The indigenous casting technique, which is at the heart of the craft of the local goldsmiths, was combined with the ancestral techniques brought by African slaves, thus giving birth to Mompox filigree. This form of art is defined by the union of different thin threads of metal which are then intertwined to create different kinds of ornaments with spirals as the most predominant shapes.

Due to current elevated gold prices in both local and international markets, artisans have developed techniques to replace gold with silver.

== Transportation ==
- By air: The District of Mompox is served by San Bernardo Airport.
- By land: Starting from Carmen de Bolívar, a bus can be taken at the Transversal de los Contenedores (known today as Ruta del Sol III) that will detour at the La Gloria, Magdalena township, passing also through Santa Ana and Talaiga Nuevo before reaching the urban center at the city of Mompox.

Across the Reconciliación bridge, a mega-structure that extends for about 12 kilometers (7.4 miles) over the Magdalena River inaugurated on 30 March 2020. The Yati-Bodega segment connects the western and Magdalena Medio highways, both of which are part of the Ruta del Sol. This segment reduces travel time between the inner country and the Colombian Caribbean coast by approximately three hours, and touches the economy of both Mompox and La Mojana.

The structure comprises the Santa Lucia and Roncador bridges, the Isla Grande highway, a road to connect the Roncador and Bodega bridges, and maintenance between the Yatí pathway and Santa Fe.

- By water: The main waterway to access the District of Mompóx is the Mompóx tributary of the Magdalena River. Mompox has a river terminal linked to the old river port that welcomes vessels from Magangué, El Banco, Santa Ana, and Barrancabermeja.

== Notable people ==
- Totó la Momposina
- Candelario Obeso
