= Buenaventura, Valle del Cauca =

Buenaventura
- Municipality and city
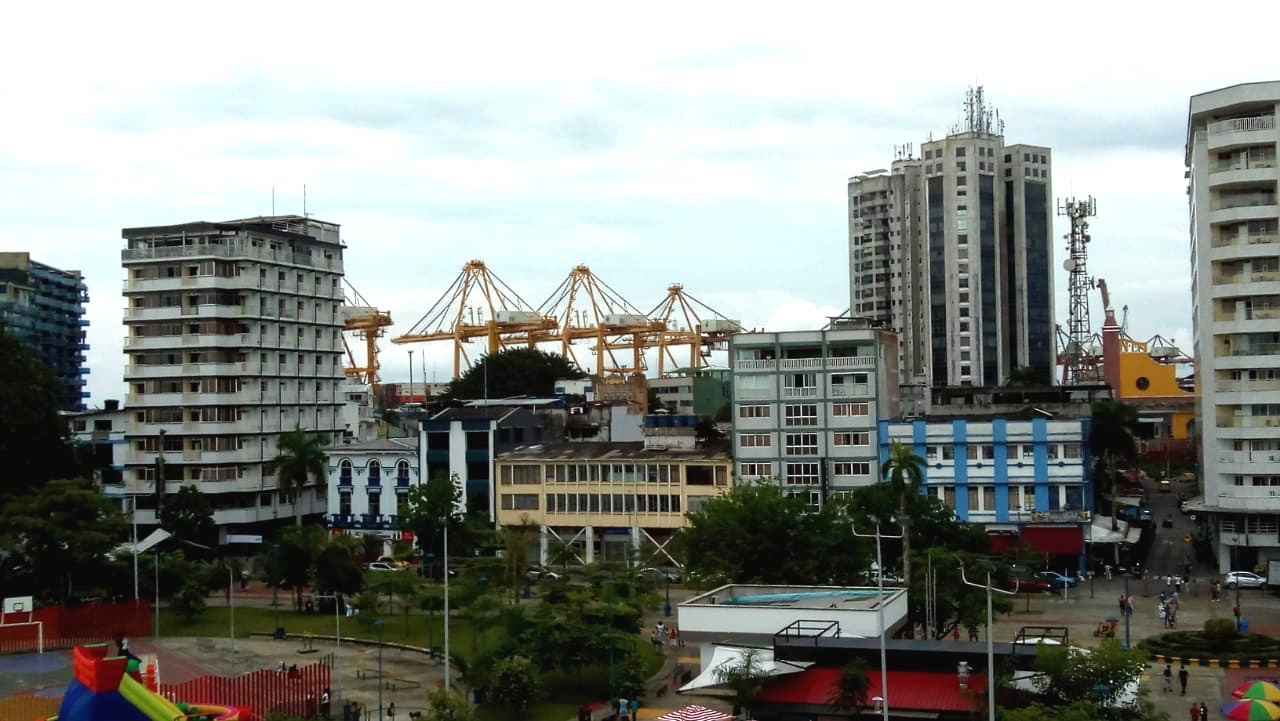
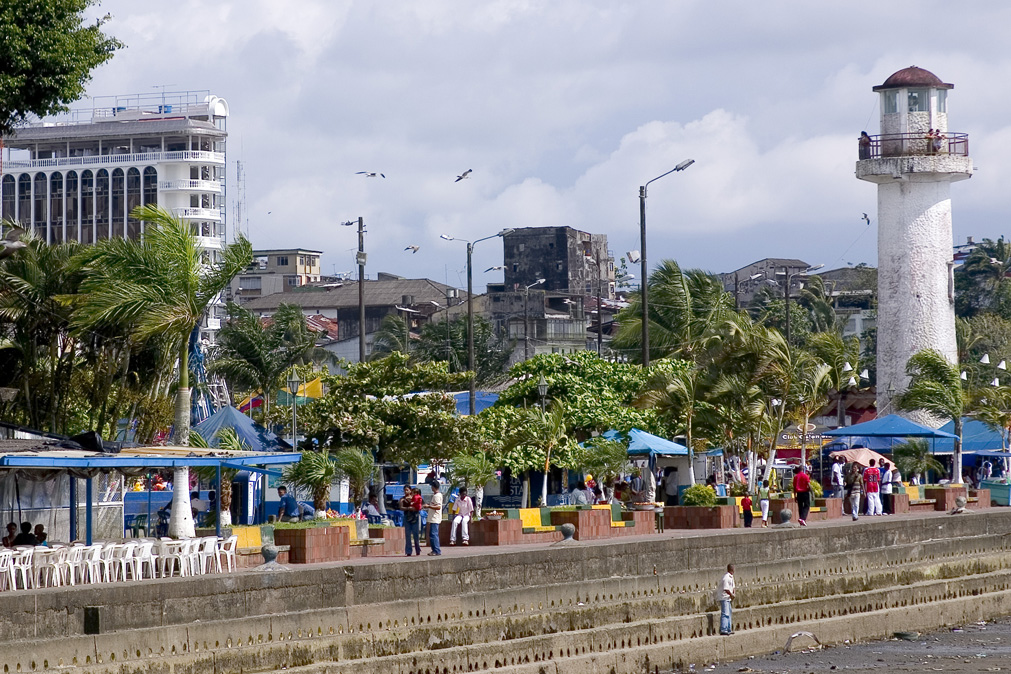
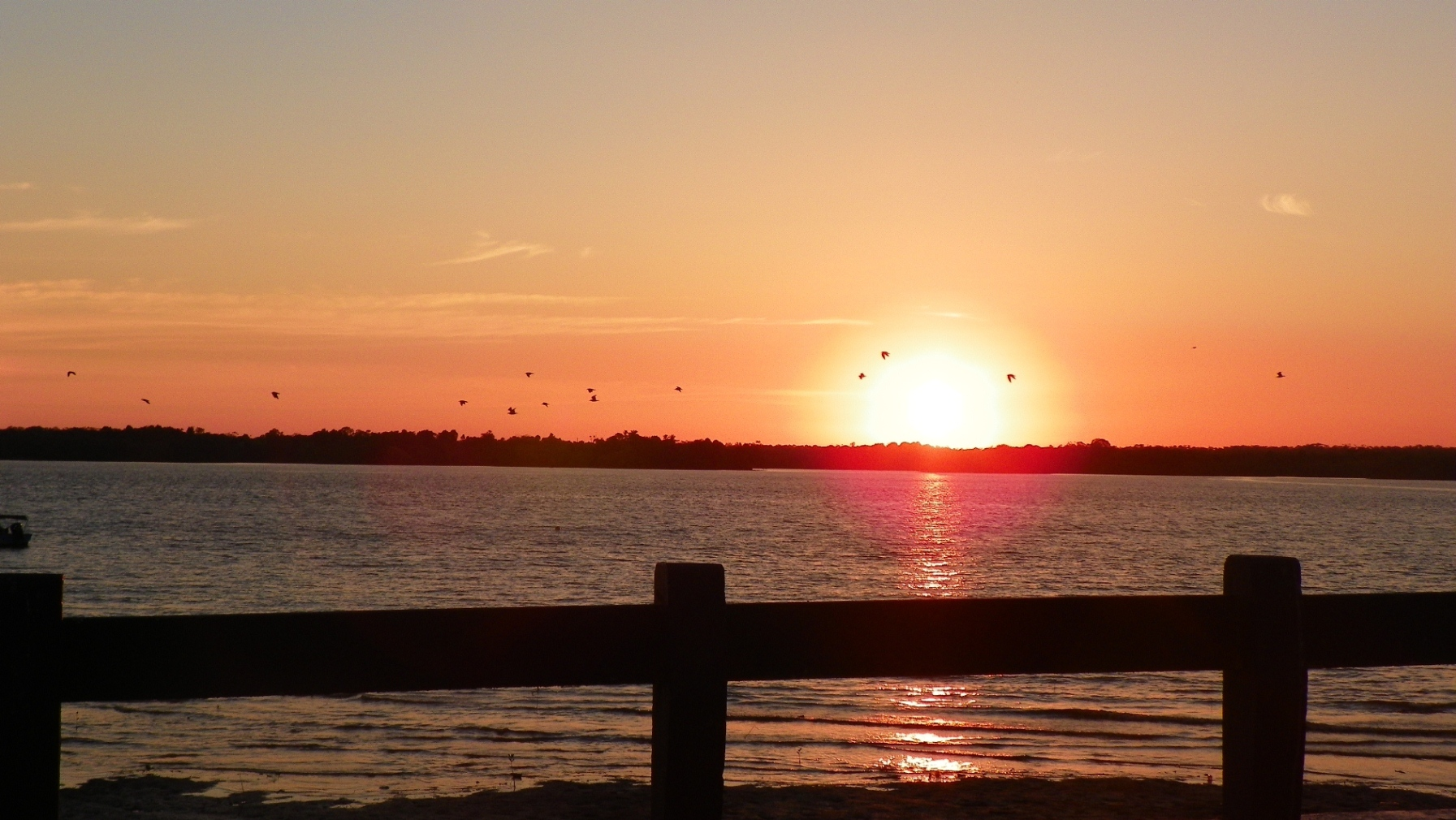
- Downtown, Park and main jetty and Sunset in Buenaventura

- Flag Coat of arms
- Nickname: El Puerto (the Port)
- Location of the municipality and town of Buenaventura, Colombia in the Valle del Cauca Department of Colombia.

- Location in Colombia Buenaventura (Colombia)
- Coordinates: 3°52′38″N 77°1′36″W
- Country: Colombia
- Department: Valle del Cauca Department
- Region: Pacific Region of Colombia
- Regional District: Special economic zone district
- Foundation: 14 July 1540
- Founder: Juan Ladrillero by order from Pascual de Andagoya

Government
  - Mayor: Ligia del Carmen Córdoba Martínez
  - City Council: List of Councillors: Hernan Sinisterra Valencia (Partido Liberal Colombiano); Ricardo Grueso Mena (Movimiento de Inclusión y Oportunidades); Edwin James Patiño Minotta (Movimiento de Inclusión y Oportunidades); Maria Yovana Rodriguez Garcia (Partido de Integración Nacional); Ligia del Carmen Cordoba (Partido de la U); Noris del Carmen Cano de Paz (Partido de Integración Nacional); Timoteo Ruiz Manyoma (Partido Conservador Colombiano); Wistong Segura Valencia (Partido de Integración Nacional); Jaidy Maria Alzamora Barrios (Partido Cambio Radical); Jaime Andres Olaya Rivera (Partido Conservador Colombiano); Julio Cesar Sanchez Cardona (Partido Conservador Colombiano); Jorge Alonso Moreno Mosquera (Partido Cambio Radical); Hernando Vente Amu (Movimiento de Inclusión y Oportunidades); Stalin Ortiz Gutierrez (Partido Liberal Colombiano); Yiliber Garces Gongora (Partido Liberal Colombiano); Segundo Edgar Angulo V. (Partido Cambio Radical); Evangelista Arango Cuero (Partido de la U); Victor Hugo Vidal Piedrahita (Polo Democrático Alternativo); Jair Hurtado Salcedo (Autoridades Indígenas de Colombia)

Area
  - Municipality and city: 6,292 km^{2} (2,429 sq mi)
  - Urban: 33 km^{2} (13 sq mi)
- Highest elevation: 7 m (23 ft)
- Lowest elevation: 0 m (0 ft)

Population (2020 estimate)
  - Municipality and city: 311,827
  - Rank: Ranked 19th
  - Density: 49.56/km^{2} (128.4/sq mi)
  - Urban: 238,648
  - Urban density: 7,200/km^{2} (19,000/sq mi)
- Demonym(s): Porteño, Bonaverense
- Time zone: UTC-5 (Colombia Standard Time)
- Area code: 224
- Website: www.buenaventura.gov.co

Buenaventura is a coastal seaport city located in the Pacific Region of the department of Valle del Cauca, Colombia (South America). Buenaventura (Spanish for "good fortune") is the main port of Colombia in the Pacific Ocean.

As of the 2018 census, Buenaventura has a population of 235,064. Most of the urban development takes place on Cascajal Island, while the majority of the city's land is rural with scattered, small villages. It is served by the Gerardo Tobar López Airport.

The city is part of the UNESCO Creative Cities Network after it was named a "City of Gastronomy" in 2017.

== History ==
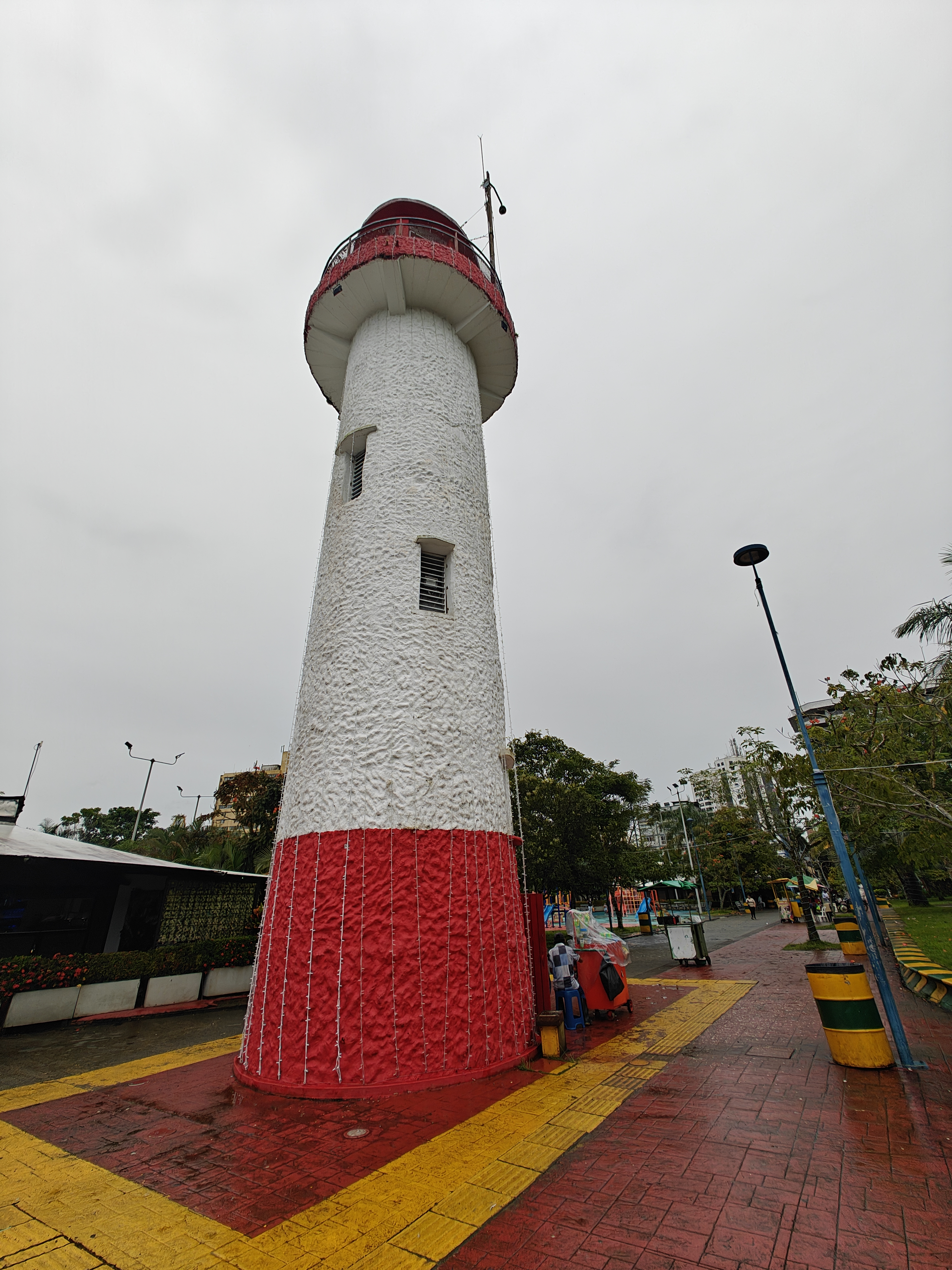
El Faro, the city landmark

The city was founded on July 14, 1540, by Juan Ladrillero through orders from Pascual de Andagoya. Its name, Buenaventura, is Spanish for "good luck". At that time, it was inhabited by an indigenous tribe called the Buscaja Indians.

The city was destroyed by Indigenous Americans before 1600; it was later rebuilt. Buenaventura thrived after the opening of the Panama Canal in 1914; and in the 1950s became a regular stopover for the 'international jet set'. Today, the city is crucial for sending raw materials to nearby areas; this has brought prosperity and allowed recent new development to occur.

== Demographics ==
=== Ethnic Composition ===
According to the 2018 DANE census, its demographic composition is as follows:

Afro-Colombian: 220,318 (85.25%)

Whites and Mestizos: 29,825 (11.54%)

No response: 4,289 (1.66%)

Indigenous: 3,919 (1.52%)

Raizal: 48 (0.02%)

Palenquero: 33 (0.01%)

Romani: 13 (0.01%)

There are ten indigenous reservations fully or partly within Buenaventura. They belong to Emberá people, specifically to Waunana and Chami sub-tribes.

== Transport ==
=== Port ===
The city is one of the major ports on the continent, accounting for nearly 60% of all Colombian sea imports and exports. However, due to its strategic position, the city's economy has been hampered by gang-related activity fighting over control of the port, making it among the most impoverished cities in Colombia.

=== Rivers ===
The city is surrounded by rivers, including: the Dagua; the Anchicayá; the Calima; the Raposo; the Mayorquín; the Cajambre; the Yurumanguí; and part of the right arm of the Naya River and part of the left arm of the River San Juan at its mouth. In addition, it has many streams and smaller rivers, such as Agua Clara, San Marcos, Sabaletas, San Cipriano and Escalerete, which supplies the municipal capital through an aqueduct.

=== Road ===
Well paved and maintained roads, that are designed to be unaffected by landslides, leave the city via Loboguerrero, where it divides to go to Cali, or Buga and then onwards to the cities of Armenia, Medellín and Bogotá. This route is known as "La Vía al Mar", as it connects the parts of the country together.

=== Airport ===
Gerardo Tobar López Airport connects Buenaventura with direct flights to Dorado Airport of 1 hour 20 minutes to Bogotá via Satena, as well as to other cities.

== Crime ==
Buenaventura has had a notorious history plagued by the Colombian armed conflict, drug trafficking, violence, and the presence of guerrilla and paramilitary groups.

Colombian authorities have seized almost US$28 million in cash from drug kingpins. The money found was in several shipping containers sent from Manzanillo, Colima (Mexico) and Houston (United States), that belonged to brothers Luis Enrique and Javier Antonio Calle Serna, also known as the 'Combas'.

Between 2008 and 2010, the number of reported homicides in the city doubled. In 2010, the murder rate of Buenaventura was 175.2 homicides per 100,000, a rate 5 times the national average. To counter the violence, the Colombian government has set up a marine special forces unit in the worst area of the city. In 2011, it seemed that counter-violence efforts had improved crime metrics, even while aspects of the Colombian drug war in that city worsened. According to community activist Victor Hugo Vidal, "If you ask the authorities, they will tell you [the city] is better – that the homicide rates are way down. But for us [living here], during the last 10 years, there has been no change."

== Education ==
=== Universities ===
The city hosts higher education universities, both private and public:

==== Public ====
- Universidad del Valle is the leading academic institution in south-western Colombia, with the third-highest student population in the country. Its main campus is in the city of Cali, but apart from the capital of Valle del Cauca, there are campuses in Barrio San Fernando, where the Faculty of Health and the Faculty of Administration are based, and they have regional headquarters in: Buga, Cartago, Caicedonia, Northern Cauca, Buenaventura, Palmira, Tulua, Yumbo and Zarzal. In has a total of 30,000 students (2007) of which almost 25,000 are undergraduates and 5,000 postgraduates. The headquarters of the Universidad del Valle in the city of Buenaventura, are on the Avenida Simon Bolivar km 9 Contiguo ITI College, GVC.
- Universidad del Pacífico – is a University Public Institution of Higher Education. It has five academic programs; Systems Engineering, Architecture, Sociology, Humid Tropics Agriculture, Aquaculture Technology, and Computer Technology. The administrative office is located at Avenida Simon Bolivar # 54A-10 in Buenaventura. It also has offices in Guapi and Tumaco.
- Universidad del Quindío

==== Private ====
- Universidad Antonio Nariño is one of the largest private universities in the country, with campuses in nearly all major cities in Colombia, including Buenaventura

== Geography ==
Buenaventura is located a few kilometers from the western cordillera of the Andes mountain range and about 116 kilometres (72.1 mi) by road from the major city of Cali, the department's capital. It is one of the rainiest cities in the world, with 6,000 to 7,000 millimetres (240 to 280 in) of rainfall annually.

=== Climate ===
Buenaventura, like all of the Colombia Pacific Coast, has an extremely consistent, wet, cloudy, humid and hot tropical rainforest climate (Köppen Af).

Climate data for Buenaventura (Gerardo Tobar López Airport), elevation 14 m (46 ft), (1981–2010)
Month	Jan	Feb	Mar	Apr	May	Jun	Jul	Aug	Sep	Oct	Nov	Dec	Year
Mean daily maximum °C (°F)	29.6 (85.3)	30.6 (87.1)	30.9 (87.6)	31.1 (88.0)	30.9 (87.6)	30.4 (86.7)	30.3 (86.5)	30.4 (86.7)	30.2 (86.4)	30.0 (86.0)	29.6 (85.3)	29.6 (85.3)	30.3 (86.5)
Daily mean °C (°F)	25.8 (78.4)	26.1 (79.0)	26.4 (79.5)	26.4 (79.5)	26.3 (79.3)	26.0 (78.8)	25.9 (78.6)	26.0 (78.8)	25.9 (78.6)	25.7 (78.3)	25.6 (78.1)	25.7 (78.3)	26.0 (78.8)
Mean daily minimum °C (°F)	22.9 (73.2)	23.1 (73.6)	23.1 (73.6)	23.1 (73.6)	22.9 (73.2)	22.7 (72.9)	22.7 (72.9)	22.7 (72.9)	22.7 (72.9)	22.6 (72.7)	22.7 (72.9)	22.7 (72.9)	22.8 (73.0)
Average precipitation mm (inches)	413.9 (16.30)	290.9 (11.45)	392.7 (15.46)	530.2 (20.87)	618.9 (24.37)	533.3 (21.00)	578.3 (22.77)	666.2 (26.23)	781.2 (30.76)	807.3 (31.78)	713.9 (28.11)	571.4 (22.50)	6,898.2 (271.58)
Average precipitation days	22	18	21	23	25	26	26	26	26	26	24	23	282
Average relative humidity (%)	89	88	88	88	89	88	89	89	89	89	89	89	89
Mean monthly sunshine hours	86.8	87.5	96.1	105.0	99.2	99.0	114.7	124.0	93.0	99.2	87.0	86.8	1,178.3
Mean daily sunshine hours	2.8	3.1	3.1	3.5	3.2	3.3	3.7	4.0	3.1	3.2	2.9	2.8	3.2
Source: Instituto de Hidrologia Meteorologia y Estudios Ambientales

Climate data for Buenaventura Port (Colpuertos), elevation 10 m (33 ft), (1981–2010)
Month	Jan	Feb	Mar	Apr	May	Jun	Jul	Aug	Sep	Oct	Nov	Dec	Year
Mean daily maximum °C (°F)	29.7 (85.5)	30.3 (86.5)	30.4 (86.7)	30.4 (86.7)	30.3 (86.5)	29.9 (85.8)	29.8 (85.6)	29.8 (85.6)	29.7 (85.5)	29.3 (84.7)	29.2 (84.6)	29.3 (84.7)	29.8 (85.6)
Daily mean °C (°F)	26.2 (79.2)	26.6 (79.9)	26.7 (80.1)	26.7 (80.1)	26.6 (79.9)	26.3 (79.3)	26.3 (79.3)	26.2 (79.2)	26.0 (78.8)	25.9 (78.6)	25.9 (78.6)	26.1 (79.0)	26.3 (79.3)
Mean daily minimum °C (°F)	23.7 (74.7)	23.9 (75.0)	24.1 (75.4)	23.8 (74.8)	23.8 (74.8)	23.6 (74.5)	23.5 (74.3)	23.5 (74.3)	23.3 (73.9)	23.3 (73.9)	23.4 (74.1)	23.5 (74.3)	23.6 (74.5)
Average precipitation mm (inches)	410.4 (16.16)	307.1 (12.09)	384.5 (15.14)	552.1 (21.74)	667.0 (26.26)	581.9 (22.91)	685.2 (26.98)	818.6 (32.23)	911.3 (35.88)	881.5 (34.70)	788.0 (31.02)	653.2 (25.72)	7,609 (299.6)
Average precipitation days	25	21	21	25	27	27	27	28	28	29	26	26	306
Average relative humidity (%)	88	87	86	87	88	88	88	88	89	89	89	88	88
Source: Instituto de Hidrologia Meteorologia y Estudios Ambientales

== Tourism ==
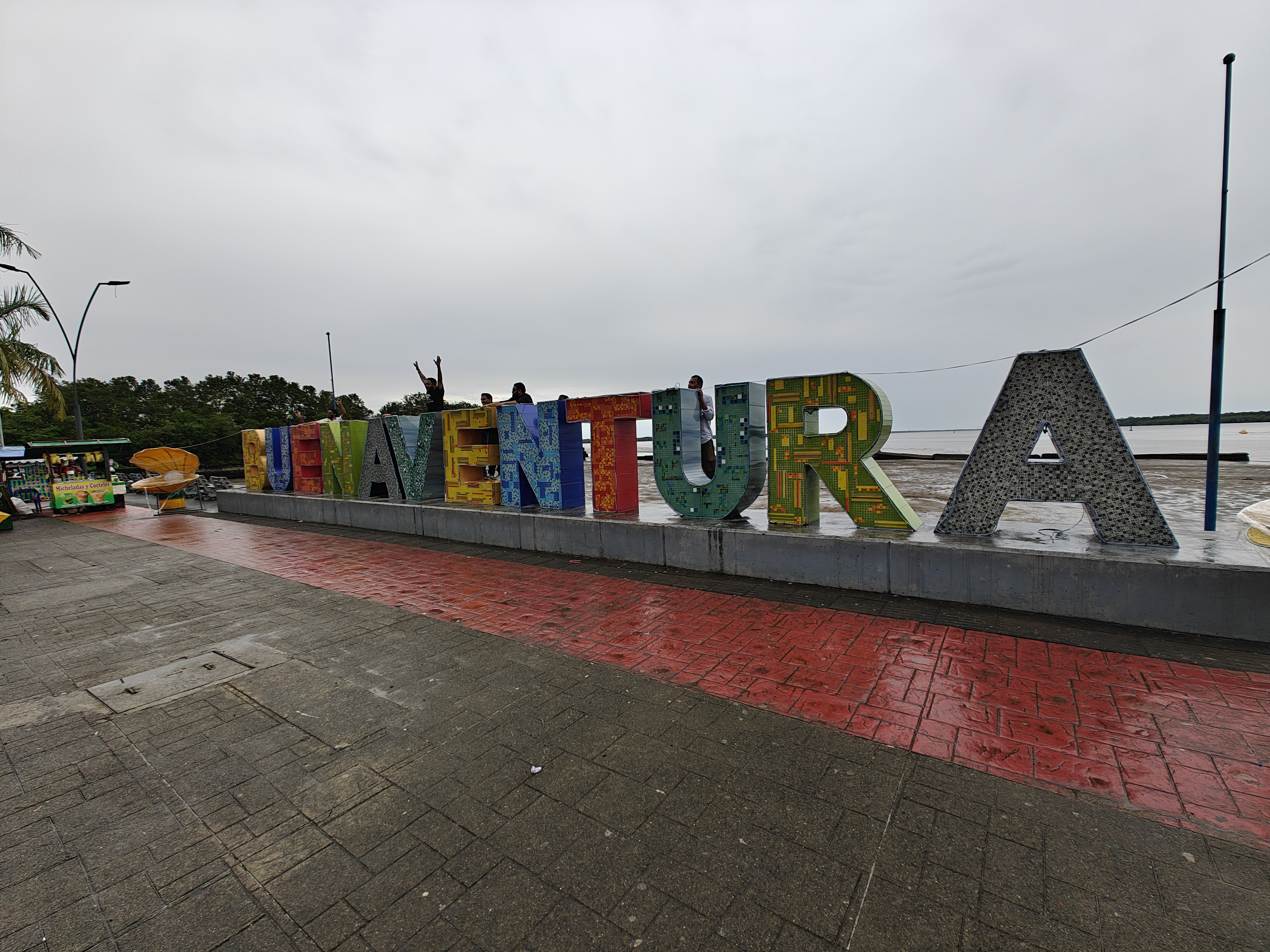

The most notable tourist venue is the Cascajal Island located in the western part of the city. It is inhabited, and is surrounded by marshes and in it are important tourist and commercial sites including Néstor Urbano Tenorio park, the field of handicrafts sea of the same, the cathedral San Buenaventura Hotel Station, the ramp or site boats to go to nearby islands and the pier.

Piangüita, a coastal town near Buenaventura, has the Ecoparque Theme Green Iguanas, created by Rigoberto Gomez. The Ecopark comprises four hectares, and is part of the homelands of the black community of Bazán. It also has beaches which attract tourists.

Bahía Málaga is a deepwater port designed to provide support to large ships that cannot enter the port of Buenaventura.

=== Places of interest ===
- Cathedral of Buenaventura
- National Palace
- San Cipriano and Escalarete rivers Nature Reserve.
- Beaches of La Bocana, Piangüita, Juanchaco, Ladrilleros and La Barra
- Hotel Maguipi
- Botanical Garden Bushes, within the area of Bahía Málaga Uramba National Natural Park

=== Other places of interest ===
- Néstor Urbano Tenorio Park
- Tourist floating dock.
- Mural "Buenaventura 450 years in space"
- Spa on the outskirts of the city
- Hotel Station

== Notable natives and residents ==
- Petronio Álvarez, musician and songwriter
- Juan Carlos Candelo, former NABF Light Middleweight champion
- Raul Cuero, professor of microbiology at Prairie View A&M University and Inventor
- Bladimir Díaz, footballer
- Margarita Diez-Colunje y Pombo (1838–1919), historian, translator, genealogist
- Marbelle, pop singer
- Edison Miranda, a 2000 Colombia Olympian, former WBO Latino, NABA, and IBF Latino Middleweight champion
- Fernando Montaño, soloist with the Royal Ballet in London
- Peregoyo, musician and songwriter
- Freddy Rincón, retired Colombian football midfielder
- Adolfo Valencia, retired Colombian football striker
- Bartolo Valencia Ramos, former Mayor

== Sport ==
The city has had two professional football teams; each club played Categoría Primera B and had only a short existence. Pacífico F.C. only existed for the 2010–2011 season, whereas Atlético Buenaventura played between 1991 and 1995.
