= Arauca =

Arauca can refer to:

- Arauca Department, in the northeastern part of Colombia
- Arauca, Arauca, capital of the Arauca Department in Colombia
- Arauca River, a river shared by Colombia and Venezuela
