= Petronio Álvarez =

Colombian musician and songwriter (1914–1966)

- Also known as: The King of Currulao
- Born: Patricio Romano Petronio Álvarez Quintero; 1 October 1914; Buenaventura, Colombia
- Died: 10 December 1966 (aged 52) Cali, Colombia

Patricio Romano Petronio Álvarez Quintero (Note: In this Spanish name, the first or paternal surname is Álvarez and the second or maternal family name is Quintero.) (1914–1966), known as Petronio Álvarez, was a Colombian musician and songwriter. He is known as the King of Currulao, and his song "Mi Buenaventura" has been called an anthem of the city of Buenaventura. The Petronio Álvarez Festival, held annually in Cali since 1997, was named in his honour.

== Early life and railway career ==
Patricio Romano Petronio Álvarez Quintero was born on 1 October 1914 in Buenaventura, in the Colombian department of Valle del Cauca. His mother Juana Francisca Quintero Asprilla was a flautist and poet from Chocó, and his father José Joaquín Álvarez Micolta was a train driver and guitarist from Cauca. Álvarez's father died in 1926, at which point he left school and started working. He later got a job at Ferrocarriles Nacionales de Colombia, the state-owned railway company, and was the driver of the locomotive "La Palmera", which is now a monument in a park Cali. Álvarez retired from the railway in 1958, and moved to Cali.

== Music career and legacy ==
In 1931, Álvarez wrote the currulao song "Mi Buenaventura", which El País called "without a doubt his best-known work". El Espectador described "Mi Buenaventura" as "the anthem of Buenaventura and its people." It was first recorded by Tito Cortés and the Trovadores de Barú in 1952, and has since been recorded over 25 times. Álvarez formed a conjunto called Buenaventura in 1935, comprising two guitars, a tiple, and a guasá; they performed on the radio station La Voz del Pacífico.

Álvarez is known as the King of Currulao (Spanish: Rey del Currulao), and his best-known songs are currulaos. He also composed in the styles of bambuco, merengue, huapango, son, abozao, juga, and tango. He was a particular admirer of Argentine songwriter Carlos Gardel. Topics of Álvarez's lyrics include "the macho spirit of the negro porteño", funeral rites and local stories about the dead returning, and patriotic feeling for Buenaventura.

The Petronio Álvarez Festival is a music festival that has been held annually in Cali since 1997, when it was established and named in Álvarez's honour. The festival is particularly focused on the folklore and culture of afro-Colombians from the Colombian Pacific.

== Personal life and death ==
Álvarez met his wife Veneranda in 1942, and they married in 1953. They had 10 children together. He died on 10 December 1966 of bone cancer in Cali.
