= Villagarzón =

Coordinates: 01°01′46″N 76°36′59″W

- Municipality and town
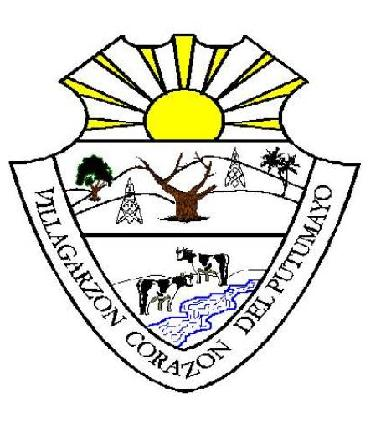
- Flag Coat of arms

- Location of the municipality and town of Villa Garzón in the Putumayo Department of Colombia.

- Location in Colombia
- Country: Colombia
- Department: Putumayo Department

Area
  - Municipality and town: 1,397 km^{2} (539 sq mi)
  - Urban: 2.42 km^{2} (0.93 sq mi)

Population (2018 census)
  - Municipality and town: 23,700
  - Density: 17.0/km^{2} (43.9/sq mi)
  - Urban: 13,742
  - Urban density: 5,680/km^{2} (14,700/sq mi)
- Time zone: UTC-5 (Colombia Standard Time)

Villagarzón is a town and municipality located in the Putumayo Department, Republic of Colombia.

== Climate ==
Villagarzón has a very wet and overcast tropical rainforest climate (Köppen Af).

Climate data for Villagarzón, elevation 440 m (1,440 ft), (1981–2010)
Month	Jan	Feb	Mar	Apr	May	Jun	Jul	Aug	Sep	Oct	Nov	Dec	Year
Mean daily maximum °C (°F)	30.3 (86.5)	30.1 (86.2)	29.0 (84.2)	29.1 (84.4)	28.5 (83.3)	27.4 (81.3)	27.6 (81.7)	28.5 (83.3)	30.1 (86.2)	30.5 (86.9)	30.2 (86.4)	29.9 (85.8)	29.2 (84.6)
Daily mean °C (°F)	24.9 (76.8)	24.8 (76.6)	24.5 (76.1)	24.2 (75.6)	23.9 (75.0)	23.5 (74.3)	23.2 (73.8)	23.7 (74.7)	24.4 (75.9)	24.7 (76.5)	24.6 (76.3)	24.6 (76.3)	24.3 (75.7)
Mean daily minimum °C (°F)	21.0 (69.8)	21.0 (69.8)	21.0 (69.8)	20.4 (68.7)	20.6 (69.1)	20.3 (68.5)	20.0 (68.0)	20.1 (68.2)	20.1 (68.2)	20.6 (69.1)	21.1 (70.0)	20.6 (69.1)	20.6 (69.1)
Average precipitation mm (inches)	331.5 (13.05)	356.8 (14.05)	381.7 (15.03)	522.3 (20.56)	561.4 (22.10)	574.1 (22.60)	491.9 (19.37)	370.7 (14.59)	351.2 (13.83)	354.1 (13.94)	362.7 (14.28)	369.3 (14.54)	5,027.6 (197.94)
Average precipitation days	20	19	24	25	26	26	24	21	20	21	21	23	264
Average relative humidity (%)	86	86	87	87	87	87	86	85	82	83	86	86	86
Mean monthly sunshine hours	105.4	81.9	68.2	75.0	71.3	54.0	71.3	86.8	105.0	114.7	108.0	99.2	1,040.8
Mean daily sunshine hours	3.4	2.9	2.2	2.5	2.3	1.8	2.3	2.8	3.5	3.7	3.6	3.2	2.9
Source: Instituto de Hidrologia Meteorologia y Estudios Ambientales

Climate data for Puerto, Umbria, Villagarzón, elevation 358 m (1,175 ft), (1981–2010)
Month	Jan	Feb	Mar	Apr	May	Jun	Jul	Aug	Sep	Oct	Nov	Dec	Year
Mean daily maximum °C (°F)	31.5 (88.7)	31.4 (88.5)	30.2 (86.4)	30.5 (86.9)	30.0 (86.0)	29.1 (84.4)	29.2 (84.6)	29.7 (85.5)	31.2 (88.2)	31.7 (89.1)	31.3 (88.3)	31.1 (88.0)	30.6 (87.1)
Daily mean °C (°F)	25.5 (77.9)	25.4 (77.7)	25.0 (77.0)	25.0 (77.0)	24.7 (76.5)	24.2 (75.6)	24.0 (75.2)	24.5 (76.1)	25.0 (77.0)	25.3 (77.5)	25.4 (77.7)	25.5 (77.9)	25.0 (77.0)
Mean daily minimum °C (°F)	21.5 (70.7)	21.5 (70.7)	21.3 (70.3)	21.2 (70.2)	21.0 (69.8)	20.7 (69.3)	20.5 (68.9)	20.7 (69.3)	20.6 (69.1)	21.1 (70.0)	21.3 (70.3)	21.3 (70.3)	21.0 (69.8)
Average precipitation mm (inches)	236.2 (9.30)	255.6 (10.06)	375.2 (14.77)	482.0 (18.98)	480.6 (18.92)	442.2 (17.41)	372.4 (14.66)	260.4 (10.25)	308.6 (12.15)	350.8 (13.81)	373.3 (14.70)	332.7 (13.10)	4,150.6 (163.41)
Average precipitation days	15	14	21	22	24	23	21	19	17	19	19	19	228
Average relative humidity (%)	86	86	88	88	89	89	88	86	85	85	86	86	87
Mean monthly sunshine hours	136.4	98.8	86.8	90.0	89.9	81.0	89.9	117.8	126.0	142.6	132.0	139.5	1,330.7
Mean daily sunshine hours	4.4	3.5	2.8	3.0	2.9	2.7	2.9	3.8	4.2	4.6	4.4	4.5	3.6
Source: Instituto de Hidrologia Meteorologia y Estudios Ambientales
