= List of accidents and incidents involving non-commercial flights =

This is a list of accidents and incidents that involve ferry flights, test flights or private flights.

== 1912 ==
- May 13 – A Flanders F.2 with two people on board crashed, killing both people on board. This is the first accident involving general aviation.

== 1921 ==
- August 26 – A SNETA Farman Goliath ditched in the North Sea. The aircraft was recovered and repaired, but the two crew members were missing. The aircraft was on a mail flight.

== 1928 ==
- July 13 – In the 1928 Imperial Airways Vickers Vulcan crash, an Imperial Airways Vickers Vulcan on a test flight from Croydon Airport, England, crashed near Purley, Surrey, 3 miles (4.8 km) from the airport resulting in the deaths of four passengers.

== 1938 ==
- July 24 - A Curtiss Hawk II crashed into a crowd in Campo de Marte, Colombia. The pilot was killed, along with fifty two people on the ground.
- August 24 - A Fokker Super Universal and a Mitsubishi Ki1 collided over Ōmori, Tokyo. The death toll varies; it can be either 40 deaths and 106 injuries or 80 deaths and 78 injuries.

== 1953 ==
- March 12 - A Royal Air Force Avro Lincoln was shot down by a Mikoyan MiG-15 in East Germany. All seven people on board died.

== 1959 ==
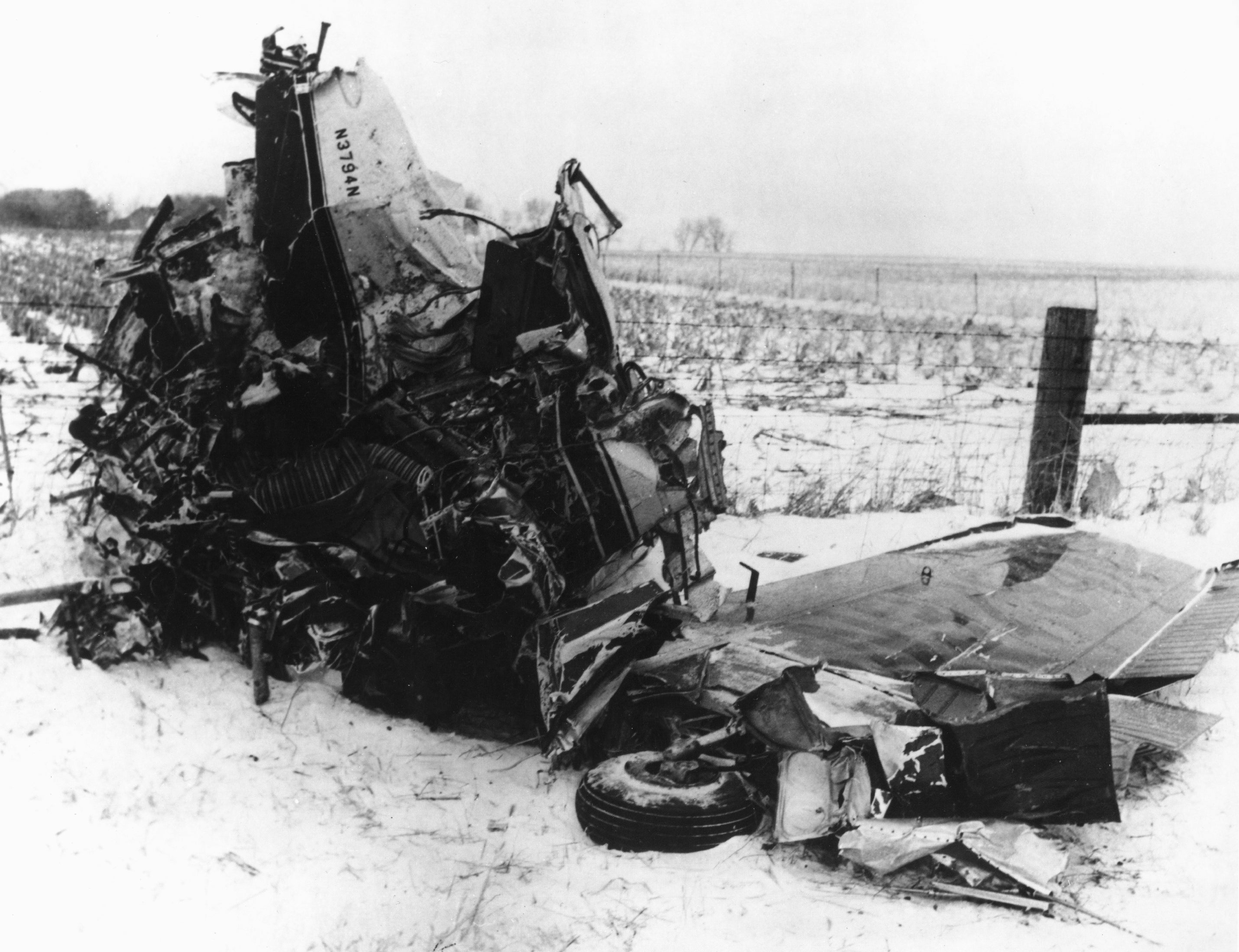
Wreckage of the 1959 Clear Lake Beechcraft Bonanza crash

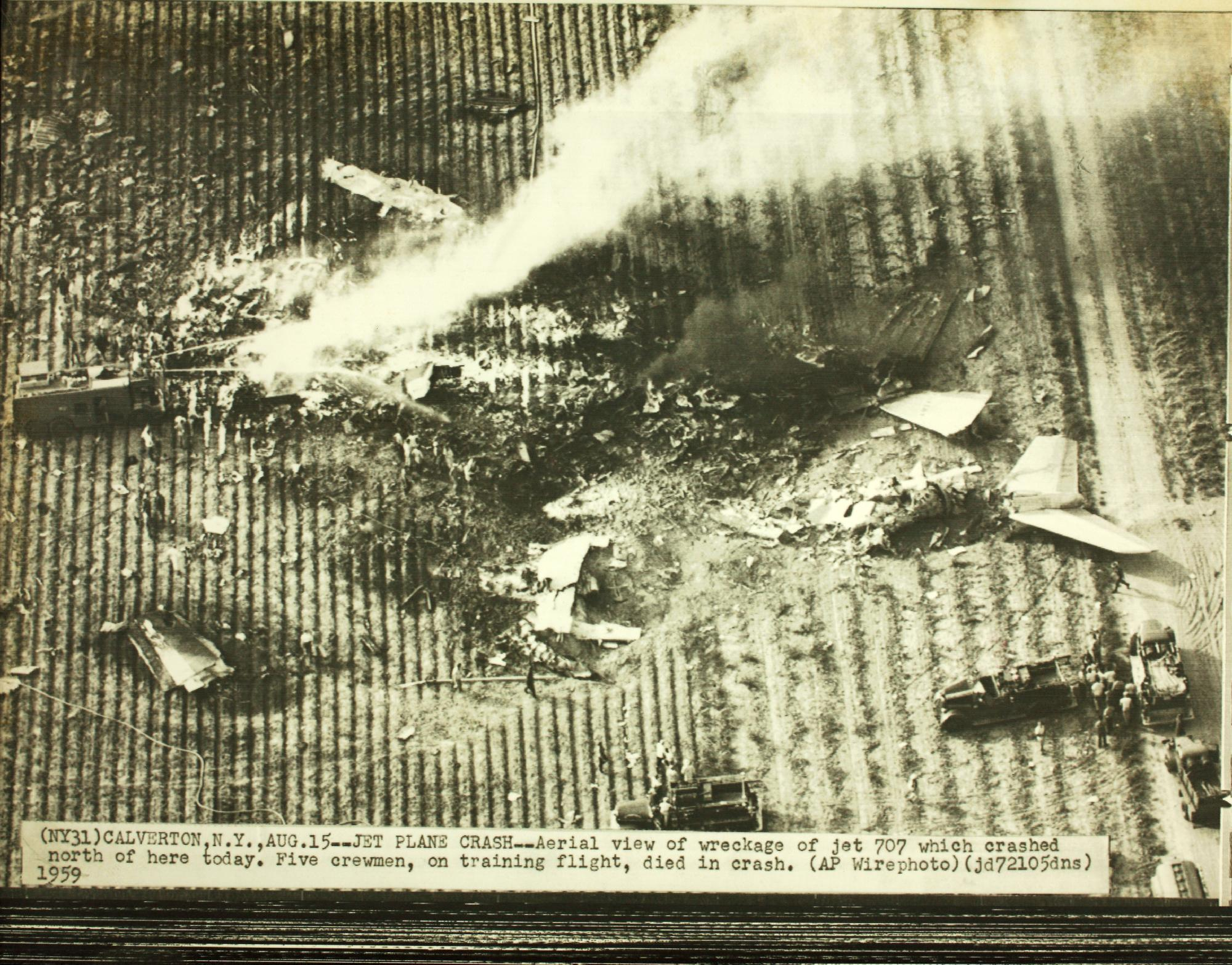
The wreckage of American Airlines Flight 514

- February 3 - In the 1959 Clear Lake Beechcraft Bonanza crash, a Beechcraft Bonanza crashed in Iowa. Buddy Holly, Ritchie Valens and The Big Bopper died.
- August 15 – American Airlines Flight 514, a Boeing 707 crashed near Calverton-Peconic River Airport, New York after a loss of control. All five crew members are killed in the first crash involving a Boeing 707.
- October 13 - A Boeing 707 crashes in Washington after three engines detach due to extreme aerodynamic maneuvers by the crew leading to a loss of control, killing four out of the eight on board.

== 1960 ==
- July 16 - A de Havilland Dragon Riptide carrying the Danish Football team crashed in the Øresund. All but one of the nine people were killed.

== 1963 ==
- March 5 – A Piper PA-24 carrying Patsy Cline, Cowboy Copas and Hawkshaw Hawkins crashed, killing all people on board.
- October 22 – A BAC One-Eleven crashed during a test flight near Chicklade, United Kingdom, killing all seven people on board.

== 1965 ==
- July 20 - A Cambrian Airways Vickers Viscount crashed into a factory on approach to Liverpool. Both crew members died, along with two more on the ground.

== 1966 ==
- June 4 - A Hawker Siddeley Trident enters a deep stall during a test flight and crashes in England, killing all four on board.
- July 4 - An Air New Zealand Douglas DC-8 on a training flight crashes on takeoff after reverse thrust is inadvertently deployed. Two of the five on board are killed.
- December 24 - A Flying Tiger Line CL-44 struck a tree and crashed upside down in Da Nang, Vietnam. All four people on board were killed, along with 107 people on the ground

== 1967 ==
- March 30 - Delta Air Lines Flight 9877, a Douglas DC-8 crashes into a residential area during a scheduled training flight. All six people on board were killed, along with thirteen people on the ground.
- November 15 - X-15 Flight 3-65-97, an X-15 broke up on launch. The pilot, Michael J. Adams was killed.

== 1969 ==
- August 31 - A Cessna 172 carrying Rocky Marciano crashed in Newton. All three people on board, including Rocky were killed.

== 1970 ==
- January 5 – A Spantax Convair 990 crashed shortly after takeoff from Stockholm's Arlanda Airport when the flight crew lost control of the aircraft; five of the ten people on board were killed.
- September 6 – Trans International Airlines Flight 863, a Douglas DC-8 on a repositioning flight, crashed on takeoff from JFK International Airport in New York killing all 11 people on board.

== 1971 ==
- May 28 – A Colorado Aviation Aero Commander 680 crashed on Brush Mountain, Virginia, killing all six people on board, including Audie Murphy

== 1972 ==
- May 30 – Delta Air Lines Flight 9570, a McDonnell Douglas DC-9 operating as a training flight, crashed while attempting to land at Greater Southwest International Airport in Fort Worth, Texas, United States due to wake turbulence from a DC-10 that landed moments earlier; all four crew members were killed.
- December 31 - A DC-7 crashed into the ocean near Pinones, Carolina, Isla Verde due to an engine failure. All five people on board were killed, including Roberto Clemente.

== 1973 ==
- February 26 - A Learjet 24 crashed due to a birdstrike. All seven people on board are killed and one person on the ground is injured.
- June 3 - A Tupolev Tu-144 disintegrated and crashed at Goussainville. All six crew members were killed along with nine people on the ground.

== 1974 ==
- August 9 - Buffalo 461, a De Haviland Canada DHC 5 Buffalo, is shot down over Syria. All nine people on board were killed.

== 1975 ==
- March 31 - A Royal Nepal Airlines Pilatus PC-6 crashed in Nepal, killing all five people on board.
- November 12 - Overseas National Airways Flight 032, a DC-10 struck a flock of gulls and caught fire. All 139 on board survived
- November 29 - A Piper Pa-23 Aztec crashed, killing all six people on board, including Graham Hill.

== 1977 ==
- January 5 - In the Connellan air disaster, a former employee of Connellan Airways flew a Beechcraft Baron at the Connellan Airways complex at Alice Springs Airport. The person aboard the Baron was killed, along with four more on the complex.
- March 17 - A British Airtours Boeing 707 doing a test flight crashed on takeoff from Glasgow Airport. All four crew members on board survived, with only one injury.
- May 14 - A Dan-Air Boeing 707 on behalf of IAS crashed on approach to Zambia. All six crew members were killed.
- August 1 – A Bell 206B carrying Francis Gary crashed in a park in Encino, Los Angeles. Francis was killed

== 1978 ==
- May 23 - A Tupolev Tu-144 making a test flight crashed in Yegoryevsk after an engine leak. Two of the eight people on board were killed.
- December 22 - A Cessna 188 disappeared over the ocean. The only other commercial aircraft, an Air New Zealand DC-10 from Fiji to Auckland searched for hours the Cessna 188, until it was spotted. The plane then reached Norfolk Island with no fatalities on board the Cessna or DC-10

== 1979 ==
- February 17 - Air New Zealand Flight 4374, a Fokker F-27 crashed on approach to Auckland. Two of the four people on board.
- March 26 - An Interflug Ilyushin Il-18 overshot the runway in Luanda, Angola. All ten people on board were killed.
- July 26 - Lufthansa Cargo Flight 527, a Boeing 707 from Brazil to Dakar crashed into a mountain shortly after takeoff from Galeão. All three people on board were killed.
- December 18 - In the 1979 Mosfellsheiði air crashes, two Cessna 172 crashed in Mosfellsheiði less than four hours. All people on both aircraft were killed.

== 1980 ==
- June 1 - In the Barra do Garças air disaster, a pilot tried to crash a small plane into the Hotel Presidente. The pilot was killed, along with six people on the ground.
- November 3 - A Latin Carga Convair CV-880 crashed near the end of the runway at Caracas, Venezuela. All four people on board were killed.

== 1981 ==
- July 18 - A Sukhoi Su-15 of the Soviet Air Force collided with the stabilizer of a T.A.R CL-44. All four people on board the CL-44 died, while the pilot of the Sukhoi ejected.
- August 9 - A Cessna 210 Centurion with the registration VH-MDX disappeared in the Barrington Tops National Park.

== 1983 ==
- July 1 - A CAAK Ilyushin Il-62 carrying construction workers and technicians crashed into mountainous terrain in Guinea on approach to Conakry after a flight from Pyongyang, North Korea via Bamako. All 23 people on board were killed.
- December 14 - A TAMPA Colombia Boeing 707 on a ferry flight crashed shortly after takeoff from Olaya Herrera Airport after an engine failure leading to a loss of control. All three on board were killed, including twenty two people on the ground.

== 1985 ==
- February 24 - Polar 3, a Dornier 228 is shot down by guerrillas of the Polisario Front over the Western Sahara. All three people on board were killed.
- November 10 - A Dassault Falcon 50 and a Piper Pa-32 Cherokee collided over Teterboro. All five people on board both aircraft died, along with one person on the ground.
- December 31 - A Douglas DC-3 had a cabin fire and crash-landed in a field while on a flight from Guntersville to Dallas. The aircraft was owned by Ricky. The seven passengers, including Ricky Nelson died after they couldn't escape the cabin

== 1986 ==
- April 5 - An Eagle Air Piper Pa-23 crashed in Iceland. Five of the seven people on board were killed.

== 1988 ==
- September 7 - Angolan forces attempt to shot down a British Aerospace BAe-125 that was carrying the Botswana president from Gaborone to Luanda. The plane made a safe emergency landing. All 10 on board survived, with four injuries.

== 1990 ==
- August 27 - A Bell 206 helicopter carrying Stevie Ray Vaughan crashed into a hill in the Alpine Valley Resort, near East Troy, Wisconsin. Stevie was killed, along with four more people.

== 1991 ==
- October 25 - A Bell 206 carrying three people, including Bill Graham crashed into a transmission tower west of Vallejo, California. Bill and the two people on board died.

== 1992 ==
- August 27 – A NewCal Aviation de Havilland Canada DHC-4 crashed near Gimli. All three people on board were killed.

== 1993 ==
- April 1 - A Swearingen Merlin carrying Alan Kulwicki crashed in Tennessee. All people, including Alan were killed.
- April 27 - A De Havilland Canada DHC-5 Buffalo carrying the Zambian Football team crashed near Gabon after an engine fire. All people on board were killed. It's the deadliest plane crash in Gabon.
- August 12 - A helicopter making a training flight crashed in Llyn Padarn. All seven people were killed.
- November 26 - Two Airwork aircraft collided over Auckland. All four people on board were killed.

== 1994 ==
- April 6 - A Dassault Falcon carrying the Rwandan President was shot down on approach, killing all twelve people on board.
- June 30 – Airbus Industrie Flight 129, an Airbus A330 on a test flight, crashes at France's Toulouse-Blagnac Airport, killing all seven on board.

== 1995 ==
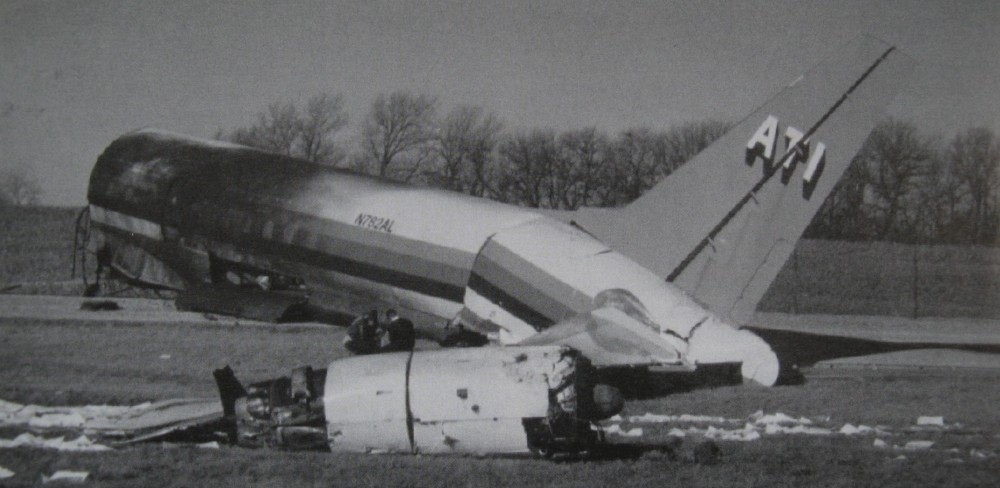
Wreckage of Air Transport International Flight 782

- January 30 – TransAsia Airways Flight 510A, an ATR 72–200 on a re-positioning flight from Penghu to Taipei, crashes into a hill in Guishan District, Taoyuan, killing all four crew members.
- February 10 – An Antonov An-70 and an Antonov An-72, both on a test flight operated by Antonov Design Bureau, collided over Borodianka. All seven on board the An-70 were killed, while the An-72 landed with no fatalities among the five on board.
- February 16 – Air Transport International Flight 782, a Douglas DC-8 on a re-positioning flight, crashes after failing to get airborne at Kansas City International Airport, Missouri, killing all three crew members.

== 1996 ==
- March 2 - A Learjet 25 carrying the Mamonas Assassinas comedy rock band crashed into the Serra da Cantaneira mountain in São Paulo. All people on board, including the members of the band died.
- December 22 – Airborne Express Flight 827, a Douglas DC-8, stalls and crashes during a test flight in Narrows, Virginia, killing all six people on board.
- December 24 - A Learjet 35A crashed in Dorchester, New Hampshire. Both crew members, the only people on board were killed.

== 1999 ==
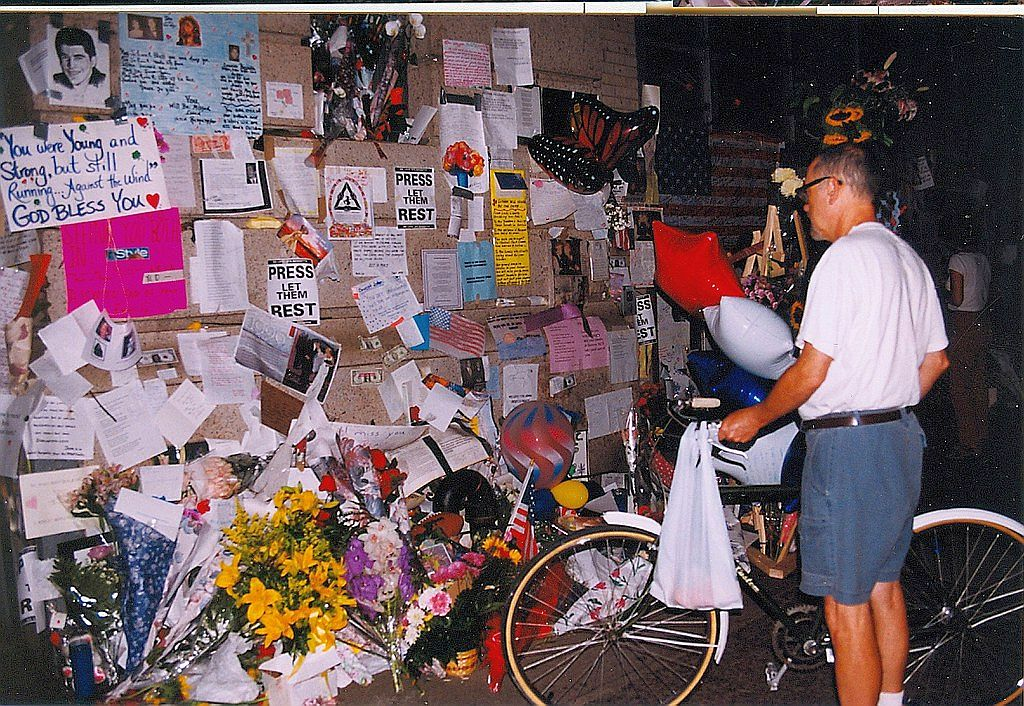
Memorial at Jr's house after the crash

- July 16 - A Piper Pa-28 carrying John F. Kennedy Jr crashed at Martha's Vineyard. All three people on board, including Jr were killed.
- September 3 - Edinburgh Air Charter Flight 3W, a Cessna 404 Titan carrying Airtours employees crashed shortly after takeoff from Glasgow. Eight of the eleven people on board were killed.

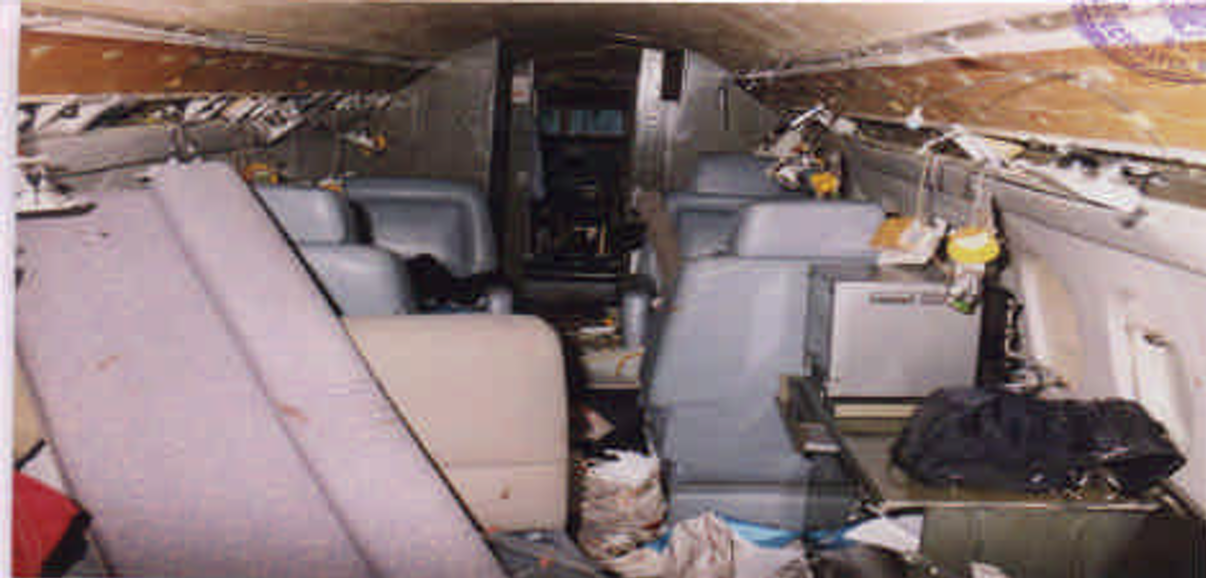
The cabin of Olympic Airways Flight 3838 after the accident

- September 14 - Olympic Airways Flight 3838, a Dassault Falcon 900 suffers severe turbulence over Călineşti after pilot induced oscillations. Seven of the thirteen people on board were killed.

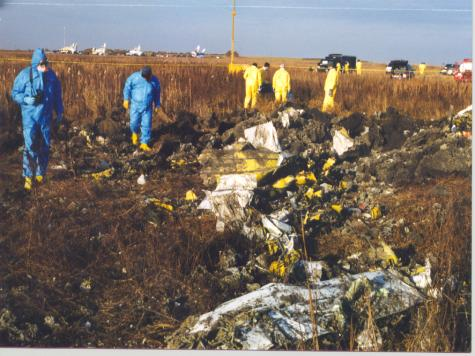
The wreckage of the 1999 South Dakota Learjet crash

- October 25 - A Learjet 35 carrying Payne Stewart crashed into a field near Aberdeen, South Dakota. All six people on board were killed.

== 2000 ==
- February 8 - A Zlin 242L piloted by Bob Collins collided with a Cessna 172 over Zion. The Zlin impacted a hospital's roof, injuring five people on the ground. The Cessna crashed onto a residential street just three blocks away. All three people on board both aircraft were killed

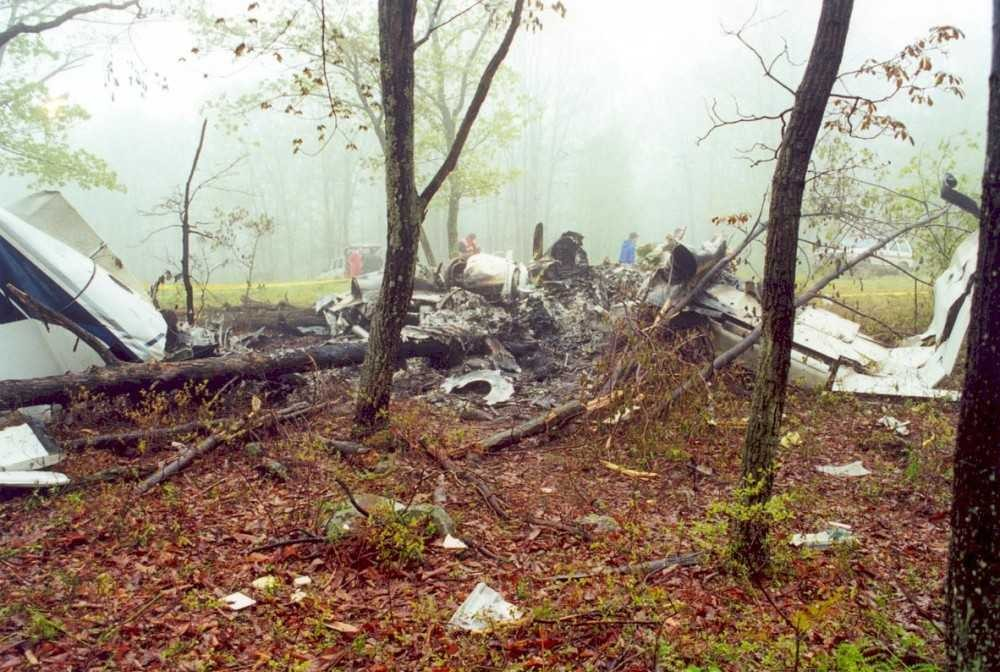
The crash site of the 2000 East Coast Aviation Services British Aerospace Jetstream crash

- May 21 - A Jetstream 3101 operated by East Coast Services crashed after running out of fuel. All nineteen people on board, which were professional gamblers, were killed.
- August 7 - A Cessna 210 Centurion crashed after running out of fuel. All six people on board were killed.
- September 4 – A Beechcraft 200 Super King Air on a charter flight transporting workers for the mining company Sons of Gwalia crashed, killing all eight people on board.

== 2001 ==
- January 27 - The surviving Antonov An-70 overran the runway at Omsk. All thirty-three people on board survived and the aircraft was repaired.
- January 27 - A Beechcraft King Air carrying the Oklahoma Cowboys crashed during a snow storm. All ten people on board were killed.
- March 29 – In the 2001 Avjet Aspen crash, an Avjet charter flight, a Gulfstream III jet with 15 passengers and three crew, crashed on approach into Aspen, Colorado, killing all on board.
- April 20 - A Cessna 185 was shot down by a Cessna Dragonfly near the Peru-Brazil border. Two of the five people on board were killed.
- August 25 – A Blackhawk International Airways Cessna 402B crashed near the Abaco Islands, Bahamas, killing all nine on board.

== 2002 ==
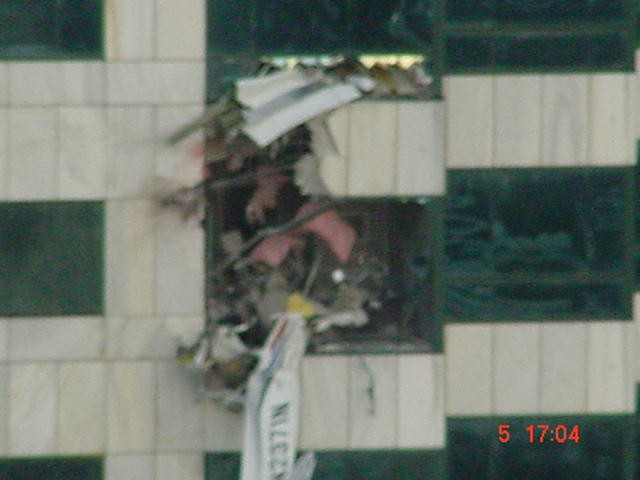
The aftermath of the 2002 Tampa Cessna 172 crash

- January 5 - Charles J. Bishop, a high school student stole a Cessna 172, and crashed the plane into the Bank of America Tower. Charles was killed, and the building was damaged.
- April 18 - A Rockwell Commander 112 crashed into the upper floors of the Pirelli Tower. The pilot, along with two on the ground were killed. Some further sixty people on the ground were injured.
- July 22 - Pulkovo Aviation Enterprise Flight 9560, an Ilyushin Il-86 on a repositioning flight, crashes shortly after takeoff from Sheremetyevo-Moscow Airport. 14 of the 16 people on board were killed.

== 2004 ==
- October 14 – Pinnacle Airlines Flight 3701, a CRJ-200 on a repositioning flight with no passengers, crashes near Jefferson City, Missouri, killing both pilots.
- October 24 - A Beechcraft King Air operated by Hendrick Motorsports crashed in mountainous terrain. All ten people on board were killed, including Ricky Hendrick.

== 2005 ==
- March 15 - A Loganair Britten Norman Islander crashed off the coast of Scotland, killing both pilots, the only people on board.

== 2006 ==
- October 11 - A Cirrus SR-20 carrying pitcher Cory Lidle crashed into the Belaire Apartments. Both people, including Lidle were killed.
- October 26 - A Swedish Coast Guard CASA C-212 crashed into the Falsterbo Canal in Sweden. All four people on board were killed. The cause was a wing failure due to metal fatigue.
- December 10 - A medevac Bell 412 operated by Mercy Air crashed near Cajon Pass, the 3 people on board died.

== 2007 ==
- March 5 - A helicopter operated by Helog and a Diamond DA20 collided over Zell am See. All five people on board both aircraft were killed.
- July 27 - Two AS350 Écureuil helicopters filming a police chase, owned by KNXV-TV and KTVK collided over Phoenix, Arizona. Four people died, and no one on the ground was killed.
- November 4 - A Reali Taxi Aéreo Learjet 35 overran the runway on landing at Campo de Marte Airport, Brazil and crashed at Rua Bernardino de Sena, Casa Verde, São Paulo. Both crew members on board, including a family of six on the ground died.

== 2008 ==
- March 30 - A Cessna Citation with two former racers crashed into a house shortly after takeoff from Biggin Hill. All five people on board died, including David Leslie and Richard Lloyd.
- September 19 - A Learjet 60 carrying Travis Barker and DJ AM crashed after aborting takeoff. Barker and AM were the only survivors, while the other four people on board died.
- November 4 - A Learjet 45 carrying nine people on board crashed near Paseo de la Reforma after wake turbulence from a Mexicana Boeing 767. All nine people on board were killed, including seven people on the ground.
- November 27 - An Airbus A320 with seven people on board crashed into the Mediterranean Sea on an acceptance flight. All seven people died.

== 2009 ==
- January 9 - A Gazpromavia Mil Mi-17, operating an aerial hunting expedition, crashed in the Altai Republic, Russia. Eight of the 11 people on board were killed.
- March 25 - A Medair Bell 206 crashed into Mount Keş. Initially, one passenger will survive but died days later. All six people on board were killed.
- August 8 - A Piper PA-32 Cherokee collided with an Airbus AS350 operating by Liberty Helicopter Sightseeing Tours over the Hudson River. All nine people on both aircraft were killed.
- September 2 - A Bell 430, operated by the Andhra Pradesh Government and carrying chief minister Y. S. Rajasekhara Reddy, crashed near Kurnool, India. All five people on board were killed.
- September 24 - South African Airlink Flight 8911, a BAe Jetstream 41 on a repositioning flight crashed into the field of a secondary school in Merebank, Durban after an incorrect engine shutdown. Initially, all three people on board will survive, but a crew member died a few days later. A person on the ground was injured.
- November 18 – An IAI 1124 Westwind ditched in the Pacific Ocean 3.2 nautical miles (6 km) west of Norfolk Island after failing to land at the island's airport, en route from Samoa to Melbourne, Australia; all six people on board survived the incident.

== 2010 ==
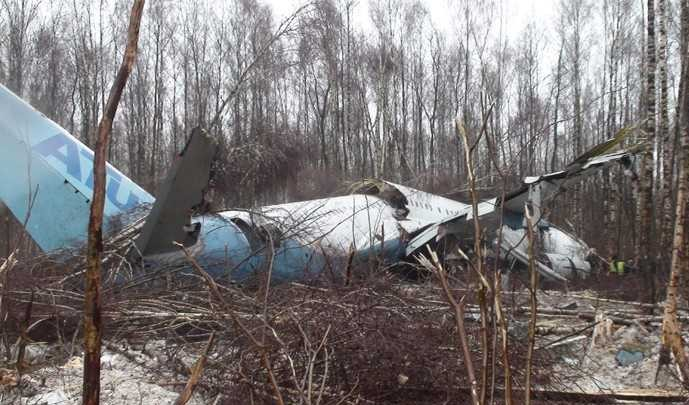
Wreckage of Aviastar-TU Flight 1906

- January 17 - A private Piper Pa-32 crashed off Bimini, Bahamas, after entering adverse weather. All three people on board were killed.
- January 21 - An AgustaWestland AW139 operating as Helimer 207 crashed into the Mediterranean Sea while on three training exercises. Three of the four people on board died.
- February 18 - In the 2010 Austin suicide attack, a Piper Dakota was directely flown into an IRS building in Austin, Texas. The pilot was killed, along with an IRS employee on the ground.
- March 22 – Aviastar-TU Flight 1906, a Tupolev Tu-204 on a ferry flight, crashed on landing at Domodedovo Airport after a flight from Hurghada. All eight crew members on board are injured, but survived. It's the first hull loss of a Tupolev Tu-204.
- June 19 - An Air Service Berlin Douglas C-47 on a sightseeing flight from Berlin Schönefeld back to the airport crashed while returning to the airport. All 28 people on board survived, but seven people were injured.
- July 31 - A Conair CV-580 doing a tanker flight crashed near Lytton, Canada after a stall caused by the aircraft striking a tree. Both pilots were killed.
- August 9 - A DHC-3 carrying Ted Stevens crashed in Alaska during poor weather. Five of the nine people on board were killed, including Stevens
- September 4 - A FU-24 carrying skydivers crashed shortly after takeoff from Fox Glacier after the aircraft pitched up. All nine people on board were killed.

== 2011 ==
- March 5 – An Antonov An-148 crashed near Garbuzovo during a test flight operated by VASO. All 6 people on board were killed.
- April 2 – Gulfstream Aerospace Flight 153, a Gulfstream G650, crashed during a test flight near Roswell Air Center. All four on board were killed.
- May 18 – Omega Aerial Refueling Services Flight 70, a Boeing 707-321B, crashed during takeoff at Naval Air Station Point Mugu, United States, after the engines separated, all 3 on board survived.
- June 12 – A Lightship Europe airship crashed and caught fire while landing in Reichelsheim, Germany, after a flight from Oberursel, killing one of the four people on board.
- August 14 - Two privately owned Piaggio P.166 aircraft flying in formation crashed into a mountain in Tzaneen, South Africa in dense mist. All 13 people on both aircraft died.
- September 16 - The Galloping Ghost, a P-51 crashed into spectators at the Reno Air Races. The pilot was killed, along with ten people on the ground. Sixty nine people on the ground were also injured.
- November 11 - A Piper Cherokee aircraft crashed in Arkansas. All 4 people on board died, including Kurt Budke
- December 10 - A Beechcraft Queen Air crashed in the Parañaque slum, near Manila after takeoff from Ninoy Aquino International Airport. All three people on board died, with 11 others on the ground killed. 20 further people were injured.

== 2012 ==
- January 7 - An Early Morning Balloons hot air balloon struck power lines and crashed near Carterton, New Zealand. All 11 people on board were killed.
- January 23 - A Yakovlev Yak-52 crashed at a remote control plane park during a slow roll. Both crew members were killed. Witnesses said that the aircraft passed by a few meters from their planes.
- February 12 – A Katanga Express Gulfstream IV crashed after overrunning the runway at Kavumu Airport, Democratic Republic of the Congo, killing four of the 12 people on board, and two people on the ground.
- May 9 – A Sukhoi Superjet 100 crashed, into Mount Salak, Indonesia, on an exhibition flight, killing all 45 passengers and crew on board.
- June 6 - An Air Class Líneas Aéreas Swearingen crashed in Isla de Flores. The two people on board died.
- August 18 - Aviatour Flight 4431, a Piper Seneca, crashed into the water near Masbate. All four people on board were killed.
- August 23 - An hot air balloon crashed in the Ljubljana Marshes during a storm. Six of the 32 people on board were killed.
- October 1 - Riama, a 1934 De Havilland Dragon, crashed in Upper Kandanga after a loss of control. All six people on board were killed
- December 9 - A Learjet 25 carrying Jenni Rivera crashed shortly after takeoff from Monterrey. All seven people on board, including Jenni were killed.
- December 29 - Red Wings Airlines Flight 9268, a Tupolev Tu-204 on a repositioning flight, overran the runway and caught fire on landing at Vnukovo Airport. Five of the eight crew members are killed in the first fatal accident of the Tupolev Tu-204.

== 2013 ==
- January 16 - An Agusta A109 crashed into the crane attached to the St. George Wharf Tower in Vauxhall. The pilot, Peter Barnes and a pedestrian on the ground were killed.
- February 26 - An hot air balloon caught fire and crashed near Luxor, Egypt, killing 19 of the 21 people on board.
- June 29 - A Zlin Z526 crashed while making an illegal airshow near Eberswalde-Finow Airfield. The pilot was the only death.
- November 19 - A Learjet 35A crashed shortly after takeoff from Fort Lauderdale after a thurst reverser deployment. All four people on board were killed.
- December 2 - IBC Airways Flight 405, a Fairchild Swearingen Metroliner operated by IBC Airways crashed on La Alianza, Puerto Rico after the aircraft broke up. Both crew members died.
- December 26 - An Irkut-Avia Antonov An-12 crashed into a military storage unit on approach to International Airport Irkutsk. All 9 people on board died.

== 2014 ==
- January 20 - Școala Superioară de Aviație Civilă Flight 111, a Britten-Norman Islander operated by the SSAvC crashed in the Apuseni Mountains, Romania. Two of the seven people on board died.
- March 13 - A Haughey Air AgustaWestland AW139 crashed near Gillingham, United Kingdom, killing all four people on board.
- May 31 - A Gulfstream IV crashed in Bedford, Massachusetts. All seven people on board, including Lewis Katz, the co-owner of The Philadelphia Inquirer and more.
- June 23 - A Learjet 35 owned by GFD collided with a Typhoon over Olsberg. Both crew members of the Learjet were killed; the pilot of the Typhoon made a safe landing.
- August 13 - A Cessna Citation doing a flight crashed in Santos, Brazil while trying to land at Santos Air Base. All 7 people on board died.
- October 20 - Unijet Flight 074P, a Dassault Falcon 50 struck a snow plow while taking off from Vnukovo in poor visibility. All four people on board, including Christophe de Margerie were killed.
- October 30 - A Beechcraft King Air crashed into a building hosting a FlightSafety International test. The pilot, the only one on board was killed, along with three people on the ground.
- October 31 - The VSS Enterprise, attached to the SpaceShip Two broke up and crashed in the Mojave Desert. Co-pilot, Michael Alsbury was killed, while pilot Peter Siebold ejected and was seriously injured.

== 2015 ==
- January 29 - A Challenger 601 was shot down over Aruba. All three people on board were killed.
- March 9 - Two privately owned Eurocopter AS350 Écureuil helicopters collided in mid-air over Villa Castelli while carrying Florence Arthaud, Camille Muffat and Alexis Vastine for French reality show Dropped. All 10 people on both helicopters died.
- May 9 - An Airbus A400M prototype crashed near Seville, Spain after three engines were feathered. Four of the six people on board were killed.
- July 7 - A Cessna 150 and an F-16 collided over Moncks Corner. The F-16 pilot ejected, however the two people on board the Cessna died.
- July 31 - A Phenom 300 carrying the Osama Bin Laden family overran the runway and crashed into a car park next to Blackbushe Airport. The family was killed.
- August 20 - Two Let L-410, operating on a formation skydiving flight, collided in mid-air near Červený Kameň, Slovakia. Three of the 19 people on board the first plane, and four of the 19 on board the second one died, with a total death toll of seven.
- November 10 - Execuflight Flight 1526, a Hawker 800 stalled and crashed into a house on approach to Dayton, Ohio. All nine people on board were killed, but no one on the ground was killed
- November 21 - A Eurocopter AS350 Écureuil operated by Alpine Adventures crashed in Fox Glacier after it was overloaded while on a sightseeing flight from the glacier's aerodrome back to it. All 7 people on board died.

== 2016 ==
- March 29 - A Mitsubishi Mu-2 crashed on approach to the Magdalen Islands. Initially, a passenger would survive, but the survivor died of a heart attack. All seven people on board were killed.
- June 2 – A medevac Eurocopter EC135, operating an evacuation flight in Moldova, crashed near Haragîș, Moldova. All four people on board were killed.
- July 6 – The Bell 525 Relentless prototype broke up over Texas, destroying it and killing the people onboard
- July 30 - An hot air balloon caught fire and crashed near Lockhard, Texas, after impacting power lines. All 16 people on board were killed.
- October 31 - An Alfa Indonesia DHC-4 Caribou crashed in the Papuan jungle while en route to Ilaga, Indonesia. All four people died.

== 2017 ==
- February 21 - A Beechcraft Super King Air crashed through the roof of a DFO shopping center. All five people on board were killed, but no one on the ground was killed. The incident was caught on camera.
- March 10 - A Sikorsky S-76++ of Swan Aviation crashed onto the D100 highway in low visibility after hitting the Endem Tower. All seven people on board were killed, but no one on the ground was killed.
- March 14 - A Sikorsky S-92 helicopter named Rescue 116 crashed into Blackrock while on a rescue operation off County Mayo, Ireland. All four people, including Dara Fitzpatrick.
- May 15 - A Learjet 35 operated by Trans-Pacific Air Charter crashed onto a car parking lot on approach to Teterboro after a stall. Both pilots were killed.
- September 8 - A Schweizer 269C crashed in New Jersey, on the city of Medford. The pilot and Troy Gentry was killed.
- December 31 - A Sydney Seaplanes DHC-2 Beaver crashed into Jerusalem Bay, near Cowan Creek shortly after takeoff. All six people on board, including Richard Cousins were killed.

== 2018 ==
- January 17 - A Sapphire Aviation Bell UH-1H Iroquois crashed near Raton, New Mexico after the helicopter goes into terrain. Five of the six people on board were killed.
- March 11 - A Challenger 604 owned by MC Aviation stalled and crashed in the Zagros Mountains. All eleven people were killed.
- March 11 - A Eurocopter AS350 operated by Liberty Helicopters crashed into the East River after losing engine power. Five of the six people were killed.
- June 28 - A Beechcraft King Air owned by UY Aviation crashed in Jagruti Nagar after losing orientation and pilot error. All five people on board were killed, along with one person on the ground.
- July 10 - In the 2018 Pretoria Convair 340 crash a Convair 340, operated by Dutch aviation museum Aviodrome, crashed during a test flight near Pretoria in South Africa killing 2 of the 19 people on board and one person on the ground.
- August 4 - A K2 Aviation De Havilland Beaver crashed at the Denali National Park after undetermined reasons. Initially, all five people would survive, but the five people died before rescue arrived.
- October 27 - A Leonardo AW169 operated by Amadeus Aviation crashed shortly after takeoff from King Power Stadium en route to Luton. All 5 people on board died, including Vichai Srivaddhanaprabha.
- December 24 - A helicopter operated by Servicios Aéreos del Altiplano crashed into a hill in Coronango, Puebla, Mexico. All 5 people on board were killed, including newly elected governor of Puebla Martha Érika Alonso Hidalgo.

== 2019 ==
- January 21 - A Piper PA-46 Malibu carrying Emiliano Sala broke up and crashed into the English Channel. The pilot and Sala were killed.
- February 11 - A Bell 206 crashed into the Rodoanel Mario Covas highway while making an emergency landing after a mechanical failure. Both people on board were killed, including Ricardo Boechat.
- February 27 - An Air Dynasty Eurocopter AS350 crashed near Taplejung, Nepal, killing all seven people on board.
- May 5 - A Challenger 604 private jet crashed in Coahuila. All people on board died.
- July 14 - A Gippsland GA8 Airvan used for skydiving crashed near Umeå, Sweden, killing all nine people on board.
- August 31 - An Airbus AS350 operated by Helitrans crashed into the mountains of Skoddevarre in Alta, Norway. All six people on board died.
- September 1 - A Beechcraft King Air doing a medical evacuation crashed in the Agojo Resort. All nine people on board were killed, and two people on the ground were injured.
- October 2 - A Boeing B-17 that was minimizing Nine-O-Nine and chartered by the Collins Foundation crashed on final approach after a double engine failure. Seven of the thirteen people on board were killed, and one person on the ground was injured.

== 2020 ==
- January 23 - A Coulson Aviation C-130 tanker crashed at Cooma while fighting the 2019-2020 Australian bushfires after the aircraft stalled. All three crew members were killed.
- January 26 - In the 2020 Calabasas helicopter crash, a Sikorsky S-76 carrying Kobe Bryant crashed in Calabasas, California. All nine people, including Kobe were killed.
- July 31 - A High Adventure Air Charter de Havilland Canada DHC-2 Beaver collided in mid-air with a private Piper PA-12. All seven on board both aircraft were killed.

== 2021 ==
- January 24 - A Beechcraft Baron carrying the Palmas e Regatas football team crashed shortly after takeoff. All people aboard were killed.
- March 5 - A Robinson R44 helicopter carrying Sasa Klaas and the pilot crashed on the outskirts of Xumabee Game Ranch, Sojwe, Botswana. Sasa and the pilot died.
- March 7 - A Eurocopter AS350 Ecueril crashed in Touques. Both people on board were killed, including billionaire Olivier Dassault.
- May 29 - A Cessna Citation crashed into Percy Priest Lake. All people on board were killed, including Joe Lara.
- October 3 - A Pilatus PC-12 crashed into a building near a train station. All eight people on board were killed, including Dan Petrescu.
- November 5 - A Beechcraft King Air carrying Marília Mendonça crashed in rocky terrain on approach to Piedade de Caratinga. All five people on board, including Marilia were killed.
- December 15 – A Helidosa Aviation Group's Gulfstream IV crashed near Punta Caucedo, Dominican Republic, while flying from Santo Domingo to Orlando. All nine people on board were killed, including professional Puerto Rican singer known as Flow La Movie

== 2022 ==
- February 3 - A Cessna 172 crash-landed on the frozen Þingvallavatn. All four people on board were killed.
- September 4 - A Cessna Citation crashed into the Baltic Sea after the pilots passed out due to hypoxia. All people on board were killed.

== 2023 ==
- January 2 – In the 2023 Gold Coast mid-air collision, two Eurocopter EC130s operated by Sea World Helicopters collided near Gold Coast, Queensland, Australia, killing four and injuring eight.
- January 18 – In the 2023 Brovary helicopter crash, a Ukrainian Eurocopter EC225 carrying ten people on board including 7 from the Interior Ministry of Ukraine crashes into a kindergarten in Brovary, Ukraine. All 10 people on board are killed, as well as 4 people on the ground with an additional 25 injured.
- February 6 – In the 2023 Coulson Aviation crash, a Boeing 737-300 owned by Coulson Aviation used as an air tanker crashes at Fitzgerald River National Park in the Great Southern Region in Western Australia while fighting multiple fires. Both occupants on board survive but sustain minor injuries.
- May 1 - In the 2023 Colombia Cessna 206 crash, a Cessna 206 Stationair crashed into the jungle of the Caqueta Department, killing 3, leaving four children as survivors
- June 4 - A Cessna 560 Citation V crashed in Virginia killing all four people on board.
- July 17 - In the 2023 Poland Cessna 208 crash, a privately owned Cessna 208 crashed into a hangar in an airfield in Chrcynno, Poland, killing the pilot and 5 on the ground, as well as injuring 7.
- August 17 - In the 2023 Elmina plane crash, a Beechcraft 390 Premier I operated by Jet Valet crashed onto an expressway interchange near Elmina, Sungai Buloh, Selangor, Malaysia, travelling from Langkawi International Airport to Sultan Abdul Aziz Shah Airport, killing 10 people and 2 people on the ground, including Johari Harun
- August 23 – In the 2023 Wagner Group plane crash, an Embraer Legacy 600 owned by MNT-Aero LLC crashes in Kuzhenkino, Tver Oblast, Russia, on its way from Moscow to St. Petersburg, killing all of the 10 people on board.

== 2024 ==
- February 9 – Hop-A-Jet Flight 823 a Bombardier Challenger 600 flying a domestic flight between Ohio State University Airport and Naples Airport, Florida crashes onto Interstate 75 in southern Florida, United States. Both pilots are killed while the three passenger escape.
- February 9 - A Eurocopter EC-130 crashed near the Halloran Springs. All six people on board were killed, including Herbert Wigwe and Abimbola Ogunbanjo.
- April 23 - An AgustaWestland AW139 and a Eurocopter Fennec collided in the Malaysian town of Lumut. The helicopters were practicing for the commemoration of the 90th anniversary of the Malaysian Navy. All 10 people on board died.
- July 12 – Gazpromavia Flight 9608, a Sukhoi Superjet 100 on a ferry flight from Lukhovitsy to Moscow, crashed near Moscow whilst attempting an emergency landing. All three crew members were killed.

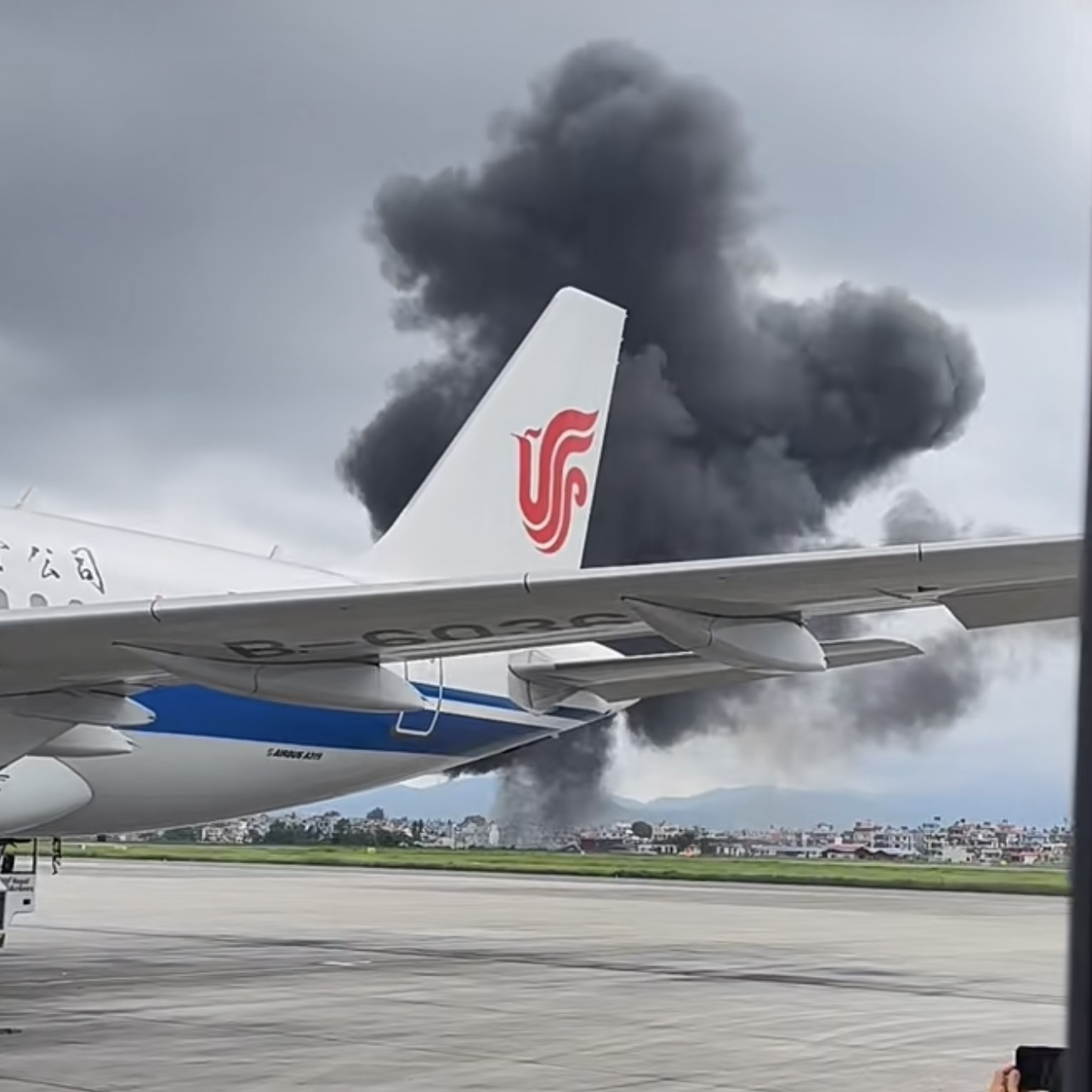
Smoke rising from the crash site of the Saurya Airlines CRJ200

- July 24 – A Saurya Airlines Bombardier CRJ-200ER crashed shortly after taking off from Kathmandu Tribhuvan Airport, whilst en route to Pokhara International Airport, killing 18 of the 19 occupants on board.
- July 26 - A Pilatus PC-12 crashed near Gillette, Wyoming, starting a wildfire. All seven people on board were killed.
- October 21 – A New Way Cargo Airlines Ilyushin Il-76 crashed in Darfur, Sudan, after reportedly being shot down by missiles fired by the Rapid Support Forces, while conducting a cargo flight from the United Arab Emirates to Chad. All five crew members on board were killed.
- December 22 - A Piper PA-42 crashed into a resort shortly after takeoff from Canela Airport. All ten people on board were killed. A person on the ground was injured and the accident was caught on camera.

== 2025 ==
- January 31 - Med Jets Flight 056, a Learjet 55 operating an air ambulance flight, crashed shortly after takeoff from Northeast Philadelphia Airport. All six people on board were killed, as well as one on the ground.
- April 10 - A Bell 206 helicopter operated by New York Helicopters as New York Helicopters Flight 39 crashed in the Hudson River. All six people on board were killed.
- May 3 - An IBM Airlines Boeing 737 was at Nyala Airport, South Sudan when it was destroyed. 54 people on board died.
- May 22 - A Cessna Citation II crashed in San Diego while doing a flight. All people on board were killed.
- June 21 – A Sobrevoar hot air balloon suffered from an in-flight fire and crashed near Praia Grande, Brazil. Eight of the 21 people on board were killed.
- September 23 - A Cessna 175 on a flight crashed in Barra Mansa farm, Aquidauana, Brazil. All four people on board, including Kongjian Yu were killed.
- December 18 - A Cessna Citation II, owned by NASCAR driver Greg Biffle, crashed on landing at Statesville Airport, North Carolina. All seven people on board were killed.
- December 23 - Harmony Jets Flight 185 crashed in Ankara, Turkey shortly after takeoff. All eight people were killed, including Libyan Army chief Mohammed Ali Ahmed al-Haddad.

== 2026 ==
- January 20 - A Robinson R44 helicopter crashed in Mount Aso, Japan during a sightseeing flight from Cuddly Dominion back there. The three people on board are missing.
- January 25 - A Bombardier Challenger 650 crashed on takeoff from Bangor, Maine. All 7 people on board were killed.
- January 28 - A VSR Aviation Learjet 45 carrying Ajit Pawar crashed on landing at Chhatrapati Shivaji Maharaj International Airport. All people on board, including Ajit were killed.
- May 14 - A Beechcraft C90 King Air crashed near Ruidoso, New Mexico, while on a medical flight from Roswell to Sierra Bianca. All four people on board were killed. The crash started a forest fire.
- June 14 - A Eurocopter AS 350 B2 and a Bell 206B collided above Rio de Janeiro, Brazil, killing all combined six passengers, including singer Oliver Tree, YouTuber Gaspi and director Lucas Vignale.
- June 14 - A PAC P-750, operating a skydiving flight, crashed near Butler, Missouri, killing all 12 people on board.
- June 26 - A man deliberately crashed a Sunward SA60L into the China Zun skyscraper in Beijing, China. The plane's occupant was killed and 13 people on the ground were injured.
- June 28 - A Pilatus PC-6, scheduled to operate a skydiving flight, crashed shortly after take off from Nancy, France. All 11 people on board were killed.
- August 19 - A chartered Eurocopter EC130 B4 crashed into Mount Ololokwe, Kenya, while flying from the Loisaba Conservancy to Ewaso Ng'iro. All seven people on board were killed.
- September 15 - A KNBC news Eurocopter AS350 crashed in Los Angeles, California. Both occupants of the aircraft and a person on the ground were killed.
