= 2013 Eberswalde-Finow Zlin crash =

2013 aviation accident in Germany

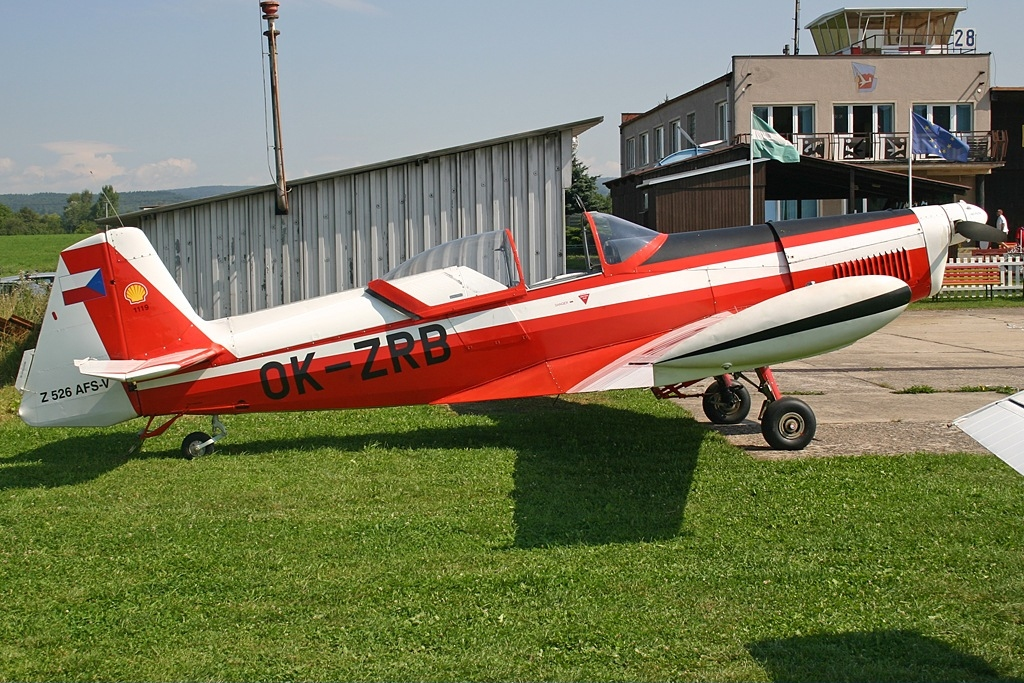
- OK-ZRB, the aircraft involved

Accident
- Date: 29 June 2013
- Summary: Crash due to fuel starvation and pilot error
- Site: Near Eberswalde Finow Airfield, Germany; 52.829431°N 13.683274°E

Aircraft
- Aircraft type: Zlin Aviation
- Aircraft name: Z 526 AFS-V
- Registration: OK-ZRB (not valid)
- Flight origin: Eberswalde Finow Airfield; ICAO EDAV
- Crew: 1
- Fatalities: 1
- Survivors: 0

On 29 June 2013, a Zlin Z 526 light aircraft crashed during an unauthorized aerobatics display near Eberswalde Finow Airfield in Germany. The pilot was fatally injured.

== Accident ==
Photograph of the aircraft approaching from the east for an inverted low pass

Photograph of the aircraft upon the engine losing power and pilot attempting to roll out of inverted flight

Photograph of the aircraft losing altitude and beginning to veer to the right

The Roadrunner's Paradise Race 61 festival was taking place at the Luftfahrtmuseum Finowfurt (Finowfurt Aviation Museum), next to Eberswalde Finow Airfield. The pilot involved made an unauthorized demonstration flight.

The aircraft took off from runway 10 at Eberswalde Finow Airfield shortly after 12:04. After takeoff, the pilot flew to the festival site and then made several low passes. On the final pass, the aircraft made a low inverted pass from an easterly direction. During this manoeuvre, the engine lost power. The pilot attempted to roll the aircraft upright, but the right wing tip tank collided with the ground. This reversed the roll and the aircraft crashed upside down. There was no fire except for a brief flash as the right wing tip fuel tank was ruptured on initial impact.

The crash destroyed the aircraft and fatally injured the pilot. The aircraft crashed into the Solarpark Finow Tower, destroying a number of solar panels. No one on the ground was injured in the incident.

== Aircraft ==
The Zlin 526 is a low wing single-seat aerobatic aeroplane powered by a 180 hp Avia M 137 6-cylinder in-line engine. The involved aeroplane, serial number 1119, was made in 1967. It was bought by the German pilot in the Czech Republic on 29 March 2013.

The fuel system of the Zlin is optimised for aerobatics. It consists of a fuel tank in each wing feeding by gravity a 5 L (1.3 US gal) collector tank in the fuselage. A fuel pump draws fuel from the collector tank and supplies fuel - via filters - to the fuel injection pump, which in turn delivers fuel via separate lines to each of the engine's six cylinders. During inverted flight, the collector tank receives no fuel from the wing tanks, and a one-way check valve ensures the collector tank's fuel does not flow to the wing tanks. The aircraft involved in this accident was fitted with optional wing tip tanks.

As of 24 November 2012 the aircraft had accumulated 3,284:19 operating hours and 18,243 flight cycles.

== Investigation ==
The German Federal Bureau of Aircraft Accident Investigation (BFU) investigated the accident. The investigation revealed that on the day of the crash, the aircraft did not have a valid registration: the purchase contract required the aircraft to be promptly deleted from the Czech register. Furthermore, the liability insurance policy had ended on 1 May 2013.

According to BFU, the 47-year-old crash pilot held a valid Private Pilot's License (PPL) and was rated as Pilot in Command (PIC) for Single Engine Piston land (SEP land). His license also had entries for aerobatics and night flight qualifications. The pilot had a valid class 2 medical certificate.

The pilot had accumulated 3,127:55 hours and 10,445 flight cycles as per last logbook entry 13 October 2012.

The investigation further found that:

- the aerobatics display was performed without permission from the responsible authority
- exemption for aerobatics below 1,500 ft (460 m) had not been granted
- the inverted low pass was conducted at a height of 20–50 m (66–164 ft) and some 20 m (66 ft) in front of the spectators
- the right wing tank was undamaged and contained a low amount of fuel. The left wing tank and both tip tanks were destroyed
- the collector tank was undamaged and empty
- only cylinder one's fuel injector line contained fuel, and only a small amount. The other five fuel injector lines were dry
- the aircraft had been supplied with motor fuel and not Avgas as required
- the engine was deemed in good technical condition
- the aircraft was not certified for aerobatics as wing tip tanks were installed
- the pilot did not wear a parachute - instead, the seat had been filled with foam
- control input by the pilot resulted in the aircraft veering off to the right in a nose-down attitude of 5-20 degrees during the unsuccessful recovery

== Causes ==
BFU concluded that engine performance was impaired due to lack of fuel during inverted flight. Subsequent errors in control inputs by the pilot during the roll back to normal flight attitude resulted in the collision with solar panels and, subsequently, the ground.

They further stated that the pilot's decision to conduct aerobatics in close proximity to the ground contributed to the accident.
