= 2021 Punta Caucedo Gulfstream G-IVSP crash =

2021 aviation accident in Santo Domingo

Coordinates: 18°30′N 69°59′W

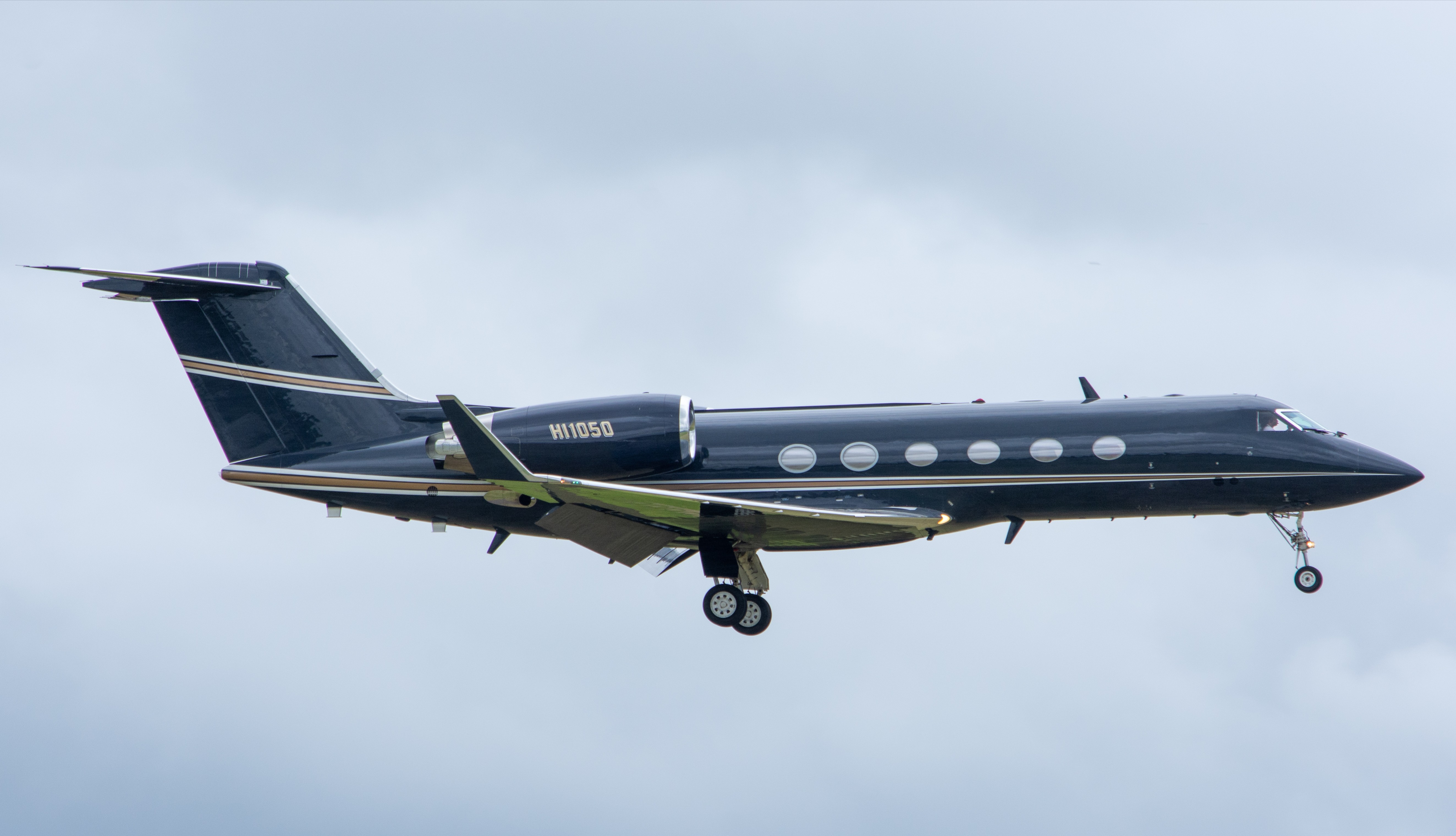
- HI1050, the aircraft involved in the accident, seen in 2019

Accident
- Date: 15 December 2021
- Summary: Crashed shortly after takeoff, under investigation
- Site: Las Américas International Airport, Punta Caucedo, Santo Domingo, Dominican Republic

Aircraft
- Aircraft type: Gulfstream G-IVSP
- Operator: Helidosa Aviation Group
- Registration: HI1050
- Flight origin: La Isabela International Airport, Dominican Republic
- Stopover: Orlando International Airport, United States
- Destination: Appleton International Airport, United States
- Occupants: 9
- Passengers: 6
- Crew: 3
- Fatalities: 9
- Survivors: 0

The 2021 Punta Caucedo Gulfstream G-IVSP crash occurred on 15 December 2021, involving a private flight operated by the Dominican company Helidosa Aviation Group. The aircraft departed from Joaquin Balaguer International Airport in Santo Domingo, Dominican Republic, bound for Orlando International Airport, Florida, United States. Approximately 16 minutes after takeoff, it crashed near Las Américas International Airport, Punta Caucedo, Santo Domingo, Dominican Republic. All nine occupants aboard—three crew members and six passengers—were killed, including Puerto Rican music producer José Ángel Hernández, professionally known as Flow La Movie.

== Aircraft ==
The aircraft involved was a Gulfstream G-IVSP, manufactured in 2002 with serial number 1482. This model typically accommodates between 14 and 19 passengers.

== Accident ==
According to data from Flightradar24, on December 15, 2021, a Gulfstream IV registered as HI1050, departed Joaquín Balaguer International Airport in northern Santo Domingo at 17:08 local time (21:08 UTC), enroute to Orlando, Florida.

According to preliminary reports, during the initial climb and while making a left turn, the pilot reported an unspecified issue and requested an emergency diversion to Las Américas International Airport. After completing a full 360-degree turn at approximately 1,600 feet, the aircraft reached a maximum altitude of 1,825 feet, continuing briefly over the sea near the coast before attempting alignment with runway 35 from the left. Shortly thereafter, the aircraft crashed on the airport grounds, igniting a fire that destroyed the wreckage and resulted in the immediate deaths of all nine occupants. There were no survivors.

The accident caused the closure of Las Americas airport for just over two hours, forcing the cancellation of one flight, the diversion of nine passenger flights and one cargo flight and delays in the take-off of nine other flights, according to several media reports.

== Victims ==
All nine occupants aboard the aircraft died in the crash, likely due to impact and the ensuing fire. The passengers consisted of six U.S. nationals, including two children. The flight crew comprised a Venezuelan captain and two Dominican nationals serving as first officer and flight attendant.

Among those aboard was Puerto Rican music producer José Ángel Hernández, professionally known as "Flow La Movie." Hernández was traveling with his wife and two of his three children. He was a music producer recognized for his contributions to the urban music genre. He notably produced the song "Te Boté," performed by Bad Bunny, which remained at number one on Billboard's Hot Latin Songs chart for 14 consecutive weeks in 2018.

The flight attendant, Verónica Estrella, was the niece of Eduardo Estrella, President of the Senate of the Dominican Republic. The flight was her first as a cabin crew member, having resigned from her position at the Ministry of the Environment the previous day.

The names of the deceased are:

- Crew
- Pilot, Luis Alberto Eljuri (age 47)
- Copilot, Víctor Emilio Herrera (age 26)
- Flight Attendant, Veronica Estrella (age 26)
- Passengers
- Debbie Von Marie Jiménez García (age 31)
- José Ángel Hernández (age 36)
- Kellyan Hernández Pena (age 21)
- Jayden Hernández (age 4)
- Yeilianys Jeishlimar Meléndez Jiménez(age 18)
- Jassiel Yabdiel Silva(age 13)

== Reactions ==
Following the crash, several public figures expressed condolences on social media. Artist J Balvin wrote, "José Ángel, thank you for your vibe always high!!! Rest in peace." Bryant Myers commented, "Ta cabrón lo delicada que es la vida, que triste noticia del broder @flowlamovie y su familia." Other artists, including Natti Natasha, Bad Bunny, Nio García, and Casper Mágico, also shared messages of sympathy.

Helidosa Aviation Group issued a public statement following the crash, expressing condolences and support for the victims' families. The company stated that the incident caused "great pain and regret," and called for solidarity with the affected families. The statement also included a religious appeal, asking for strength for the families and peace for the deceased.

== Investigation ==
The Civil Aviation Board (Junta de Aviación Civil, JAC) announced that the investigation into the crash was conducted in accordance with the provisions of Law 491-06 on Civil Aviation of the Dominican Republic.

=== Preliminary Findings and Facts ===
A little over a month after the accident, the Civil Aviation Board of the Dominican Republic released a preliminary report of the investigation into the December 15, 2021 crash of a Gulfstream GIV-SP operated by Helidosa Aviation Group.

On the day of the accident, the aircraft arrived at Joaquín Balaguer International Airport at 12:35 local time following a flight from San Juan, Puerto Rico. It was subsequently towed to Helidosa Aviation Group's hangar for maintenance. According to reports, maintenance personnel worked for approximately three hours to replace the ground spoiler actuators on the aircraft's right wing.

Following the maintenance, the aircraft was towed back to the tarmac in preparation for its scheduled flight to Orlando, Florida, United States. Closed-circuit television (CCTV) footage reviewed during the investigation showed the flight crew conducting a flight control check. During this check, the spoilers on both wings were extended; however, only those on the left wing were observed to retract. The aircraft subsequently taxied for takeoff with all three spoilers on the right wing remaining extended.

Shortly after takeoff, the aircraft experienced flight control difficulties. The flight crew declared an emergency and initially requested vectors to return to the departure airport. As the situation developed, they opted to divert to Las Américas International Airport, where they were cleared to land on runway 35. During the final approach, the aircraft struck trees and subsequently impacted the ground approximately 200 meters to the right of the runway. The total duration of the flight was approximately 16 minutes.

The report revealed that the primary cause was a maintenance error in which hydraulic lines for the right-wing ground spoiler actuators were incorrectly connected, resulting in asymmetrical spoiler deployment during flight. This malfunction created severe aerodynamic instability, rendering the aircraft uncontrollable, particularly during the critical low-speed approach phase of an emergency landing. Despite the crew's efforts to manage the situation and safely land the aircraft, the imbalance caused a loss of control, leading to the fatal crash. Contributing factors included inadequate maintenance procedures and potential distractions from repeated communications with ground staff during the emergency. To address the root cause, the aircraft manufacturer implemented design modifications to the hydraulic connections to prevent similar errors and issued procedural recommendations to improve maintenance practices.

== See also ==
- Aaliyah
- Colin McRae
- Fernando Martin
- Dražen Petrović
