= 1988 Botswana Government BAe-125 attempted shootdown =

1988 attempted aircraft shootdown in Angola

1988 Botswana Government BAe-125 attempted shootdwon
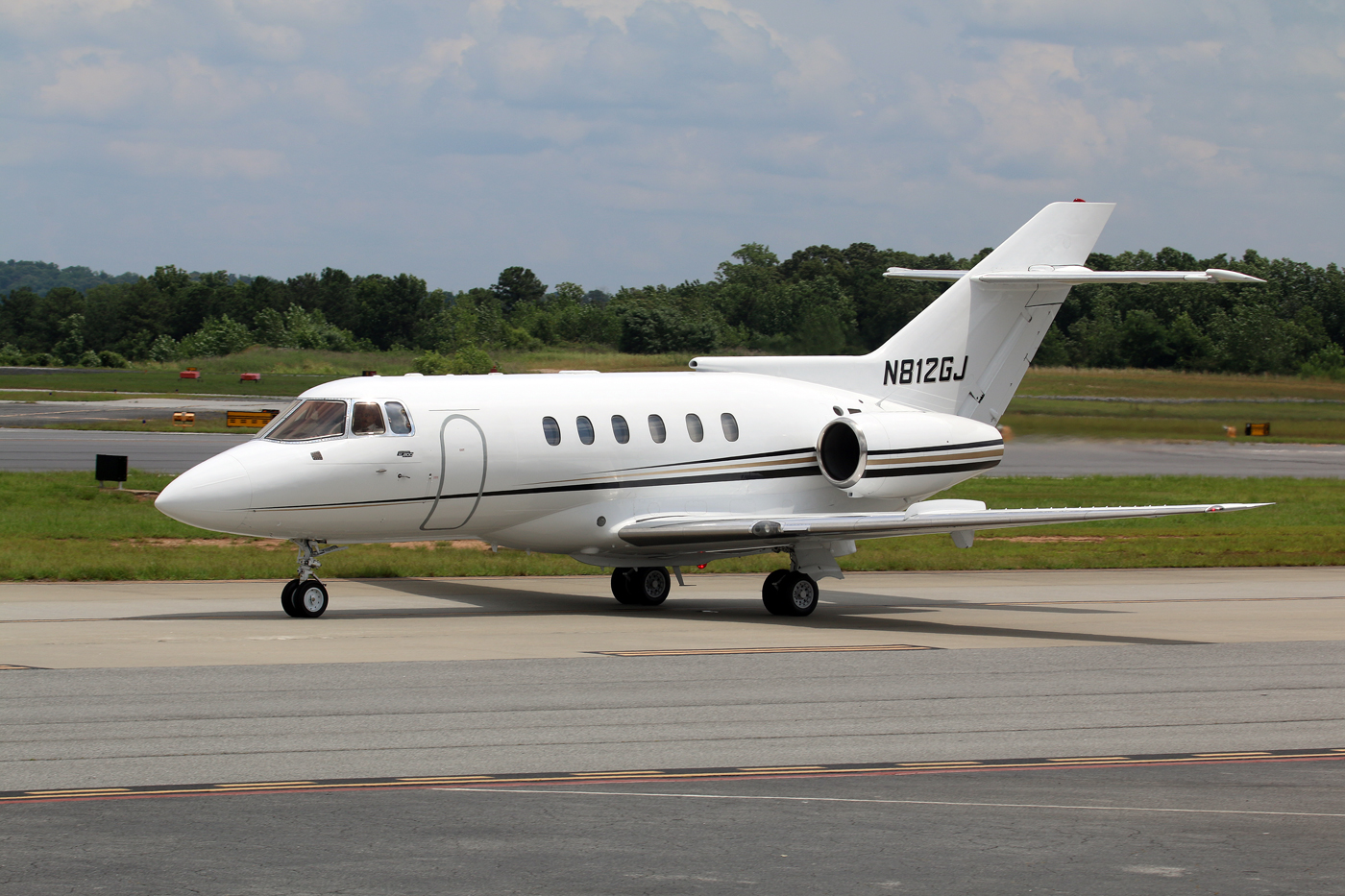
- The aircraft involved, pictured in 2015 under a new registration

Attempted shootdown
- Date: 7 September 1988
- Summary: Attacked by an Angolan MiG-23
- Site: Near Cuíto, Bié Province, Angola

Aircraft
- Aircraft type: British Aerospace BAe-125-800A
- Operator: Government of Botswana
- Registration: OK-1
- Flight origin: Sir Seretse Khama International Airport, Gaborone, Botswana
- Destination: Quatro de Fevereiro Airport, Luanda, Angola
- Occupants: 10
- Passengers: 8
- Crew: 2
- Fatalities: 0
- Injuries: 4
- Survivors: 10

On 7 August 1988, the British Aerospace BAe-125-800A presidential plane of Government of Botswana was attacked by an Air Force of Angola MiG-23 fighter jet, as it was flying from Sir Seretse Khama International Airport, Gaborone, Botswana, to Quatro de Fevereiro Airport, Luanda, Angola. The plane then made an emergency landing at an airstrip in Cuíto, Angola. All ten people on board, including Botswana president Quett Masire, survived. Angolan government later admitted to have attacked the plane after mistaking it for an enemy aircraft.

== Background ==
=== Political situation ===
At the time the Angolan Civil War was ongoing. During the conflict aircraft shootdowns were common, both by the UNITA militias and Angolan government, with both factions trying to cut the aerial supplies of the other. At the time the Air Force of Angola deployed a fleet of MiG-23 fighters to patrol the southern portion of the country's airspace.

=== Aircraft ===
The aircraft involved in the occurrence was the presidential plane of Botswana (registration OK-1), at the time a British Aerospace BAe-125-800A manufactured in 1988. The plane was recently purchased by the government to end the dependency from the airline South African Charters, from which they leased the aircraft previously. After the attack the plane was repaired and returned to service with another operator, since the Government of Botswana decided to purchase a Gulfstream IV as the new presidential plane after the incident.

=== Occupants ===
The aircraft was carrying ten people, eight passengers and two crew members. The two crew were pilot in command Colonel Albert Scheefers, a pilot of the Botswana Defence Force Air Wing, and captain Arthur Rickets, who was acting as the first officer. The aircraft was carrying president of Botswana Quett Masire to the Southern African Development Coordinating Conference in Luanda, Angola. Other passengers included motswana diplomat Archibald Mogwe, protocol chief Bashi Ikitseng, the then Minister of Presidential Affairs and Public Administration Ponatshego Kedikilwe, president's secretary Mogolori Modisi and journalist Douglas Tsiako.

== Incident ==
The aircraft took off from Sir Seretse Khama International Airport, Gaborone, Botswana, headed to Quatro de Fevereiro Airport, Luanda, Angola. Take off and climb went uneventful. As the aircraft was flying at flight level FL350 over southern Angola, and was transitioning from the airspace under the Cuíto air traffic control coordination to the one under the Luanda air traffic control, it was intercepted by a MiG-23 fighter jet of the Air Force of Angola. The fighter jet, whose pilot misidentified the BAe-125 as an enemy aircraft, fired two R-60 missiles at the presidential plane, with the first hitting engine number two and causing it to detach, and the second hitting the falling engine. The shrapnel blown by the missile explosion also shattered a window, causing an explosive decompression, and damaged the airplane's fuel tanks, causing a leak. Inside the plane shrapnel and debris injured president Masire lightly and chief Ikitseng more seriously. The force of the impact also threw a cabin engineer against Captain Scheefers, incapacitating the latter. First officer Rickets took control of the plane and started a diversion towards an airstrip near the city of Cuíto, Bié Province, Angola. During the descent the remaining parts of the engine detached, but a safe emergency landing was still carried out. After landing the injured were taken to the local hospital where they were treated by Cuban doctors stationed there during the civil war.

== Investigation ==
Three days after the incident the Government of Angola admitted its responsibility and stated that the aircraft was attacked after being mistaken for an enemy aircraft. An joint investigation, by authorities of both Angola and Botswana, into the occurrence was announced. The Angolan Government then stated that the most probable cause of the accident was a communication error with the fighter jet.

=== Conspiracy theories ===
Alternative theories, that were labelled as conspiracy theories by the angolan authorities, suggest that the Air Force of Angola deliberately attacked the airplane as a threat towards Botswana to force it to cut ties with the United States, who were supporting the UNITA rebels in the ongoing civil war. Some also report, as support for the intentional shootdown theory, that four additional missiles were fired from the ground, but all missed the plane.

== Aftermath ==
The motswana delegation was flown to Luanda, and then back to Gaborone, by the Angola's president, José Eduardo dos Santos, executive Gulfstream III aircraft.

Even after the official acknowledgement by the Government of Angola of its responsibility in the attack, and the reparation flight offered to the motswana delegation, relations between Angola and Botswana remained tense in the years following the incident.
