= Solarpark Finow Tower =

Photovoltaic park in Brandenburg, Germany

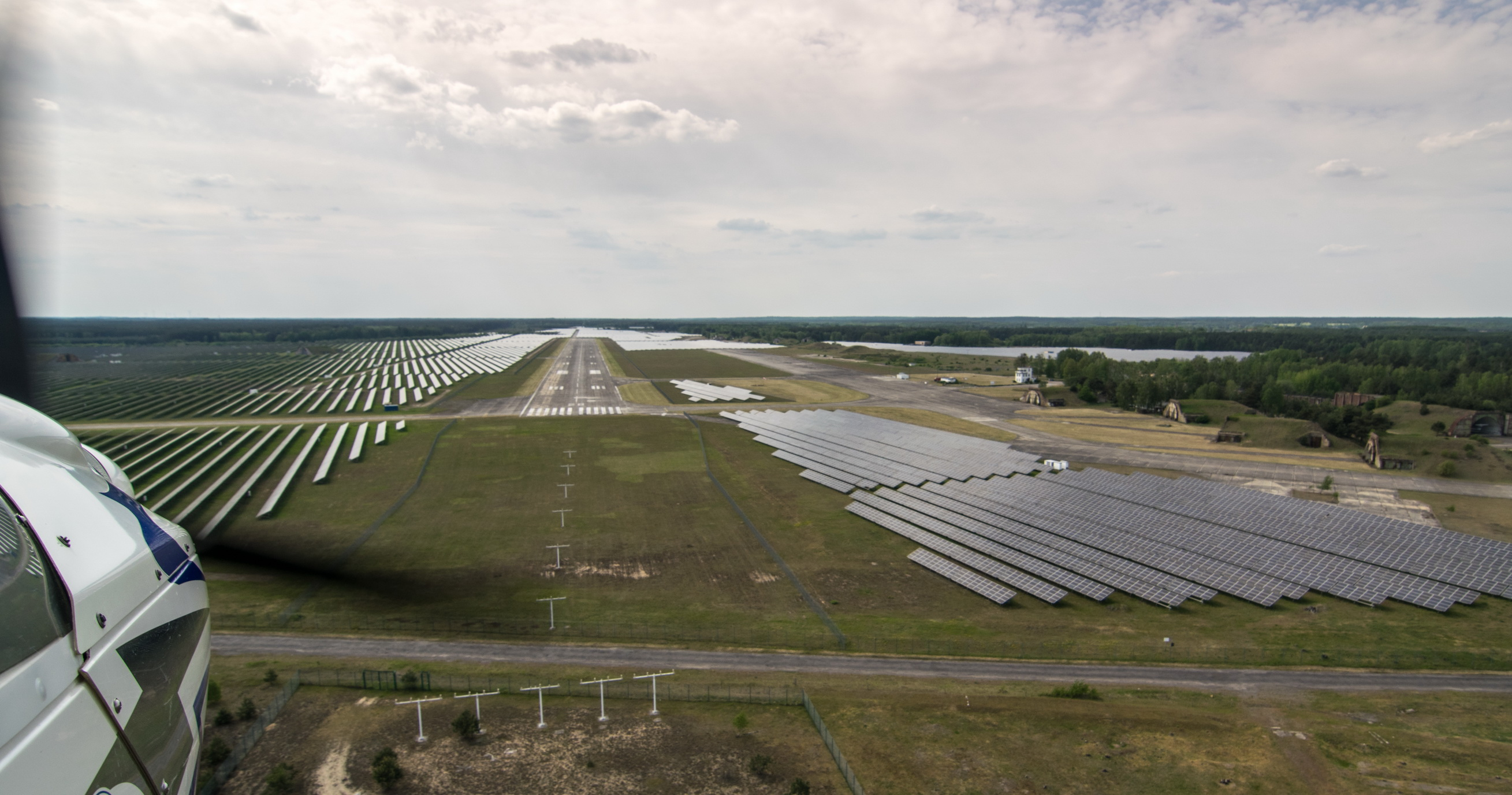
- Country: Germany
- Location: Eberswalde, Brandenburg
- Coordinates: 52°49′31″N 13°41′54″E
- Status: Operational
- Commission date: 2010, 2011

Solar farm
- Type: Flat-panel PV

Power generation
- Units operational: 317,880
- Nameplate capacity: 84.7 MW
- Annual net output: 82 GWh

Solarpark Finow Tower is located in Finowfurth, northeast of Berlin, Germany and is equipped with Suntech modules.

The first phase of the project, FinowTower I (24.3 MW) was commissioned in 2010, and the second, FinowTower II (60.4 MW) in 2011.

== See also ==
- Photovoltaic power stations
- List of largest power stations in the world
- List of photovoltaic power stations
