= 1985 Teterboro mid-air collision =

Aviation accident in Teterboro, New Jersey

Accident
- Date: November 10, 1985
- Summary: Mid-air collision
- Site: Teterboro, New Jersey; 40°48′58″N 73°59′54″W
- Total fatalities: 6
- Total injuries: 8 (on the ground)
- Total survivors: 0 (on planes)

First aircraft
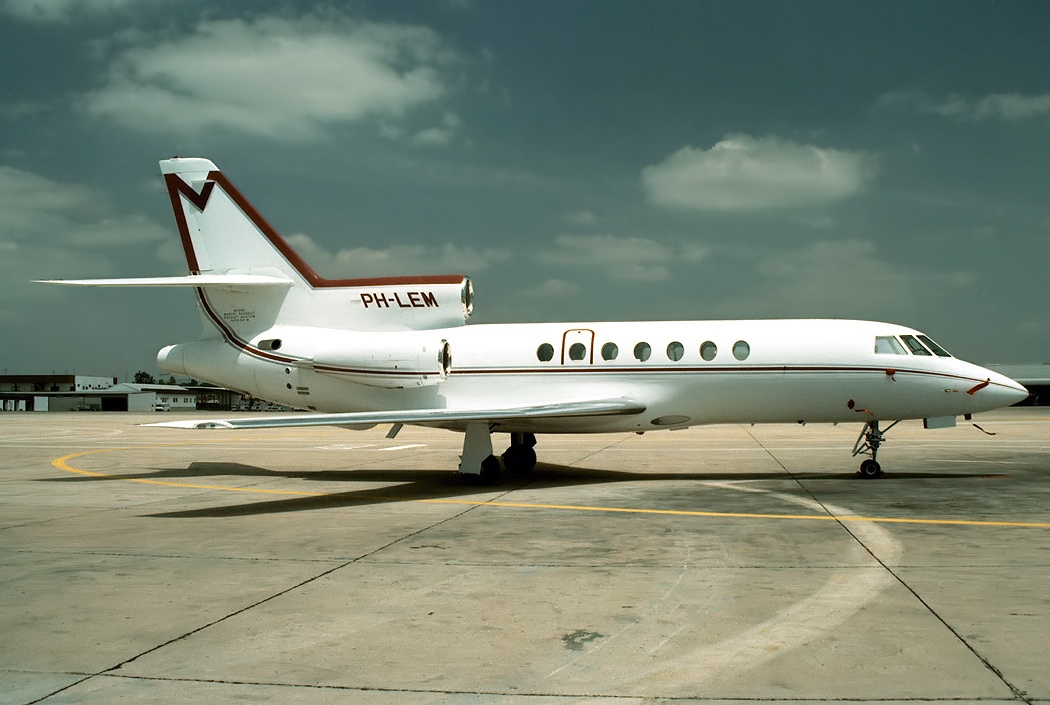
- a Dassault Falcon 50 similar to the one involved in the accident
- Type: Dassault Falcon 50
- Operator: Nabisco Brands Inc.
- Registration: N784B
- Flight origin: Morristown Municipal Airport, Morris County, New Jersey
- Destination: Teterboro Airport, Teterboro, New Jersey
- Passengers: 0
- Crew: 2
- Fatalities: 2
- Survivors: 0

Second aircraft
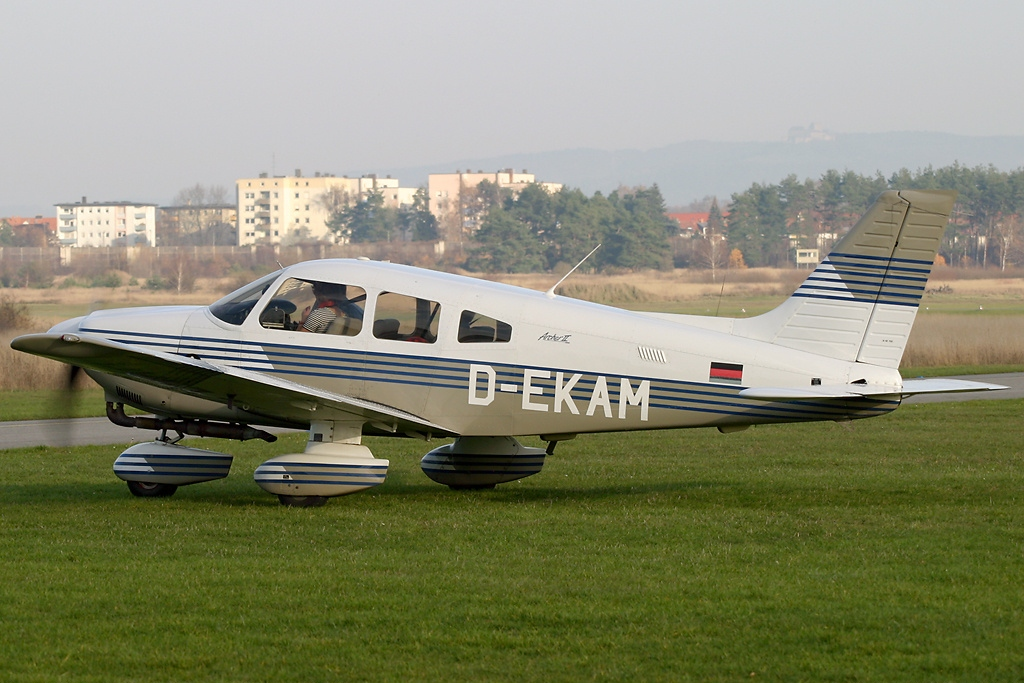
- a Piper PA-28 similar to the one involved in the accident
- Type: Piper PA-28-181 Archer
- Operator: Air Pegasus
- Registration: N1977H
- Passengers: 2
- Crew: 1
- Fatalities: 3
- Survivors: 0

Ground casualties
- Ground fatalities: 1
- Ground injuries: 8

On November 10, 1985, a Dassault Falcon 50 executive jet belonging to Nabisco Brands Inc. and a Piper Cherokee collided over Teterboro Airport in New Jersey. Six people died in the accident: all five aboard both aircraft and one person on the ground; another eight were injured.

== Accident ==
At approximately 5:22 p.m., the Dassault Falcon 50 and the Piper Cherokee collided as the jet approached for landing at Teterboro Airport and the Piper was flying over the airport on a west to east course. The Dassault was cleared for a standard instrument approach in visual meteorological conditions and made a left turn to position itself on the downwind leg to runway 19. The collision occurred at approximately 1,500 feet. The two aircraft fell into the residential areas of Fairview and Cliffside Park, New Jersey and the subsequent impact of the aircraft into neighborhood buildings caused fires and panic.

== Events following the Crash ==
During a news conference shortly after the accident, an official described the turn as an unusual course and speculated that the jet's pilot had previously reported a visual sighting of the Piper to the Teterboro tower just prior to the collision.

On the night of the collision three bodies - the pilot of the Piper, Marlon J. Moss (26), and the bodies of Henry Nocha Sr. and his wife, Lucia - were recovered from aboard the Cherokee and taken to Bergen County Morgue. Three further bodies were recovered amongst rubble during the day of the 11th, those of the pilots of the jet, Gregory L. Miller (37) and Alan K. Stitt (31), and the ground fatality Abdul Taha (34).

It was confirmed that two buildings had been leveled by the jet and subsequent outbreaks of fire had destroyed four more buildings before they could be put under control.

== Investigation ==
The National Transportation Safety Board investigation concluded the accident was caused by a breakdown in coordination among FAA air traffic controllers and the inability of the crew of the jet to see and avoid the other aircraft, because of misleading information from air traffic control and oncoming darkness. The NTSB recommended that the FAA improve communication procedures among controllers and provide training for its personnel at Teterboro to qualify the airport for an upgrade to a radar approach control system.

== See also ==
- 2009 Hudson River mid-air collision
- 1956 Grand Canyon mid-air collision
