= 2013 Florida Learjet 35 crash =

Aviation accident

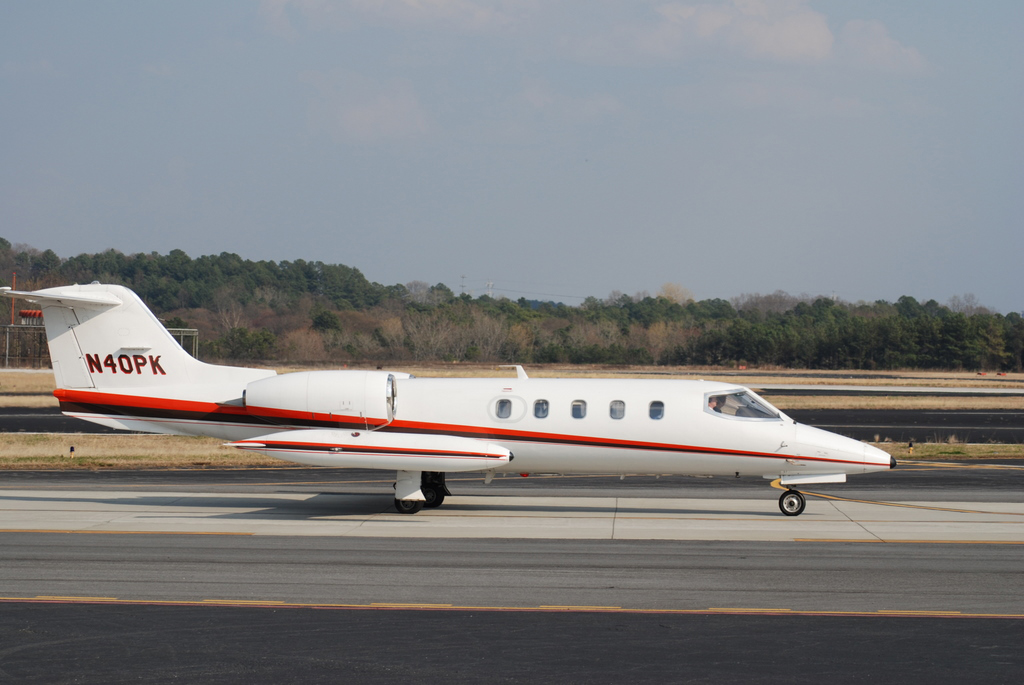
- A Learjet 35A similar to the aircraft involved

Accident
- Date: November 19, 2013
- Summary: Uncommanded thrust reverser deployment and pilot error due to lack of crew coordination and fraudulently certified first officer
- Site: Atlantic Ocean off Fort Lauderdale–Hollywood International Airport, Fort Lauderdale, Florida, United States; 26.163333°N 80.069442°W

Aircraft
- Aircraft type: Learjet 35A
- Operator: Aero JL SA de CV (operating as Air Evac International)
- Call sign: X-ray Alpha Uniform Sierra Delta
- Registration: XA-USD
- Flight origin: Juan Santamaría International Airport, San José, Costa Rica
- Stopover: Fort Lauderdale–Hollywood International Airport, Fort Lauderdale, Florida, United States
- Destination: Cozumel International Airport, Cozumel, Quintana Roo, Mexico
- Occupants: 4
- Passengers: 2
- Crew: 2
- Fatalities: 4
- Survivors: 0

On November 19, 2013, an Air Evac Learjet 35A crashed after take-off from Fort Lauderdale–Hollywood International Airport. The aircraft was performing a ferry flight from Fort Lauderdale to Cozumel International Airport in Mexico. All four occupants on board were killed.

== Aircraft and crew ==
The aircraft involved was a Learjet 35A that had first flown in 1979 and was powered by two Garrett TFE731 turbofan engines. It did not carry a flight data recorder (FDR), but it did carry a cockpit voice recorder (CVR). At the time of the accident, aircraft were only required to carry a 30-minute CVR, however the aircraft involved carried a two-hour CVR.

The captain was 62-year-old José Hiram Galván De Lao, who had a commercial pilots license from the Mexican Directorate General of Civil Aeronautics (DGAC) and was qualified to fly Learjet 20s and 30s (the Learjet 35 is part of the 30s family), the Grumman Gulfstream II, and helicopters. He had more than 10,000 hours of flight experience, including 1,400 hours on the Learjet 35.

The first officer was 26-year-old Josué Buendía Moreno, who also held a commercial pilot license from the DGAC as well as a private pilot license from the United States Federal Aviation Administration (FAA). He was far less experienced than captain Galván having logged only 206 flight hours, with just 29 of them on the Learjet 35. Both pilots had flown together three times before the accident.

== Accident ==
The aircraft conducted an air-ambulance flight from San Jose, Costa Rica, to Fort Lauderdale in the United States, after which the patient was transferred to a hospital in South Florida.

At 17:50:51 eastern standard time (EST), the CVR started recording. First officer Moreno contacted air traffic control (ATC) to have the flight plan issued. The clearance controller responded that even though the flight plan was in the system, it was too early to be issued. Moreno then mumbled to himself about the flight plan, and then he made several phone calls regarding the flight plan and departure time.

At 18:24 ATC issued the flight plan. At 19:12 multiple people were heard on the CVR. Contrary to the procedures, none of the aircraft's checklists were called used at any time during the flight.

The aircraft departed Runway 09R around 7:50 p.m. From ATC audio recordings, it is understood that the controller instructed the crew to climb and maintain 7,000 feet. The dispatcher understood that the crew wanted to return to the airport, which was confirmed by the first officer.

Later, the controller gave the command to "maintain four thousand. And turn left heading ah three three zero." The crew replied that this was not possible and that they were "going to do a one eighty". Around 7:51 p.m., the crew reported, "Mayday, mayday, mayday." The controller instructed the crew to turn left onto a 260 heading. The crew confirmed that they had received the information. The controller then told the crew to wait for the approach to runway 28R for landing and told the crew to turn left onto a 240 degree heading. At approximately 19:52, the controller again instructed the crew to turn left 240 degree heading, adding: "when you're able advise the airport in sight." But garbled transmissions from the crew seemed to indicate that this was not possible. At approximately 7:53 p.m., the controller suggested, "Can you make it to Fort Lauderdale Executive Airport?" At approximately 7:54 p.m., dispatch reported that Fort Lauderdale Airport was at "eleven o'clock eight miles". The aircraft descended through 900 feet and was able to turn towards the airport but could not arrest its descent and impacted the ocean approximately 1 mile offshore.

== Recovery ==
The United States Coast Guard found wreckage of the aircraft floating on the ocean surface the next day. The CVR was recovered on December 4. However, the main wreckage was located on December 4, 2014, more than a year after the accident.

== Investigation ==
The crash occurred in domestic waters, so the investigation was led by the National Transportation Safety Board (NTSB) with assistance from the Mexican Direction General of Civil Aeronautics (DGAC).

Aero JL records indicated that Moreno had been flying Learjet aircraft for the company since May 1, 2013, and at the time of the accident had a total of 1,243 flight hours. However, another document from the operator only revealed that Moreno had received a diploma for Learjet 25 series classroom training. The school he was trained at was not equipped with flight simulators nor any aircraft, nor was there any evidence from the school that they had trained Moreno on the Learjet, either in simulators or on the actual aircraft. Moreno had actually received his training from the operator. Furthermore, the NTSB did not find any licenses, logbook, certificates, nor DGAC records to support Aero JL's claims of Moreno having 1,243 flight hours. The DGAC recordings indicated Moreno only had a total of 206 flight hours. The DGAC had evaluated Moreno's performance on the Learjet only once, on May 2, 2013, and described his performance as poor. In summary, Moreno was not qualified to fly the Learjet 35.

The probable cause was determined to be deployment of the left engine thrust reverser by an unknown cause and failure of the flight crew to perform appropriate emergency procedures.
