= 1992 Gimli DHC-4 Caribou crash =

Aviation incident at Canadian airport

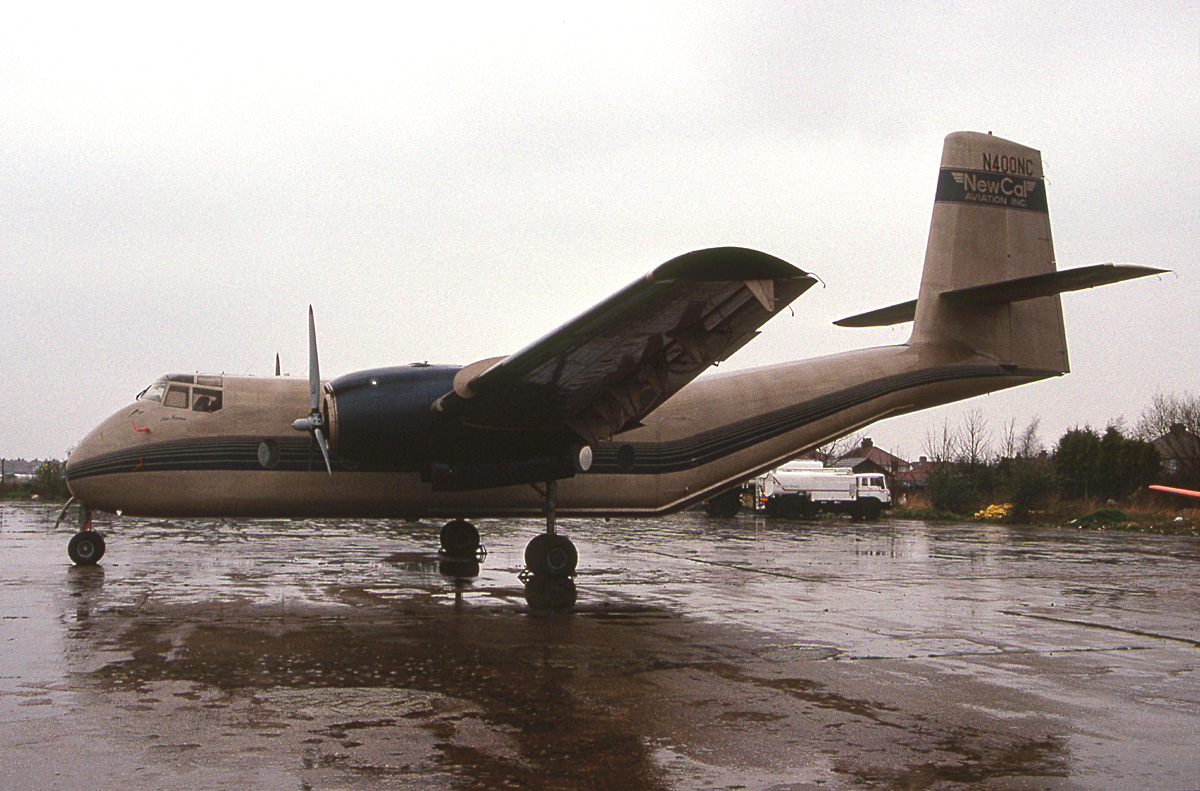
- N400NC, the aircraft involved in the accident

Accident
- Date: August 27, 1992
- Summary: Loss of control due to gust lock partial engagement
- Site: Gimli Industrial Park Airport, Gimli, Manitoba, Canada.; 50°38′00″N 97°02′52″W

Aircraft
- Aircraft type: Modified de Havilland Canada DHC-4A Caribou prototype conversion
- Operator: NewCal Aviation, Inc.
- Registration: N400NC
- Flight origin: Gimli Industrial Park Airport, Manitoba, Canada
- Destination: Gimli Industrial Park Airport, Manitoba, Canada
- Occupants: 3
- Crew: 3
- Fatalities: 3
- Survivors: 0

On August 27, 1992 a modified de Havilland Canada DHC-4A Caribou prototype conversion aircraft operated by NewCal Aviation, Inc., registration N400NC, crashed (TSB report number A92C0154) shortly after takeoff from Gimli Industrial Park Airport in Gimli, Manitoba. The aircraft was conducting an experimental test flight when it lost control and impacted the ground, killing all three crew members on board. The accident was attributed to the aircraft’s gust lock system not being fully disengaged before takeoff, which led to a loss of control in flight.

== Background ==
=== Aircraft ===
The aircraft was operating as an experimental aircraft as part of a modification program to convert the DHC-4A Caribou to Pratt & Whitney PT6A-67R turboprop engines, replacing the original R-2000-7M2 piston engines. Maintenance had also been undertaken on several parts replacing elevators and rudders. The modified DHC-4A had been taken for test flights a year earlier and was operating under the CAR 4b experimental restricted category. These tests highlighting the need for a replacement of the aircraft's mechanical vacuum pumps with a Bendix suction system, accompanied by in-line fuel booster pumps and a newly designed hydraulic pump.

=== Flight crew ===
The crew of three consisted of two pilots, Michael J. Quirk (43) and Perry Eugene Niforos (40), (Note: United Press International reported the age as 50.) and design supervisor and engineer, Gordon Hagel (27). (Note: United Press International reported the age as 28.) The crew was licensed to fly the DHC-4, however their experience with the specific turboprop modification was limited. Quirk, the pilot in command, had 4700 hours of flight time on this type of DHC-4. He had previously piloted a CV-7A in Vietnam, and later whilst serving for the United States Armed Forces at the Marshall Islands and finally whilst flying for Interocean Airways in Mozambique. The originally scheduled co-pilot, who had greater experience with piston DHC-4 aircraft, was substituted instead for Niforos, the son of the owner of NewCal Aviation Inc., who had less time with the aircraft with only 240 hours on this type, prior to takeoff. Investigators found that both Quirk and Niforos had limited experience individually for the flight of the aircraft. Hagel, working for Aero Consulting Services Ltd., was present evaluating the aircraft's fuel and hydraulic system modifications during the flight test.

== Accident ==
On the morning of August 27, 1992, the crew reportedly attended preflight briefings. The modified DHC-4A was lightly loaded at a mid center of gravity (C of G) position. Gordon Hagel, who was involved as design supervisor and engineer for NewCal Aviation, boarded the flight with pilot in command Quirk and co-pilot Niforos to record test flight performance results of both the modified fuel pump and hydraulic systems. In-flight checks were to be undertaken to include simulated failures of both wing fuel pumps and in-line pumps, to assess fuel pressure response.

Photograph of wreckage published in Stonewall Argus And Teulon Times.

The crew and aircraft taxied for takeoff at runway 14 at Gimli Industrial Park Airport. Engine power and brakes were applied, and control of the aircraft was maintained for approximately 900 feet before takeoff. After lift-off, the aircraft entered an unusually steep climb, caused by the aircraft's pitch attitude increasing to a position higher than what had been observed on previous test flight takeoffs. This was confirmed later by video footage. A subsequent pitch-up movement was made at 35 feet above ground level (agl), from which point elevator control surfaces remained at neutral. At approximately 200 feet agl, the aircraft rolled slowly to the right before abruptly pitching into a steep nose-down and crashing in a right-wing-low attitude. There was no explosion, however a post-impact fire, caused by on-board fuel igniting, destroyed most of the wreckage. None of the three crew members survived. Eyewitness accounts reported a fuel explosion that sounded "like a bomb went off". Footage of the aircraft taking off and subsequently crashing were recorded on amateur 8 mm video format videotape, which have been uploaded on websites such as YouTube.

This was the most fatal disaster of this aircraft type since November 10, 1987, where a De Havilland DHC-4 Caribou (C-GVYX) crashed near Ross River, Yukon during a single-engine go-around. This occurred after an oil leak led to the failure of the right engine. Both crew members lost their lives, while the two passengers survived.

== Investigation ==
The Transportation Safety Board of Canada (TSB) immediately opened an investigation into the crash. Initial inspection of the wreckage showed no indication of pre-flight issues with the propeller, engine, instrument and flight control systems. Slight performance issues were noted, and no stall was found to occur whilst the DHC-4 was in flight.

=== Gust lock system ===
The TSB discovered issues with the aircraft’s gust lock system during its inspection. Designed to prevent flight control surface movement on the ground, the gust lock secures the elevator, rudder, and ailerons while limiting throttle advancement. If engaged when controls are not neutral, they may lock later when passing through their neutral positions. The wreckage inspection revealed the elevator gust lock disengaged, the rudder gust lock engaged, and the aileron gust lock's position uncertain. This indicated the gust lock system was not fully disengaged, restricting flight controls and making the aircraft extremely difficult to control.

Further evidence was discovered when pilot-in-command Michael J. Quirk’s body was recovered, with the gust lock control handle embedded in his right wrist. The TSB concluded Quirk tried to operate the gust lock handle at the time of the impact. Portions of the gust lock handle assembly were recovered from the cockpit wreckage, exhibiting severe impact deformation and overload failure. Despite this, the gust lock lever was found in the fully disengaged position upon examination by the TSB, suggesting that the crew had attempted to release the system at some point before or during the flight.

=== Crew activity and control check ===
During the flight, the aircraft entered a gradually increasing nose-high attitude, which led to a steep dive. If Quirk or Niforos had been actively holding the throttle levers, they would likely have adjusted power to compensate for the extreme pitch changes. However, flight instrument data showed that both engines maintained a steady fuel flow of 740 pound per hour (pph), corresponding precisely to normal takeoff power. Since the engines were capable of operating at different power levels, this finding indicates that no throttle adjustments were made after takeoff, suggesting that neither pilot had their hand on the throttles during the flight.

The aircraft manual provides details on each flight control component, assuming they are correctly installed. Take-off checklist calls are done after engine run up, at which point a verification of flight control functionality would be confirmed prior to takeoff. However, the TSB reported that no such check was documented in available footage or witness accounts, which left uncertainty about whether it was conducted before the flight. If the flight controls had been locked or restricted due to a mechanical failure or system jamming, a proper control check would have identified the issue. Lacking these checks, the crew would not have been aware of any control limitations prior to takeoff.

=== Conclusions ===
TSB concluded their investigation with a summary of the crash outlining the issues with the gust lock system not being fully disengaged prior to flight, along with one or more of the gust lock pins re-engaging after lift-off. The cause for this remains inconclusive. They state that preflight control checks were not likely to have been completed prior to take-off and that once airborne, disengaging the gust lock mechanism became impossible, leading to complete loss of control.

Upon completion of the investigation, the TSB forwarded an Aviation Safety Advisory to Transport Canada regarding mandating pre-flight checklists and procedures ensuring aircraft gust lock disengagement. The aircraft's civil registration N400NC was cancelled on 7 July 1994, almost two years later.

PEN Turbo, a company setup after the crash to improve the Caribou, was named in recognition of Perry E. Niforos, using his initials. The company is still operational as of 2021.
