= 2010 Bimini Piper Pa-32 crash =

2010 Bahamian Aviation accident

2010 Bimini Piper Pa-32 Cherokee Six Crash
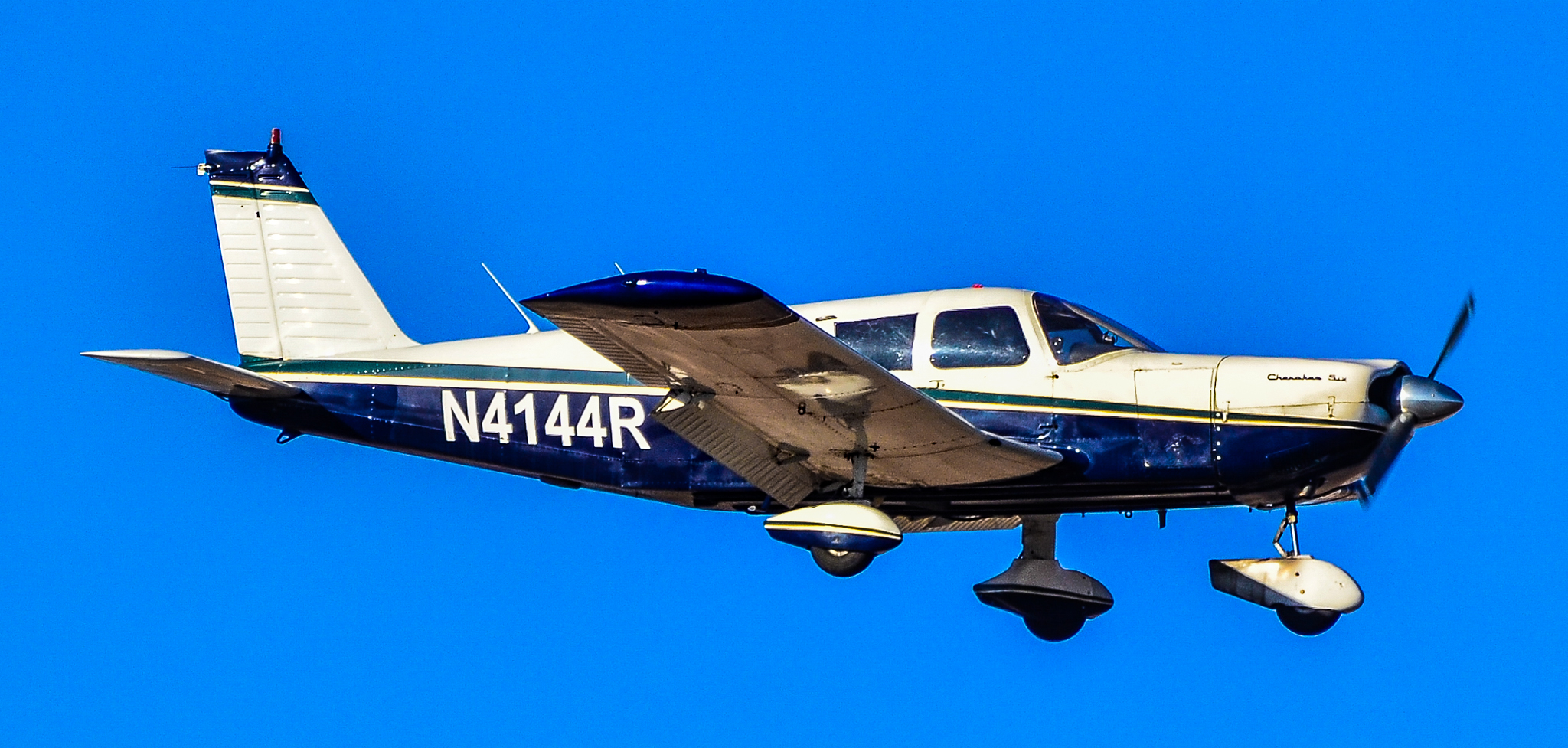
- A Piper PA-32-300 Cherokee Six similar to the one Involved

Accident
- Date: January 17, 2010
- Summary: Loss of Control due to the Pilot´s decision to fly into adverse weather.
- Site: 500 Yards North West of the Bimini Bay Resort, Bimini, Bahamas; 25°45′49″N 79°16′59″W
- Location of the Crash
- Total fatalities: 3

Aircraft
- Aircraft type: Piper PA-32-300 Cherokee Six
- Call sign: N4219R
- Registration: N4219R
- Flight origin: Lynden Pindling International Airport, Nassau, Bahamas
- Destination: Fort Lauderdale Executive Airport, Fort Lauderdale, United States
- Occupants: 3
- Fatalities: 3

On the 17th of January, 2010, a Piper Pa-32 Cherokee aircraft carrying 3 people crashed near the Bimini Bay Resort in the Bahamas while flying to Fort Lauderdale, Florida. All 3 occupants perished.

== Background ==
=== Aircraft & Pilot ===
The Aircraft was a Piper PA-32-300 Cherokee Six, registered N4219R, built in 1969. As of August 28, 2009, the aircraft had accumulated 7848 flight hours. The aircraft was piloted by 45 year old David Alan Howell, who was the owner of multiple furniture stores and had recently entered into real estate. Howell held a US Private Pilot Certificate issued on May 17, 2000. As of April 2008, Howell had a total of 386 flight hours with no recorded FAA Violations or Accidents. Howell was the owner of multiple furniture stores and had recently entered into real estate.

=== Occupants ===
Prior to the accident, Howell flew the plane with 4 passengers from Naples Municipal Airport to Great Harbour Cay Airport. These passengers included Howell's friends Andrew Peterson and J.P. Antonmattei, plus a married couple from Montreal. Antonmattei had just been named president of the Naples Area Board of Realtors. All 5 were involved in a real estate project in Cistern Cay. Before the accident flight, the investor couple decided to stay in Nassau, and the other three decided to cut the trip short and leave early.

=== Weather ===
A report from the Bahamas Meteorological Department indicated that a cold front in the northwest of the Bahamas was expected. The weather report showed also that "scattered to broken clouds 1,500 to 2,000 feet, scattered to broken clouds 4,000 to 5,000 merging with higher layers at 22,000 to 24,000 feet were forecasted", in addition to multiple isolated thundershowers, where visibility would be reduced to below 3 nautical miles. The Report also stated that "Moderate to Severe turbulence was reported in the vicinity of the towering cumulus and cumulonimbus cloud" and that the cloud ceiling would be below 1500 feet. According to the Final Accident report, residents of North Bimini reported that the weather near the crash site was bad with poor visibility and occasional rail showers.

== Accident ==
The aircraft departed Lynden Pindling International Airport at 14:49 Eastern Standard Time with 3 occupants operating under Visual Flight Rules. The flight time was estimated to be around 1 hour and 30 minutes for the direct flight between Nassau and Fort Lauderdale. The aircraft had been loaded with 37 gallons of Aviation gasoline giving it an estimated endurance of over 4 hours.

The aircraft climbed to its cruise altitude of 4500 feet and was expected to arrive at Fort Lauderdale at 16:19 EST. At 16:45, eyewitnesses reported that the aircraft had crashed near the Bimini Bay Resort in an area called "The Bluff". A joint search for the aircraft by the US Coast Guard and the Bahamas Air Sea Rescue Association (BARSA) then ensued, which located the aircraft shortly after the crash. All 3 occupants suffered fatal injuries.

== Investigation & Conclusions ==
Due to the location of the crash in a shallow area of water and the underwater currents nearby the distribution pattern of the wreckage could not be determined. After the crash, the aircraft wreckage was transported to Fort Pierce in Florida, where it was examined by Piper technicians.

=== Conclusions ===
The final report states that both the Pilot and the Aircraft were properly certified for the flight, and that there were "no airplane system or powerplant anomalies that contributed to the cause of the accident". The report also states that there is no evidence that the pilot received a weather briefing either before or during the flight. The probable cause according to the report is a Loss of Control caused by the Pilot's decision to fly into clearly identified thunderstorm activity. Contributing factors to the crash include:

- The Pilot's lack of training and certification to fly in non VFR conditions.
- The Pilot's failure to recover from an unusual flight attitude.
- The Pilot's poor decision making.
- The Pilot's failure to land in a nearby airport to wait for the adverse weather, in which he was not certified to fly, to pass.
- The Pilot's failure to assess the information concerning the weather activity in front of him. According to the Report: "There should have been ample information available from visual observations and other resources for the pilot to make a decision to delay the trip or make a landing in South Bimini to wait the passage of the cold front and or thunderstorms prior to continuing the flight".
