= Pilatus PC-6 Porter =

Swiss single engine STOL utility transport aircraft, 1959

PC-6 Porter/Turbo-Porter
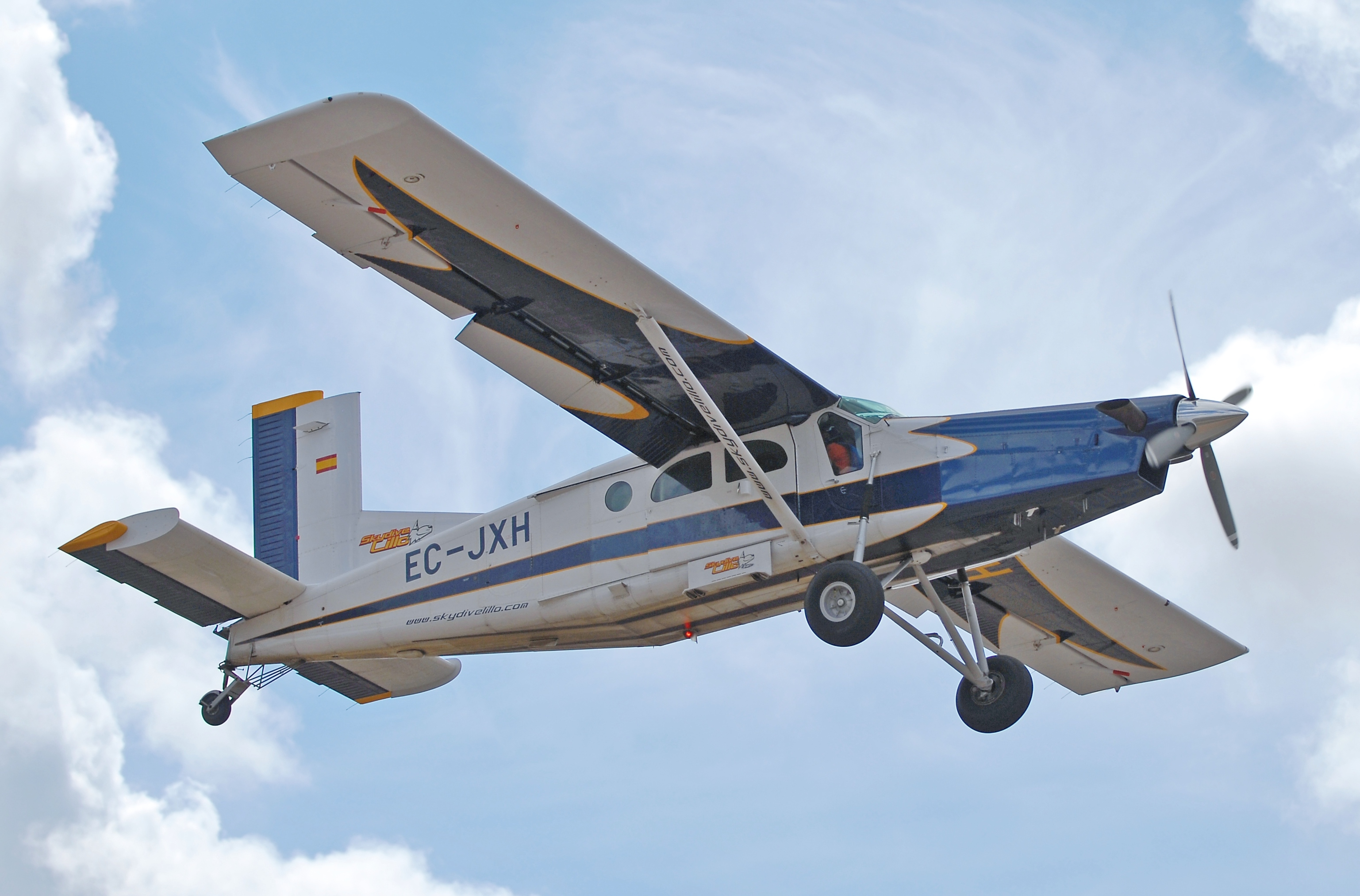
- A PC-6 Turbo-Porter, B2-H4 PT6A-34 variant, used for skydiving in Spain.

General information
- Type: STOL passenger and utility aircraft
- Manufacturer: Pilatus Aircraft; Fairchild Aircraft
- Status: In service
- Primary users: Civil aviation Austrian Air Force, Myanmar Air Force, Swiss Air Force
- Number built: 604

History
- Manufactured: 1959–2022
- First flight: Porter - 4 May 1959; Turbo-Porter - 2 May 1961
- Variant: Fairchild AU-23 Peacemaker

The Pilatus PC-6 Porter is a single-engined STOL utility aircraft designed by Pilatus Aircraft of Switzerland. First flown in 1959, the PC-6 was produced at Pilatus Flugzeugwerke in Stans, Switzerland. It has been built in both piston engine- and turboprop-powered versions, and was produced under license for a time by Fairchild Hiller in the United States. After 604 deliveries in 63 years, Pilatus ended production in 2022.

== Development ==
On 4 May 1959, the first prototype, powered by a 254 kW (340 shp) piston engine, made its maiden flight. In early May 1961, the first Turbo Porter, powered by a Turbomeca Astazou II turboprop engine, performed its initial flight. In comparison to its earlier piston engine-powered incarnation, the Astazou II-equipped Turbo Porter had an increased gross capacity and top speed, as well as benefitting from the engine's automatic handling functions. These benefits came at the expense of the greater initial purchase cost and higher fuel consumption. Both the piston and turbine-engine versions of the PC-6 became quickly known for their Short Takeoff and Landing (STOL) capabilities, requiring only a very short takeoff run before being ready for rotation prior to taking off. Its unit cost in 1962 was $55,000

The initial turbine-powered models of the PC-6 were equipped with the Astazou II powerplant; however, complaints on the reliability of this engine led to another early turboprop powerplant becoming available for the PC-6. This was the Garrett AiResearch TPE 331. Some operators such as Air America chose to retrofit their Astazou II-powered PC-6s with the TPE 331 engine. In May 1966, the first PC-6 to be equipped with the Pratt & Whitney Canada PT6A engine performed its maiden flight.

To offset rising labour and manufacturing costs in Switzerland, Pilatus distributed manufacturing work on the PC-6 to other countries; in 1993, Czech Republic–based Letov Kbely began manufacturing activity upon the type. Its unit cost in 2010 was $1,900,000. In 2013, Pilatus formed a joint venture with Beijing Tian Xing Jian Yu Science Co., Ltd. to locally manufacture the PC-6 and the newer Pilatus PC-12 in Chongqing, China; initially this facility performed subassembly work on the fuselage, and later other elements such as the wings and moving surfaces, which were transported to Pilatus' final assembly facility in Stans, Switzerland. Global production of the PC-6 will eventually be transferred to the Chongqing facility. On 11 December 2014, the first Chinese-assembled PC-6 fuselage was completed. In 2014, the majority of PC-6s delivered that year were to Chinese customers. By April 2016, around 20 PC-6s were in operation in the Chinese market; the type has often been used to replace the Antonov An-2, being reportedly cheaper to operate.

The Porter was also manufactured under license by Fairchild Hiller in the United States. Roughly 100 of these license-produced aircraft would be completed, being mainly purchased by civil operators within the US. A number of Fairchild Hiller-built PC-6s were also procured for military operations during the Vietnam War. It received the designation AU-23A Peacemaker for service with the US Air Force. The Peacemaker was fitted with a side-firing 20 mm XM-197 Gatling cannon, four wing pylons, and a centre fuselage station for external ordnance. However, the AU-23A proved to be troublesome in service. All of them were returned to the continental US and placed into storage after only a single year of operation. In 1979, a pair of UV-20s were assigned to the aviation detachment of the Berlin Brigade in Germany due to their suitability for operating within the heavily restricted airspace; they were fitted for carrying either cargo, up to eleven passengers, or three litters with four medical attendants.

After nearly 600 deliveries in six decades, including about 90 Fairchild-Hiller built and 425 PT6-powered, but only 52 in the last ten years, Pilatus will close the order book from summer 2018 and will roll off the last one in early 2019, while parts production will continue for at least 20 years. Due to pandemic delays, the last PC-6 Porter was instead delivered in December 2022 after 604 produced in 63 years.

== Design ==
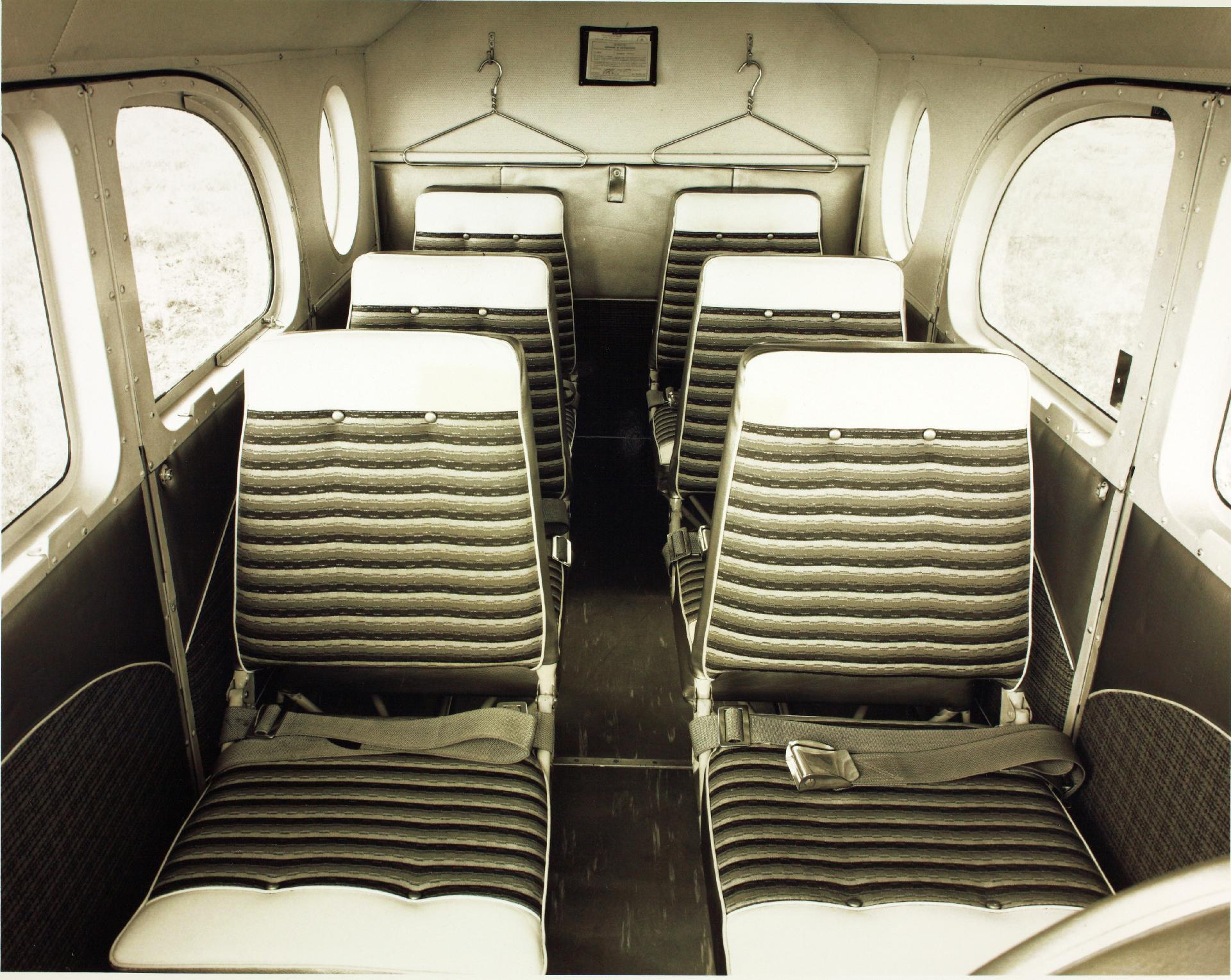
PC-6 cabin interior, circa 1960s

The Pilatus PC-6 Porter is a Short Takeoff and Landing (STOL) utility aircraft. The majority of aircraft are powered by a single Pratt & Whitney Canada PT6A turboprop engine, which drives a fully reversible, constant-speed, three-bladed HC-B3TN-3D (or an alternative four-bladed HC-D4N-3P) Hartzell aluminium propeller via a reduction gearbox. Pilatus claims that it possesses unique STOL capabilities, capable of landing in places only otherwise accessible by rotorcraft. It is fully capable of being operated from unprepared rough airstrips, in remote areas, hot climates and at high altitudes in all-weather conditions. In particular, the undercarriage employed provides for high wing and propeller clearances, making the PC-6 less susceptible to damage than conventional nosewheel-type undercarriages. For further landing versatility, various types of landing gear may be optionally installed allowing it to operate from different types of terrain; options include floats for water landings and skis for landing on snow.

Early models of the PC-6 were equipped with a full instrument panel as standard, and were reportedly easy for unfamiliar pilots to intuit. Later-manufactured PC-6s are equipped with a Garmin G950 glass cockpit in place of analogue instrumentation; the majority of earlier-produced PC-6s can also be retrofitted with a glass cockpit. In addition to its flight functionality, the G950 system acts as a remote maintenance unit and electronic flight bag all in one. Two large 10.4-inch liquid-crystal displays (LCDs) are present, functioning as the Primary Flight Display for all key flight information and the Multi-function Display for system/mission management. Fully independent secondary flight instrumentation is also provided to provide backup altitude, attitude, and airspeed information in the event of complete electrical failure. The cockpit has been designed for single pilot operations; additional flight controls for a co-pilot can be optionally fitted. Other optional features include an autopilot (capable of operating within all phases of flight), traffic collision avoidance system (TCAS), terrain awareness and warning system (TAWS), weather radar, satellite phone, LIDAR, forward-looking infrared (FLIR) and lightning detector; in addition, onboard electrical and avionics equipment are readily modifiable to conform with customer requirements.

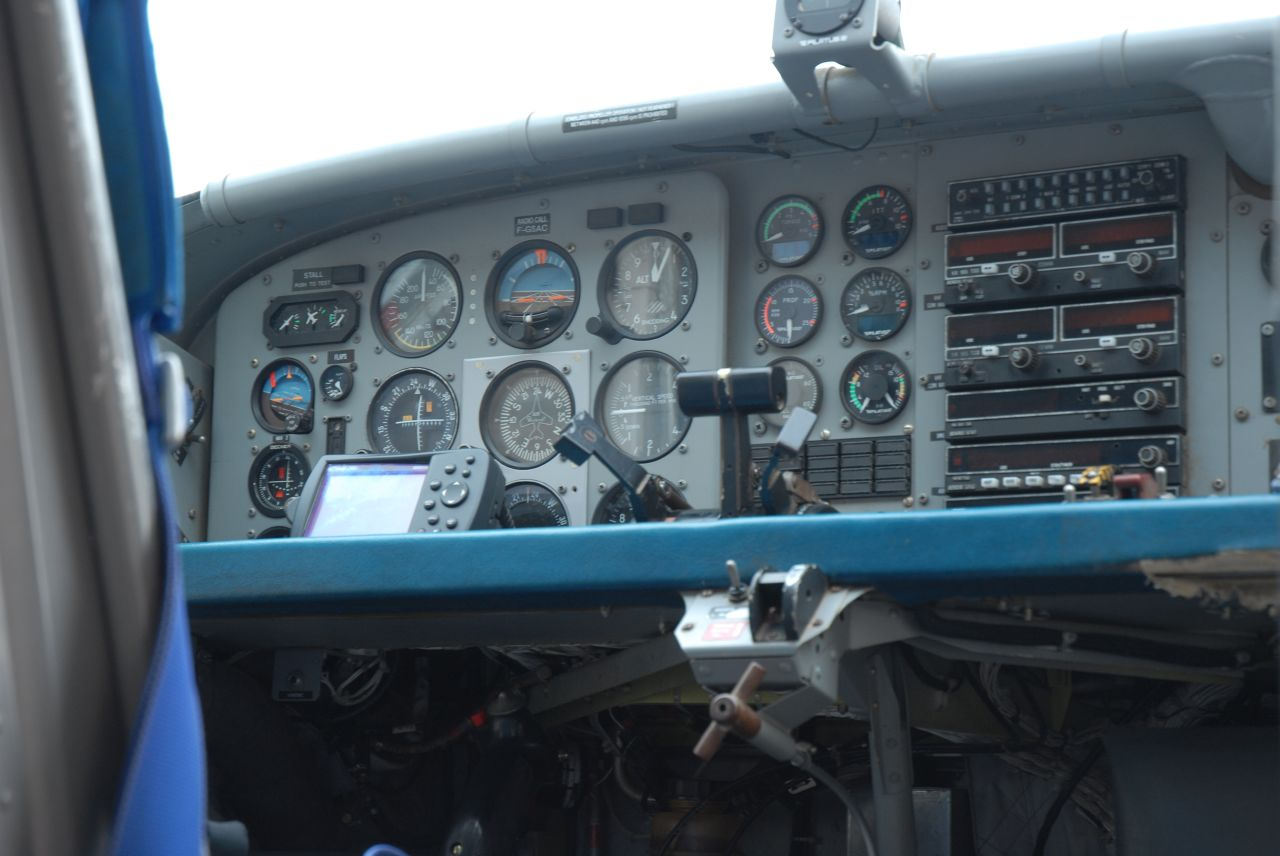
Analog cockpit instrumentation of a PC-6, 2007

The airframe is of a rugged and low-maintenance construction; featuring high levels of accessibility, interchangeability, and favourable manning levels. The wings, fuselage, and empennage are manufactured using conventional semi-monocoque construction techniques, the primary structure being composed of aluminium; the central structure retains critical strength despite the cutout areas for the sliding doors of the main cabin. Corrosion resistance is achieved via a combination of plating and a polyurethane-based enamel paint. The simple nature of the structure allows for ease of repair in the field. Features such as low-pressure tyres, twin-caliper disc brakes, and a highly energy-absorbent undercarriage enable the aircraft to be capable of operating from rough or otherwise challenging terrain.

For role flexibility, individual aircraft can be easily converted between various mission types, such as transport, paradrop, aerial photography, surveillance, air medical services and search and rescue duties. A maximum of ten passengers, or a 2,200 lb payload, may be carried within the aircraft's main cabin area within the rear section of the fuselage; the standard passenger seats are designed to allow for rapid removal and may be stowed within an optional separate externally-accessed seat stowage compartment behind the main cabin. The main cabin area is furnished with soundproofing measures, ventilation, and heating as standard. A maximum of three fuel tanks can also be carried in the main cabin, accordingly reducing payload capacity, to increase the aircraft's flight endurance. In addition to the large sliding doors at either side of the main cabin, separate hinged doors are present on either side of the cockpit; an optional pilot-controlled trapdoor, to accommodate supply drops or surveillance payloads, may also be installed in the center of the cabin floor without any design changes required. Additional equipment include a firefighting system, aerial application system, underwing tanks, sand filters, propeller de-icing system, mudguard, tailwheel debris guard, oxygen system, and additional power distribution system.

== Operational history ==
Slovenian Air Force Pilatus PC-6 STOL landing at the Murska Sobota Airfield

The PC-6 is noted for its Short Takeoff and Landing (STOL) performance on almost any type of terrain - it can take off within a distance of 640 feet (195 m) and land within a distance of 427 feet (130 m) while carrying a payload of 2,646 lbs (1,200 kg). Thanks to its STOL performance, the PC-6 holds the world record for highest landing by a fixed-wing aircraft, at 18,865 feet (5,750 m), on the Dhaulagiri glacier in Nepal.

Due to the type's favourable STOL characteristics, described by the magazine Flying as being "one of the most helicopter-like airplanes in terms of takeoff performance", Pilatus has deliberately marketed the PC-6 towards helicopter operators at times, feeling the type to be complementary to their typical mode of operation. According to Pilatus, the PC-6 can provide very similar surveillance capabilities to a rotorcraft at a significantly lower cost to operate and procure.

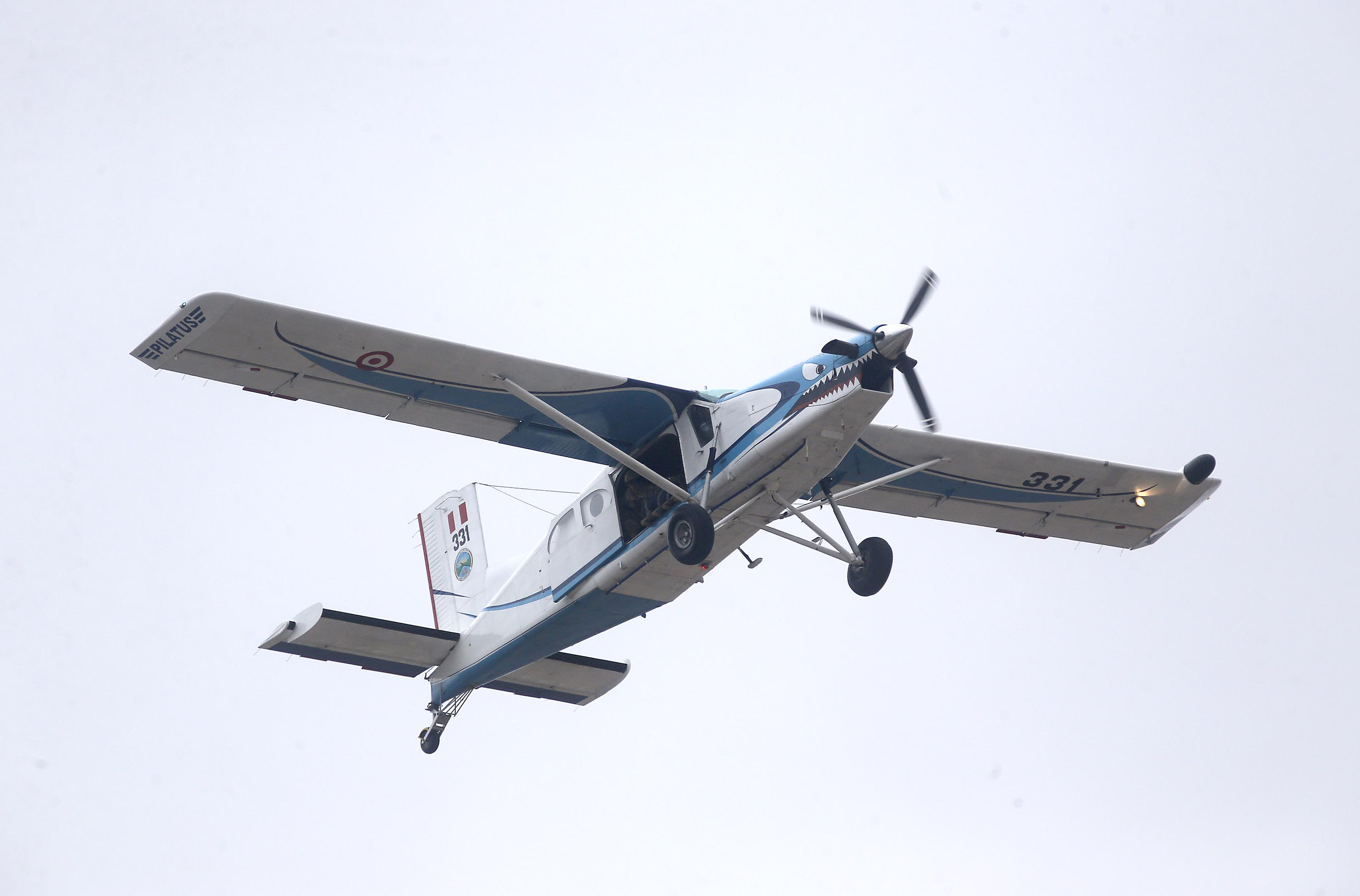
Peruvian Air Force PC-6, 2014

During its early service, the PC-6 Porter was noted for its high level of comfort and usability against competing aircraft. The type has also proven to have a long service life; by 1993, roughly 440 of the 500 PC-6 Turbo Porters completed by that point were still in service.

During the 1960s and 1970s, the Central Intelligence Agency-controlled airline Air America operated up to 23 PC-6s at a time. Many of these were operated in the South-East Asia region, including South Vietnam during the Vietnam War. The type was used for various missions, including paradropping supplies to troops, passenger transport, psychological warfare, reconnaissance, prisoner conveyance, airborne radio relay, and other intelligence operations.

Since 1976, the Austrian Air Force has operated a fleet of 12 PC-6 Porters as the mainstay of their fixed-wing transport fleet; the type has been used in various support roles, including transport, search and rescue, firefighting, observation, target-towing and paradropping.

According to Flying magazine, around 40 per cent of all PC-6s in use in Europe during the early 1990s were being used by skydivers.

In 1996, during the First Congo War, Zaire's president Mobutu Sese Seko hired Western European mercenaries (mostly French and Belgian) in an attempt to stop a Rwandan-led offensive. This contingent (part of the White Legion) was supported by a BAE Andover and a Pilatus PC-6B Turbo Porter transports and four Mil Mi-24 attack helicopters. The Porter was lost after colliding with a 3 metres (10 ft) tall anthill which damaged the plane's landing gear, causing it to crash-land just a few days after arriving in Zaire.

== Variants ==
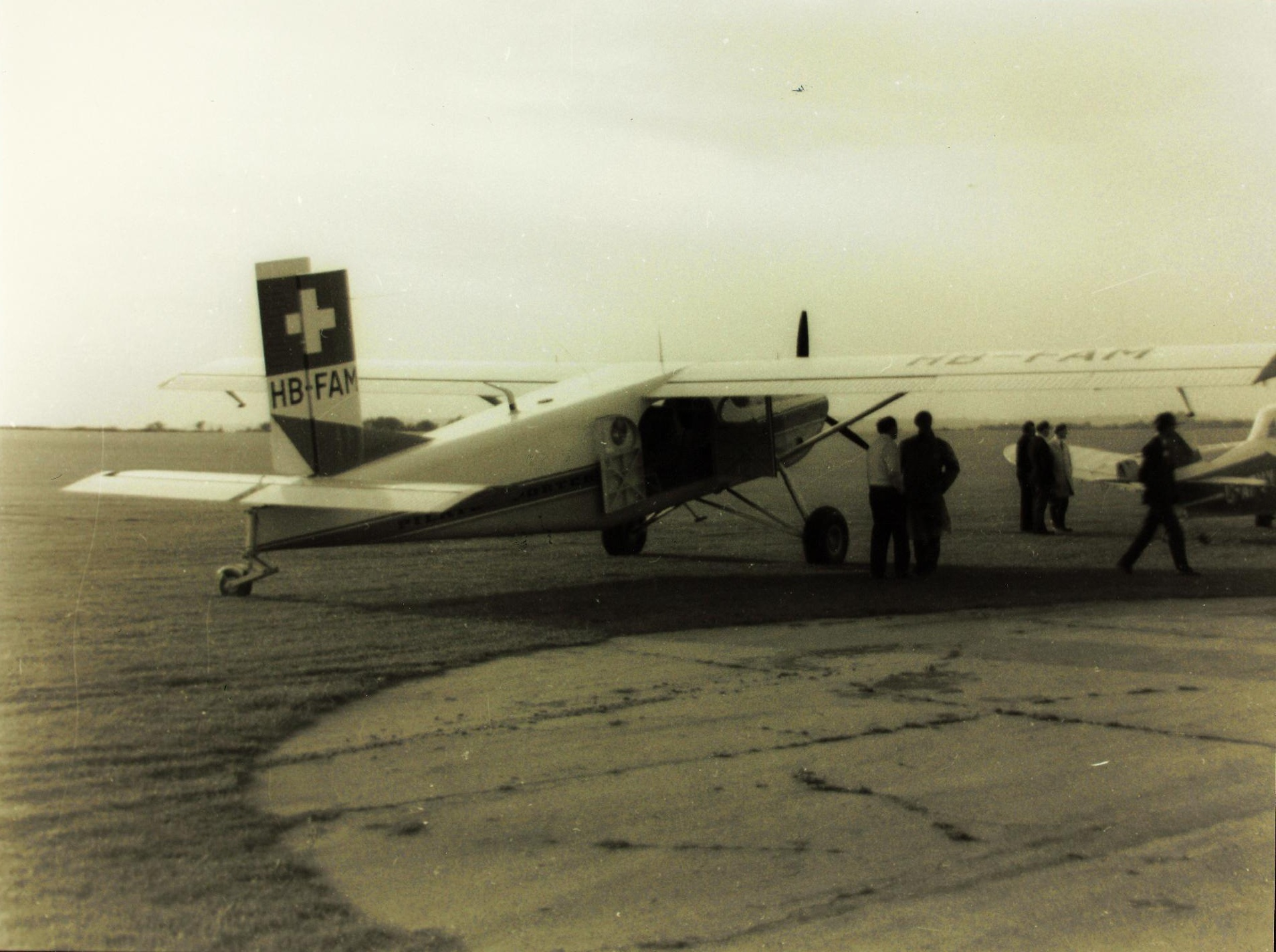
A PC-6/350 Porter

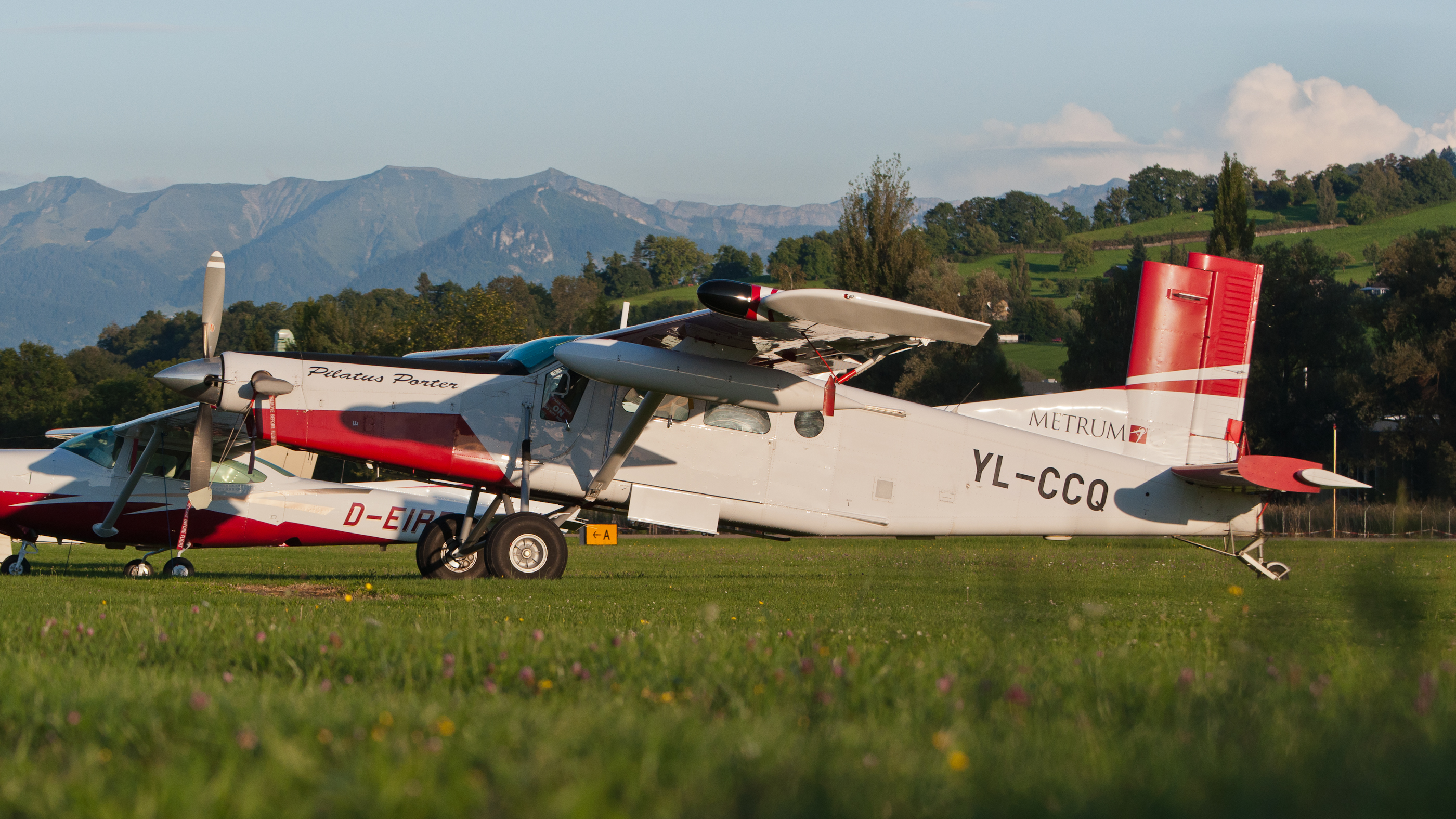
PC-6/B2-H4 Turbo-Porter. YL-CCQ is currently (2017) used by Skydive Estonia as a jump plane.

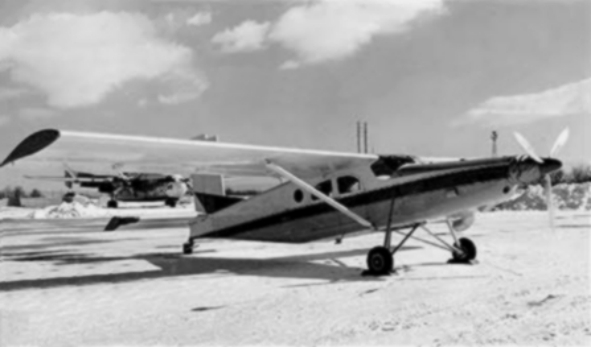
A Fairchild Porter

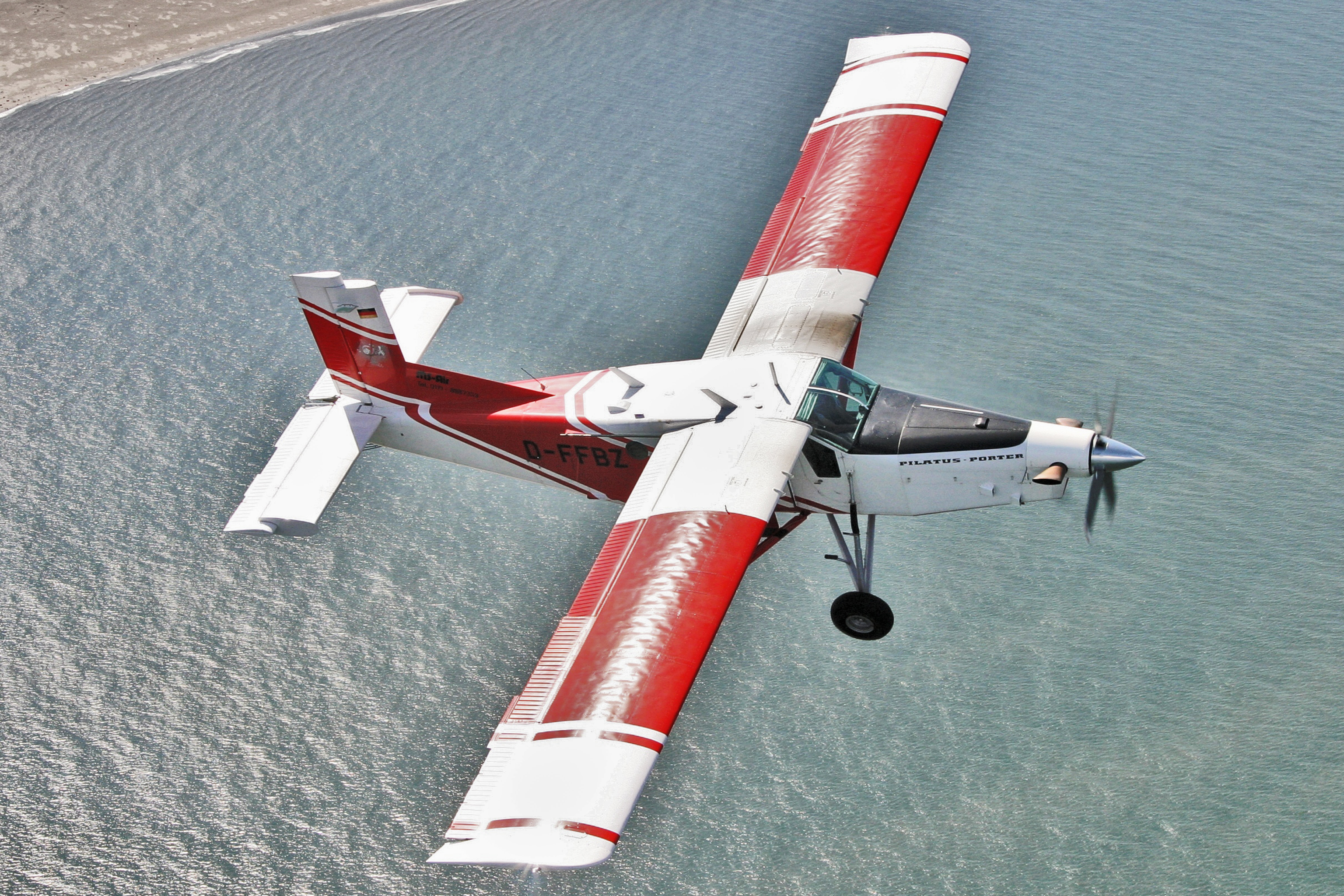
Pilatus PC-6/ B2-H4 in flight

UV-20

PC-6/340 Porter
Initial production version, powered by a 254-kW (340-hp) Lycoming GSO-480-B1A6 flat-six piston engine. Max takeoff weight 1,960 kg (4,320 lb).

PC-6/340-H1 Porter
As PC-6/340, but with modified landing gear and increased weight (2,016 kg (4,444 lb)).
PC-6/340-H2 Porter
As for H-2, but with maximum takeoff weight increased to 2,200 kg (4,850 lb).

PC-6/350 Porter
As PC-6/340, but powered by a 261 kW (350 hp) Lycoming IGO-540-A1A piston engine.

PC-6/350-H1 Porter
As for /340 H1 but with O-540 engine.
PC-6/350-H2 Porter
As for 340 H2 with O-540 engine.

PC-6/A Turbo-Porter
Initial turboprop powered version, fitted with a 390 kW (523 shp) Turbomeca Astazou IIE or IIG turboprop engine.
PC-6/A1 Turbo-Porter
This 1968 version was powered by a 427-kW (573-shp) Turbomeca Astazou XII turboprop engine.
PC-6/A2 Turbo-Porter
This 1971 version was powered by a 427-kW (573-shp) Turbomeca Astazou XIVE turboprop engine.
PC-6/B Turbo-Porter
This version was powered by a 410-kW (550-shp) Pratt & Whitney Canada PT6A-6A turboprop engine.
PC-6/B1 Turbo-Porter
Similar to the PC-6/B, but fitted with a 410-kW (550-shp) Pratt & Whitney Canada PT6A-20 turboprop engine.
PC-6/B2-H2 Turbo-Porter
Fitted with a 507-kW (680-shp) Pratt & Whitney Canada PT6A-27 turboprop engine.
PC-6/B2-H4 Turbo-Porter
The B2-H4 has improved airframe structuring and extended, upturned wingtips.
PC-6/C Turbo-Porter
One prototype built by Fairchild Industries in the United States, powered by a 429-kW (575-shp) Garrett TPE331-25D turboprop engine.
PC-6/C1 Turbo-Porter
Similar to the PC-6/C, but fitted with a 429-kW (575-shp) Garrett TPE 331-1-100 turboprop engine.
PC-6/C2-H2 Porter
Developed by Fairchild Industries in the USA. It was powered by a 485-ekW (650-ehp) Garrett TPE 331-101F turboprop engine.
PC-6/D-H3 Porter
One prototype, fitted with a 373-kW (500-hp) avco Lycoming turbocharged piston engine.
AU-23A Peacemaker
Armed gunship, counter-insurgency, utility transport version for the US Air Force. It was used during the Vietnam War in the early 1970s. 15 were built under licence in the USA by Fairchild Industries. All aircraft were sold to Royal Thai Air Force.
OV-12
Designation for US version, cancelled 1979.
UV-20A Chiricahua
STOL utility transport version for the US Army. Two UV-20As were based in West Berlin from late 1979 until 1991.
PC-8D Twin Porter
Twin-engined version flown in 1967, but not subsequently developed.

== Operators ==
=== Current military operators ===
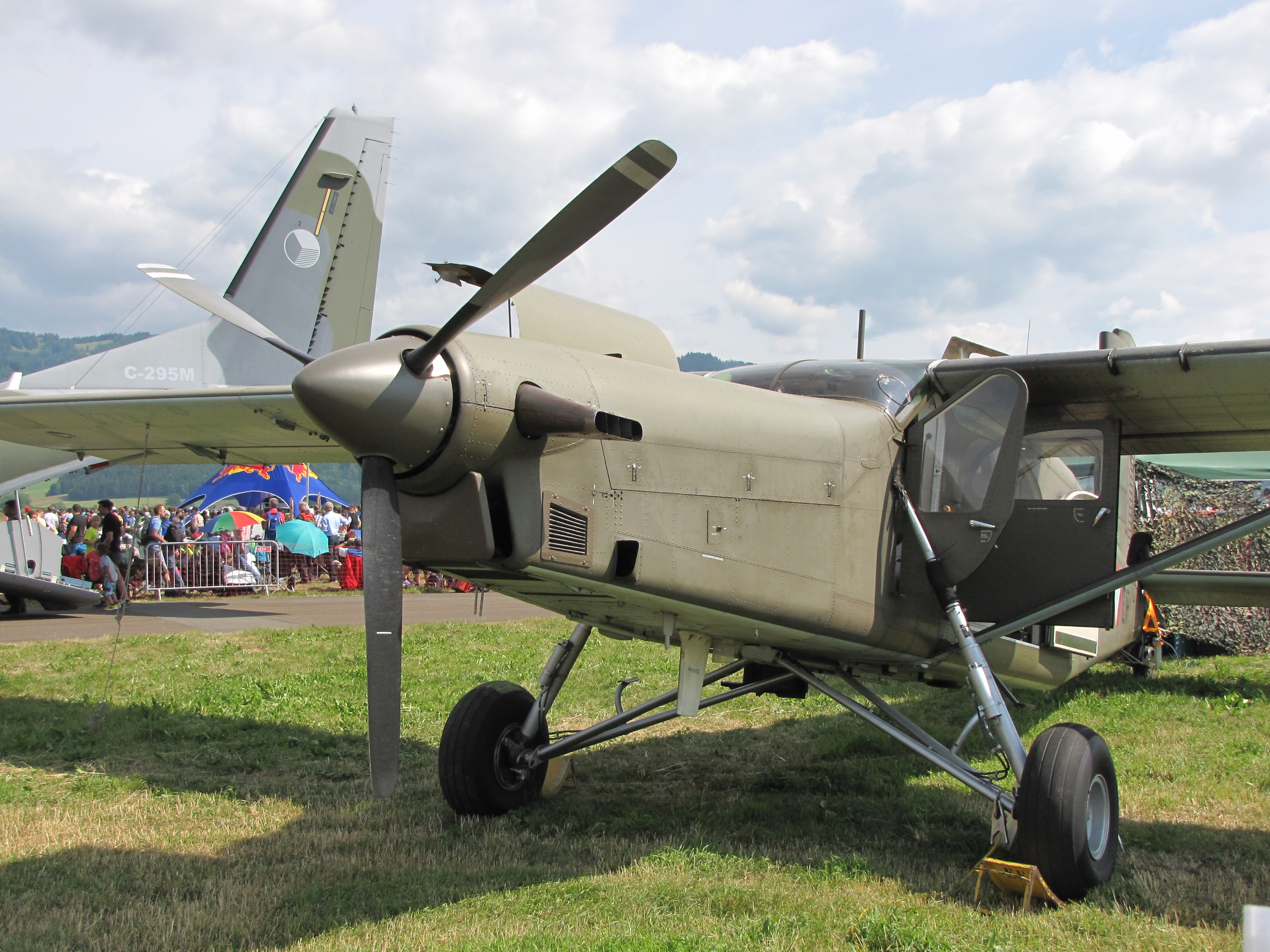
Austrian Air Force PC-6, 2013

Algeria

- Algerian Air Force

Angola

- National Air Force of Angola

Argentina

- Argentine Navy
- Argentine National Gendarmerie

Austria

- Austrian Air Force

Burma (Myanmar)

- Myanmar Air Force - 7 Aircraft

Chad

- Chad Air Force

France

- French Army

Ecuador

- Ecuadorian Army

Iran

- Islamic Republic of Iran Air Force

Mexico

- Mexican Air Force

Peru

- Peruvian Air Force

Slovenia

- Slovenian Air Force and Air Defence

Switzerland

- Swiss Air Force: 8 PC-9s for target towing

Thailand

- Royal Thai Air Force
- Bureau of Royal Rainmaking and Agricultural Aviation

United States

- United States Army Special Operations Command: 1 UV-23A, Black Daggers at Fort Bragg (NC). This aircraft (79-23254) was first operated by the Berlin Brigade Aviation Detachment (Tempelhof Central Airport) of the United States Army Berlin from May 1979 to 1999. From August 1991 to May 2004, it was operated by the United States Army Parachute Team.

=== Former military operators ===
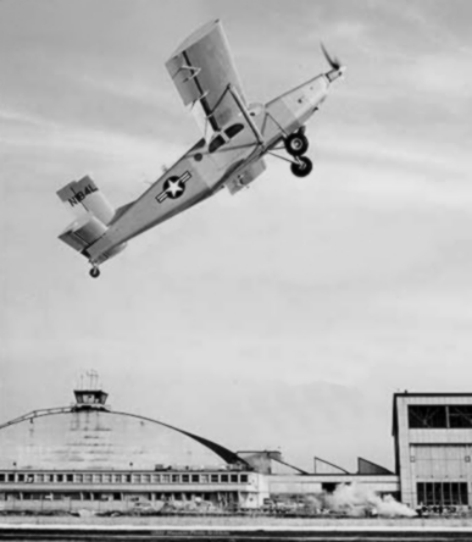
US Air Force PC-6

Australia

- Australian Army Aviation - 19 entered service from February 1968. Last two retired December 1992.
  - 173rd General Support Squadron
  - 161st Independent Reconnaissance Flight
  - No. 163 Independent Reconnaissance Flight
  - No. 171 Air Cavalry Flight
  - School of Army Aviation

Bophuthatswana

- Bophuthatswana Air Force - Later transferred to South African AF

Bolivia
Colombia

- Colombian Air Force
  - SATENA

Indonesia

- Indonesian Air Force
  - Agricultural Air Unit – Five PC-6/B2-H2

Iraq

- Iraqi Army Aviation;
  - Two in service with the 83rd Squadron since 20 November 1987.

Israel

- Israeli Air Force
  - 100 Squadron

Oman

- Royal Air Force of Oman

South Africa

- South African Air Force

Sudan

- Sudanese Air Force - eight ordered in 1966

Thailand

- Royal Thai Army

United Arab Emirates

- United Arab Emirates Air Force

United States

- United States Army
- United States Air Force

Zaire

- White Legion − Used by French mercenaries

=== Law enforcement operators ===
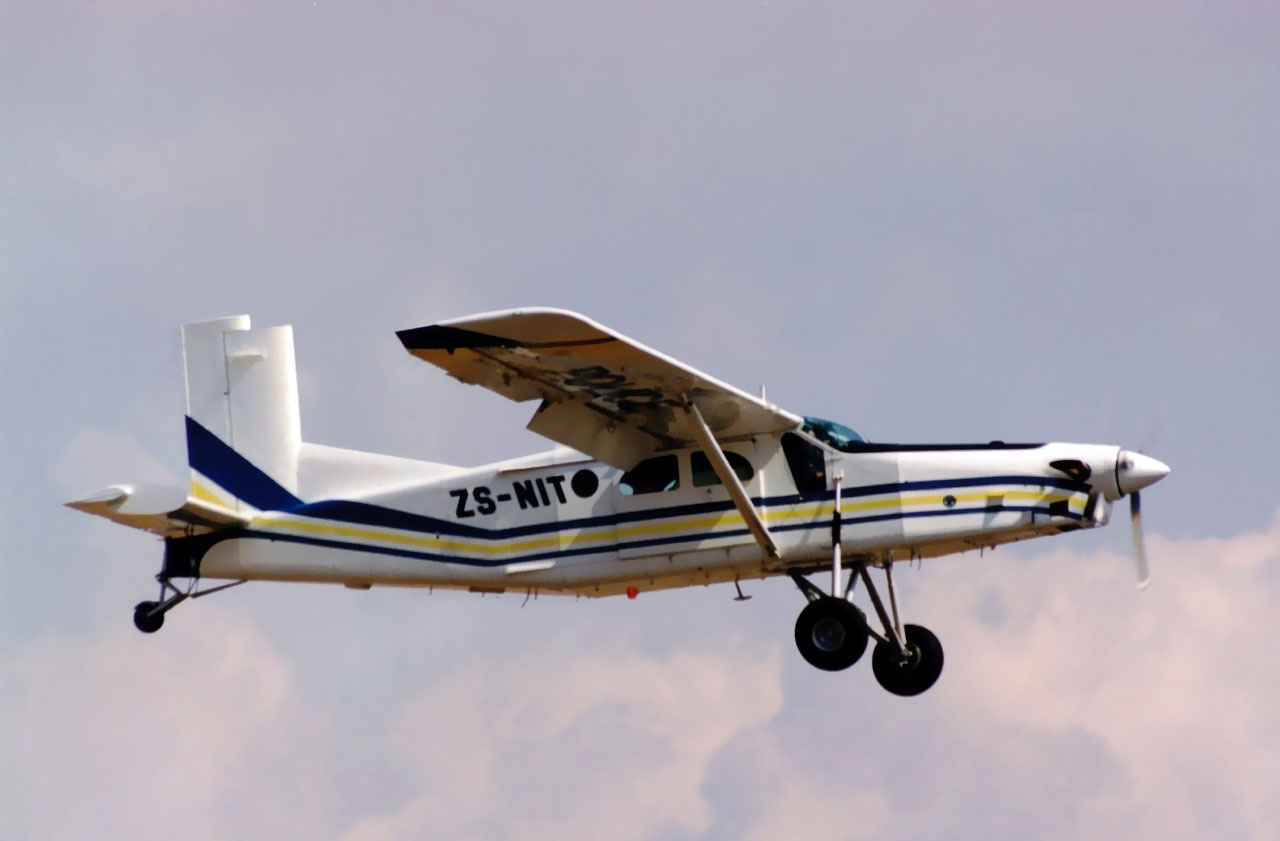
South African Police Pilatus PC-6

Malaysia

- Royal Malaysian Police

Oman

- Royal Oman Police

South Africa

- South African Police Service

Thailand

- Royal Thai Police

=== Civil operators ===
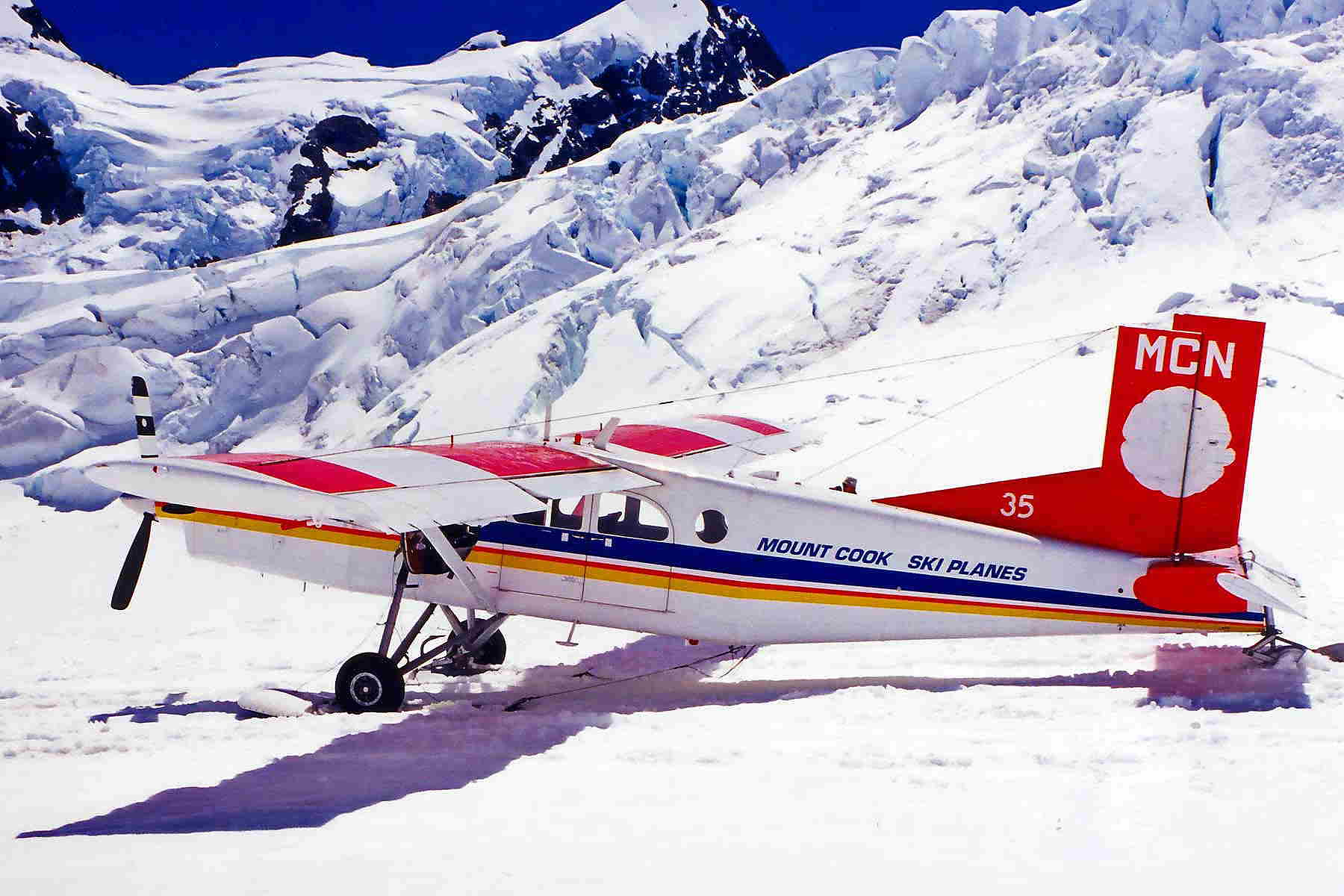
Mount Cook Ski Planes PC-6 upon Franz Josef Glacier, 1999

Australia

- Mission Aviation Fellowship

Canada

- North-Wright Airways

Indonesia

- Adventist Aviation Indonesia
- Associated Mission Aviation<
- Yajasi Aviation
- Smart Aviation
- Susi Air

Mongolia

- Thomas Air

Nepal

- Tara Air

New Zealand

- Mount Cook Airlines

Switzerland

- Para Sport Club Triengen

Portugal

- Sevenair Air Services

Papua New Guinea

- Mission Aviation Fellowship

Thailand

- Thai Ministry of Agriculture

United States

- Air America
- CASI

=== Former civil operators ===
Hungary

- National Hydrological Service
- National Ambulance Service

Indonesia

- Merpati Nusantara Airlines - 12 unit
- Mimika Air

Nepal

- Tara Air

== Accidents and incidents ==
- 18 November 1981, a Pilatus PC-6 (Porter & Turbo Porter) of Royal Nepal Airlines crashed after it lost height during take-off from Biratnagar Airport in Nepal. The fatalities included 1 crew and 9 passengers with no survivors.
- 12 November 1991 - An Australian Army Turbo Porter A14-683 crashed after it stalled on take off, killing two soldiers. The inquiry identified pilot error as the primary cause. The aircraft was written off.
- 26 December 1999 - A Pilatus PC-6/B2-H4 Turbo porter registration HB-FKJ crashed near Turin. Because of heavy turbulence, a wing broke away from the fuselage causing the plane to crash; the two people aboard died.
- 15 March 2002 - A United States Army Pilatus UV-20A collided in midair with a Cessna 182C during parachute jumping operations at Marana Regional Airport, near Marana, Arizona. While the Cessna was able to land, the Pilatus entered an uncontrolled dive and crashed, killing the pilot and destroying the aircraft.
- 30 May 2008 - A Pilatus PC-6/B2-H4 Turbo porter registration EC-JXH crashed near Lillo, Spain. After going into a stall, the plane's left wing broke causing the door to open, allowing nine skydivers to jump out and survive. One skydiver and the pilot died in the crash.
- 25 April 2012 - A Pilatus PC-6 (PK VVQ), operated by Susi Air, crashed in Kalimantan Timur, Melak district killing the pilot and passenger(s) which was engaged in an Aerial Survey of the area. The aircraft was reported missing at 1710 LT on 25 April with the wreckage found on 26 April, thus confirming the condition of the occupants/aircraft.
- 19 October 2013 - A Pilatus PC-6/B2-H4 Turbo Porter registration OO-NAC carrying ten skydivers (instructors and students) and a pilot, lost height and impacted terrain at Fernelmont some ten minutes after takeoff from nearby Namur-Suarlée Airfield (EBNM), Belgium. All aboard died. The aircraft (S/N 710) was built in 1969 and had been rebuilt in 2002 by Pilatus Flugzeugwerke following a takeoff accident at Moorsele (EBMO) on 12 March 2000.
- 19 June 2016 - A Pilatus PC-6 disintegrated in midair while carrying seven skydivers for practice in Beja, Portugal. All skydivers survived, although two were severely wounded. The pilot was the single fatality.
- 30 August 2022 - A South African Police Service PC-6 crashed shortly after taking off from Rand Airport, South Africa. All five passengers died during the accident. The pilot was the sole survivor and was severely injured.
- 8 March 2024 - A Pilatus PC-6 (PK-SNE), operated by Smart Aviation, crashed into a forest near Binuang, Nunukan, North Kalimantan, after taking off from Juwata Tarakan International Airport. During the flight, the plane had two people: the pilot and the engineer. The pilot was the sole survivor.
- 28 June 2026 - PC-6 D-FIPS crashed shortly after taking off from Nancy-Essey Airport. None of the 11 occupants survived.

== Specifications (PC-6 B2 Turbo-Porter) ==

Data from Jane's All The World's Aircraft 1993–1994, Pilatus Aircraft, Flying Magazine

General characteristics

- Crew: 1
- Capacity: up to 10 max / 1,130 kg (2,491 lb)
- Length: 11 m (36 ft 1 in)
- Wingspan: 15.87 m (52 ft 1 in)
- Height: 3.2 m (10 ft 6 in)
- Wing area: 30.15 m^{2} (324.5 sq ft)
- Airfoil: NACA 64-514
- Empty weight: 1,270 kg (2,800 lb)
- Max takeoff weight: 2,800 kg (6,173 lb)
- Powerplant: 1 × Pratt & Whitney Canada PT6A-27 turboprop engine, 410 kW (550 hp) (de-rated from 507 kW (680 hp))
- Propellers: 3-bladed constant-speed reversible propeller

Performance

- Maximum speed: 232 km/h (144 mph, 125 kn)
- Cruise speed: 213 km/h (132 mph, 115 kn)
- Stall speed: 96 km/h (60 mph, 52 kn)
- Never exceed speed: 280 km/h (170 mph, 150 kn)
- Range: 730 km (450 mi, 390 nmi) with maximum payload
- Ferry range: 1,612 km (1,002 mi, 870 nmi) with maximum internal and underwing fuel
- Service ceiling: 8,197 m (26,893 ft)
- Wing loading: 93 kg/m^{2} (19 lb/sq ft)

== Notable appearances in media ==
A PC-6/B2-H2 Turbo-Porter is featured in the opening scene of the 1995 James Bond film GoldenEye, which Bond uses to escape from a clandestine Soviet chemical weapons facility.

== See also ==
Related development

- Fairchild AU-23 Peacemaker
- Pilatus PC-8D Twin Porter

Aircraft of comparable role, configuration, and era

- Antonov An-2/An-3
- Comp Air 8
- Daher Kodiak
- de Havilland Canada DHC-3 Otter
- GippsAero GA10
- PAC P-750 XSTOL
- UZGA LMS-901 Baikal
