= 2008 Madrid Pilatus PC-6 Porter crash =

2008 aviation accident

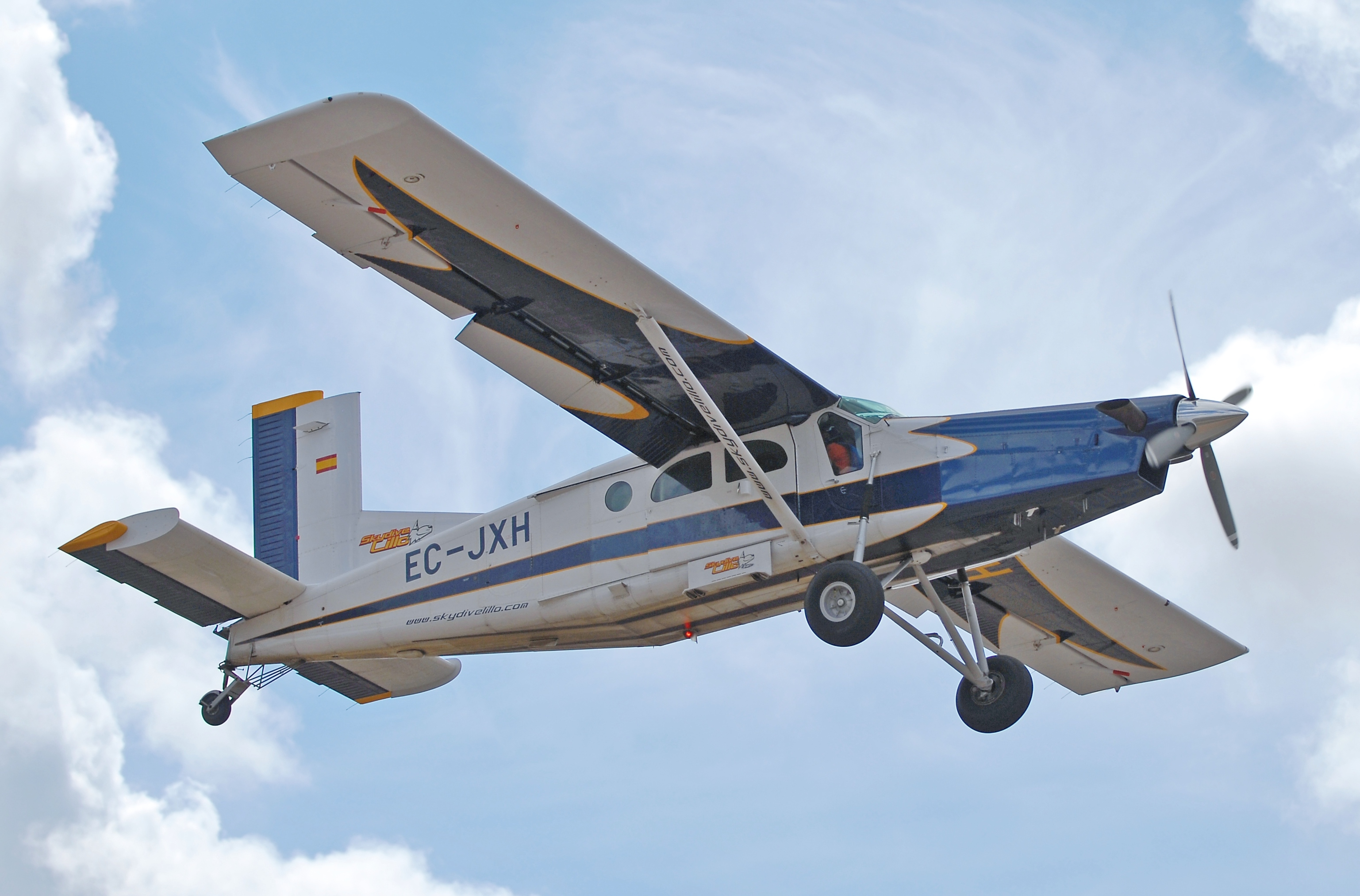
- EC-JXH, the aircraft involved in the incident, photographed March 2008.

Accident
- Date: 30 May 2008
- Summary: Structural failure, Stall and
- Site: Lillo, Madrid, Spain

Aircraft
- Aircraft type: Pilatus PC-6
- Operator: Skydive Lillo
- Registration: EC-JXH
- Flight origin: Lillo, Spain
- Occupants: 10
- Passengers: 9
- Crew: 1
- Fatalities: 2
- Survivors: 8

On May 30, 2008, a chartered Pilatus PC-6 Porter crashed near Lillo after losing a wing. 2 of the people on board were killed.

The plane was used the days before for a Honda's live skydiving TV commercial.

== Crash ==
The plane took off from Lillo to go on a skydiving drop. There was some strong turbulence before the crash and the plane also stalled. The plane crashed after losing a wing.

== Crew and Passengers ==
The pilot and one skydiver were killed in the crash. The skydiver was a Brazilian-born Briton, German Junior Alvares de Silva, from London. There were nine other skydivers onboard who survived the crash, four of them with injuries.

== See also ==
- List of accidents and incidents involving non-commercial flights
