= 2026 Tomblaine Pilatus PC-6 crash =

2026 aviation accident in France

- D-FIPS, the aircraft involved in the accident, seen in 2025

Accident
- Date: 28 June 2026
- Summary: Crashed shortly after takeoff: under investigation
- Site: Tomblaine, Grand Est, France

Aircraft
- Aircraft type: Pilatus PC-6 Porter
- Operator: Classic Wings/KIAS Airlines
- Registration: D-FIPS
- Flight origin: Nancy-Essey Airport, Tomblaine, France
- Destination: Nancy-Essey Airport, Tomblaine, France
- Occupants: 11
- Passengers: 10
- Crew: 1
- Fatalities: 11
- Survivors: 0

On 28 June 2026, a Pilatus PC-6 Porter carrying skydivers crashed immediately after takeoff from Nancy-Essey Airport in Tomblaine, France, killing all eleven occupants. The accident is the deadliest skydiving plane crash in French history.

== Background ==
=== Aircraft ===
The aircraft involved was D-FIPS, a Pilatus PC-6/B2-H4 Turbo Porter manufactured in 1991 and operated by Classic Wings/KIAS Airlines.

=== Passengers and crew ===
The pilot, five instructors, and five trainee parachutists were on board the aircraft. The trainees were reportedly a group of nurses. None of them survived.

== Accident ==
The aircraft crashed at around 11 a.m. into a bike path in a residential area about 300 metres (330 yd) from the runway, narrowly missing nearby homes and a shopping centre. The plane plunged vertically to the ground. A witness said the plane seemingly experienced engine failure. A resident said two bodies were thrown a few meters from the plane. A significant emergency response was mobilized, with police units and 50 firefighters deployed to the scene. Yves Séguy, brought together the relevant services for real-time monitoring of the situation. The French Interior Minister, Laurent Nuñez also visited to the site.

== Investigation ==
The Bureau of Enquiry and Analysis for Civil Aviation Safety (BEA) sent four investigators and a first information investigator to the crash scene.

== See also ==
- 2026 Butler PAC P-750 crash: Another skydiving plane crash in 2026
