= Cantarero =

Cantarero is a surname. Notable people with the surname include:

- Carlos García Cantarero (born 1961), Spanish football manager
- Elvira Moragas Cantarero (1881–1936), Spanish nun
