= Pilatus PC-8D Twin Porter =

Prototype aircraft

PC-8D Twin Porter
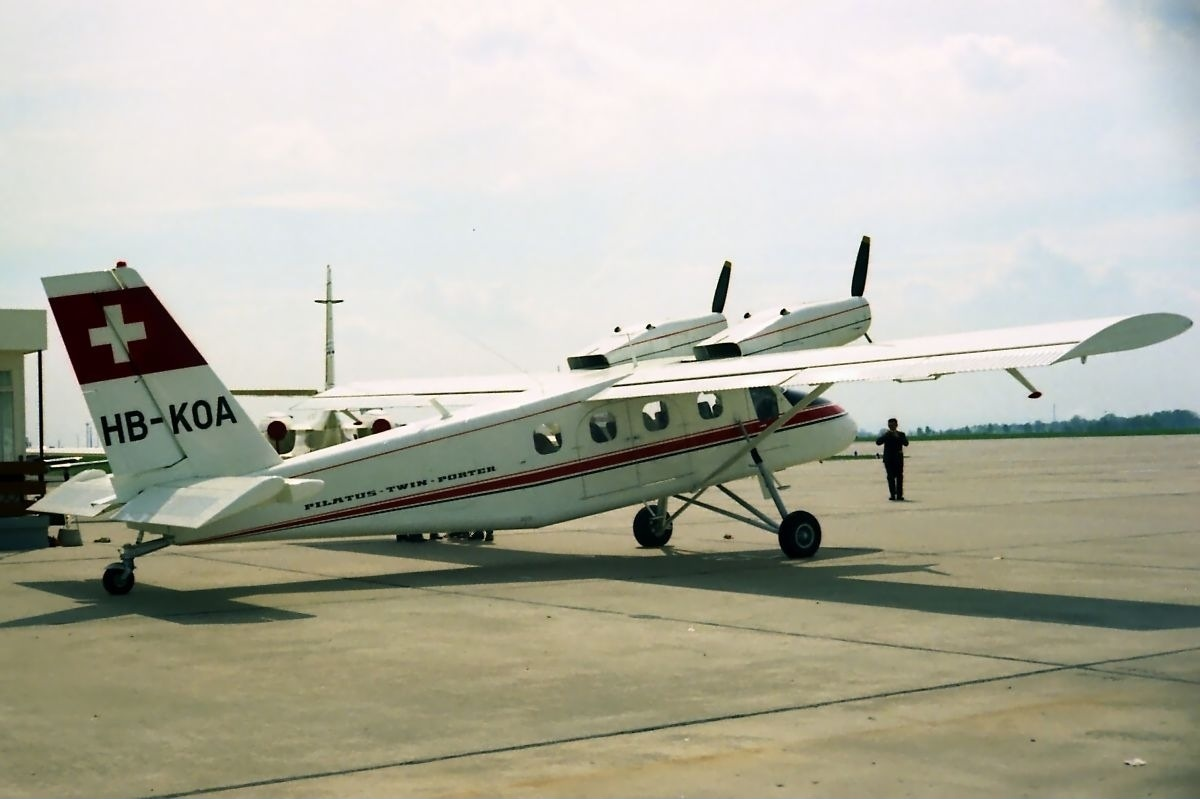

General information
- Type: STOL Light transport
- National origin: Switzerland
- Manufacturer: Pilatus Aircraft
- Status: Scrapped
- Number built: 1

History
- First flight: 28 November 1967
- Developed from: Pilatus PC-6

The Pilatus PC-8D Twin Porter was a Swiss ten-seat light transport built by Pilatus Aircraft. The type did not go into production and only one was built.

Work on the Twin Porter started in 1966, it was a modified Pilatus PC-6 high-wing monoplane with the nose-mounted engine removed and two 290 hp Lycoming IO-540-GIB engines mounted on the wing leading edges. The prototype first flew on 28 November 1967. Only one aircraft was built as flight testing was halted in 1969.

== Specifications ==
Data from Jane's All the World's Aircraft 1968–69

General characteristics

- Crew: 1
- Capacity: 9 passengers
- Length: 10.50 m (34 ft 5 in)
- Wingspan: 15.60 m (51 ft 2 in)
- Height: 3.65 m (12 ft 0 in)
- Wing area: 32.4 m^{2} (349 sq ft)
- Empty weight: 1,550 kg (3,417 lb) (equipped)
- Max takeoff weight: 2,700 kg (5,952 lb)
- Powerplant: 2 × Lycoming IO-540-GIB5 air-cooled six-cylinder horizontally-opposed, 220 kW (290 hp) each
- Propellers: 3-bladed Hartzell HC-A3VK/V8433-4, 2.03 m (6 ft 8 in) diameter

Performance

- Maximum speed: 260 km/h (160 mph, 140 kn)
- Cruise speed: 230 km/h (140 mph, 120 kn) max cruise (70% power at sea level)
- Range: 1,400 km (870 mi, 760 nmi) max fuel, 620 kg (1,370 lb) payload, no reserves
- Rate of climb: 6 m/s (1,200 ft/min)
- Take off distance to 15 m (50 ft): 260 m (850 ft)
- Landing distance from 15 m (50 ft): 250 m (820 ft)

== See also ==
External images
- Pilatus PC-8 Twinporter
- Pilatus PC-8A Plan
- Pilatus PC-8D Plan

Related development

- Pilatus PC-6

Aircraft of comparable role, configuration, and era

- Britten-Norman Islander
