= Fairchild AU-23 Peacemaker =

American armed fixed-wing counter-insurgency and utility transport aircraft

AU-23 Peacemaker
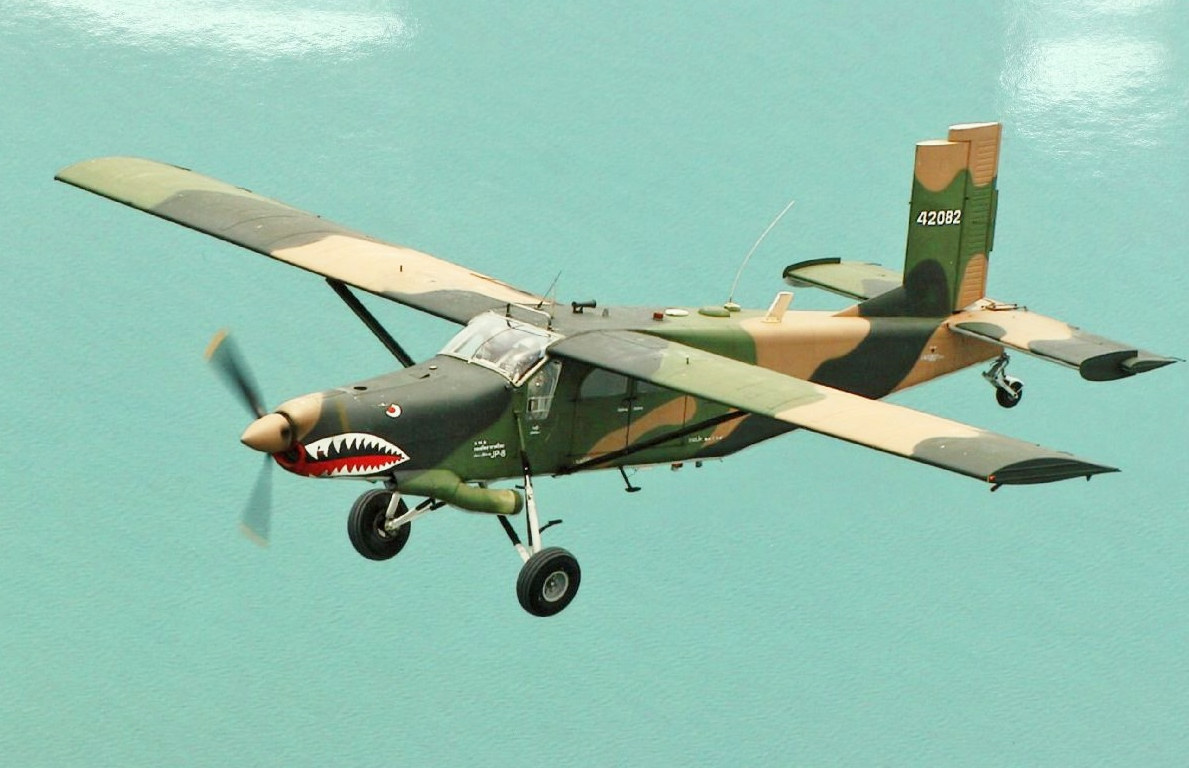
- Fairchild AU-23A Peacemaker in flight

General information
- Type: Armed gunship, counter-insurgency, utility transport
- Manufacturer: Fairchild Aircraft
- Primary users: United States Air Force Royal Thai Air Force
- Number built: 35

History
- First flight: 1971
- Developed from: Pilatus PC-6 Porter

The Fairchild AU-23 Peacemaker is an armed fixed-wing counter-insurgency (COIN) and utility transport aircraft. It was a license-built derivative of the Pilatus PC-6 Porter, produced by the American conglomerate Fairchild Industries.

The AU-23 originated in the Credible Chase program, which was started by the Aeronautical Systems Division in 1971 to seek a capable armed light utility aircraft for potential use in the then-ongoing Vietnam War. The PC-6 was selected along with the Helio AU-24 Stallion to undergo an evaluation, during which the type was flown by personnel of the United States Air Force (USAF), Royal Thai Air Force (RTAF) and Republic of Vietnam Air Force (RVNAF). Numerous live combat missions were flown in North Thailand as part of this evaluation. Work was halted on the initiative after it was concluded that extensive upgrades would be necessary to realistically enable the AU-23 to participate in frontline combat.

The existing 34 aircraft were temporarily stored before being ultimately sold to the Royal Thai Air Force (RTAF). Typically flown on border surveillance and COIN operations, the RTAF has continued to operate their AU-23s into the twenty-first century.

== Design and development ==
In May 1971, the Aeronautical Systems Division at Wright-Patterson Air Force Base, Ohio, began work on a project to evaluate the potential use of armed, light utility, short-takeoff-and-landing aircraft for combat operations in Southeast Asia. This program, named Credible Chase, was designed to add mobility and firepower to the South Vietnamese Republic of Vietnam Air Force (RVNAF) in a relatively short time. It was recognised that, in addition to suitable performance, the prospective aircraft ought to be relatively easy to maintain as well as to fly.

Two commercial aircraft were selected for evaluation, the Fairchild Porter and the Helio AU-24 Stallion. Initial performance testing was conducted with leased aircraft at Eglin Air Force Base, Florida, and was successful enough to warrant a combat evaluation. The Porter, designated AU-23A, was fitted with a side-firing 20mm three-barreled M197 electric cannon, four wing pylons, and a center fuselage station for external ordnance. The 20 mm cannon was essentially a three-barrel version of the M61 Vulcan six-barrel 20 mm cannon. The aircraft could carry a variety of ordnance, including forward-firing gun pods, 500 and 250 lb (230 and 110 kg) bombs, napalm units, cluster bomb units, flares, rockets, smoke grenades, and leaflet dispensers. If required, the aircraft could be converted to a civil utility configuration within the space of one hour.

== Operational history ==
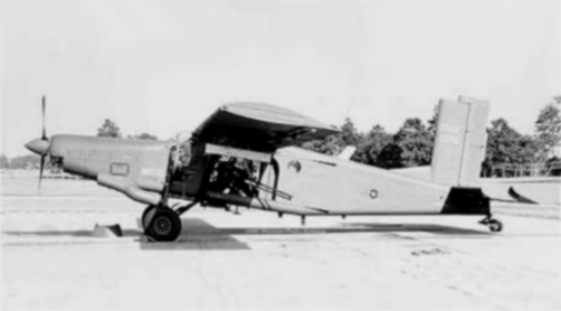
Fairchild AU-23A Peacemaker at Eglin AFB, Florida in 1972

The combat evaluation, PAVE COIN, was performed in June and July 1971. The AU-23A was tested for eight possible missions - armed escort of helicopters, close air support, hamlet defense, STOL airlift and resupply, armed reconnaissance, border surveillance, forward air control, and counter-infiltration. USAF crews flew 73 missions (94 sorties) and RVNAF crews flew 68 missions (85 sorties). Several types of weapons were test dropped/fired, including 2.75-inch (70 mm) rockets (explosive and smoke), CBU-14 cluster bombs, MK 6 Mod 3 flares, and MK 81, -82, and -106 practice bombs. More than 8,000 rounds of 20 mm ammunition were fired, both high-explosive incendiary and target-practice tracer types. Several problems were discovered during the PAVE COIN program, the most serious was the extreme vulnerability of the aircraft to all but the lightest anti-aircraft fire (below 12.7 mm). Despite the problems, the USAF continued with the development program and ordered 15 AU-23As for further testing.

The 4400th Special Operations Squadron (Provisional) was created to complete the operational testing and evaluation of the Credible Chase aircraft. The first AU-23A (72-1306) was delivered to the 4400th SOS on 2 January 1972, followed by two more aircraft (72-1304 and 72-1305) at the end of the month. Testing continued until 4 February, at which point all three aircraft were grounded after the discovery of cracks in the rudder assemblies. The first three aircraft were returned to Fairchild for repair, and the delivery of new aircraft resumed in late April 1972. On 10 May 1972, an AU-23A (S/N 72-1309) crashed after an in-flight engine failure. The pilot was not hurt, but all AU-23As were temporarily grounded throughout the accident investigation, which was lifted on 22 May. The last AU-23A was delivered on June 7 and testing was completed on June 28.

The 4400th recommended the aircraft not be used in combat without a major upgrade program. Specific problems identified included a slow combat speed (135 knots (250 km/h)), a low working altitude, no capability for "zoom" escapes after delivering ordnance, and a complete lack of armor protection for the crew and vital aircraft systems. Accordingly, both aircraft were rejected for service. On 30 June 1972, the 4400th SOS ferried the AU-23As to Davis-Monthan Air Force Base, Arizona, where they were placed into temporary storage.

Prior to entering storage, one AU-23A had been briefly deployed to Thailand during the summer of 1971, during which it was flown by Royal Thai Air Force (RTAF) pilots against communist guerrillas active in the country's north, reportedly conducting 83 combat missions, during which the type garnered favourable opinion amongst Thai officials. In May 1976, an initial order for 20 ex-USAF aircraft was placed by Thailand. Upon delivery, these were flown by both 202 Squadron and 531 Squadron. Over time, these aircraft have received various upgrades, included the replacement of analogue instrumentation with digital counterparts (improving their night flight capability), and the provision of FLIR Systems Star Safire III electro-optic/infrared sensors. Typically, Thai AU-23As were tasked with conducting border surveillance and counter-infiltration operations. The RTAF has used the aircraft for several atypical mission types, including rainmaking and communicating with ground personnel (via loudspeakers) during natural disasters.

The AU-23A was not the only aircraft operated in the COIN role by the RTAF, it also operated the North American Rockwell OV-10 Bronco. During the 1990s, Thailand was reportedly looking at options, such as the Dassault/Dornier Alpha Jet, as a potential replacement for its AU-23A fleet. In 2022, the type's 50th year of operations with the RTAF, 12 of the 33 aircraft originally supplied reportedly remained in the service's inventory, and eight were stated to be operational. Furthermore, it was stated that the AU-23A could continue to be operated for at least another 15 years.

== Operators ==
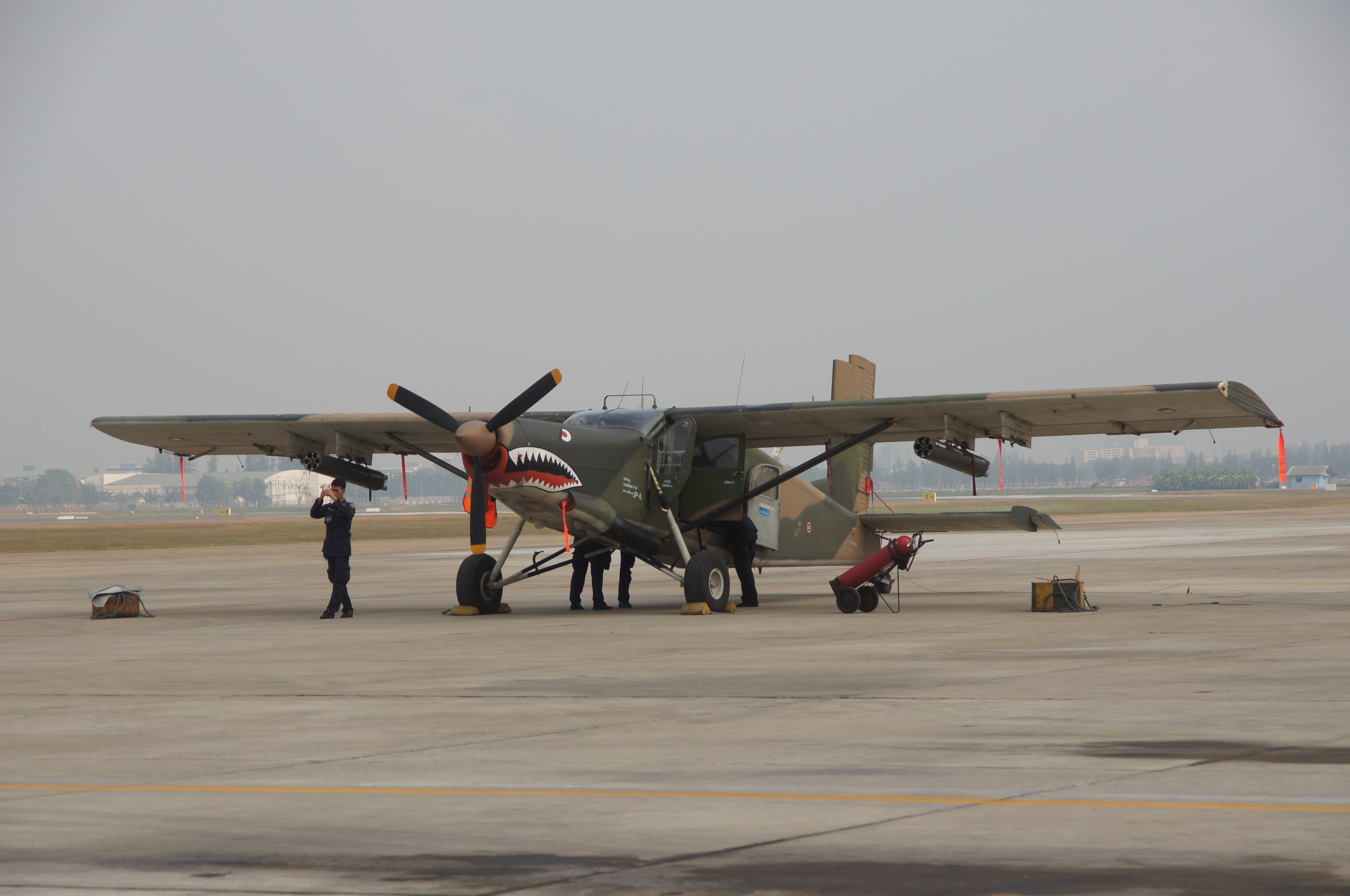
Royal Thai Air Force Fairchild AU-23 Peacemaker in 2013

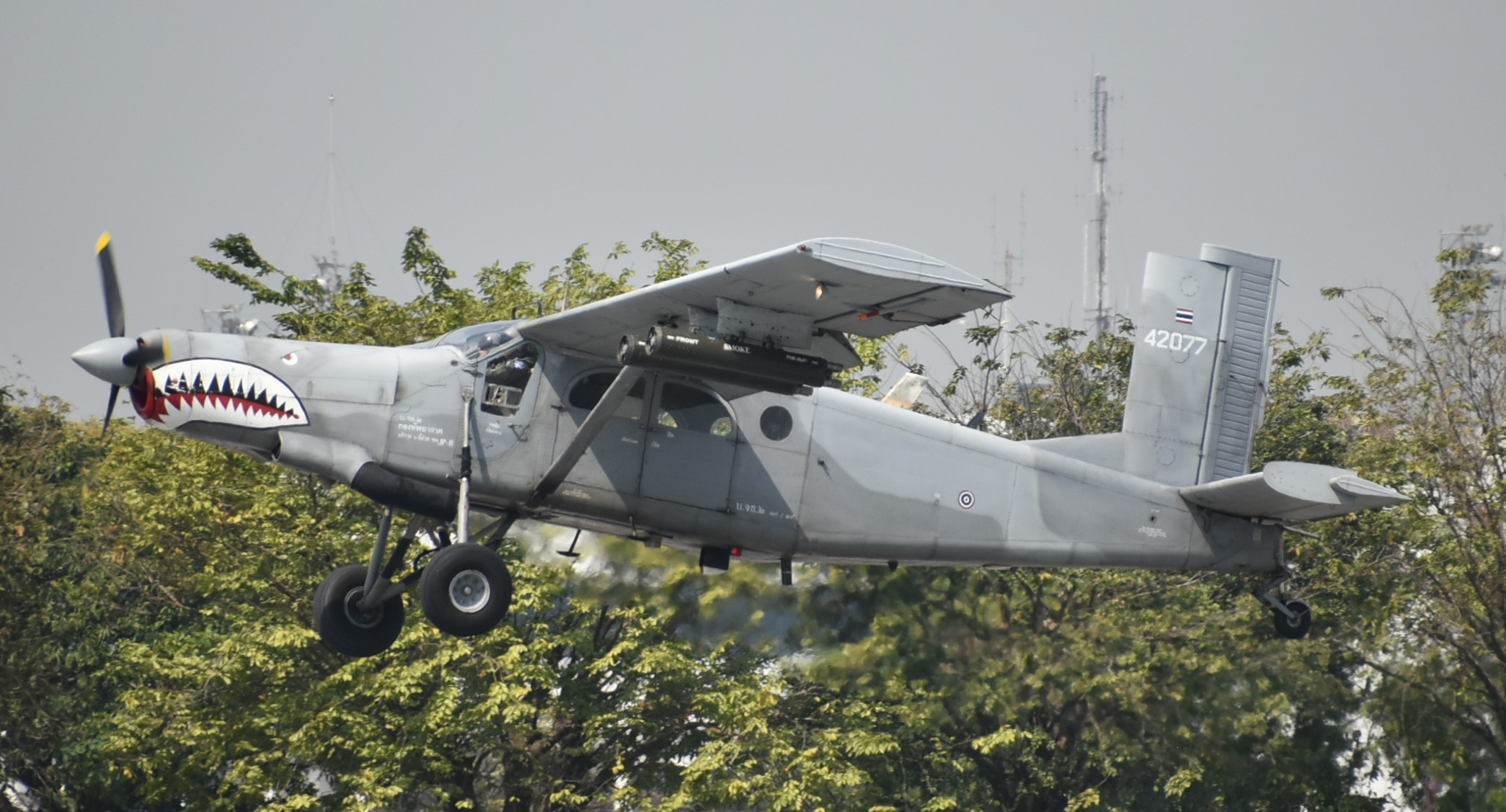
Royal Thai Air Force Fairchild AU-23 Peacemaker (s/n 2077 / BJTh2-18/19) in 2018

Thailand

- Royal Thai Air Force : 34 AU-23A: 14 x AU-23A delivered by USAF (13 in 1972 and one in 1977) and 20 others (s/n 2073 to 2092) delivered in 1976 by Fairchild. In 2024, 14 are on duty (501 Light Attack Sqn, Wing 5 Prachuap Royal Air Force base at Prachuap Khiri Khan). Locally designated B.JT.2 (Thai: บ.จธ.๒).

United States

- United States Air Force : 15 AU-23A (s/n 2020, 2039 and 2050 to 2062), 4400th Special Operations Squadron (Provisional) - former operator. 13 delivered to Thailand in 1972 and 1 in 1977. 72-1309 (s/n 2055) crashes before delivery at Eglin AFB on 10 May 1972.

== Specifications ==
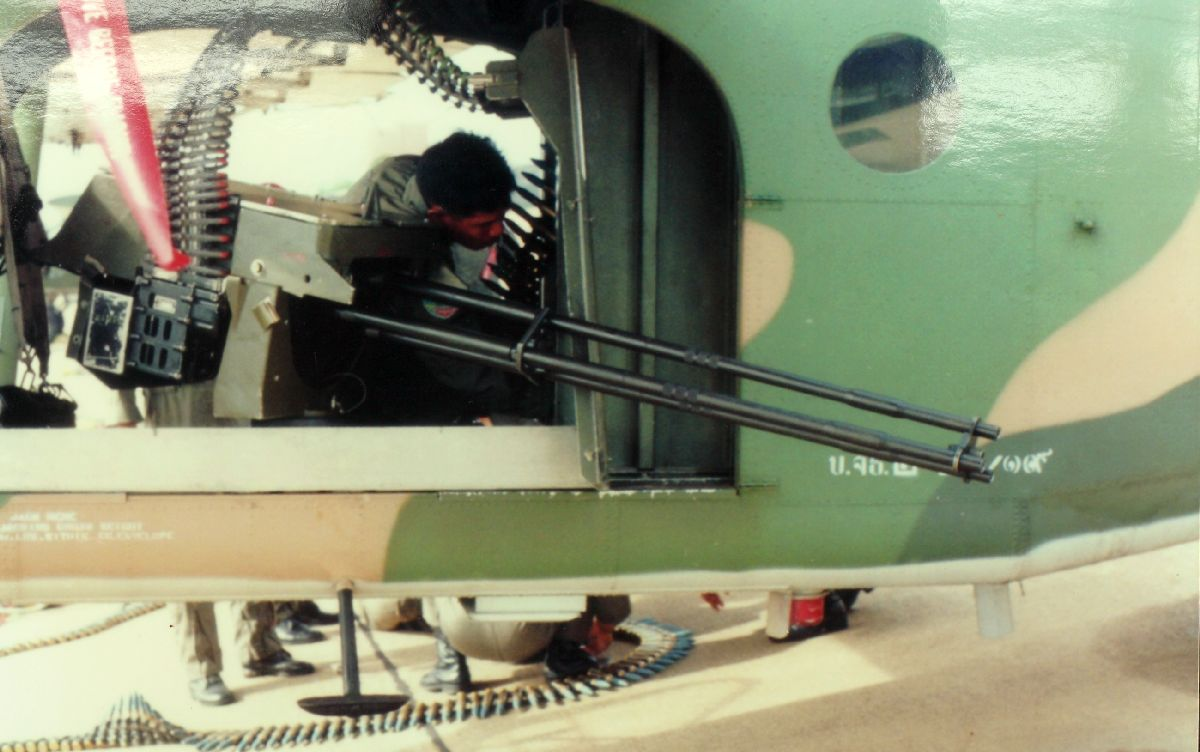
XM197 cannon on an AU-23A

Data from Air Force Magazine

General characteristics

- Crew: 3 (pilot, co-pilot, gunner)
- Capacity: five troops, or six passengers, or six litter patients, three ambulatory patients with one medical attendant
- Length: 36 ft 10 in (11.23 m)
- Wingspan: 49 ft 8 in (15.14 m)
- Height: 14 ft 4 in (4.37 m)
- Gross weight: 6,100 lb (2,767 kg)
- Powerplant: 1 × Garrett TPE-331-1-101F turboprop engine, 650 hp (480 kW)

Performance

- Maximum speed: 148 kn (170 mph, 274 km/h) at take-off power, 5,000 ft (1,524 m) altitude, 6,000 lb (2,722 kg) gross weight
- Cruise speed: 77 kn (88 mph, 142 km/h) at maximum continuous power, 129 kn (239 km/h) combat cruise
- Range: 360 nmi (420 mi, 680 km)
- Combat range: 175 nmi (201 mi, 323 km)
- Endurance: 4.84

Armament

- Up to 1,925 pounds (873 kg) of external stores on five pylons
- XM197 20mm cannon, door-mounted
- XM93 7.62mm minigun
- XM59 .50-cal. (12.7 mm) machine gun and XMU-470 20mm fixed side-firing gun pods.
- SUU11 gun pods
- 2.75-inch (70 mm) rocket pods
- BDU33 with 25 lb (11 kg) bomblets
- Mark 81 250 lb (110 kg) bombs
- Mark 82 500 lb (230 kg) bombs
- BLU118 500 lb (230 kg) napalm canisters
- CBU55 500 lb (230 kg) cluster bomb units
- MK24 flares
- ADU272 canisters
- smoke grenades
- propaganda leaflet dispensers.

== Incidents ==
Royal Thai Air Force 501 Sqn AU-23A JTh2-20/19 coded 42079 (former FY 74-2079) crash-landed in Khlong Hoi Khong district on 5 March 2019.

== See also ==
Related development

- Pilatus PC-6 Porter

Aircraft of comparable role, configuration, and era

- Beechcraft QU-22 Pave Eagle
- Helio AU-24 Stallion
