= Elvira Moragas Cantarero =

Spanish nun

Blessed Elvira Moragas Cantarero OCD
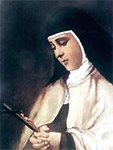

Virgin, martyr
- Born: 8 January 1881; Lillo, Toledo, Kingdom of Spain
- Died: 15 August 1936 (aged 55); Madrid, Second Spanish Republic
- Venerated in: Roman Catholic Church
- Beatified: 10 May 1998, Saint Peter's Square, Vatican City by Pope John Paul II
- Feast: 15 August
- Attributes: Carmelite habit, crucifix
- Patronage: Pharmacists

Elvira Moragas Cantarero, in religion María Sagrario de San Luis Gonzaga (8 January 1881 – 15 August 1936), was a Spanish Catholic nun of the Discalced Carmelites. She was previously one of the first women to become a pharmacist, and her time in the convent saw her assume leadership roles before the Spanish Civil War forced her to go into hiding. She was captured and later shot dead after remaining silent during interrogations.

Her sainthood cause was opened in 1962 under Pope John XXIII. Pope John Paul II beatified her in 1998.

== Biography ==
Elvira Moragas Cantarero was born in Lillo in Toledo in 1881 as the third of four children born to Ricardo Moragas and Isabel Cantarero. Her father worked as a pharmacist and took control of the business from his father Severiano Moragas. Her elder sister Sagrario (born in 1879) died in 1890.

The Moragas moved to Madrid in 1886 after King Alfonso XIII appointed her father as a pharmaceutical advisor to the monarch; the Moragas had been in El Prado from 1885 and in Madrid lived at 97 Bravo Murillo Street above their store. It was there that she became intrigued with her father's work and so desired following him in that career path; those around her noted her as being determined to succeed in this goal. Her initial education was at the San Fernando school before going to high school at the Cardinal Cisneros Institute prior to her college studies from 1900 to 1905. In 1887 she received her Confirmation.

Moragas became an excellent student in school and achieved top results while passing her baccalaureate on 29 June 1889. In 1900 she became one of the first women to have entered the pharmaceutical department of the college in Madrid. Moragas obtained her pharmacist's license on 16 June 1905. The death of her father in 1909 saw her assume control of his business so as to support her mother and siblings; her mother died later in 1911. In 1915 her brother Ricardo graduated as a pharmacist and he took over the business so that his sister could follow her call into the religious life. Her spiritual director around this time was José María Rubio Peralta.

On 21 June 1915 she was accepted as a postulant at the Saints Anne and Joseph convent in Madrid. On 21 December 1915 she was vested in the habit and received her religious name. She made her first vows on 24 December 1916, while her solemn profession of her vows was celebrated on 6 January 1920. On 18 April 1927 she was elected as her house's prioress and she held that position until 1930 when she served as mistress of novices until 1936. Moragas was again invested with the position of prioress on 1 July 1936 and would hold the position until her death.

On 20 July 1936 a large mob attacked the convent so she spirited her fellow religious to safe haven while seeking shelter with Sister Teresa María in the home of the latter's parents. It was around this point that her brother asked her to come live with him in a neighbouring village for her to remain safe. But she refused the offer and said that she had to watch over her sisters. But she and her companion were arrested on 14 August. During interrogations she remained silent as her questioners asked where the convent's valuables were being hidden since raids revealed nothing of value. Instead her silence caused great anger to her interrogators who pressed her for information. Her refusal prompted a militiaman to give her a piece of paper in which she wrote: "¡Viva Cristo Rey!" (Long live Christ the King). This infuriated the militiamen who decided to kill her if no information could be obtained from her. Moragas was shot dead at the San Isidro hermitage after being transported there during the late evening on 15 August before midnight.

== Veneration ==
The beatification process was closed in the archdiocesan cathedral on 15 February 1965; the Congregation for the Causes of Saints later validated the process on 14 December 1984. The congregation likewise approved the cause on 21 January 1997. Pope John Paul II confirmed the beatification of María Sagrario de San Luis Gonzaga on 8 March 1997 after confirming that she had died in odium fidei ("in hatred of the faith"). The pope presided over the beatification rites in Saint Peter's Square on 10 May 1998. The current postulator for this cause is the Discalced Carmelite Romano Gambalunga.

=== Patronage ===
In 1998 the Archbishop of Madrid Cardinal Antonio María Rouco Varela proposed her as a patron for pharmacists on the occasion of her beatification.
