= Lillo, Spain =

Lillo
- Municipality
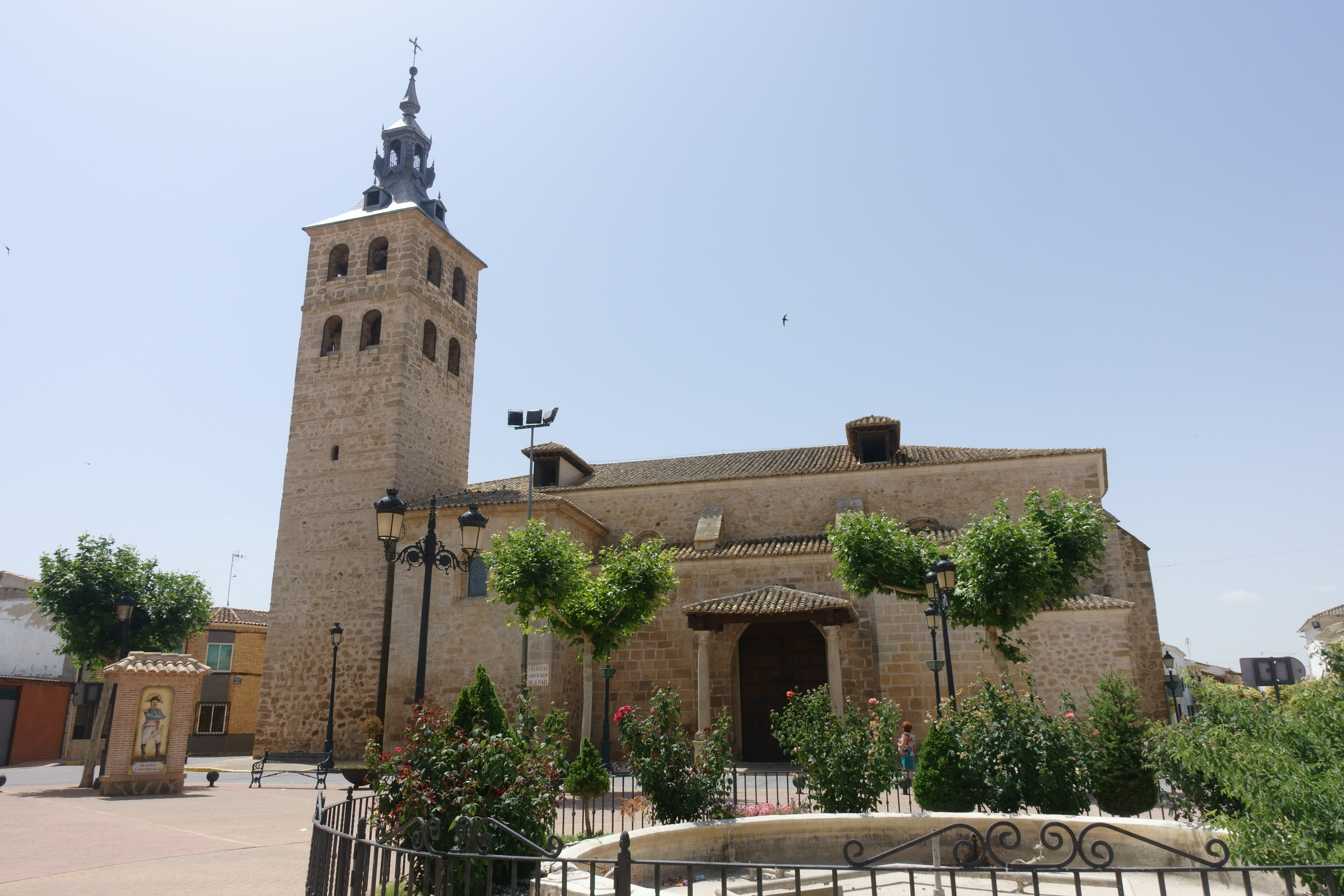
- Church of San Martín Obispo

- Coat of arms

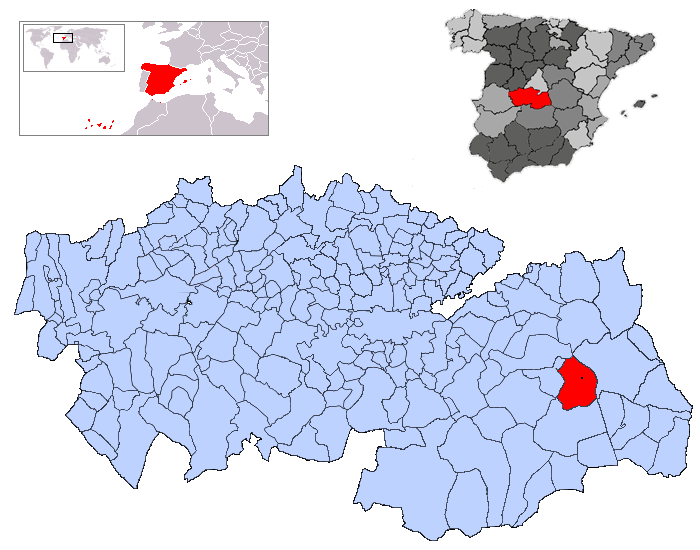
- Region of Mesa de Ocaña in Toledo

- Location in Spain
- Coordinates: 39°43′17″N 3°18′17″W
- Country: Spain
- Autonomous community: Castile-La Mancha
- Province: Toledo
- Comarca: Mesa de Ocaña
- Judicial district: Ocaña
- Founded: Ver texto
- Named for: Liliv (Linium plant)

Government
  - Type: Mayor-council government
  - Body: Casa Consistorial de Lillo
  - Alcalde: Julián Sánchez Casas (ASHL)

Area
  - Total: 151 km^{2} (58 sq mi)
- Elevation: 684 m (2,244 ft)

Population (2025-01-01)
  - Total: 2,519
  - Density: 16.7/km^{2} (43.2/sq mi)
- Demonym(s): Lillero, -ra
- Time zone: UTC+1 (CET)
  - Summer (DST): UTC+2 (CEST)
- Postal code: 45870
- Dialing code: 925
- Website: Official website

Lillo is a municipality and Spanish locality in the province of Toledo, in the autonomous community of Castilla la-mancha. The municipality has a population of 2493 inhabitants (INE 2024).

== Toponymy ==
The name of "Lillo" could derive from the Latin word "liliv", which means lilium.

== Nature ==
=== Flora and fauna ===
The most characteristic flora is represented, in addition to the poplar, oak, elm, scrub oak and broom, by the salicor and esparto grass.

There are several endorheic and salt lagoons that have been declared Nature Reserves and boast characteristic flora, including the Moorish sedge or almorchín, endangered species in the region. Also recognizable are the Lygeum spartum rock formations, whose conservation is of priority interest because they contain plants listed in the Regional Catalogue of Endangered Species. The rock formation located between El Longar lagoon and the town of Lillo is considered one of the best-preserved and largest rock formations in the entire province of Toledo. Particularly notable are the Lepidium cardamines and Limonium costae species.

The land fauna is represented by rabbits and hares and the occasional, although rare, fox. The most typical birds are the red-legged partridge, quail, turtle dove, wood pigeon and pigeon. Among the birds of prey are the lesser kestrel and Montagu's harrier. The lagoons, in addition to being declared a Nature Reserve, are also included in the Site of Community Importance "Wetlands of La Mancha" and the Special Protection Area for Birds (SPA) "wetlands of La Mancha". The main faunal value is the aquatic birds: stilt, black-winged stilt, avocet, common crane, Kentish plover, lapwing, white-headed shelduck, red-crested pochard, as well as marsh harriers.

Part of the municipality of Lillo is also included in the SPA of the Steppe Area of North La-Mancha, where the presence of great bustard colonies is particularly noteworthy.

=== Geology ===
This section describes the most important characteristics of the existing formations, as well as the hydrogeological behavior of the materials. The data were obtained from sheet 659 of the Geological Map of Spain from the Geological and Mining Institute of Spain.

The geomorphological features correspond to those of a plain that forms part of the southern edge of the Ocaña Mesa. The gentle topography is caused by Miocene and Pliocene materials, which give rise to mesas as a consequence of the current hydrographic network. Isolated and breaking up the monotony of the landscape, a series of Cambrian reliefs resistant to erosion appear as island mountains.

Discordant with the Paleozoic, the Continental Tertiary appears subject to lateral facies variations, from east to west. Tertiary deposition begins with Vindobonian clayey and evaporite series that end with the Pontian calcareous sections.

Quaternary materials are well represented by the lagoonal gypsum clay-silt formations of Lillo and hillside debris surrounding the Paleozoic quartzite outcrops.

== History ==
There were found archeological remains which are dated of the Roman period. During the Spanish middle-age it belonged to the Crown of Castille, and later to the Order of Malta, and later, to the archibisop of Toledo. Administratively it belonged to La Guardia municipality until 1430, year on which it received the title of Ville in order of the prelate of Toledo Juan Martínez Contreras. Pedro López de Ayala, fourth count of Fuensalida, bought the municipality in 1584.

The village received a wall in any moment of its history, but nowadays only remains a small piece of it on the urban layout, which demonstrates how it used to defend the Calle Ancha, the Calle del Convento and the Calle del Sol. The best example of this remain is shown in the Puerta de la Guardia, as it says in Spanish, in one of the oldest entries to the village.

During the XIX century, Lillo had 586 houses and the municipality budget was of about 33000 reales, of which 5500 were to paid the secretary. In 1885 Lillo was hit by a cholera epidemic.

== Demography ==
It has a population of 2493 inhabitants, according to the INE of 2024.

Historical population

Year	Pop.	±%
1842	1,806	—
1857	2,635	+45.9%
1860	2,536	−3.8%
1877	2,609	+2.9%
1887	2,719	+4.2%
1897	2,670	−1.8%
1900	2,652	−0.7%
1910	3,041	+14.7%
1920	3,339	+9.8%
1930	3,765	+12.8%

Year	Pop.	±%
1940	3,769	+0.1%
1950	4,175	+10.8%
1960	4,066	−2.6%
1970	3,341	−17.8%
1981	3,039	−9.0%
1991	2,881	−5.2%
2001	2,922	+1.4%
2011	3,045	+4.2%
2021	2,590	−14.9%

- 1842, 1877–2021: De jure population according to the population censuses of the INE.
- 1857 and 1860: De facto population according to the population censuses of the INE.

== Administration ==
Mayors since Spanish democratic elections of 1979
Period	Name	Political party
1979-1983	José Martín González	UCD
1983-1987	José Antonio Álvarez Álvarez	AP/PDP/UPL (coalition in PP)
1987-1991	Emilio Barajas Fernández	PSOE
1991-1995	Juan A. Durán González (13/03/1992) Julián Sánchez Casas	PP PSOE
1995-1999	Julián Sánchez Casas	PSOE
1999-2003	Julián Sánchez Casas	PSOE
2003-2007	Julián Sánchez Casas (09/07/2003) Eva María López Álvarez	PSOE
2007-2009	Ángel Valencia Pacheco	PP
2009-2011	Eva María López Álvarez	PSOE
2011-actuality	Julián Sánchez Casas	ASHL

== Notable people ==
=== B ===
- Lorenzo Balbo

=== G ===
- Venancio González y Fernández
- Alfonso González Lozano

=== M ===
- Elvira Moragas Cantarero

=== O ===
- Calixto Ortega (recorder)
