= Nancy-Essey Airport =

Nancy – Essey Airport Advanced Landing Ground (ALG) Y-42
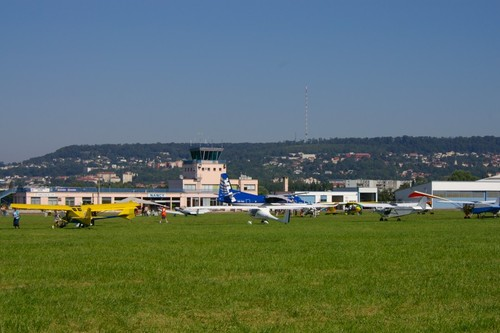
- IATA: ENC; ICAO: LFSN

Summary
- Airport type: Public
- Serves: Nancy, France
- Location: Tomblaine
- Elevation AMSL: 751 ft / 229 m
- Coordinates: 48°41′32″N 006°13′34″E

Map
- Location of airport in France

Runways
Direction	Length		Surface
Direction	m	ft	Surface
03/21	1,600	5,249	Paved
03R/21L	550	1,804	Grass
- Sources: French AIP, UAF

Nancy–Essey Airport (IATA: ENC, ICAO: LFSN) is a regional airport in France, located about 4 km (2 miles) east of Nancy (in the Meurthe-et-Moselle department of the Grand Est region) and about 320 km (199 miles) east of Paris.

It used to be the main airport for Nancy; however, commercial airline traffic was moved to the new Metz-Nancy-Lorraine Airport in 1991. The airfield is open to domestic and international non-scheduled commercial, private aircraft, for IFR and VFR, supporting general aviation and charter aircraft operations.

== History ==
Before 1926, the site was used as a military airfield. However, the airfield was too small, and without the possibility of extension and judged as difficult to use, the airfield was closed. In 1936, the current airport was built as a grass airfield for the French Air Force, and was used as a flight school.

In addition to the military use before World War II, because of the proximity to Paris, the airport was used in the mid-1930s by the postal company Blue Air, which operated a service between Paris-Le Bourget – Nancy – Strasbourg, but this was short lived.

After the Battle of France in 1940, the airfield was seized by the German Luftwaffe, and was used as a transport/combat glider airfield during 1943 and 1944. It was attacked on several occasions by Allied bombers. American units began to move into the Nancy area in late September 1944, and the airfield was liberated in early October. Relatively undamaged, some Pierced Steel Planking was laid down to patch the main runway, and the airfield was declared operationally usable by combat engineers on 15 October 1944. It was designated as Advanced Landing Ground "Y-42".

The airport was used by the Americans as a light aircraft liaison airfield to support the numerous command and control organizations in the Nancy area until the end of the war, with the last unit returning to the United States in September 1945. It was then returned to local French authorities.

Reconstructed, the airport was used by the French Army as a light aviation airfield from the mid-1950s until the 1990s. Commercial use of the airport also resumed in the 1950s The airport was used by commercial airlines until 1991 including Air Vosges, Rousseau Aviation, Air Alsace and TAT which later became Air Liberté. In the early 1980s passenger use exceeded 50,000 passengers per year.

The site hosts a pilot training school, and is used primarily for pleasure flights and business charters. It can also be used as an emergency landing site for commercial aircraft.
