= 2026 in aviation =

The following aviation-related events occurred in the year 2026.

== Events ==
=== January ===
1 January
MASwings rebrands as AirBorneo due to its purchase by the Sarawak government from Malaysia Airlines.

11 January
Allegiant Travel Company announces a $1.5 billion merger deal of Sun Country Airlines. The combined airline will see the Sun Country brand retired eventually and a move to a single FAA AOC (Air Operators Certificate). The deal is scheduled to take place in mid-2026, subject to regulatory and other shareholder approval.

17 January
An Indonesia Air Transport ATR 42, operating on behalf of the Indonesian Directorate General of Marine and Fisheries Resources Surveillance, crashed in South Sulawesi, Indonesia, killing all ten occupants.

25 January
More than 10,000 flights are cancelled across the United States and Canada due to a major winter storm, making it one of the days with the most weather-related flight cancellations in North America.

A Bombardier Challenger 600 crashed in poor weather conditions at Bangor International Airport, killing all six occupants. The airport was under a heavy snowstorm at the time of the accident.

28 January
A Learjet 45 carrying Deputy Chief Minister of Maharashtra Ajit Pawar crashed while landing at Baramati Airport, India, killing all on board. A scandal subsequently surrounded the operator, VSR Ventures, with numerous violations coming to light.

A Beechcraft 1900 operating as SATENA Flight 8849 crashed in Curasica, Norte de Santander, Colombia, killing all 15 occupants.

=== February ===
3–8 February
The Singapore Airshow took place at the Changi Exhibition Centre.

10–11 February
A sudden airspace closure around El Paso International Airport was enacted by the US Federal Aviation Administration, but was lifted a few hours later. This was the first time since the September 11 attacks that US airspace has been closed without advance notice for security reasons.

27 February
A Bolivian Air Force Lockheed C-130 Hercules military aircraft crashed near El Alto International Airport, on the outskirts of La Paz. The aircraft overran the runway and crashed on a busy avenue, colliding with several vehicles. At least 24 people were killed, and more than 43 were injured.

=== March ===
1 March
Due to airspace closures following the Israeli and US airstrikes on Iran, and damage at airports in Dubai, Abu Dhabi, and Kuwait following retaliatory strikes, thousands of flights were cancelled across the Middle East and operations at key hubs in the region were suspended.

22 March
A Bombardier CRJ900 operating as Air Canada Express Flight 8646 collided with a fire truck while landing at LaGuardia Airport, New York City. Both pilots were killed. This was the first fatal accident at LaGuardia in 34 years.

23 March
A Colombian Air Force Lockheed C-130 Hercules military aircraft carrying 126 occupants crashed after takeoff near Puerto Leguízamo. 69 people were killed.

=== April ===
14–19 April
The Sun 'n Fun Air Show was held in Lakeland, Florida, United States.

=== May ===
21 May
Airbus and Air France were both found guilty of corporate manslaughter by the Paris Court of Appeal in relation to the 2009 crash of Air France Flight 447.

=== June ===
14 June
A private PAC P-750 XSTOL skydiving aircraft crashed while taking off from Butler Memorial Airport in Butler, Missouri, killing all 12 people on board.

A private Eurocopter AS350 helicopter collided with a private Bell 206 helicopter over Recreio dos Bandeirantes in Rio de Janeiro, Brazil, killing all six people on board the two aircraft, including American singer-songwriter Oliver Tree; Brazilian record producer, musician, and disc jockey Lucas Frota; Argentine internet personality Gaspi; and Argentine filmmaker Lucas A. Vignale.

15 June
A USAF Boeing B-52 Stratofortress bomber crashed while taking off from Edwards Air Force Base in San Bernardino County, California.

28 June
A private Pilatus PC-6 Porter skydiving aircraft crashed while taking off from Nancy-Essey Airport in Tomblaine, France, killing all 11 people on board, making it the deadliest skydiving crash in French history.

=== July ===
7 July
A Boeing 737-400SF operating as K2 Airways Flight 1732 crashed into the Arabian Sea with five occupants on board, following a loss of navigation systems. The wreckage was discovered 53 nautical miles from the coast of Ormara, Pakistan with no crew members surviving.

20–24 July
The Farnborough International Airshow was held at Farnborough, United Kingdom.

20–26 July
The EAA AirVenture Oshkosh was held in Oshkosh, Wisconsin, United States.

21 July
A deep-sea exploration team announced the discovery of the wreck of the Douglas DC-4 Clipper Endeavor, which as Pan Am Flight 526A had ditched in the Atlantic Ocean off Puerto Rico in April 1952. The wreck lies at a depth of 2,000 feet (610 m).

=== September ===
6 September
21 Air Flight 7598, a cargo flight operated by a Boeing 767-300 on behalf of Amazon Air, overshot the runway at Miami International Airport, striking multiple vehicles, killing five and destroying the aircraft.

8–9 September
A technical failure in the UK's National Air Traffic Services (NATS) flight-processing system caused widespread disruption at 15 airports including Heathrow and Gatwick, resulting in more than 1,750 flight cancellations.

25 September
A Let L-410 Turbolet operated by Tracep Congo Aviation had a technical problem and subsequently crashed at Kenge in Kwango Province, killing all 17 occupants.

30 September
Flydubai Flight 1073 diverted to Tabuk, Saudi Arabia, after the first officer stabbed the captain and put the Boeing 737 MAX 8 into a nosedive. The first officer was then removed from the cockpit by crew members and restrained by passengers. Two pilots traveling as passengers then landed the aircraft safely.

=== October ===
5 October
An ATR 42 operated by the Nigerian Air Force crashed while en route to Lagos, killing all 25 on board.

=== November ===
1 November
A 22-year-old Learjet 60 travelling from Austin, Texas, to North Eleuthera, the Bahamas, crashed in Greenacres, Palm Beach County, Florida, killing all nine on board and injuring one person on the ground.

13 November
The US Federal Aviation Administration issued a nationwide ground stop on all departing flights, following a communication issue impacting all Air Route Traffic Control Centers. Nearly 7,000 flights were delayed or cancelled. It was the second nationwide ground stop since the September 11 attacks, after the one of January 2023.

=== December ===
17 December
Asiana Airlines is scheduled to end their 40 year operation following Korean Air's acquisition.

== First flights ==
- 14 April – Northrop Grumman XRQ-73 SHEPARD
- May – Boeing VC-25B Bridge
- 19 June – Dassault Falcon 10X
- 12 August – Heart Aerospace X1
- 2 September – REGENT Viceroy Seaglider
- 3 October – Northrop Grumman YFQ-48 Talon Blue
- 14 November - Comac CE-25A

== Ceased operations ==
- 5 January – Dove Airlines
- 14 January – Legend Airlines
- 15 January – Tailwind Air
- 31 March – Aer Lingus UK
- 15 April – Magnicharters
- 18 April – Lufthansa CityLine
- 27 April – Air Antilles
- 28 April – Ascend Airways
- 2 May – Spirit Airlines
- 19 May – European Cargo
- 1 July – AirSWIFT
- 7 July – K2 Airways
- 10 July – TezJet Airlines
- 1 August – Izhavia
- 6 August – Flybondi
- 4 November – Global Airlines
- 10 November – AirExplore

== Deadliest crash ==
The deadliest accident of 2026 to date is the crash of a Colombian Air Force Lockheed C-130 Hercules with 126 people on board shortly after takeoff from Caucaya Airport on 23 March, killing 69 and injuring 57.
