= 2026 Colombian Air Force Lockheed C-130 crash =

Aviation accident in Colombia

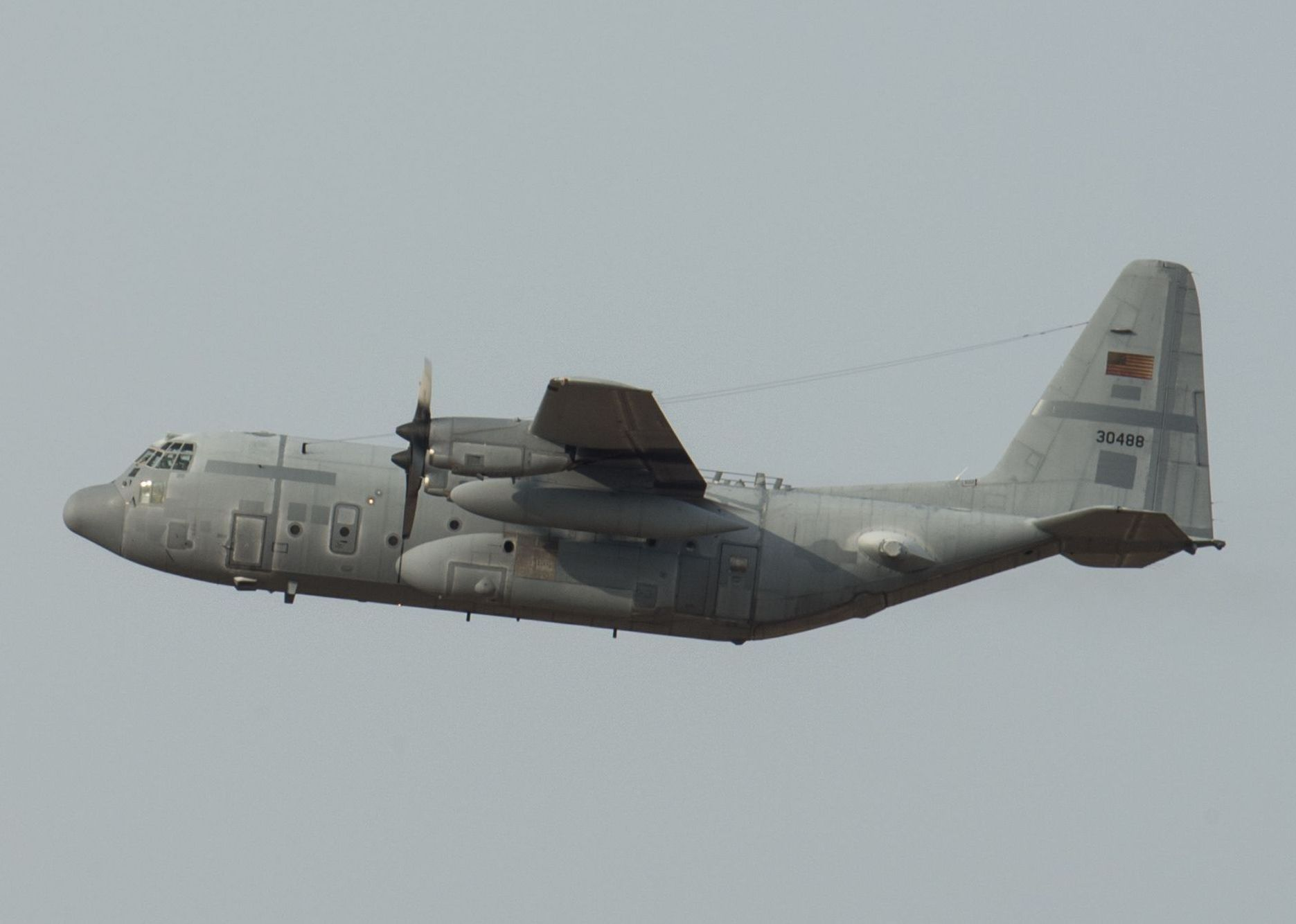
- The aircraft involved in the accident, photographed in 2020 with a previous registration (Note: Picture taken on the aircraft's delivery flight to Colombia by the USAF.)

Accident
- Date: 23 March 2026
- Summary: Crashed after takeoff; under investigation
- Site: Puerto Leguízamo, Putumayo, Colombia; 0°10′44″S 74°47′38″W

Aircraft
- Aircraft type: Lockheed C-130H Hercules
- Operator: Colombian Aerospace Force
- Registration: FAC-1016
- Flight origin: Caucayá Airport, Puerto Leguízamo, Colombia
- Destination: Tres de Mayo Airport, Puerto Asís, Colombia
- Occupants: 126
- Passengers: 115
- Crew: 11
- Fatalities: 69
- Injuries: 57
- Survivors: 57

On 23 March 2026, a Lockheed C-130 Hercules from the Colombian Aerospace Force crashed into dense jungle while taking off from Caucayá Airport in Puerto Leguízamo en route to Tres de Mayo Airport in Puerto Asís, both located in Colombia's Putumayo department near the border with Peru and Ecuador. There were 126 people on board, of whom 69 were killed, and 57 survived with injuries. It is the second deadliest crash in the history of the Colombian Aerospace Force and is the deadliest aviation crash of 2026.

== Background ==
=== Aircraft ===
The aircraft involved in the accident was FAC-1016, a Lockheed C-130H Hercules operated by the Colombian Aerospace Force (FAC). It was manufactured in 1984 and powered by four Allison T56 turboprop engines. It was delivered to Colombia in September 2020 under serial number 83-0488 as part of the Excess Defense Articles program of the United States; it was the first of three C-130Hs to have been delivered through this program. It underwent maintenance between 2021 and 2023, including a complete structural overhaul and engine updates. The airplane had accrued over 10,000 flight hours, with around 537 hours in 2025. According to FAC commander General Carlos Fernando Silva, the plane had over 20,000 hours of useful life remaining when acquired and, with proper maintenance, could have operated "for up to 40 more years." At the time of the accident, it was said to have been in airworthy condition and the crew were "duly qualified".

Since 2022, the Military Forces of Colombia had experienced six prior aviation accidents, which had caused political concerns about the age, sustainability and airworthiness regarding the country's air fleet. According to El Tiempo, United States and Colombian military officials had been in talks in 2025 where the former had raised concerns about maintenance standards and the availability of spare parts for military aircraft such as the Sikorsky UH-60 Black Hawk helicopters and C-130 Hercules in Colombia.

=== Passengers and crew ===
There were 126 people on board the aircraft, consisting of 113 National Army of Colombia members, 2 police officers and 11 crew members. The military officials were to be deployed on a mission in southern Colombia.

=== Region ===
Puerto Leguízamo is a remote town and municipality in the Putumayo Department of Colombia, a region surrounded by the Amazon natural region.

== Accident ==
At 9:50 a.m. COT the Lockheed C-130 departed on a troop transport mission for the National Army of Colombia, en route from Caucayá Airport in Puerto Leguízamo to Tres de Mayo Airport in Puerto Asís, both located in the Colombian department of Putumayo. Shortly after take-off, the aircraft began to lose altitude, with one of the wings clipping a tree. The C-130 crashed into a jungle near Puerto Leguízamo around 1.5 km (0.9 mi) from the airport, near the country's border with Peru. The moments before impact were caught on video. Burning wreckage was spread across parts of the jungle, with the plane being completely destroyed by a post-crash fire. The resulting fire caused ammunition on the plane to detonate.

== Victims ==
Authorities confirmed 69 people were killed; 57 survived, 14 of whom were in critical condition. Among the deceased, six were Air Force crew members and two were police officers, with the rest being from the National Army. Search and rescue operations began shortly after the crash. According to Puerto Leguízamo's deputy mayor, Carlos Claros, the bodies of the deceased were taken to the town's morgue. Some of the injured soldiers were flown to Bogotá for treatment, while other survivors were transported to a local hospital. Once the bodies of victims had been moved from the town, the process of identification would be conducted by the Institute of Legal Medicine in Bogotá.

== Aftermath ==
According to authorities, the area in which the plane crashed was difficult for emergency personnel to reach, which impeded rescue efforts. Residents were first to respond to the crash and pulled survivors from the wreckage; videos from bystanders showed people driving wounded soldiers on the backs of motorcycles to hospitals. Other residents aided by trying to extinguish the fires in the field and surrounding foliage of the impact site.

Military vehicles and trucks carrying soldiers later managed to reach the area to help with the rescue efforts. Two planes, supplied with 74 beds, were sent to the area to transport the injured to hospitals throughout Colombia. The Air Force later sent smaller planes, six more C-130Hs, and military helicopters such as Mil Mi-17s to support in the rescue efforts. Search and rescue efforts were concluded by the end of 24 March. Medical officials faced complications regarding the victim identification effort, as the exploding ammunition in the wreckage, in addition to the initial impact and post-crash fire, led to many of the victims' bodies becoming severely disfigured. By 25 March, 24 victims were identified, with 10 victims' names revealed to the public.

== Investigation ==
Members of the Technical Investigation Corps (CTI) and the Judicial Investigation Unit (SIJIN), as well as other aeronautical experts, were tasked with the investigation. Colombian defense minister Pedro Arnulfo Sánchez said there were no indications that the plane was brought down by "illegal actors", which Richard Emblin of The City Paper Bogotá speculated was alluding to the region being where multiple factions of the former FARC, a group involved in the Colombian conflict, reside and operate; coca cultivation is known to take place as well. According to Emblin, investigators were focusing on three hypotheses — whether the crash was caused by mechanical failure, pilot error, or excess weight. The commander of the air force, General Carlos Fernando Silva Rueda, indicated that a preliminary report clarifying the causes of the incident is expected to be completed before the end of April.

FAC commander General Carlos Fernando Silva stated that details of the crash are not yet known, apart from the fact that the plane experienced a problem. On the morning of 25 March, authorities announced the recovery of the plane's black box, which contained the flight data recorder (FDR) and cockpit voice recorder (CVR).

On 9 April, the Air Force released a statement on its website confirming that the aircraft did not have valid insurance at the time of the accident. Reports indicate that the Air Force had warned as early as January 2026 of a shortfall of approximately 258 billion pesos in insurance coverage for all its aircraft, a situation that was reportedly known to the government but for which the necessary funds were not allocated. The statement was made amid over air safety conditions and the readiness of the Public Force's aircraft in the country.

== Responses ==
=== National ===
After the crash, the Colombian government announced that the country would go into three days of mourning. Defence minister Sánchez offered condolences to the victims of the accident, expressing that "this event is profoundly painful for the country," adding that "we hope that our prayers can help to relieve some of the pain". Sánchez further noted that the aircraft involved was airworthy at the time of the crash and that the crew was "duly qualified." The Military Forces of Colombia expressed their condolences to the victims of the crash, mentioning that their passing was "a source of grief for the Armed Forces and the entire country".

Colombian President Gustavo Petro, released a statement on X, calling the crash "horrendous" and one that "should not have happened". He continued, stressing his efforts to modernize the country's military, blaming "bureaucratic problems" from accelerating the effort further. He said that he did not want additional delays in the plans and threatened that any civilian or military officials would be removed from office, claiming that "it is the lives of ‌our young people that are at stake." Also Petro later commended the civilian first responders saying, "that is how a homeland is built".

The next day, Petro further condemned the United States by calling the C-130 involved an "extremely expensive" and "crappy gift", blaming the previous administration for accepting donated equipment and calling on the army to not defend the plane due to it costing more to maintain than buying a new one, claiming "what doesn't serve them, they give away—and the 'gift' ends up costing more than buying it new" and asked "how much are the lost lives worth?" In response, Iván Duque, the former president, defended his administration's handling of the armed forces by pointing to the fact that the C-130 was operated by many countries globally and noted that maintenance protocols were carried out on the aircraft before it was donated to Colombia. Additionally, he scrutinized Petro for his statements on social media just hours after the tragedy, instead calling for him to restrain from making comments during ongoing investigations. Leading candidates involved in the upcoming 2026 Colombian presidential election called for an investigation into the crash as well as offered their condolences.

=== International ===
A Lockheed Martin spokesperson released a statement that the company was committed to helping the country by aiding in the investigation of the crash. Government officials from Panama, Ecuador, Spain, and Venezuela offered and expressed their condolences to the government and people of Colombia, as well as the victims of the crash and their families.

== See also ==
- 2026 in aviation
- List of accidents and incidents involving the Lockheed C-130 Hercules
