= LATAM Airlines Perú Flight 2213 =

2022 aviation accident in Peru

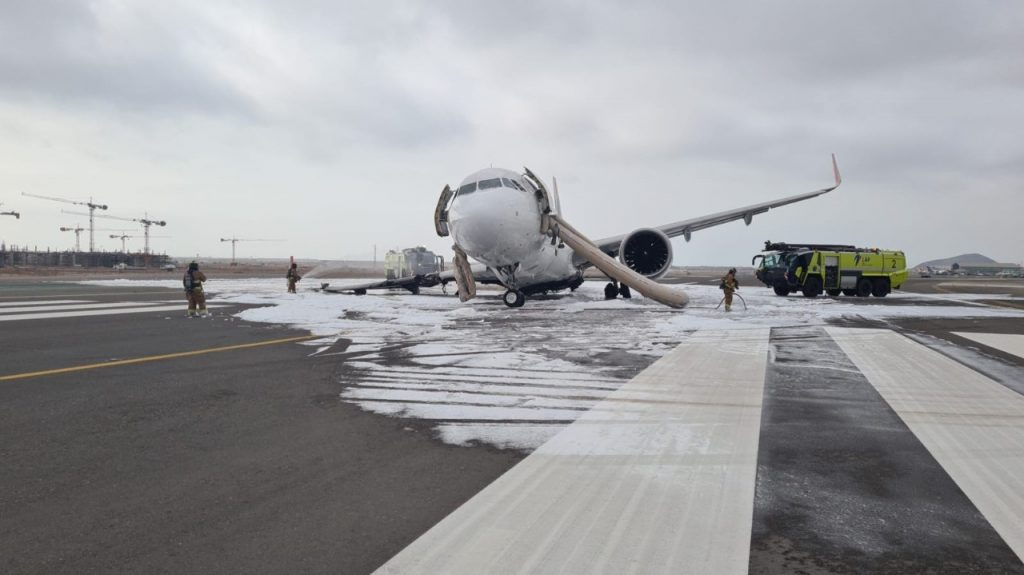
- The damage to the aircraft after colliding with the fire engine

Accident
- Date: 18 November 2022
- Summary: Collision with fire engine during takeoff
- Site: Jorge Chávez International Airport, Lima, Peru; 12°01′19″S 77°06′52″W
- Total fatalities: 3
- Total injuries: 40

Aircraft
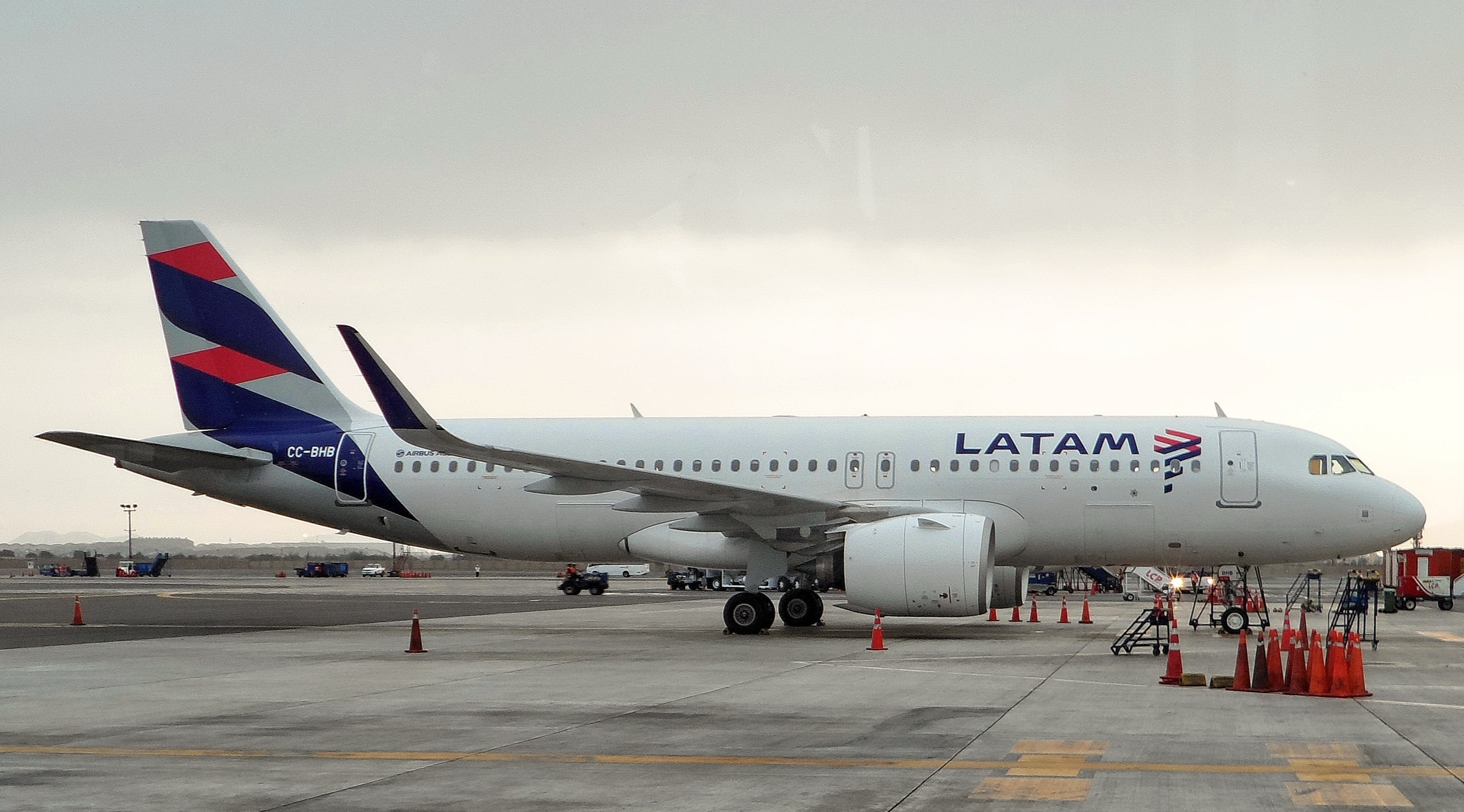
- CC-BHB, the aircraft involved in the accident, pictured in 2018
- Aircraft type: Airbus A320-271N (Note: The 2 in the suffix denotes that it was a -200 series variant of the A320; 71 denotes that it was equipped with Pratt & Whitney PW1127G-JM engines; N denotes that it was a neo or New Engine Option aircraft.)
- Operator: LATAM Perú on behalf of LATAM Chile
- IATA flight No.: LP2213
- ICAO flight No.: LPE2213
- Call sign: LAN PERÚ 2213
- Registration: CC-BHB
- Flight origin: Jorge Chávez International Airport, Lima, Peru
- Destination: Inca Manco Cápac International Airport, Juliaca, Peru
- Occupants: 108
- Passengers: 102
- Crew: 6
- Fatalities: 0
- Injuries: 40
- Survivors: 108

Ground casualties
- Ground fatalities: 3

LATAM Airlines Perú Flight 2213 was a scheduled domestic passenger flight originating from Jorge Chávez International Airport, Lima, Peru, to Inca Manco Cápac International Airport, Juliaca, Peru. On 18 November 2022, the Airbus A320neo collided with a fire engine during its takeoff roll, killing two firefighters and seriously injuring a third, who died of his injuries seven months later. Forty passengers and crew members were injured, 4 serious and 36 minor. The aircraft was substantially damaged and was written off, marking it the first hull loss of the A320neo family.

== Background ==
=== Aircraft ===
The aircraft involved was a five-year-old Airbus A320-271N with manufacturer serial number 7864, registered as CC-BHB. It was delivered to LATAM Chile in November 2017. The aircraft was powered by two Pratt & Whitney PW1127G engines. The aircraft was damaged beyond repair and was subsequently written off. It was the first hull loss of an A320neo.

=== Crew ===
The captain, aged 35, had logged 8,229 flight hours, including 3,115 hours on the Airbus A320 family of aircraft. The first officer, aged 30, had 3,390 flight hours, with 583 of them on the Airbus A320 family of aircraft.

== Accident ==
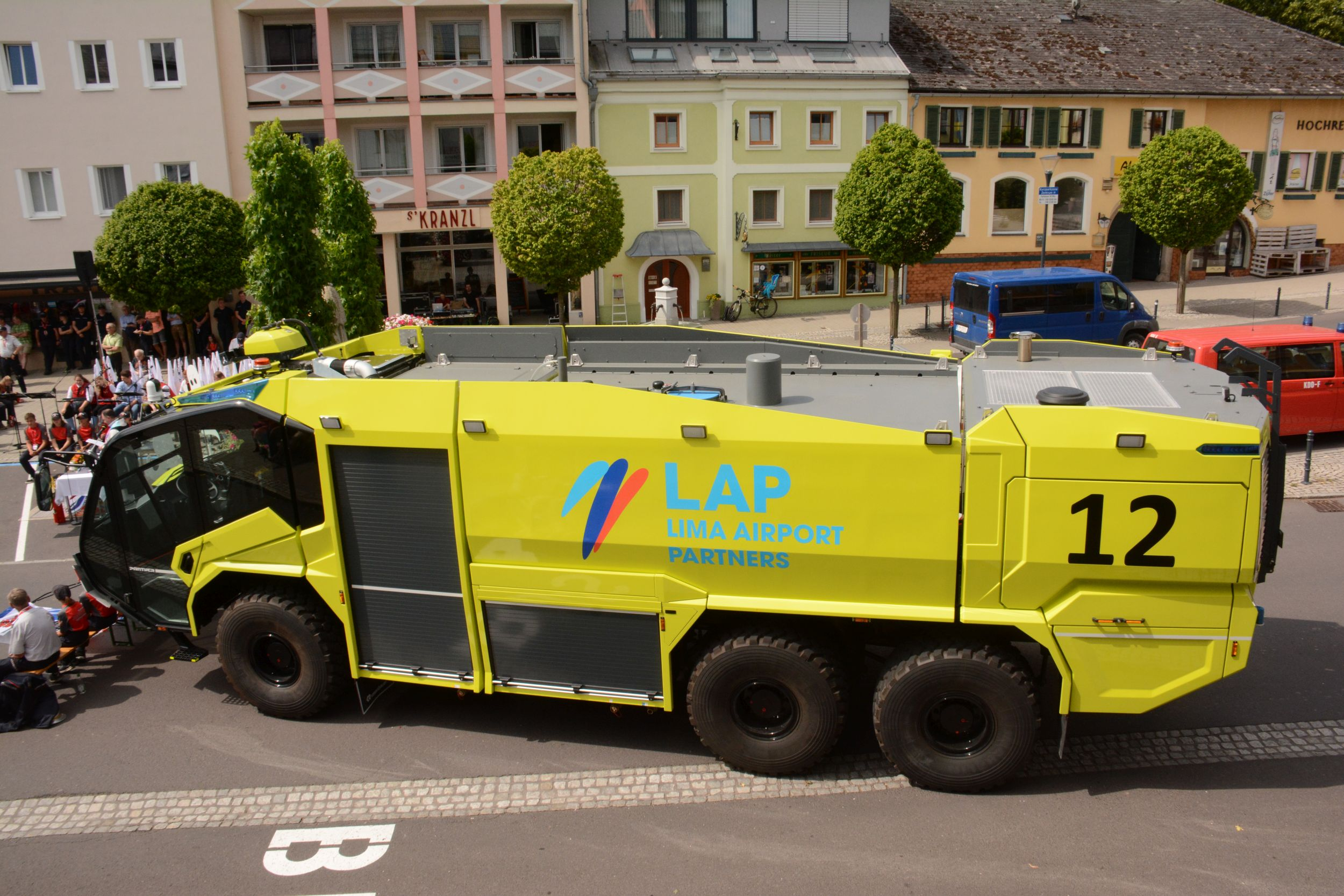
An airport crash tender of Jorge Chávez International Airport similar to the vehicle involved in the collision

LATAM Airlines Perú Flight 2213 was scheduled to depart Jorge Chávez International Airport in Lima at 14:55 PET (19:55 UTC) and arrive at Inca Manco Cápac International Airport in Juliaca at 16:30 PET (21:30 UTC). The weather at Jorge Chávez Airport at the time reported a 10-knot (19 km/h; 12 mph) southerly wind, visibility of at least 10 km (5.4 nmi; 6.2 mi), and a broken cloud layer at 2,100 ft (640 m).

The aircraft commenced its take-off on runway 16 at 15:11. During the take-off roll, multiple airport crash tenders and fire engines on a planned emergency drill crossed the runway in front of the accelerating aircraft. The pilots rejected the takeoff in an attempt to avoid a collision but still ended up hitting one of the firetrucks, which had also turned to avoid the collision. A video posted on social media showed the moment the aircraft impacted the truck, with the aircraft's right engine separating and the right landing gear collapsing. Another video posted on social media showed the plane tipped over to its right side as it moved across the runway on fire as it stopped. The aircraft came to rest 2,500 metres (8,200 ft) down the runway. Several photos of the aftermath showed a destroyed fire engine and the aircraft resting on its right wing with fire damage to the rear fuselage.

== Aftermath ==
As a result of the accident Lima Airport Partners suspended all operations at the airport until 20 November.

The pilots of the aircraft were arrested soon after the accident and held in custody for 24 hours, prompting the International Federation of Air Line Pilots' Associations (IFALPA) to criticize the Peruvian government for acting contrary to International Civil Aviation Organization guidelines, saying that the arrest and detention were "extremely detrimental to flight safety and can only hinder the investigation." IFALPA also said that the arrest could create the public impression that the accident was intentionally caused by the pilots rather than by "technical issues or a string of errors originating from multiple factors."

Air traffic control had given the LATAM crew clearance to take off. Lima's Airport Authority coordinated an emergency drill with the Air Traffic Authority. The exercise began at 15:10 local time, and the LATAM aircraft hit the truck at 15:11. Air traffic control (ATC) confirmed the start of the exercise. The rescue team was under the impression that their drill clearance also included crossing the active runway which was not the case.

Firefighter Manuel Villanueva, the only survivor of the three-man fire engine crew, succumbed to his injuries on 17 June 2023, making him the third fatality of the accident.

== Investigation ==
The accident was investigated by the Commission for the Investigation of Aviation Accidents (CIAA) with assistance from the French Bureau of Enquiry and Analysis for Civil Aviation Safety (BEA). The flight recorders were to be sent to France for analysis, but were instead sent to Brazil's Aeronautical Accidents Investigation and Prevention Center (CENIPA).

On October 2, 2023, the CIAA released their final report, which concluded that the crash had been the result of the aircraft rescue and firefighting (ARFF) vehicles entering the runway without express permission while conducting an emergency drill. The drill had been poorly planned, and coordination regarding it was poor between Lima Airport ARFF and the Peruvian Corporation of Commercial Airports and Aviation (CORPAC) air traffic control. The CORPAC air traffic controllers had only been notified of the drill about an hour before it occurred, resulting in them having limited information. In addition, the communication between ATC and emergency responders used nonstandard terminology. Contributing factors included poor communication and coordination, a lack of meetings between Lima Airport and CORPAC to assess hazards, and imprecise or unclear language used by ARFF conducting the drill.

== See also ==
- List of accidents and incidents involving commercial aircraft
- Ozark Air Lines Flight 650 – Struck a snowplow on landing, severely damaging aircraft.
- Aeroflot Flight 3352 – Struck maintenance vehicles on landing resulting in crash.
- Western Airlines Flight 2605 – Struck runway construction equipment on landing resulting in a vehicle collision and crash.
- Emirates SkyCargo Flight 9788 – Struck a ground vehicle during a runway excursion.
- Air Canada Express Flight 8646 – Struck a fire truck after landing.
