= Air Canada Express Flight 8646 =

2026 aviation accident in New York, U.S.

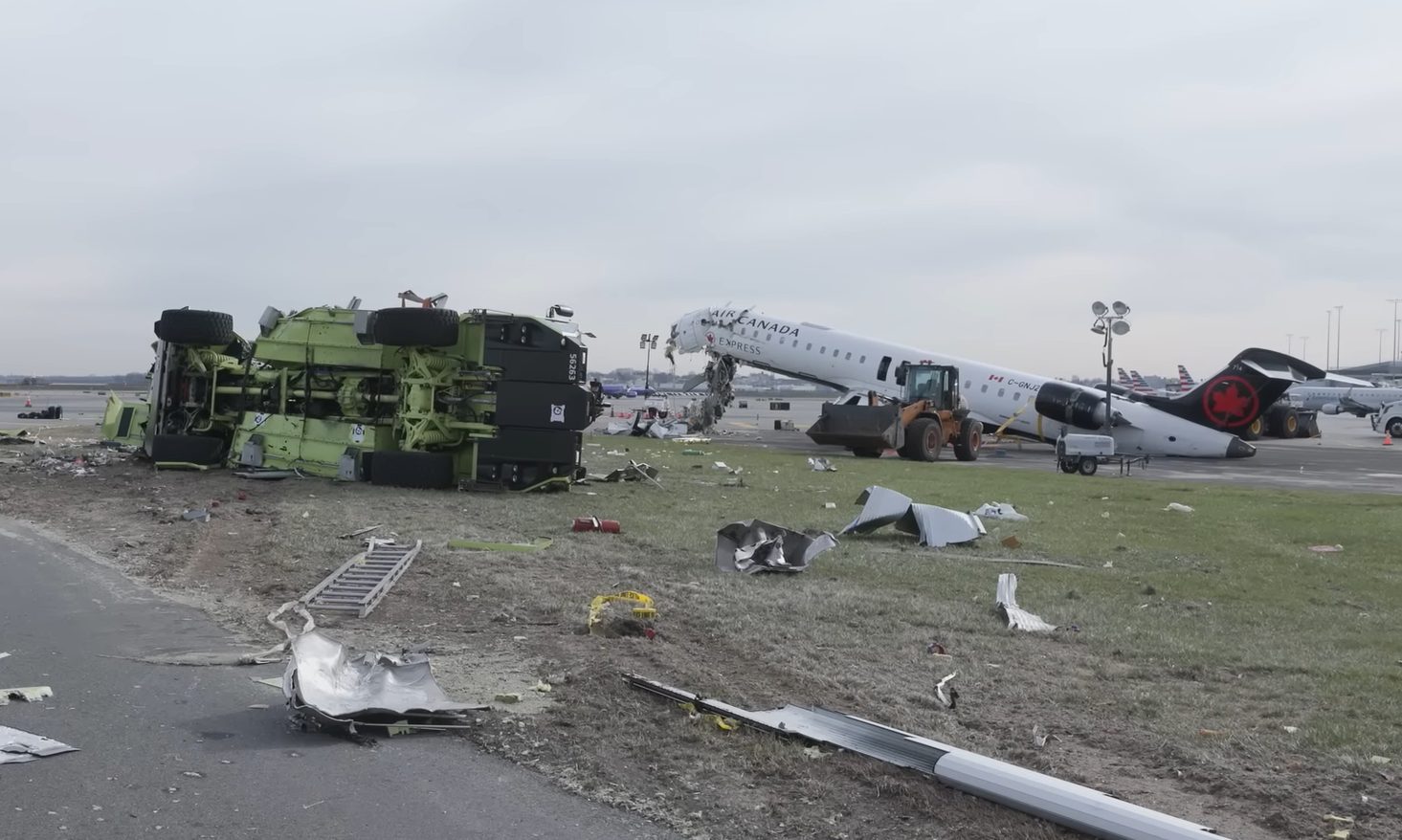
- The airport fire truck and aircraft after the accident

Accident
- Date: March 22, 2026
- Summary: Collided with an airport firefighting truck while landing; under investigation
- Site: LaGuardia Airport, New York City, United States; 40°46′32″N 73°52′44″W
- Total fatalities: 2
- Total injuries: 39

Aircraft
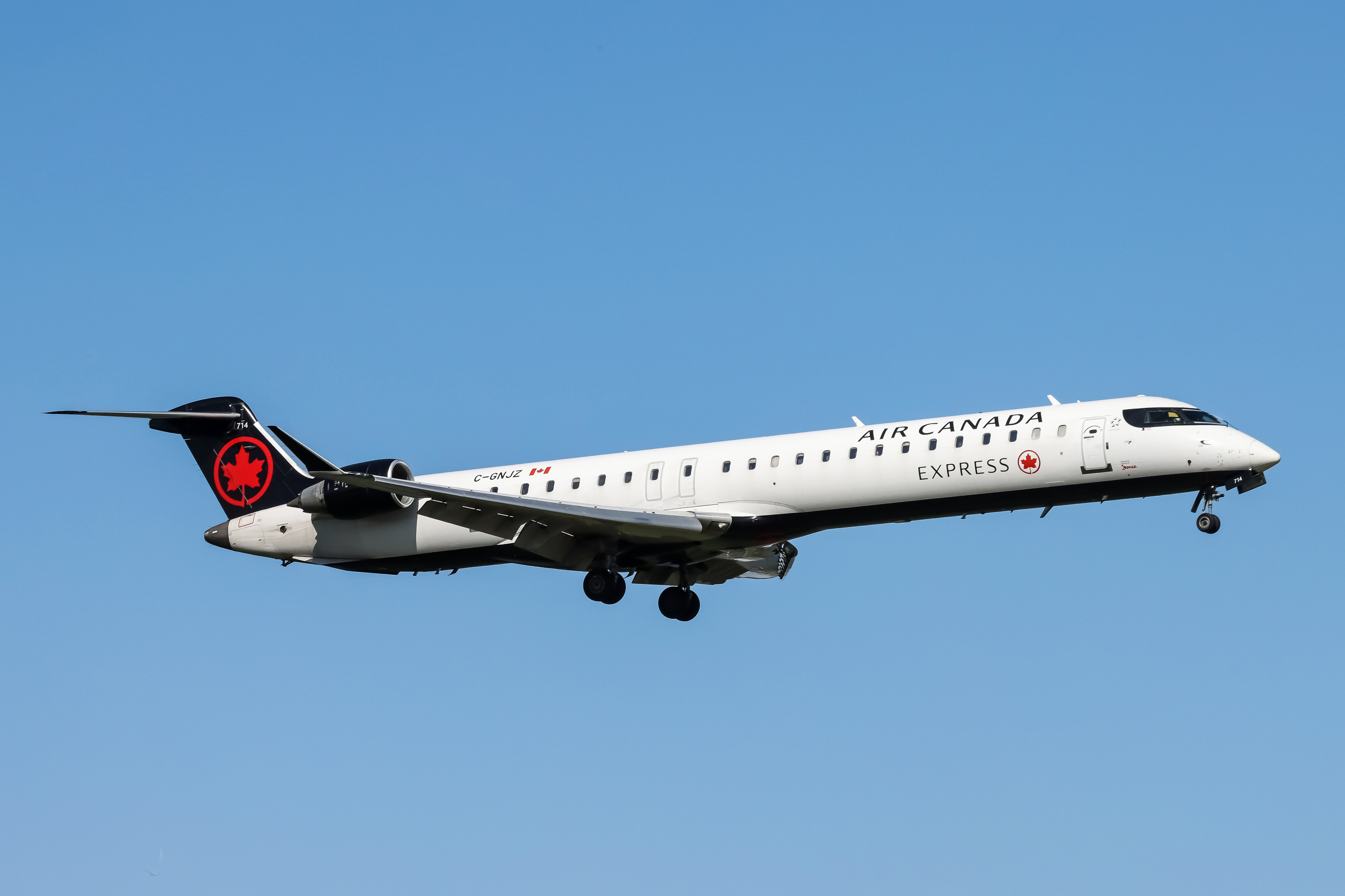
- C-GNJZ, the aircraft involved in the accident, seen in 2022
- Aircraft type: Bombardier CRJ900
- Operator: Jazz Aviation on behalf of Air Canada Express
- IATA flight No.: QK8646/AC8646
- ICAO flight No.: JZA646
- Call sign: JAZZ 646
- Registration: C-GNJZ
- Flight origin: Montréal–Trudeau International Airport, Dorval, Quebec, Canada
- Destination: LaGuardia Airport, New York City, United States
- Occupants: 76
- Passengers: 72
- Crew: 4
- Fatalities: 2
- Injuries: 37
- Survivors: 74

Ground casualties
- Ground injuries: 2
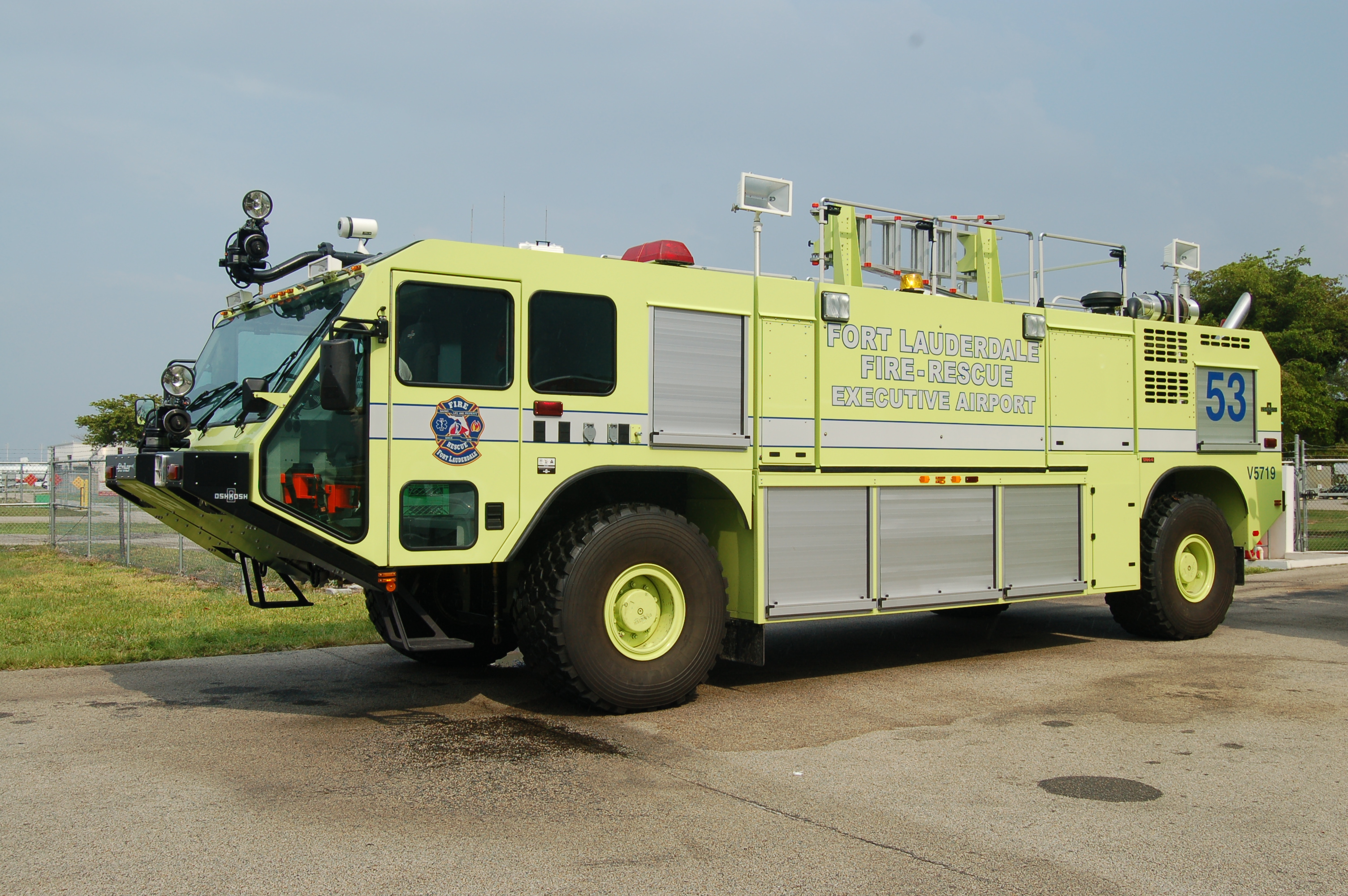
- An Oshkosh Striker 1500 similar to the truck involved in the accident

Air Canada Express Flight 8646 was a regularly scheduled international passenger flight from Montréal–Trudeau International Airport in Quebec, Canada, to LaGuardia Airport in New York City, United States. The flight was operated by Jazz Aviation, an airline operating regional flights on behalf of Air Canada under the brand Air Canada Express. On the night of March 22, 2026, the Bombardier CRJ900 serving the flight experienced a runway incursion with a LaGuardia airport firefighting truck operated by the Port Authority of New York and New Jersey. The truck was crossing the runway to reach an unrelated emergency event as the CRJ900 landed, resulting in a ground collision. The aircraft's cockpit and forward galley sections were destroyed, killing both pilots, while a flight attendant, who was seated on a jump-seat near the cockpit, was injured as she was ejected onto the runway. Thirty-nine people, including passengers, crew, and both occupants of the truck, were injured following the collision; nine remained under medical care the following day. Flight 8646 was the first fatal accident at LaGuardia in 34 years, since USAir Flight 405 crashed on the same day in 1992.

== Background ==
=== Aircraft ===
The aircraft involved in the accident was a 20-year-old Bombardier CRJ900LR operated by Jazz Aviation on behalf of Air Canada Express, registered as C-GNJZ. It was delivered new to the airline in late 2005. The aircraft was configured for regional passenger service and was typically used on short— to medium—haul routes within Canada, and between Canada and the United States. It was powered by two General Electric CF34-8C5 turbofan engines.

=== Passengers and crew ===
There were 76 people on board, including 72 passengers and 4 crew members. The pilots were 30-year-old Captain Antoine Forest of Coteau-du-Lac, Quebec, and 24-year-old First Officer Mackenzie Gunther of Ottawa, Ontario.

=== Firefighting truck ===
The airport firefighting truck was an Oshkosh Striker 1500 identified as Truck 1 (marked Truck 35 on the vehicle), and it was operated by the Aircraft Rescue and Firefighting (ARFF) unit of the Port Authority of New York and New Jersey Police Department.

=== Weather ===
About three hours before the accident, LaGuardia Airport posted on X that weather conditions caused flight disruptions. Heavy rain was reported across the New York City area, with water being seen on the tarmac of LaGuardia Airport. Additionally, visibility was reduced to 3 mi (4.8 km).

=== Airport and air traffic control ===
Two air traffic controllers were working at the airport at the time, although both were working two positions each as part of a nighttime shift. An additional two controllers were present at the airport, but not on duty inside the control room. The airport controllers were not affected by the 2026 second partial government shutdown over Department of Homeland Security funding.

== Accident ==
LaGuardia ATC transmissions (expand to view captions)

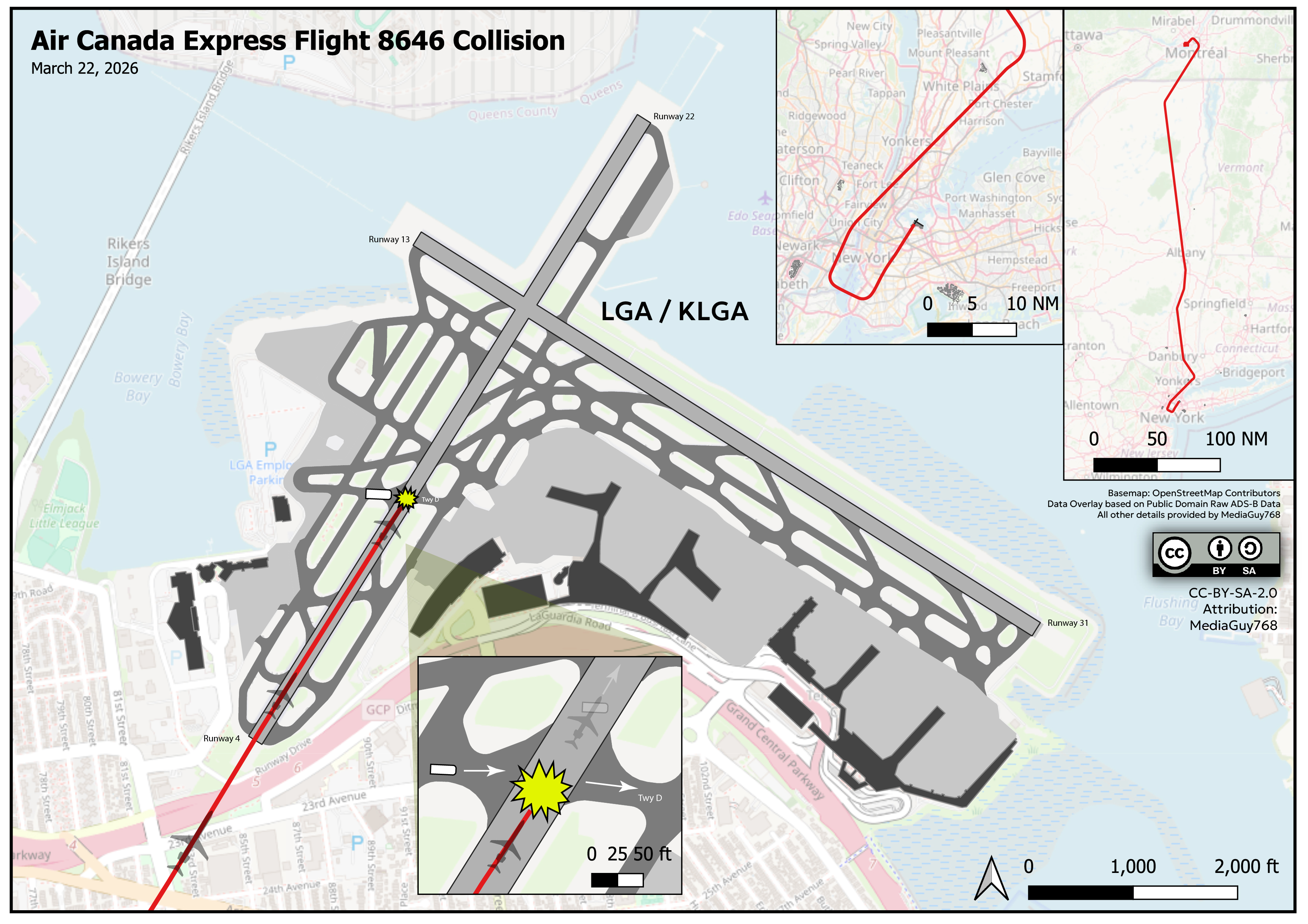
Diagram of the flight path over LaGuardia

The aircraft departed Montréal–Trudeau International Airport in Montreal at 10:12 p.m. EDT, having been delayed over two hours, en route to LaGuardia Airport in New York City.

At 11:18 p.m., United Airlines Flight 2384, a Boeing 737 MAX 8 bound for O'Hare International Airport in Chicago, aborted its takeoff from LaGuardia twice after anti-ice warning lights came on, and declared an emergency after the crew noticed a foul odor in the cabin. Without an open gate for the United flight, an airport firefighting truck and a stair truck were dispatched to assist Flight 2384.

At 11:37 p.m., air traffic control (ATC) cleared "Truck 1 and company" to cross runway 4 at taxiway Delta while the Air Canada Express aircraft was on short final. The controller could then be heard telling another aircraft, Frontier 4195, to stop. Immediately thereafter, the controller issued multiple radio transmissions telling Truck 1 to stop, just seconds after clearing it across the runway where the collision would occur. ATC audio later released by media outlets captured a controller saying "I messed up" on the frequency shortly after the collision; a Frontier Airlines pilot who saw the collision radioed telling the controller, "[...] you did the best you could". It also captured the moment of the initial and the second call to Truck 1: "Frontier 4195, just stop there please. Stop, stop, stop, stop, Truck 1, stop, stop, stop. Stop, Truck 1."

At 11:38 p.m., the aircraft collided with the truck while landing. The aircraft's last recorded ground speed before the collision was 90 knots (170 km/h; 100 mph). ATC dispatched additional airport firefighting trucks to the scene, along with a response from the New York City Fire Department (FDNY) and New York City Police Department (NYPD). Footage of the aftermath showed the aircraft, which came to rest in the area of taxiway E, tilted upwards and the cockpit and front galley of the aircraft destroyed.

Security camera video shows the aircraft striking the rear-right side of the truck with significant force, causing the truck to roll over. It appears the truck driver saw the jet just before impact and unsuccessfully tried to turn out of the way. Passengers on the plane described feeling the aircraft brake hard immediately after touchdown, followed by a loud bang that threw people against their seats and into the cabin interior. Some passengers reported head injuries and bleeding, and said that they assisted in opening an emergency exit and helping others evacuate down the wing. A passenger told reporters that the pilots "kind of saved our lives" by braking extremely hard just after touchdown, saying he believed the pilot had "incredible reflexes".

== Victims ==
The captain and first officer, Antoine Forest and Mackenzie Gunther, were killed as the front of the jet crumpled, while 35 passengers, both flight attendants, and both occupants of the firefighting truck were injured.

One flight attendant was seated in a jump seat located behind the cockpit door. She was ejected from the aircraft and found over 330 feet (100 m) away from the wreckage. She survived and sustained two shattered legs, a fractured spine, and abrasions.

The two occupants of the ARFF truck, a Port Authority police officer and sergeant, suffered broken bones and were both transported to NewYork-Presbyterian Queens in critical but non-life-threatening condition.

Victims were transported to either Elmhurst Hospital or NewYork-Presbyterian Queens, both of which are level 1 trauma centers. Thirty-two of the injured were discharged shortly afterwards and nine were more seriously injured.

== Aftermath ==
NTSB video of the scene

The Federal Aviation Administration issued a ground stop at the airport. The airport was closed until 2 p.m. the following day. Many flights were diverted to nearby airports, mostly to John F. Kennedy International Airport and Newark Liberty International Airport. However, early on March 23, a ground stop was implemented at Newark due to smoke in the air traffic control tower, further straining air traffic in the New York metropolitan area. Runway 4/22, where the incident occurred, remained closed while investigators examined the debris field and reopened at approximately 10 a.m. EDT on March 26.

The bodies of the captain and first officer were repatriated to Canada on March 26.

On August 27, the FAA fired two controllers at LaGuardia for ending their shifts early before the accident, resulting in ATC being short staffed. It is currently unclear if this played a role in the accident.

== Investigation ==
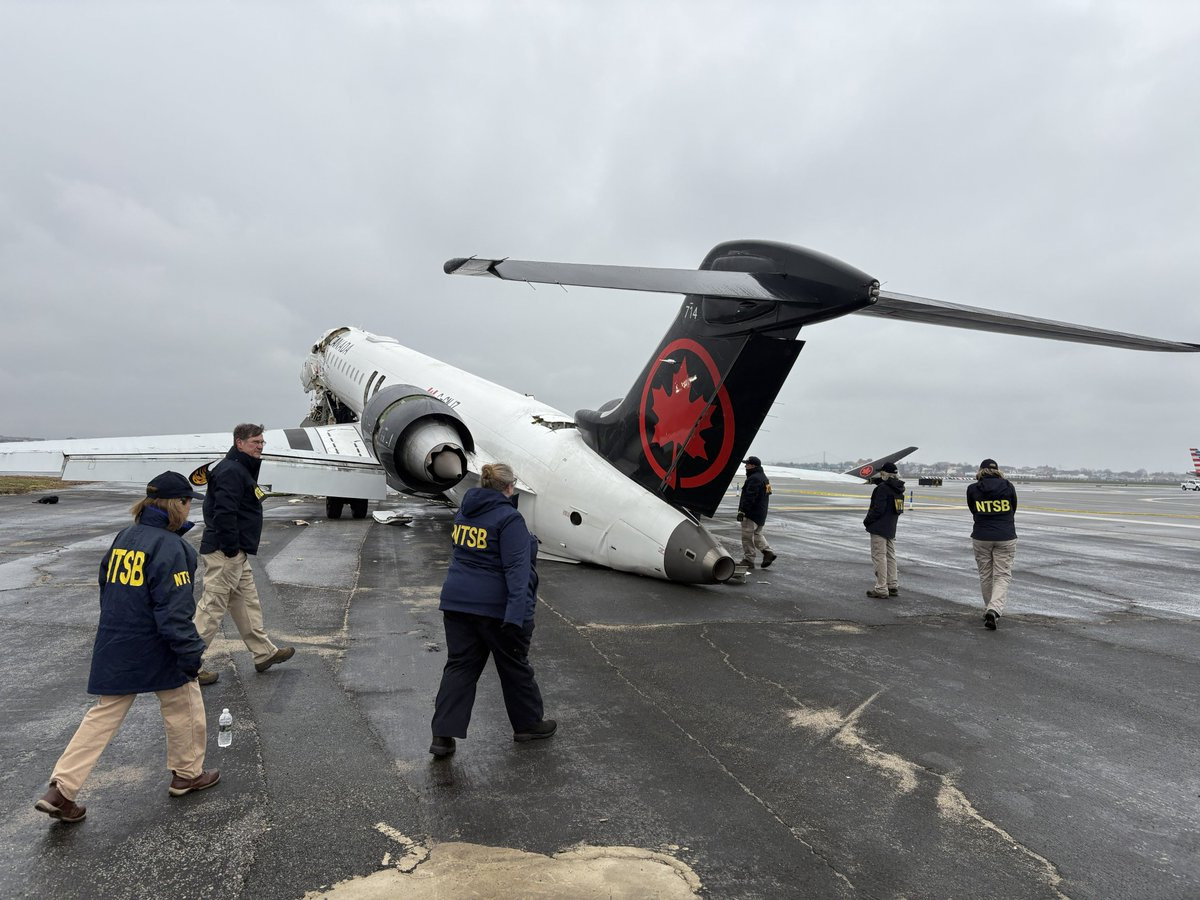
NTSB investigators at the scene

The National Transportation Safety Board (NTSB) sent a team to investigate the crash. The Transportation Safety Board of Canada, in accordance with international agreements, also dispatched investigators to assist the NTSB investigation. The NTSB subsequently noted the firefighting truck was not equipped with an ASDE-X transponder. The NTSB released a preliminary report on April 23.

== Response ==
US President Donald Trump called the crash "terrible" and referred to the aviation industry as "a dangerous business". Mayor of New York City Zohran Mamdani described the incident as "tragic."

Canada's Minister of Transport Steven MacKinnon said he had spoken with his American counterpart and that Canadian officials were in New York "to get to the bottom" of the accident, while offering condolences to those affected.

Prominent Canadians including MacKinnon and Prime Minister Mark Carney issued statements condemning Michael Rousseau, the chief executive officer of Air Canada, for posting an official corporate video on X expressing condolences almost entirely in English with French subtitles, rather than posting equivalent statements in both languages as required by the Official Languages Act. In response, Rousseau announced that he would retire later in 2026.

The Ministry of Foreign Affairs of the United Arab Emirates expressed condolences towards Canada and the United States, along with the victims' families.

== See also ==
- 2026 in aviation
- LATAM Airlines Perú Flight 2213
