= 2026 Uttarakhand helicopter crash =

2026 Indian aviation accident

- An Airbus H125, similar to the aircraft involved

Accident
- Date: 30 October 2026
- Site: Chaien village, Joshimath, Uttrakhand, India

Aircraft
- Aircraft type: Airbus Helicopters H125
- Operator: Trans Bharat Aviation Pvt
- Registration: VT-HCX
- Flight origin: Badrinath
- Destination: Sahastradhara helipad, Dehradun
- Occupants: 6
- Passengers: 5
- Crew: 1
- Fatalities: 6
- Survivors: 0

On 30 October 2026, a Airbus Helicopters H125 operated by Trans Bharat aviation crashed near Joshimath, India.

== Accident ==
The helicopter involved in the crash took off from Badrinath at around 1:14 pm destined for the Sahastradhara helipad in Dehradun. Badrinath is an important pilgrimage center during the Char Dham yatra for Hindus. The helicopter was flying in heavy snowfall when contact was lost near Hathi Parbat. When the helicopter failed to reach its destination, two teams from the Indian Army, the Indo-Tibetan Border Police, the district administration and SDRF were mobilised to conduct search and rescue operations, when an Indian Army observation post reported a stray helicopter flying into a valley about one kilometre above the Ghanta Khad temple near Pandukeshwar. Two IAF helicopters and Drones were mobilised and located the crash site in a densely forested area near Chaien village in Joshimath. As a precaution, all the helicopter fleet of Trans Bharat were temporarily grounded.

== Casualties ==
There were five passengers from Karnataka on the flight. All six were killed in the crash. Fake claims, backed by Pakistani accounts spread on social media portraying it as a terrorist attack on an aircraft carrying the family of Lieutenant General Sanjay Mitra.

== Investigation ==
India's Aircraft Accident Investigation Bureau launched an investigation into the accident.

== See also ==
- 2026 Baramati Learjet 45 crash
- 2011 Pawan Hans Mi-17 crash
