= VSR Ventures =

Indian private airline

- Founded: 2009
- Commenced operations: April 21, 2014
- Fleet size: 17
- Headquarters: New Delhi, India
- Key people: V. K. Singh; Rohit Singh
- Founder: V. K. Singh
- Website: https://vsraviation.com/

VSR Ventures Pvt Ltd (operating under the brand VSR Aviation) is an Indian private airline based in New Delhi and one of the largest business aviation operators in the country. The company specializes in providing aircraft for VIP charter flights and medical evacuation (air ambulance). Its fleet consists of 17 aircraft, making it one of the largest operators of business jets in India, particularly of Learjet aircraft. The company gained widespread notoriety following a series of high-profile incidents, including the 2026 crash that killed Maharashtra Deputy Chief Minister Ajit Pawar, which led to extensive investigations, regulatory sanctions, and a political scandal.

== History ==
The company was founded in 2009. At its inception was pilot Vijay Kumar Singh, who previously worked as Director of Aviation for the Bharat Hotels chain and later for Air Charter Services. The initial fleet consisted of one Pilatus aircraft and one Beechcraft B200. The company received its first Air Operator Permit on April 21, 2014, as a Non-Scheduled Operator Permit holder under number 07/2014.

In subsequent years, VSR Ventures rapidly expanded its fleet, focusing on Learjet 45 business jets and ultimately becoming one of the largest operators of this aircraft type in the country. The company was willing to provide services on credit for government and political clients with long payment cycles, which ensured a steady stream of VIP charter orders. Its operator permit was last renewed on April 3, 2023, and is valid until April 20, 2028. According to the latest DGCA regulatory inspection in February 2025, no level-one findings were identified. According to financial reports, for the 2024 fiscal year, the company's revenue stood at 295.86 crore rupees, with a net profit of 12.51 crore rupees.

== Fleet ==
As of early 2026, according to the official PIB release, VSR Ventures' fleet consists of 17 aircraft.

VSR Ventures fleet
Type	Quantity	Notes
Learjet 45	7	One aircraft (VT-SSK) crashed in the 2026 in Baramati. Four aircraft (VT-VRA, VT-VRS, VT-VRC, VT-TRI) were grounded by DGCA in February 2026.
Embraer 135BJ	5	Light business jets.
Beechcraft King Air B200	4	Turboprop aircraft.
Pilatus PC-12	1	Single-engine turboprop aircraft.

== Accidents and incidents ==
=== The VT-DBL incident in Mumbai (2023) ===
On September 14, 2023, a Learjet 45 aircraft registered as VT-DBL, operating a flight from Visakhapatnam to Mumbai, suffered an accident while landing at Chhatrapati Shivaji Maharaj International Airport. During the approach to runway 27 in heavy rain and poor visibility, the autopilot disconnected 40 seconds before touchdown, after which "stall" and "terrain" warnings sounded in the cockpit. The aircraft veered right of the runway and made a hard landing at the intersection of taxiways W and N, resulting in its destruction. On board were 2 crew members and 6 passengers. The co-pilot sustained serious injuries, while the captain and all passengers received minor injuries. The investigation into the incident by the AAIB remained unfinished after two and a half years, which later became a reason for international sanctions against the company.

=== The VT-SSK crash in Baramati (2026) ===
On January 28, 2026, a Learjet 45 aircraft registered as VT-SSK, operating a charter flight from Mumbai to Baramati, crashed while on approach to Baramati Airport. There were 5 people on board: two pilots, a flight attendant, and two passengers, including the Deputy Chief Minister of Maharashtra, Ajit Pawar. All of them died.

According to the AAIB's preliminary report, the crew made two approaches to runway 11 in poor visibility (approximately 3000 meters, below the established minimum for a visual approach) and in the absence of meteorological equipment at the airfield. After the pilots reported sighting the runway, the controller cleared them for landing at 08:43, but no readback from the crew followed. At 08:44, controllers observed a flash near the runway threshold — the aircraft had crashed approximately 50 meters to the left of the runway, after hitting trees, and was completely destroyed.

=== Other Incidents ===
In March 2026, during the investigation into the Baramati crash and the ensuing scandal surrounding the company, politician Rohit Pawar brought to light information about another serious incident involving a VSR Ventures aircraft. According to his statement, on January 20, 2023, a company aircraft was operating a flight carrying the then Chief Minister of Maharashtra, Eknath Shinde, to participate in an economic forum in Davos, Switzerland. The flight route was such that the aircraft entered the airspace of Iran and Iraq without having obtained the necessary overflight permissions in advance. In response to the violation, Iranian and Iraqi fighter jets were scrambled to intercept, threatening action, which forced the crew to urgently change course from Bahrain to Zurich. Pawar cited this incident as confirmation of systematic and gross violations by the company.

== Scandals ==
=== EASA Sanctions ===
In December 2024, the European Union Aviation Safety Agency (EASA) suspended the Third Country Operator (TCO) certificate for VSR Ventures. The sanctions were imposed because the company failed to respond to EASA's requests for information regarding the investigation into the VT-DBL aircraft accident in Mumbai in September 2023. This certificate, which VSR Ventures had held since 2020, is required to conduct commercial flights within European Union airspace.

=== DGCA Actions and Aircraft Grounding ===
Following the Baramati crash, India's Directorate General of Civil Aviation (DGCA) conducted an unscheduled special safety audit of the company. A multi-disciplinary audit team identified numerous discrepancies from approved procedures in the areas of airworthiness maintenance, flight safety, and flight operations. Based on these violations, on February 24, 2026, the DGCA ordered the immediate grounding of four Learjet 40/45 aircraft, registered as VT-VRA, VT-VRS, VT-VRV, and VT-TRI, until airworthiness standards are restored. The operator was issued directives to conduct a root cause analysis of the violations.

=== Political Fallout ===
The crash that claimed the life of Ajit Pawar triggered a major political scandal. His son, Jay Pawar, demanded the immediate suspension of all VSR Ventures flights and a thorough investigation into potential lapses in the company's aircraft maintenance, questioning official statements that the "black boxes" could not have been destroyed so quickly. Ajit Pawar's widow, Sunetra Pawar, appealed to the government to transfer the crash investigation to the Central Bureau of Investigation (CBI).

Rohit Pawar accused the DGCA of attempting to give the company a "clean chit" on the very day of the crash, when the authority released a report showing no violations by VSR following its February 2025 inspection, even before Ajit Pawar's body had reached the morgue. He also demanded action against the owner of VSR and DGCA officials, accused leaders of the Telugu Desam Party (TDP) of having financial links with the company and trying to protect it, and called for the resignation of Civil Aviation Minister Kinjarapu Ram Mohan Naidu.

Shiv Sena (UBT) leader Sanjay Raut criticized the government and regulators. He accused the authorities of covering up the case and labeled the DGCA "the most corrupt government institution" and a "contract killer," alleging that many ministers have financial connections to VSR. Raut also linked the Telugu Desam Party and Minister Naidu to VSR and suggested that one of the company's aircraft might belong to Chief Minister Devendra Fadnavis.

A spokesperson for the Bharatiya Janata Party (BJP), Navnath Ban, rejected the allegations against the Chief Minister, demanding an apology and evidence from Raut, and threatening legal action.

The Shiv Sena faction led by Deputy Chief Minister Eknath Shinde announced its decision to stop using VSR Ventures aircraft for its travel.

In early March 2026, Jay Pawar released a video allegedly showing the VSR owner's son, Rohit Singh, sleeping in the pilot's seat during a flight. He demanded Singh's arrest and the complete suspension of the company's certificate.

On March 4, 2026, Rohit Pawar claimed there were familial ties between the VSR owner and Minister Naidu, and pointed to company investments inflated by 17 crore rupees in an upscale Hyderabad area as possible financial irregularities. He also stated that during the COVID-19 pandemic, the company was banned in the United Arab Emirates for six months for extorting money from patients.

On March 5, 2026, Rohit Pawar presented new allegations: the company may have underreported flight hours to delay maintenance, leading to aircraft being operated beyond safe limits, and its rapid growth (from 10 to 500 crore rupees in nine years) might have been fueled by investments from shell companies. He also claimed that VSR owner V. K. Singh threatened his team, citing his connections "from top to bottom".

On March 5, 2026, VSR Ventures owner V. K. Singh was summoned for questioning by the Maharashtra Criminal Investigation Department (CID) in connection with the Baramati crash investigation. The questioning took place in Pune, with CID officials recording Singh's statement. Initially registered as an accident, the case is now also exploring possibilities of potential sabotage or criminal negligence that may have led to the deaths of Ajit Pawar and four others.

On March 13, 2026, Rohit Pawar leveled serious allegations against VSR Ventures owner V. K. Singh. In a post on his X account, he claimed that Singh was attempting to bribe several DGCA officials to edit the Flight Data Recorder (FDR) data from the aircraft that crashed in Baramati. The same day, another politician, Amol Mitkari from the NCP faction once led by Ajit Pawar, made a statement. He told reporters that, according to his information, V. K. Singh had taken a contract from the underworld to murder VIPs and politicians in Maharashtra. Mitkari urged all state politicians, including the Chief Minister, to stop using VSR Ventures' aircraft and use ground transportation instead, calling it dangerous.

According to Mitkari, Ajit Pawar's son, Jay Pawar, is now in a state of extreme alert and avoids using elevators, fearing that VSR Ventures could send hired assassins.

On March 18, 2026, Maharashtra Chief Minister Devendra Fadnavis formally wrote to Union Home Minister Amit Shah, demanding a transparent investigation into the Baramati crash. The letter listed concerns raised by Rohit Pawar, including VSR Ventures' safety record and past incidents.
