= Tres de Mayo Airport =

Tres de Mayo Airport Aeropuerto Tres de Mayo
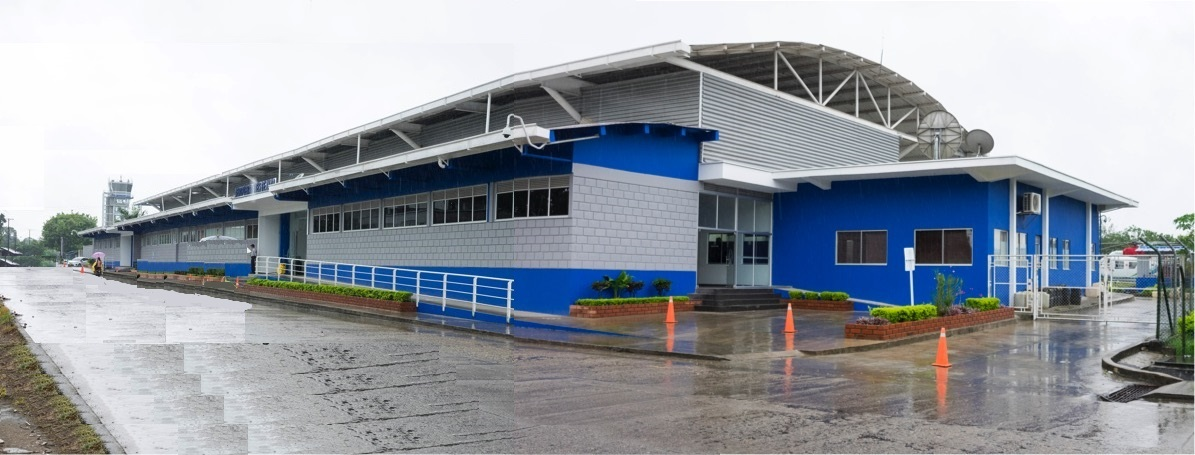
- IATA: PUU; ICAO: SKAS

Summary
- Airport type: Public
- Location: Puerto Asís, Colombia
- Elevation AMSL: 815 ft / 248 m
- Coordinates: 0°30′20″N 76°30′03″W

Map
- Location of airport in Colombia

Runways
Direction	Length		Surface
Direction	m	ft	Surface
01/19	1,625	5,331	Asphalt
- Sources: GCM Google Maps

Tres de Mayo Airport (IATA: PUU, ICAO: SKAS) is an airport serving the city of Puerto Asís in the Putumayo District of Colombia.

Runway 01 has a 140 metres (460 ft) displaced threshold. The Puerto Asis non-directional beacon (Ident: SIS) is located on the field.

== Airlines and destinations ==
Airlines	Destinations
SATENA	Bogota, Cali, Ipiales, Puerto Leguízamo

== See also ==
- Transport in Colombia
- List of airports in Colombia
