= Puerto Leguízamo =

Place in Putumayo Department, Colombia

Coordinates: 0°11′38″S 74°46′50″W

Puerto Leguizamo
- Municipality and town
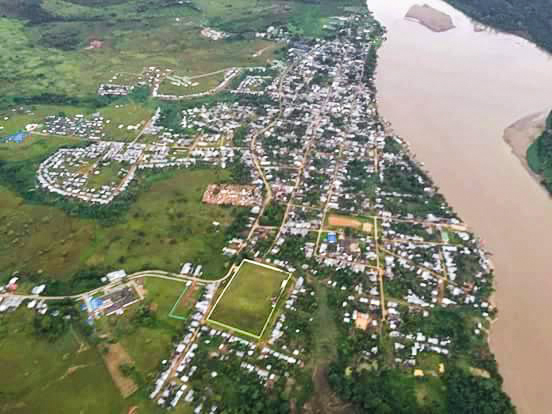
- Aerial view of the town

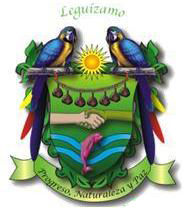
- Flag Coat of arms

- Location of the municipality and town of Puerto Leguízamo in the Putumayo Department of Colombia
- Country: Colombia
- Department: Putumayo Department

Area
  - Municipality and town: 10,907 km^{2} (4,211 sq mi)
  - Urban: 2.13 km^{2} (0.82 sq mi)
- Elevation: 177 m (581 ft)

Population (2018 census)
  - Municipality and town: 28,468
  - Density: 2.6101/km^{2} (6.7600/sq mi)
  - Urban: 12,755
  - Urban density: 5,990/km^{2} (15,500/sq mi)
- Time zone: UTC-5 (Colombia Standard Time)

Puerto Leguízamo (Spanish pronunciation: [ˈpweɾto le'ɣisamo]) is a town and municipality located in the Putumayo Department, a southern border region of Colombia. It is on the north bank of the Putumayo River.

Its Catedral Nuestra Señora del Carmen, dedicated to Our Lady of Mount Carmel, is the cathedral episcopal see of the Latin Catholic missionary pre-diocesan Apostolic Vicariate of Puerto Leguízamo-Solano.

Puerto Leguízamo is served by Caucayá Airport.

In 2026, a Lockheed C-130 crashed in the nearby forest after departing from Caucayá Airport, killing 69 out of 126 occupants.

== Climate ==
Located just a few kilometres south of the equator, Puerto Leguízamo has a tropical rainforest climate (Af) with heavy to very heavy rainfall year-round.

Climate data for Puerto Leguízamo (Pto Leguizamo), elevation 147 m (482 ft), (1981–2010)
Month	Jan	Feb	Mar	Apr	May	Jun	Jul	Aug	Sep	Oct	Nov	Dec	Year
Mean daily maximum °C (°F)	31.9 (89.4)	31.7 (89.1)	31.1 (88.0)	30.4 (86.7)	29.8 (85.6)	29.1 (84.4)	29.3 (84.7)	30.3 (86.5)	31.2 (88.2)	31.4 (88.5)	31.4 (88.5)	31.5 (88.7)	30.8 (87.4)
Daily mean °C (°F)	26.7 (80.1)	26.3 (79.3)	25.9 (78.6)	25.5 (77.9)	25.2 (77.4)	24.6 (76.3)	24.4 (75.9)	25.1 (77.2)	25.5 (77.9)	25.8 (78.4)	26.2 (79.2)	26.3 (79.3)	25.6 (78.1)
Mean daily minimum °C (°F)	22.7 (72.9)	22.7 (72.9)	22.7 (72.9)	22.8 (73.0)	22.6 (72.7)	22.1 (71.8)	21.7 (71.1)	21.9 (71.4)	22.3 (72.1)	22.5 (72.5)	22.7 (72.9)	22.7 (72.9)	22.4 (72.3)
Average precipitation mm (inches)	115.0 (4.53)	197.6 (7.78)	237.5 (9.35)	306.3 (12.06)	330.0 (12.99)	385.9 (15.19)	297.6 (11.72)	234.7 (9.24)	249.5 (9.82)	235.2 (9.26)	222.5 (8.76)	134.4 (5.29)	2,923.4 (115.09)
Average precipitation days	11	14	19	22	24	24	23	21	19	18	17	14	222
Average relative humidity (%)	80	83	86	88	88	88	88	86	85	85	84	83	85
Mean monthly sunshine hours	164.3	121.4	105.4	96.0	102.3	96.0	108.5	133.3	141.0	148.8	147.0	155.0	1,519
Mean daily sunshine hours	5.3	4.3	3.4	3.2	3.3	3.2	3.5	4.3	4.7	4.8	4.9	5.0	4.2
Source: Instituto de Hidrologia Meteorologia y Estudios Ambientales
