= Caucayá Airport =

Airport in the Putumayo Department of Colombia

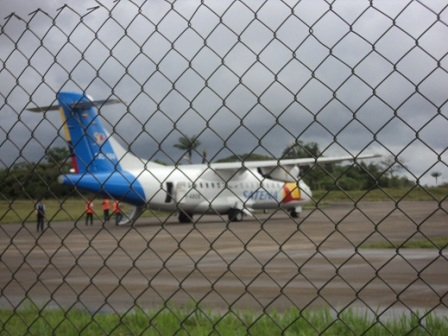
- IATA: LQM; ICAO: SKLG

Summary
- Airport type: Public
- Serves: Puerto Leguízamo, Colombia
- Elevation AMSL: 573 ft (175 m)
- Coordinates: 0°10′55″S 74°46′15″W

Map
- Location of the airport in Colombia

Runways
Direction	Length		Surface
Direction	m	ft	Surface
12/30	1,200	3,937	Asphalt
- Source: WAD GCM HERE Maps

Caucayá Airport (IATA: LQM, ICAO: SKLG) is an airport serving the river town of Puerto Leguízamo in the Putumayo Department of Colombia. Puerto Leguízamo is on the Putumayo River, locally the border with Peru. The runway is 1.5 kilometres (0.93 mi) northeast of the town.

== Airlines and destinations ==
Airlines	Destinations
SATENA	Puerto Asís

== Accidents ==
On 23 March 2026, a Lockheed C-130 Hercules operated by the Colombian Air Force crashed into a jungle shortly after take-off from the airport, killing 69 people and leaving 57 survivors.

== See also ==
- Transport in Colombia
- List of airports in Colombia
