= Northrop Grumman XRQ-73 SHEPARD =

Hybrid electric uncrewed aircraft

XRQ-73 SHEPARD
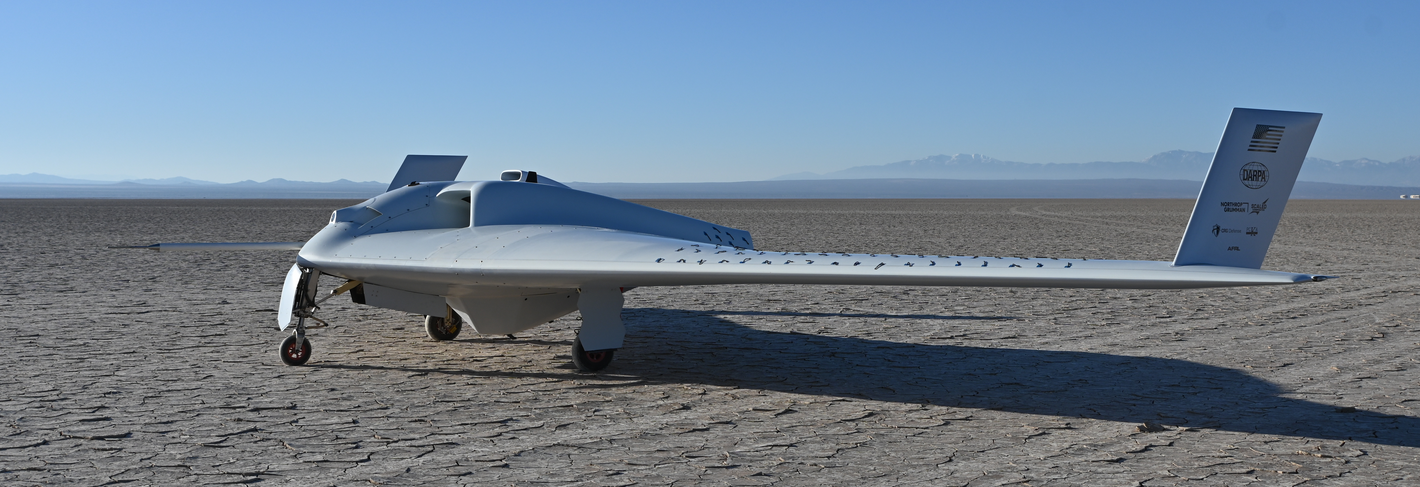

General information
- Type: Unmanned aerial vehicle/unmanned aircraft system
- Manufacturer: Northrop Grumman Aeronautics Systems

History
- First flight: 14 April 2026

The Northrop Grumman XRQ-73 SHEPARD (Series Hybrid Electric Propulsion AiRcraft Demonstration) is a tailless flying wing hybrid-electric Group 3 unmanned aerial vehicle (weighing about 1,250 lb (570 kg)) developed by Northrop Grumman.

The prime contractor will be Northrop Grumman's Aeronautic Systems, with Scaled Composites, Cornerstone Research Group, Brayton Energy, PC Krause and Associates, and EaglePicher Technologies as suppliers.

The XRQ-73 is an evolution of the XRQ-72A Great Horned Owl (GHO).

The first flight took place in April 2026, from Edwards Air Force Base; DARPA did not officially release the precise date, but reports were that it was on April 14.
