= 2026 Baramati Learjet 45 crash =

Aviation accident in India

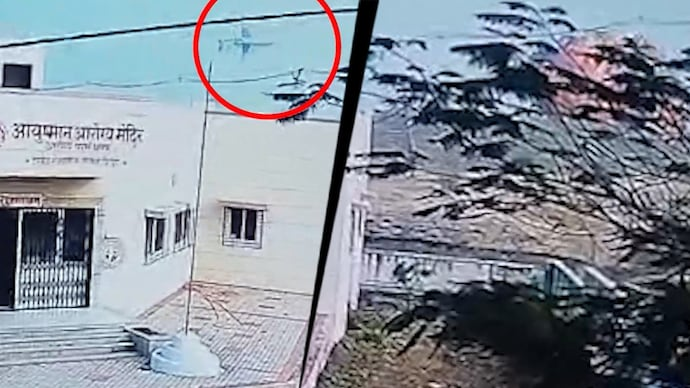
- A CCTV still of the aircraft seconds before crashing

Accident
- Date: 28 January 2026
- Summary: Loss of control, under investigation
- Site: Baramati Airport, Baramati, Pune district, Maharashtra, India

Aircraft
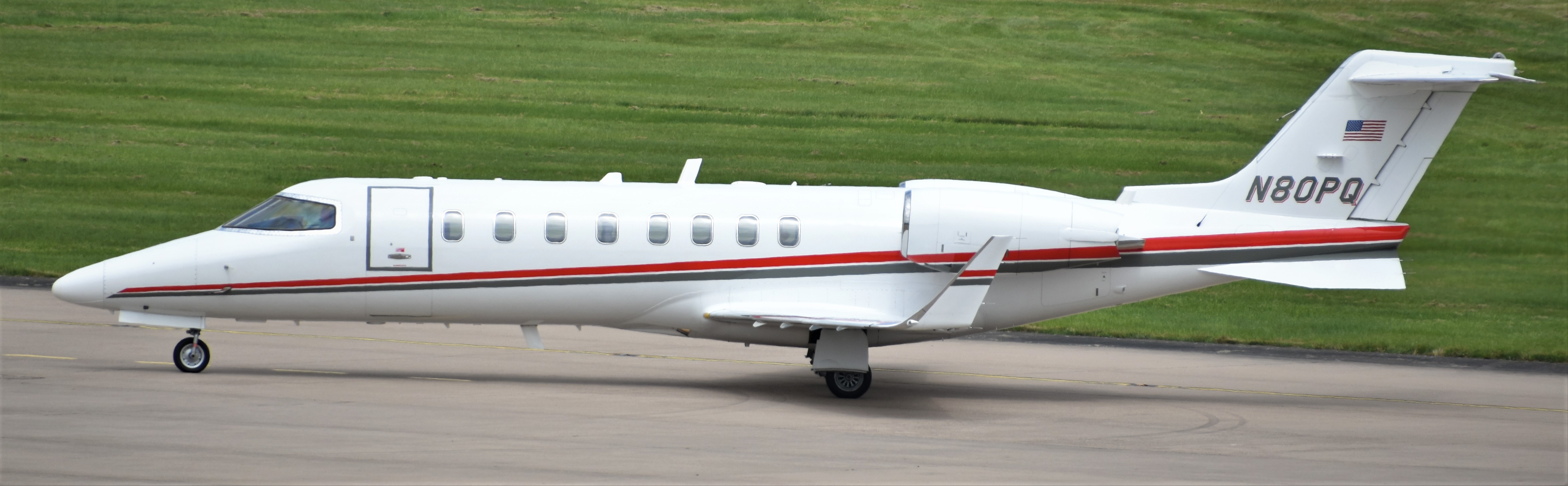
- The aircraft involved in the accident, while still in service with a previous operator in 2021
- Aircraft type: Learjet 45XR
- Operator: VSR Ventures
- Registration: VT-SSK
- Flight origin: Chhatrapati Shivaji Maharaj International Airport, Mumbai, India
- Destination: Baramati Airport, Baramati, India
- Occupants: 5
- Passengers: 2
- Crew: 3
- Fatalities: 5
- Survivors: 0

On 28 January 2026, a Learjet 45 operated by VSR Ventures crashed during a charter flight from Chhatrapati Shivaji Maharaj International Airport in Mumbai to Baramati Airport in Maharashtra, India, killing the Deputy Chief Minister of Maharashtra, Ajit Pawar, as well as all four other occupants. The crash was determined to be in low visibility and heavy fog.

== Background ==
=== Aircraft ===
The aircraft involved was a VT-SSK, a 16-year-old Learjet 45XR operated by VSR Ventures. VSR Aviation provides charter and medivac flights.

=== Passengers and crew ===
There were five people on board the flight. The pilot was Sumit Kapur, who had logged 16,500 flight hours. The co-pilot was identified as Shambhavi Pathak. The flight attendant was identified as Pinky Mali. The passengers were identified as Ajit Pawar, the deputy chief minister of Maharashtra, and his personal security officer, Vidip Jadhav. Kapur was not intended to be present, and filled in for a friend who had been stuck in traffic.

== Accident ==
At approximately 08:46 IST (UTC+5:30), the aircraft crashed into an open field while attempting a second approach to runway 11 at Baramati Airport. The aircraft veered off the runway, burst into flames, and was destroyed on impact, resulting in the deaths of Pawar and four others on board. The pilot issued a warning minutes before the crash. CCTV footage showed the aircraft flipping, losing control, crashing and exploding. At the time of the incident, Ajit Pawar was travelling to Baramati to address multiple public meetings in connection with the upcoming Zilla Parishad elections.

== Aftermath ==
Devendra Fadnavis, the chief minister of Maharashtra, announced three days of state mourning. He went on to describe the incident as "an immeasurable loss". The loss was announced by half flaring of flag of India for the next three days after the accident.

Indian Prime Minister Narendra Modi posted on X (formerly, Twitter) that he was saddened by news of the crash and also paid tribute to Pawar.

Tributes came in from across the political spectrum including from Devendra Fadnavis, Narendra Modi, Rahul Gandhi, Amit Shah and Sanjay Raut. Thousands of his followers and supporters filled the streets of Baramati for his funeral, where he was cremated with full state honours. Among the attendees was Shah.

VK Singh, the owner of VSR Ventures, claimed technical failure was unlikely and low visibility was the primary factor behind the incident.

== Investigation ==
The Aircraft Accident Investigation Bureau arrived at the scene and is investigating the cause. The flight recorder was recovered from the crash site. Local media cited poor visibility as a potential cause for the crash.

On 25 February 2026, the Directorate General of Civil Aviation (DGCA) noted concerns about airworthiness oversight, flight operations, and flight management systems and grounded four Learjet aircraft of the operator VSR Ventures.

== See Also ==
- 2026 Uttarakhand helicopter crash
- 2025 Uttarakhand helicopter crash
