= Air Charter Services Pvt. Ltd. =

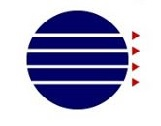
Logo (ACSPL)

Air Charter Services Pvt. Ltd. also known as ACSPL is an Indian company which provides air-charter service across the country. India has around 120 air charter companies, on year 2014 DGCA tried to force the companies to cancel their NSOP (Non-Schedule Operators Permit) due to the reason that most of the companies have less than three aircraft and would be treated as, 'private'. ACSPL has not been affected due to their fleet range of more than three aircraft and continue to run under current NSOP. The company is based in New Delhi, the capital city of the Republic of India. The company has been awarded the maiden BizAvIndia Awards on the sidelines of Aero India 2015 by the 'Business Aircraft Operators Association'(BAOA). The company has been listed as non-schedule operator with Directorate General of Civil Aviation, the body which functions under Ministry of Civil Aviation, Government of India. ACSPL suffered a loss of one of its aircraft crashed due to bad weather on year 2011, It was flying back to New-Delhi from Patna. ACSPL is also appointed as 'Pilatus' Authorized Sales and Service Centre for India.
