= Aeroflot accidents and incidents in the 1940s =

Following is a list of accidents and incidents Aeroflot experienced in the 1940s. The deadliest event the Soviet Union's flag carrier went through in the decade occurred in November 1941, when a Lisunov PS-84 crashed in Lake Ladoga following an attack by a German fighter. Another 36 died when a Tupolev PS-124 crashed in the Kazakh SSR after a passenger took control.

The number of recorded fatalities aboard Aeroflot aircraft during the decade rose to 1143; likewise, 225 of its aircraft were written off in accidents or incidents, split into one Lockheed Model 14 Super Electra, 29 Douglas C-47s, five Douglas DC-3s, five Tupolev G-2s, 14 Ilyushin Il-12s, eight Junkers Ju 52s, 158 Lisunov PS-84/Li-2s, one PBN-1 Nomad, one Tupolev PS-40, one PS-124 and two Douglas TS-62s. Most of the fatal accidents took place within the borders of the Soviet Union. Most aircraft losses during this decade were during World War II.

Certain Western media accounts have speculated that the Soviet government was reluctant publicly to admit the occurrence of such events. The true number of accidents, they suggest, might have been higher, as fatal events would have only been admitted when there were foreigners aboard the crashed aircraft, the accident took place in a foreign country, or they reached the news for some reason. However, since the dissolution of the USSR, no evidence of significant numbers of unreported serious accidents has emerged, in any of its then-constituent republics.

== List ==
Date	Location	Aircraft	Tail number	Airline division	Aircraft damage	Fatalities	Description	Refs
26 April 1940	(Soviet Union) Sinegubovo	PS-41	CCCP-Л3529	Aeroflot KVLP	W/O	3/3	The aircraft was operating a Moscow-Kharkiv-Mineralnye Vody cargo service. While flying at 300 m (980 ft) at a speed of 290 km/h (180 mph), weather conditions worsened with low clouds and rain. With no radio contact to obtain a weather briefing, the crew flew south and passed over Tula. Shortly after, the crew flew into fog and were unable to locate their position and they decided to return. Flying too low in fog at 220 km/h (140 mph), the aircraft struck trees and crashed in a ravine.	
16 May 1940	(Soviet Union) Voronezh	PS-41	CCCP-Т3518	Moscow	W/O	3/3	The aircraft was operating a Stalingrad (now Volgograd)-Moscow mail flight. After takeoff, the aircraft entered clouds and continued northwest. After flying some 350 km (220 mi) at 4,000 m (13,000 ft) in clouds, the aircraft entered a high-speed (750–800 km/h (470–500 mph)) uncontrolled descent and crashed in a field. Due to the destruction of the aircraft, the cause was not determined, but icing was blamed.	
9 June 1940	(Soviet Union) Novoe Selo	PS-41	CCCP-Л3523	Georgia	W/O	2/2	The aircraft was operating a Rostov-on-Don–Sochi–Sukhumi–Kutaisi–Tbilisi mail flight. Fifty minutes into the flight, while flying through storms, control was lost and the aircraft entered a high-speed (600–700 km/h (370–430 mph)) dive, partially broke up in the air and crashed in a field. The aircraft was probably struck by lightning.	
16 June 1940	(Soviet Union) Chernyshkovsky	AP	CCCP-А1289	Moscow	W/O	1/2	The aircraft was spraying mustard plants. After his lunch break, the pilot made some low passes over the village and to show off the aircraft's capabilities. At 10–12 m (33–39 ft) he performed stunts, but then lost control and the aircraft crashed. The pilot was drunk.	
30 June 1940	(Soviet Union) Ust-Kut	PS-7	CCCP-Л2154	East Siberia	W/O	1/5	The aircraft was operating an Irkutsk–Balagansk–Ust-Kut–Yakutsk passenger service. Approaching Ust-Kut an engine lost power and began to vibrate. The pilot attempted an emergency landing, but the aircraft clipped trees and crashed in a wooded area. The next day, the surviving four occupants walked through the taiga and found rescue.	
7 August 1940	(Soviet Union) Novosibirsk	PS-84	CCCP-Л3409	Moscow-Irkutsk	W/O	18/21	Crashed in bad weather. The aircraft was operating a Moscow–Omsk–Novosibirsk–Irkutsk passenger service.	
23 November 1940	(Soviet Union) Ordzhonikidze Krai	PS-84	CCCP-Л3405	Georgia	W/O	4	Struck a mountain in bad weather. The aircraft was operating a Rostov-on-Don–Mineralnye Vody passenger service.	
6 January 1941	(Soviet Union) Leshukonskoye	PR-5	CCCP-Л2569	33rd Sep. Det.	W/O	0/5	Crashed on approach. The aircraft was operating a Ust-Tsylma–Leshukonskoye passenger service.	
10 January 1941	(Soviet Union) Ukhta	PR-5	CCCP-Л3370	33rd Sep. Det.	W/O	0/5	Crashed and broke in two. The aircraft was operating a flight from Ust-Tsylma to Ukhta to collect election materials.	
15 January 1941	(Soviet Union) Danghara	G-1	CCCP-Л1991	Tajikistan	W/O	0/3	Crashed.	
16 January 1941	(Soviet Union) Suslovo	PR-5	CCCP-F	East Siberia	W/O	0/1	The aircraft was on a delivery flight from Omsk to Ulan-Ude. En route the engine failed and the pilot attempted an emergency landing, but the aircraft crashed in a prairie.	
6 February 1941	(Soviet Union) Trostyanka	PS-41	CCCP-Л3530	Moscow	W/O	0/3	During the second leg of a Moscow-Kuybyshev (now Samara)-Almaty mail flight, the aircraft suffered technical problems and attempted an emergency landing, but the aircraft crashed in a pasture 70 km (43 mi) east of Kuybyshev.	
6 February 1941	(Soviet Union) Kuybyshev	PS-41	CCCP-Л3522	Moscow	W/O	0/3	En route to Kuybyshev (now Samara) the aircraft encountered icing conditions and the cockpit windows iced over. The pilot was forced to put his head out to land at Kuybyshev Airport, but the aircraft missed the runway in the process. The aircraft skidded off the runway after landing. Due to complete the first leg of a Moscow-Kuybyshev-Almaty mail flight.	
11 February 1941	(Soviet Union) Samarovo	PR-5	CCCP-Л3374	Ob	W/O	7/7	The aircraft was operating a Tyumen-Samarovo (now Khanty-Mansiysk) passenger service. Approaching Samarovo weather worsened with snow reducing visibility. The pilot flew over Samarovo without visual contact and continued until weather improved, after which the pilot decided to return, despite bad weather. Coming from the north, the pilot attempted to land in a pasture, but lost control and the aircraft crashed. This crash is the deadliest involving the PR-5.	
13 February 1941	(Soviet Union) Oktyabrskaya	PS-41bis	CCCP-Л3505	Northern	W/O	1/2	Before takeoff for a Leningrad (now Volgograd)-Moscow mail flight, the pilot was informed of weather conditions and was told to stay below 600 m (2,000 ft). Shortly after takeoff the aircraft returned due to a leak in the right oil tank and after repairs the aircraft took off again. The pilot continued at 500–600 m (1,600–2,000 ft) until the aircraft entered clouds. Due to turbulence, the pilot climbed to 2,500 m (8,200 ft) and then 3,000 m (9,800 ft). Later while descending, speed increased from 270 km/h (170 mph) to 400 km/h (250 mph) and the aircraft became unstable. The flight engineer was tossed about and attempted to radio the pilot, but he could not and bailed out; he was later found alive. The aircraft continued to descend and the pilot also attempted to bail out, but it was too late. His parachute failed to open and he died in the fall.	
7 March 1941	(Soviet Union) Tula	ANT-9	CCCP-Л118	Azerbaijan	W/O	0/2	The aircraft was being ferried from Moscow to Baku. En route the crew encountered poor weather and diverted to Tula. After landing the aircraft veered off the runway, breaking off the left engine.	
8 March 1941	(Soviet Union) Petropavlovsk	PR-5	CCCP-Л3387	Novosibirsk	W/O	1/1	The aircraft was operating an Omsk-Petropavlovsk cargo flight. On approach, the aircraft descended too low to the right and the pilot began a left turn when control was lost. The aircraft crashed 950 m (3,120 ft) from the 'T'.	
14 March 1941	(Soviet Union) Begovat	G-2	CCCP-Л1496	Uzbekistan	W/O	6/6	While flying at 200–250 m (660–820 ft), the aircraft encountered severe turbulence. The aircraft lost altitude and the aircraft stalled and crashed while trying to climb back to its previous altitude. The aircraft was operating a Tashkent–Fergana cargo service.	
23 March 1941	(Soviet Union) Verkhnyaya Kolybelka	Stal-3	CCCP-Л1243	Moscow	W/O	2/6	Crashed. The aircraft was operating a Voronezh-Moscow passenger flight.	
1 April 1941	(Soviet Union) Shala Pristan	PR-5	CCCP-Л3311	Northern	W/O	1/1	The aircraft was operating a Petrozavodsk–Pudozh cargo flight. Before the flight, the pilot was told that if weather worsened, he was to fly around Lake Onega. Weather did indeed worsen en route and visibility was too low when the aircraft crashed in a snowy field some 9 km (5.6 mi) south of Shala Pristan. The wreckage was found the next day by another pilot flying the same route.	
7 April 1941	(Soviet Union) Khotmyzhsk	PS-35	CCCP-Л2482	Ukraine	W/O	0	The aircraft was operating a Moscow-Kharkiv flight. En route the crew encountered severe icing conditions and decided to make an emergency landing when the aircraft crashed in a field.	
12 April 1941	(Soviet Union) Khoe	R-5	CCCP-Л1679	Far East	W/O	3/3	The aircraft was operating a Aleksandrovsk-Sakhalinski–Khabarovsk passenger flight. Some 14 minutes into the flight, the pilot entered fog. Due to poor visibility, he descended fast when control was lost. The aircraft crashed on the icy Tatar Strait, some 3 km (1.9 mi) off Khoe. The pilot may have blacked out due to a medical condition; he had previously lost consciousness in 1940 at Okha Airport.	
25 April 1941	(Soviet Union) Moscow	DC-3-196A	URSS-C	Unknown	W/O	0/3	Crashed on takeoff in a snowstorm.	
18 May 1941	(Soviet Union) Mestia	R-5	CCCP-Л2988	Georgia	W/O	0/1	Crashed on landing due to pilot error. Due to complete a Kutaisi-Mestia mail flight.	
21 May 1941	(Soviet Union) Minsk	PS-7	CCCP-Т435	Belarus	W/O	1/1	The aircraft was on a training flight. After several circuits over Minsk Airport, the pilot began the approach. The aircraft was not aligned with the runway and the pilot performed a go-around. The aircraft continued for 300 m (980 ft) at 50 m (160 ft), then lost altitude, rolled left and crashed. The pilot had not positioned the stabilizers in the correct position for landing (negative instead of positive angle).	
27 May 1941	(Soviet Union) Kulob	ANT-9	CCCP-Л112	Tajikistan	W/O	13/13	Struck a mountain. The aircraft was operating a Kulob-Stalinabad (now Dushanbe) passenger service. Ten minutes after takeoff at 940 m (3,080 ft) above a mountainous area, an engine failed. The crew attempted to make an emergency landing, but there was no suitable terrain. Altitude was lost and the aircraft struck the side of a mountain 18 km (11 mi) northwest of Kulob. Destruction of the aircraft and the lack of witnesses made an exact cause impossible; the engine failure was probably caused by fuel system and/or carburetor defects. This accident is the deadliest involving the ANT-9.	
27 May 1941	(Soviet Union) Budenovka	AP	CCCP-А1083	Ukraine	W/O	1/1	The pilot was spraying beet crops. Shortly after takeoff from the last flight, at 20–25 m (66–82 ft), the pilot began a sharp right turn. the aircraft rolled to a 45° angle when the pilot reduced engine power and the aircraft stalled and crashed.	
14 June 1941	(Soviet Union) Gosh	R-5	CCCP-Л2986	Armenia	W/O	0/1	Struck the side of a mountain in poor weather. The aircraft was operating a mail flight.	
23 June 1941	Unknown	S-2	CCCP-К475	Special Western	W/O	1/1	Missing.	
23 June 1941	Unknown	S-2	CCCP-К467	Special Western	W/O	1/1	Missing.	
24 June 1941	Unknown	SP	CCCP-Л2734	Special Western	W/O	1/1	Missing.	
24 June 1941	(Soviet Union) Churan	PS-7	CCCP-Л1478	Yakut	W/O	7/11	The aircraft was operating a Churan-Irkutsk passenger service. Shortly after takeoff, the aircraft entered a nose-high attitude, pitched up, stalled and crashed in the Lena River. All four crew escaped, but the passengers did not and drowned when the aircraft sank. The pilot had failed to position the stabilizers before takeoff.	
29 June 1941	(Soviet Union) Vayenga	PS-84	CCCP-Л3433	MAGON	W/O	0	While on approach to Vayenga during a supply flight (ammunition), the aircraft was accidentally attacked by Soviet Navy fighters. A forced landing was performed and the aircraft burned out.	
2 July 1941	Unknown	PS-84	CCCP-Л3467	MAGON	W/O	3/4	Disappeared after taking off from Vnukovo Airport for a mission; the aircraft probably crashed near Lipetsk. The pilot was located in a Tashkent hospital on 10 January 1942 with burns and injuries, but remembered nothing of the crash and the crew.	
6 July 1941	(Soviet Union) Bryansk	R-5	CCCP-Ф165	MAGON	W/O	0	Crashed on landing. Due to complete a mail flight.	
6 July 1941	(Soviet Union) Vnukovo Airport	G-2	CCCP-Л1493	MAGON	W/O	0	After landing, the aircraft was taxiing with two engines shut down. At a high speed, the pilot realized that the aircraft could not taxi further and throttled down and began turning right when the right landing gear collapsed. The landing gear could not withstand the load placed on it during the turn.	
7 July 1941	(Soviet Union) Rogachov	PS-84	CCCP-Л3470	MAGON	W/O	0	While on approach to Rogachov (then in German hands), the aircraft was accidentally shot down by a Soviet fighter, after which it crashed and burned out.	
8 July 1941	(Soviet Union) Luga	PS-84	CCCP-Л3466	MAGON	W/O	0	Crashed near Luga (then in German hands).	
11 July 1941	(Soviet Union) Gomel	R-5	Unknown	MAGON	W/O	1/1	Shot down by a German fighter.	
12 July 1941	(Soviet Union) Dmytrivka	PS-41	CCCP-Л3502	MAGON	W/O	0/2	On 29 June, during a flight from Moscow to Ternopil, the aircraft was struck by ground fire and landed at Proskurov. The same day the aircraft took off for Kiev but the aircraft was again attacked while approaching Kiev and the pilot decided to land in a rye field near Dmytrivka. Following repairs on site the crew attempted to take off but the aircraft failed to lift off and crashed in a swamp.	
12 July 1941	(Soviet Union) Smolensk	SP	CCCP-Л2267	Special Western	W/O	1/1	Crashed during a Smolensk-Nevel flight.	
13 July 1941	(Soviet Union) Ruza	PS-84	CCCP-Л3464	MAGON	W/O	0/22	The aircraft was flying 19 wounded soldiers from Velikiye Luki to Moscow when it was attacked three times by a German fighter and caught fire. The crew reduced altitude and force-landed in an open field near Ruza. All on board were able to escape before the aircraft burned out.	
13 July 1941	(Soviet Union) Velikiye Luki Airport	PS-84	CCCP-Л3939	MAGON	W/O	4/4	While on a supply flight (ammunition) from Moscow to Velikiye Luki the aircraft was attacked and shot down by four German fighters.	
14 July 1941	(Soviet Union) Smolensk	S-3	CCCP-А1291	Special Western	W/O	1/1	Disappeared during a Smolensk-Unetsha flight.	
14 July 1941	(Soviet Union) Orsha	U-2	CCCP-С5006	Special Western	W/O	2/2	Disappeared during a Orsha-Zubovo charter flight. Possibly shot down.	
15 July 1941	(Soviet Union) Ryabtsevo	G-2	CCCP-Л3055	MAGON	W/O	0/6	Inbound from Belarus on a cargo flight to Smolensk, the aircraft was accidentally struck by Soviet flak. The fearful pilot reduced altitude and attempted a forced landing, but the aircraft crashed in rough terrain.	
16 July 1941	(Soviet Union) Kalinin	R-5	CCCP-Ф95	MAGON	W/O	0/1	While flying low, the pilot lost control and the aircraft crashed.	
16 July 1941	(Soviet Union) Chkalovsky Airport	PS-84	CCCP-Л3460	MAGON	W/O	0/4	Crashed on takeoff. The engines had not been warmed up before takeoff.	
17 July 1941	(Soviet Union) Smolensk	SP	CCCP-Л2698	Special Western	W/O	1/1	Disappeared during a Vyazma-Smolensk flight. Possibly shot down.	
17 July 1941	(Soviet Union) Roslavl	S-3	CCCP-А864	Special Western	W/O	1/1	Disappeared during a Vyazma-Roslavl flight. Possibly shot down.	
18 July 1941	(Soviet Union) Kiev	R-5	CCCP-Ф49	MAGON	W/O	0/1	While flying low, control was lost and the aircraft crashed on the west side of Kiev. The aircraft had been accidentally attacked.	
19 July 1941	Unknown	PS-41bis	CCCP-Л3504	Special Northern	W/O	3/3	Disappeared while returning from a supply mission; the aircraft was probably shot down over the North Front region. All crew declared MIA and presumed dead.	
19 July 1941	Unknown	G-1	CCCP-Л2979	Special Northern	W/O	0/2	Crashed following right engine failure.	
19 July 1941	(Soviet Union) Yelnya	PS-84	CCCP-Л3427	MAGON	W/O	3/5	Disappeared while flying to Gomel from Vnukovo Airport for a mission. According to German archives, the pilot and radio operator were captured on 19 July 1941 near Yelnya. The radio operator died in captivity on 5 June 1942 while the pilot was returned in 1945.	
19 July 1941	(Soviet Union) Novgorod	DC-3-260	URSS-K	Moscow	W/O	0	Destroyed in a German air raid.	
19 July 1941	(Soviet Union) Spirovo	G-2	CCCP-Л2529	MAGON	W/O	7/7	The aircraft was operating a Moscow-Novgorod cargo service. While flying along the railway road to Kalinin (now Tver), the aircraft was shot down by a German fighter.	
20 July 1941	(Soviet Union) Novgorod	DC-3-260	URSS-G	Moscow	W/O	0	The aircraft was being flown to Novgorod to replace DC-3 URSS-K when it was destroyed by enemy action.	
21 July 1941	(Soviet Union) Kardymovo	S-2	CCCP-К474	Special Western	W/O	1/1	Disappeared while returning from the Kardymovo region. Possibly shot down.	
22 July 1941	(Soviet Union) Vnukovo Airport	G-2	CCCP-Л3056	MAGON	W/O	1/5	After takeoff, at 20–30 m (66–98 ft), the left engine lost power for reasons unknown. The aircraft rolled to the left, lost altitude, struck a tree and crashed. The engine was probably not warmed up before takeoff.	
25 July 1941	(Soviet Union) Nikolayev	PS-84	CCCP-Л3469	MAGON	W/O	10/10	Accidentally shot down by Soviet Air Force fighters.	
26 July 1941	(Soviet Union) Lake Sabro	PS-84	CCCP-Л3400 (Note: The aircraft was originally registered as URSS-М138.)	MAGON	W/O	0/24	The aircraft was flying from Kholm to Kalinin (now Tver) with wounded soldiers on board. Flying too low over Lake Sabro, the propellers struck the water. The aircraft then struck a tree on an island in the lake and crashed on the island.	
27 July 1941	(Soviet Union) Vyazma	PS-84	CCCP-Л3421	MAGON	W/O	1/4	The aircraft was on a positioning flight between two airfields at Vyazma when it was attacked by Luftwaffe aircraft, starting a fire. A forced landing was carried out.	
30 July 1941	(Soviet Union) Vyazma Airport	PS-84	CCCP-Л3459	MAGON	W/O	0	Landed outside the airfield and overran into a ravine after the crew failed to locate the runway.	
2 August 1941	Unknown	PS-41bis	CCCP-Л3509	Georgia	W/O	0/3	Crashed on takeoff. Due to begin a special night mission.	
2 August 1941	(Soviet Union) Kiev Airport	DC-3-196A	URSS-B	MAGON	W/O	0/0	Caught fire and burned out during an enemy air raid.	
2 August 1941	(Soviet Union) Uman	PS-84	CCCP-Л3431	MAGON	W/O	4	The aircraft were part of a group of five PS-84s delivering ammo, weapons and fuel to encircled Red Army units near Teklievka (near Uman, Ukraine). Near Kirovograd (now Kirovohrad) both aircraft came under fire from German flak. CCCP-Л3429 crashed and burned, all on board died. CCCP-Л3431 was also hit but was able to make an emergency landing behind enemy lines. The crew of this aircraft were captured by the Germans.	
2 August 1941	(Soviet Union) Uman	Li-2	CCCP-Л3429	MAGON	W/O	4	The aircraft were part of a group of five PS-84s delivering ammo, weapons and fuel to encircled Red Army units near Teklievka (near Uman, Ukraine). Near Kirovograd (now Kirovohrad) both aircraft came under fire from German flak. CCCP-Л3429 crashed and burned, all on board died. CCCP-Л3431 was also hit but was able to make an emergency landing behind enemy lines. The crew of this aircraft were captured by the Germans.	
3 August 1941	(Soviet Union) Mosaly	S-3	CCCP-А770	Special Western	W/O	1/1	Shot down by enemy fire.	
6 August 1941	(Soviet Union) Vnukovo Airport	PS-84	CCCP-Л3432	MAGON	W/O	0	In the early morning the two aircraft left Pakhomovo on a positioning flight to Moscow. Neither the crew nor Pakhomovo ATC knew about the weather at Moscow. CCCP-Л3480 encountered fog, performed a go-around and began circling. CCCP-Л3432 was attempting to land when it collided with CCCP-Л3480 that was landing in the opposite direction. Both aircraft crashed; CCCP-Л3480 was repaired and returned to service while CCCP-Л3432 was written off. There were no casualties on either aircraft.	
6 August 1941	(Soviet Union) Vnukovo Airport	PS-84	CCCP-Л3480	MAGON	Repaired	0	In the early morning the two aircraft left Pakhomovo on a positioning flight to Moscow. Neither the crew nor Pakhomovo ATC knew about the weather at Moscow. CCCP-Л3480 encountered fog, performed a go-around and began circling. CCCP-Л3432 was attempting to land when it collided with CCCP-Л3480 that was landing in the opposite direction. Both aircraft crashed; CCCP-Л3480 was repaired and returned to service while CCCP-Л3432 was written off. There were no casualties on either aircraft.	
8 August 1941	(Soviet Union) Bereznegovatoye	PS-84	CCCP-Л3919	MAGON	W/O	0/3	During a cargo flight in the Nikolaev region, the aircraft flew low near the front line where Soviet troops were retreating and was attacked by an unknown aircraft. The pilot descended almost to ground level, but the right propeller hit the ground and the aircraft crashed.	
8 August 1941	(Soviet Union) Rostov-on-Don	PS-41	CCCP-Л3515	Azov-Black Sea	W/O	1/3	The aircraft was operating a meteorological (atmospheric sounding) flight. While at 5,000 m (16,000 ft), the right engine developed problems. On the mechanic's advice, the pilot shut down the engine and decided to return to Rostov. On final approach on one engine, speed dropped and the aircraft stalled and crashed short of the runway.	
10 August 1941	(Soviet Union) Veimarn	PS-84	CCCP-Л3426	Northern	W/O	0/4	Shot down by an enemy aircraft and made a wheels-up emergency landing on rough terrain.	
13 August 1941	(Soviet Union) Podmoshye	SP	CCCP-С1181	Special Western	W/O	1/2	Shot down by enemy fire.	
18 August 1941	(Soviet Union) Sofiysk	PS-7	CCCP-Л2962	Far East	W/O	3/7	The aircraft was operating a Khabarovsk–Nizhnetambovskoye–Aleksandrovsk-Sakhalinski passenger service. About an hour into the second leg, the pilot noticed a leak on the right engine, between cylinders seven and eight. The engine quit shortly after and the crew decided to make an emergency landing on the Amur River. The water was glassy (smooth and reflective) and on landing some 700 m (2,300 ft) offshore, the aircraft crashed, overturned and sank.	
18 August 1941	(Soviet Union) Sevan	S-2	CCCP-К398	Armenia	W/O	1/1	After dropping off an engineer at Sevan, the pilot took off to return to Yerevan. Shortly after lifting off, at 25–35 m (82–115 ft) the aircraft entered a sharp left turn then nosed down and crashed. The pilot died of his injuries four hours later.	
19 August 1941	(Soviet Union) Yastrebovo	PS-84	CCCP-Л3483	MAGON	W/O	3/4	Attacked by a German fighter, caught fire, and crashed in a forest. The aircraft was operating a Moscow-Vyazma supply flight.	
21 August 1941	(Soviet Union) Mirgorod Airport	DC-3-196A	URSS-H	MAGON	Repaired	0/24	En route from Brovary at night, the aircraft approached the unlit Mirgorod Airport (which had not been informed of the flight). The crew did not realize the presence of radio masts on the approach path and attempted to avoid them, but in the process, the aircraft lost speed and stalled at 15 m (49 ft) and crashed. The aircraft was repaired and returned to service.	
24 August 1941	(Soviet Union) Sadovniki	PS-7	CCCP-Л3764	Tajikistan	W/O	0/2	The aircraft was being ferried from Myachkovo Airport to Vnukovo Airport. Some 15 minutes into the flight, weather worsened and the pilot became disorientated due to the limited visibility in rain. He descended and attempted an emergency landing in a muddy field near Sadovniki. On touchdown the landing gear broke off.	
26 August 1941	(Soviet Union) Shapki	SP	CCCP-К281	Special Northern	W/O	1/3	The aircraft was operating a medevac flight, carrying two wounded soldiers. En route the aircraft was shot down by enemy fire.	
27 August 1941	(Soviet Union) Kizyl-Arvat	G-2	CCCP-Л1996	Uzbekistan	W/O	6/9	The crew was informed that their destination airport was lit when actually it was not, due to a blackout. The crew failed to locate the airport and flew northwest. Later a forced landing was attempted at Kizyl-Arvat, but the aircraft struck a hill at 70 m (230 ft) and crashed. The aircraft was operating a Tashkent-Ashkhabad cargo service in support of the Central Asian Military Division.	
26 August 1941	(Soviet Union) Mga	PS-84	CCCP-Л3410	MAGON	W/O	0/7	The aircraft was on a special flight carrying secret documents when it was shot down by a German fighter, after which it crashed in a wooded area and burned out.	
29 August 1941	(Soviet Union) Nevskaya Dubrovka	PS-84	CCCP-Л3412	MAGON	W/O	0/9	The aircraft was operating a Moscow-Leningrad (now Volgograd) charter flight. Approaching Leningrad the aircraft was accidentally hit by Soviet flak and the crew decided to make a forced landing, but the aircraft crashed 2.5 km (1.6 mi) further on.	
30 August 1941	Unknown	MP-1bis	CCCP-Л2551	Special Northern	W/O	0/8	During a paratrooping mission, the aircraft landed on a lake behind enemy lines, but the hull was punctured and the aircraft sank.	
6 September 1941	(Soviet Union) Leningrad	PS-84	CCCP-Л3923	MAGON	W/O	0/5	The aircraft was on a flight from Komendantskiy Airfield to an area near Divenskaya railway station (Gatchinsky District, Leningrad region) behind German lines when it was struck by ground fire. A forced landing was performed after which the aircraft burned out.	
6 September 1941	(Soviet Union) Bryukhovetskaya	R-5	CCCP-Ф89	MAGON	W/O	4	The aircraft was operating a Simferopol-Moscow. En route, the pilot descended too low and the landing gear hit the ground. The aircraft then struck and killed two people working in a field, after which the aircraft crashed.	
10 September 1941	(Soviet Union) Yedrovo	PS-84	CCCP-Л3908	MAGON	W/O	0/0	Destroyed on the ground during a German air raid.	
13 September 1941	(Soviet Union) Olenitsa	PR-5	CCCP-Л2518	Special Northern	W/O	1/5	The aircraft was flying four wounded soldiers from Murmansk to Arkhangelsk. Two hours into the flight, the engine began losing power and ultimately failed. The pilot attempted an emergency landing but the aircraft crashed upside down in a bog. The aircraft later burned out following an accidental fire set by the passengers who were smoking around the wreckage. The cause of the engine failure was never determined.	
17 September 1941	(Soviet Union) Volosta-Pyatnitsa	S-2	CCCP-К406	Special Western	W/O	1/1	Shot down by enemy fire.	
28 September 1941	(Soviet Union) Pilno	PS-41	CCCP-Л3542	Georgia	W/O	0/2	The crew was returning following a mail flight. In poor visibility, the crew was unable to locate the airport. After flying for four hours, the crew bailed out of the aircraft that then crashed past enemy lines.	
3 October 1941	(Soviet Union) Vyazma-Dvoyevka	PS-84	CCCP-Л3926	MAGON	W/O	1/7	Crashed on takeoff. The crew attempted to take off at night from a 700 m (2,300 ft) runway; the aircraft was also overloaded by 1,114 kg (2,456 lb). After lifting off the runway the aircraft lost height and crashed after 100–150 m (330–490 ft), one passenger died. The wreckage was destroyed to prevent it from falling into German hands.	
4 October 1941	(Soviet Union) Vnukovo Airport	PS-84	CCCP-Л3928	MAGON	W/O	0/5	Shortly after takeoff, the right engine failed. The pilot told the mechanic to raise the landing gear, but for unknown reasons he never did so. The aircraft began to lose altitude and struck trees and crashed. The engine failure was caused by poor maintenance.	
4 October 1941	(Soviet Union) Vorochilovsk	AP	CCCP-А1194	Kiev	W/O	1/2	The aircraft was on a Pyatigorsk–Vorochilovsk (now Stavropol)–Krasnodar delivery flight. Before takeoff for the second leg, the crew assumed the weather conditions were good, but a few minutes after takeoff, weather worsened and visibility was too low. Despite this, the pilot continued flying in clouds until he lost control and the aircraft crashed.	
7 October 1941	(Soviet Union) Kasnya	SP	CCCP-Л2591	Special Western	W/O	1/1	Shot down by enemy fire.	
8 October 1941	Unknown	PS-84	CCCP-Л3937	Special Northern	W/O	0	The aircraft took off from Bolshoi Dvor on a special flight on behalf of the Soviet Army. En route the crew encountered poor visibility due to snow. The crew attempted an emergency landing, but the aircraft struck a telegraph pole, breaking off the left wing and crashed in a ditch.	
9 October 1941	(Soviet Union) Moscow	PS-84	CCCP-Л3420	MAGON	W/O	0/3	Crashed on takeoff during a test flight. The flight engineer had selected a near-empty fuel tank, causing both engines to quit.	
9 October 1941	(Soviet Union) Kozelsk	PS-84	CCCP-Л3917	MAGON	W/O	0/17	After a forced landing following an attack by German fighters, the aircraft took off again but crashed due to icing.	
9 October 1941	(Soviet Union) Tikhvin	PS-84	CCCP-Л3462	MAGON	W/O	0/4	Crashed on takeoff due to overloading.	
10 October 1941	(Soviet Union) Sevsk	PS-84	CCCP-Л3491	MAGON	W/O	1/6	While on approach to Soviet units encircled by Germans in the Bryansk area, the aircraft was hit by German fire, after which it force-landed near Sevsk and burned out.	
10 October 1941	(Soviet Union) Sankt Navlya	DC-3-260	URSS-D	MAGON	W/O	3/5	En route from Monino to the Bryansk area, the aircraft was struck by German ground fire and exploded in mid-air, breaking in two. Three of the five on board were thrown out of the aircraft by the blast; two of them (including the pilot) were taken prisoner by the Germans.	
10 October 1941	(Soviet Union) Kasnya	SP	CCCP-Л1296	Special Western	W/O	1/1	Shot down by enemy fire during a Vyazma-Kasnya flight.	
12 October 1941	(Soviet Union) Medyn	PS-84	CCCP-Л3978	MAGON	W/O	0/6	Attacked and hit by German fighters. The aircraft crashed and burned out.	
12 October 1941	(Soviet Union) Dmitrovsk	PS-84	CCCP-Л3970	MAGON	W/O	0/6	While flying to an area in the Kursk region that was in German hands, the aircraft was shot down by German forces.	
12 October 1941	(Soviet Union) Sevsk	PS-84	CCCP-Л3496	MAGON	W/O	2/6	Struck by enemy fire (possibly ground fire) and crashed and burned out.	
12 October 1941	(Soviet Union) Kursk area	PS-84	CCCP-Л3494	MAGON	W/O	0/6	Struck by enemy fire and crashed and burned out.	
12 October 1941	(Soviet Union) Gorlovo	PS-84	CCCP-Л3936	MAGON	W/O	6/6	Crashed following an attack by a German Me 109.	
12 October 1941	(Soviet Union) Mozhaysk	PS-84	CCCP-Л3925	MAGON	W/O	3/7	Crashed and burned out following an attack by twelve German Me 109s.	
13 October 1941	(Soviet Union) Ladoga	PS-84	CCCP-Л3957	MAGON	W/O	0/4	Shot down by enemy fire.	
13 October 1941	(Soviet Union) Chornoye	PS-84	CCCP-Л3419	MAGON	W/O	2/7	During a flight from Leningrad to the Soviet hinterland, the aircraft was attacked by German forces.	
13 October 1941	(Soviet Union) Kursk area	PS-84	CCCP-Л3449	MAGON	W/O	0/6	During a cargo flight to drop supplies in the Kursk area, the aircraft was struck by German anti-aircraft fire, damaging the right engine and hydraulic system. A forced landing was carried out, after which the aircraft caught fire.	
21 October 1941	Unknown	AP	CCCP-А1022	Special Western	W/O	1/1	Disappeared during a reconnaissance mission.	
22 October 1941	(Soviet Union) Kazan	G-2	CCCP-Л1495	MAGON	W/O	0/4	On approach to Kazan, the crew encountered poor visibility due to fog. The pilot continued the approach and descended too low. The aircraft struck the ground short of the runway and crashed.	
22 October 1941	(Soviet Union) Chernokorova	PS-7	CCCP-Л3751	Ob	W/O	10/10	En route to Sverdlovsk (now Yekaterinburg) from Tyumen for a political party committee meeting, the left engine failed at 100 m (330 ft). Control was lost and the aircraft rolled left, entered a dive and crashed. The aircraft, which was overloaded, was flying too low.	
23 October 1941	(Soviet Union) Vaziani	ANT-9	CCCP-Л157	Georgia	W/O	2/9	The aircraft flew from Tbilisi to Vaziani to pick up seven skydivers. During the takeoff roll at Vaziani, the aircraft rolled left and the pilot aborted the takeoff. A second takeoff was aborted for the same reason. Assuming that the mudguard was rubbing on the left wheel, the position of the mudguard was modified and a third takeoff was performed. The aircraft lifted off, but it turned 90° to the left and touched back down on its left wheel. After rolling for 88 m (289 ft) the right wheel touched down as well. After a further 9 m (30 ft), the aircraft crashed. The right rudder control cable had failed due to improper maintenance.	
27 October 1941	(Soviet Union) Shibenets	PS-84	CCCP-Л3930	MAGON	W/O	0/9	Lost control and crashed shortly after takeoff. The aircraft had taken off with snow on its wings.	
27 October 1941	(Soviet Union) Podborovye	PS-84	CCCP-Л3472	MAGON	W/O	16/17	The aircraft was transferring 10 mechanics: two to Cherepovets to replace cylinders on the aircraft there and the rest to Tikhvin to repair two aircraft. No information on the fate of the aircraft was heard until 23 November, when one of the mechanics returned to Moscow. According to his account, the aircraft landed at Cherepovets, but the aircraft to be repaired was not there and the aircraft continued to Tikhvin. In the area of Podborovye the aircraft was attacked by a German Ju 88 and caught fire. The pilot attempted to reach the airfield but the aircraft crashed.	
30 October 1941	(Soviet Union) Tashkent	PS-41	CCCP-Л3528	Uzbekistan	W/O	2/2	The aircraft was on a training flight. Shortly after takeoff, the left engine failed. The crew attempted to return to make an emergency landing, but the aircraft stalled and crashed on a lab of a textile factory northwest of the airport. The crew did not realize that the fuel valve on the left engine was closed.	
9 November 1941	Unknown	SP	CCCP-А865	Special Western	W/O	2/2	Disappeared while returning to base. Both pilots were declared dead.	
10 November 1941	(Soviet Union) Nikol'skoye	Ya-6	CCCP-К153	Special Baltic	W/O	0/1	Shortly after takeoff, the pilot began turning when control was lost. The aircraft dove into the ground and crashed.	
11 November 1941	Unknown	Ya-6	CCCP-Л2131	Special Northern	W/O	0/1	Failed to take off and overran the runway. The aircraft had struck an obstacle during takeoff.	
14 November 1941	(Soviet Union) Akchernya	PS-84	CCCP-Л3488	MAGON	W/O	14/14	The aircraft drifted off course by 18 km (11 mi) and the crew could not locate their destination of Uryupinsk. The crew selected flaps in preparation for a forced landing near Akchernya, but the aircraft, which was being ferried from Voronezh, crashed immediately afterwards.	
14 November 1941	(Soviet Union) Komendantskiy Airfield	PS-84	CCCP-Л3951	MAGON	W/O	0	Destroyed by a bomb during a German air raid while parked at Komendantskiy Airfield, near Leningrad (now Saint Petersburg).	
15 November 1941	(Soviet Union) Salnitsy	PS-84	CCCP-Л3444	MAGON	W/O	17/17	The aircraft was beginning a special flight from Moscow to Khvoinaya. Just minutes after takeoff the aircraft was attacked by two Me 109s and caught fire. The pilot attempted an emergency landing, but he had been killed during the attack. Control was lost and the aircraft crashed.	
15 November 1941	(Soviet Union) Podborovye Airfield	PS-84	CCCP-Л3927	MAGON	W/O	0	While parked, the aircraft was struck by two bombs during a Luftwaffe air raid and burned out.	
17 November 1941	(Soviet Union) Novaya Ladoga	PS-84	CCCP-Л3985	MAGON	W/O	0/5	Crashed while attempting to land in bad weather.	
17 November 1941	(Soviet Union) Moscow	SP	CCCP-А1109	Special Western	W/O	2/2	The aircraft was being ferried from Tushino to Monino Airport when it struck a cable of a barrage balloon and crashed.	
18 November 1941	(Soviet Union) Voronezh	Ya-6	CCCP-Л2775	Kiev	W/O	2/2	Approaching Voronezh from Urazovo, the aircraft struck a cable of a barrage balloon and crashed in the Voronezh River.	
19 November 1941	(Soviet Union) Naro-Fominsk	AP	CCCP-А1002	Special Western	W/O	2/2	Disappeared while returning from a combat mission; the aircraft crashed in the Naro-Fominsk region.	
19 November 1941	(Soviet Union) Komendatskiy Airfield	PS-84	CCCP-Л3955	MAGON	W/O	5/5	The aircraft was flying from Podborovye to Leningrad with seven other PS-84s when it was attacked by German Bf 109 fighters and crashed near Komendatskiy Airfield.	
29 November 1941	(Soviet Union) Saratov Airport	PS-84	CCCP-Л3989	MAGON	W/O	1/4	Crashed on takeoff during a test flight. On 7 November 1941, the aircraft's tail and ailerons were damaged in a storm while the aircraft was parked at Saratov. The aircraft was repaired on site, but during takeoff, the aircraft banked right and crashed. During repairs, the aileron control cables were cross-wired by mistake.	
30 November 1941	(Soviet Union) Lake Ladoga	PS-84	CCCP-Л3987	MAGON	W/O	36/36	The aircraft was flying from Leningrad to the Soviet hinterland with at least six other PS-84s when it attacked by four German fighters while between Cape Maryin Nos and Kivgoda and crashed in Lake Ladoga. The crash is the joint-deadliest involving the Li-2/PS-84.	
30 November 1941	(Soviet Union) Kian	K-5	CCCP-Л589	Azov-Black Sea	W/O	1/5	The pilot was to operate a Mineralnye Vody to Zimovniki but this was cancelled due to poor weather. Without permission, the pilot took off for a flight to Armavir. Approaching Kian the pilot encountered thick fog. In limited visibility the pilot decided to return and began a left turn when the aircraft struck the ground and crashed.	
1 December 1941	(Soviet Union) Arsk	PR-5	CCCP-Л2561	MAGON	W/O	0/5	During the flight, weather worsened with poor visibility due to snow. Instead of returning, the pilot decided to continue. The aircraft later crashed in a field.	
5 December 1941	(Soviet Union) Serpukhov	SP	CCCP-А1262	Special Western	W/O	3/3	Shot down by four German fighters.	
6 December 1941	(Soviet Union) Saratov Airport	PS-84	CCCP-Л3973	MAGON	W/O	0/11	Crashed shortly after takeoff. The aircraft was operating a Kuibyshev (now Samara)-Baku passenger service with stops at Saratov and Astrakhan. Shortly after takeoff both engines quit after the flight engineer mishandled the fuel system and the aircraft crashed.	
9 December 1941	(Soviet Union) Khvoinaya Airport	PS-84	CCCP-Л3922	MAGON	W/O	5/6	Struck a treetop 7 km (4.3 mi) north of Khvoinaya Airport, crashed into a forest and burned out. The aircraft was operating a Khvoinaya–Leningrad cargo service (food supply).	
15 December 1941	(Soviet Union) Sok-Karmala	PS-40	CCCP-Л2483	Moscow-Irkutsk	W/O	1/2	The crew waited for the weather to improve. When this happened, they took off from Kuybyshev (now Samara) to Sverdlovsk (now Yekaterinburg). The aircraft was flying low at 50 m (160 ft) and encountered fog over Sok-Karmala. The aircraft struck trees, lost altitude and crashed.	
18 December 1941	(Soviet Union) Khodynka Field	14H Super Electra	CCCP-Л3453	Moscow	W/O	2/3	Stalled and crashed while making a left turn at a height of 90–100 m (300–330 ft) following engine failure during a test flight.	
21 December 1941	(Soviet Union) Khvoinaya	PS-84	CCCP-Л3958	MAGON	W/O	0/5	Five to six minutes after takeoff, the right engine failed. The aircraft, flying low, lost airspeed and crashed in a forest.	
26 December 1941	Unknown	PS-40	CCCP-Л2450	Spec. Air Comm. Group	W/O	2/2	Disappeared over western Russia, near German lines. Both pilots declared MIA and presumed dead.	
26 December 1941	(Soviet Union) Zhigalovo	Po-2S	CCCP-К320	East Siberia	W/O	3/3	Disappeared during a flight from Irkutsk to transfer a patient to Nizhne-Illimsk. The crew stayed overnight in Balagansk, leaving the next day for Zhigalovo, but the aircraft never arrived there. The pilot probably entered fog on approach to Zhigalovo, overflew the airport and deviated by about 150 km (93 mi) in the area of the Kirenga River. Eventually the aircraft crashed, probably due to fuel exhaustion. The wreckage has never been found.	
26 December 1941	(Soviet Union) Dmitriyevka	G-2	CCCP-Л3043	Kazakhstan	W/O	26/34	After takeoff from Alma–Ata (now Almaty) the aircraft encountered low clouds and fog with turbulence. The pilot returned to Alma-Ata due to severe icing, but the aircraft lost altitude while performing a steep left turn at 100–150 m (330–490 ft). Near Dmitriyeva (now Bayserke) the left wing hit the ground and the aircraft crashed and burned out. The aircraft was operating an Alma-Ata–Karaganda–Kazan passenger service. This accident is the deadliest involving the G-2.	
27 December 1941	Unknown	S-3	CCCP-К2729	Special Western	W/O	1/1	Disappeared during a Moscow-Odoevo flight.	
29 December 1941	(Soviet Union) Chardzhou Airport	G-2	CCCP-Л2010	Uzbekistan	W/O	7/36	Shortly after takeoff from Chardzhou (now Turkmenabat), the pilot became disoriented and failed to hear the warnings from the co-pilot. The aircraft rapidly lost altitude and struck the ground 10–12 kilometres (6.2–7.5 mi) from Chardzhou and came to rest in the Amu Darya River.	
30 December 1941	(Soviet Union) Tsymlyanskaya	SP	CCCP-К287	North Caucasus	W/O	1/2	Shortly after takeoff, the aircraft climbed to 20–30 m (66–98 ft). The pilot, who was drunk, began a left turn when the aircraft stalled, struck a fence and crashed.	
4 January 1942	(Soviet Union) Sverdlovsk	DB-3F	CCCP-А645	Unknown	W/O	1/4	The aircraft was operating a charter flight from Omsk to Sverdlovsk (now Yekaterinburg). En route, weather worsened and visibility was poor due to snow. Despite this, the crew decided to continue. Approaching Sverdlovsk, the crew could not locate the airport and attempted to land, but the aircraft struck a hill and crashed.	
6 January 1942	(Soviet Union) Tula	R-5	CCCP-Х31	Unknown	W/O	0/1	Crashed on landing due to fuel exhaustion. The aircraft was completing a charter flight.	
13 January 1942	(Soviet Union) Smelovka	PS-84	CCCP-Л3438	Unknown	W/O	2/6	While returning from behind German lines a fire started inside the cabin and spread quickly. The five crew bailed out at an altitude of 350 m (1,150 ft). Of these five, one was seriously injured and another died. The sole passenger failed to bail out and also died.	
20 January 1942	(Soviet Union) Lugi	PS-84	CCCP-Л3967	MAGON	W/O	20/20	While flying to Lugi for a mission, the aircraft was struck by German flak from the ground, caught fire and crashed.	
21 January 1942	(Soviet Union) Plesnevo	PS-84	CCCP-Л3404	MAGON	W/O	0/5	After landing at Plesnevo during a mission, the aircraft could not take off due to deep snow. The Germans then bombed the area, damaging the aircraft, after which it burned out due to cannon and machine gun fire.	
21 January 1942	(Soviet Union) Lugi	PS-84	CCCP-Л3992	MAGON	W/O	0/6	The aircraft was taking part in the Vyazma landing operation. While landing at an airfield near Lugi, the aircraft tipped forward and rolled into a ditch. The aircraft was abandoned because it was behind enemy lines.	
22 January 1942	(Soviet Union) Vyazemsky District	PS-84	CCCP-Л3968	MAGON	W/O	0/5	During a mission to a point behind enemy lines, the aircraft crashed at the landing site. The aircraft burned out after being shot at by German fire.	
22 January 1942	(Soviet Union) Yudino	PS-84	CCCP-Л3979	MAGON	W/O	0/27	While on a mission behind enemy lines, the aircraft was struck by German ground fire and force-landed near Yudino. This aircraft was previously damaged by German shelling near Mozhaysk on 13 October 1941.	
25 January 1942	(Soviet Union) Molotov Airport	PS-84	CCCP-Л3479	Unknown	W/O	0/9	While on approach to Molotov the aircraft encountered heavy snow and poor visibility. After several attempts to land at a flying school, the pilot decided to land on a snow-covered field between Bolshoye Subottino and Ustinovo, but the aircraft crashed and broke up. The aircraft was operating a Krymskaya-Kuibyshev-Molotov service.	
28 January 1942	(Poland) Vyazma	PS-84	CCCP-Л3476	MAGON	W/O	5/5	Disappeared while flying from Przemysl to the Vyazma area, behind enemy lines.	
28 January 1942	(Soviet Union) Vyazma	PS-84	CCCP-Л3487	MAGON	W/O	1	While taking part in the Vyazma landing operation the aircraft was fired upon and burned by the enemy.	
28 January 1942	(Soviet Union) Zhashkovo	PS-84	CCCP-Л3934	MAGON	W/O	0	Attacked by the Germans some 3–8 km (1.9–5.0 mi) from Zhashkovo Airport and burned out. All on board escaped unhurt.	
28 January 1942	(Soviet Union) Peremyshl	PS-84	CCCP-Л3977	MAGON	W/O	3	Attacked by the Germans some 3–8 km (1.9–5.0 mi) from Zhashkovo Airport and burned out.	
29 January 1942	Unknown	S-1	CCCP-К72	Unknown	W/O	1/1	Disappeared somewhere in Russia during a mission.	
29 January 1942	(Soviet Union) Krivoi Rog	PS-84	CCCP-Л3964	MAGON	W/O	0/5	Disappeared while flying from Krasnodar to an area behind enemy lines. The pilot returned to Moscow on 23 October 1942 from a partisan detachment in the Zhitomir region. According to the pilot, the aircraft crashed near Krivoi Rog due to severe icing and the crew were captured by the Germans. The pilot escaped captivity in August 1942 and joined a partisan group.	
29 January 1942	(Soviet Union) Smolensk	PS-84	CCCP-Л3963	MAGON	W/O	5/5	Disappeared near Smolensk, behind enemy lines.	
29 January 1942	(Soviet Union) Peremyshl Airport	PS-84	CCCP-Л3905	MAGON	W/O	0/5	Struck by a Soviet fighter while taking off. Four days later, the aircraft burned out during a German air raid.	
29 January 1942	Unknown	PS-84	CCCP-Л3485	MAGON	W/O	0	Struck by enemy fire and then accidentally shot down and burned out.	
31 January 1942	(Soviet Union) Smolensk Region	PS-84	CCCP-Л3986	MAGON	W/O	5/6	The aircraft was returning from a mission on the Grabtsovo road behind enemy lines (2 km from Gorokhovo) when it was shot down by German flak on the front line.	
1 February 1942	(Soviet Union) Vyazma	PR-5	CCCP-Л2506 (tail no. 6)	Special Western	W/O	1/1	Disappeared during a communication flight; the aircraft probably crashed in the Vyazma area.	
1 February 1942	Unknown	PR-5	CCCP-Л3334	Spec. Air Liaison	W/O	0	Crashed while attempting an emergency landing in poor visibility.	
2 February 1942	(Soviet Union) Kalinin Region (Note: Dubious location)	PS-84	CCCP-Л3920	MAGON	W/O	6/6	Disappeared while flying to a site in the Kalinin region, behind German lines.	
3 February 1942	(Soviet Union) Tchern	U-2	CCCP-П117	13th Spec. Air Group	W/O	2/2	Crashed shortly after takeoff.	
3 February 1942	(Soviet Union) Belomorsk	G-1	CCCP-Л2011	Karelian	W/O	0/7	The aircraft was on a special flight on behalf of the Red Army. While flying low over a wooded area, the right engine failed due to a broken crankshaft. The pilot attempted a forced landing, but the aircraft struck tree tops and crashed. All on board, including two Red Army commanders and a chief engineer from Karelia, were rescued and survived.	
3 February 1942	(Soviet Union) Moscow	ANT-43	CCCP-Л3030	Spec. Air Liaison	W/O	4/4	The aircraft was operating a Moscow-Leningrad (now Volgograd) mail flight. After takeoff the aircraft climbed to 100 m (330 ft) over a forest and then began a left turn, apparently to return to Moscow. But on approach, at 200 m (660 ft), the aircraft began turning right, nosed down and crashed. The pilot probably experienced an unexpected situation after takeoff and decided to return, but the aircraft stalled and crashed on final approach.	
4 February 1942	Unknown	S-3	CCCP-А1196	Special Baltic	W/O	1/1	Crashed.	
6 February 1942	(Soviet Union) Ugra	R-5	CCCP-Ф90 (tail number no. 12)	Special Western	W/O	0/2	After flying over enemy lines, the aircraft was shot down by a German Ju 88 fighter.	
6 February 1942	(Soviet Union) Tchern	S-2	CCCP-К492	13th Spec. Air Group	W/O	1/2	Shot down by enemy fire.	
10 February 1942	(Soviet Union) Tchern	U-2	CCCP-И175	Special Western	W/O	1/1	Went missing.	
10 February 1942	(Soviet Union) Zheltovka	SP	CCCP-А782	Special Western	W/O	2/2	Both aircraft disappeared while delivering food to the Zheltovka area.	
10 February 1942	(Soviet Union) Zheltovka	SP	CCCP-А718	Special Western	W/O	2/2	Both aircraft disappeared while delivering food to the Zheltovka area.	
14 February 1942	(Soviet Union) Khorugh	PR-5	CCCP-Л2175	Unknown	W/O	0/1	Crashed on landing. Due to complete a Dushanbe-Khorugh cargo flight.	
14 February 1942	(Soviet Union) Leningrad	S-1	CCCP-К68	Special Baltic	W/O	1/1	Crashed en route to Pustoshikha. The aircraft was carrying ammunition.	
15 February 1942	(Soviet Union) Yakutia	PS-4	CCCP-Л1414	Yakut	W/O	0	After climbing to 35 m (115 ft), the aircraft rolled right and crashed.	
15 February 1942	(Soviet Union) Andreapol	S-3	CCCP-Л2631	Special Baltic	W/O	1/1	Crashed during a supply flight (ammunition) to Kaptelovka.	
15 February 1942	(Soviet Union) Andreapol	S-3	CCCP-А1278	Special Baltic	W/O	1/1	Crashed during a supply flight (ammunition) to Kaptelovka.	
15 February 1942	(Soviet Union) Kondrovo	S-3	Unknown	Special Western	W/O	1/1	Shot down by a German fighter.	
15 February 1942	(Soviet Union) Tchern	S-3	CCCP-А978	Special Western	W/O	2/3	The aircraft was flying two wounded soldiers to Tchern when it was shot down by two German fighters.	
15 February 1942	(Soviet Union) Frunze	PS-9	CCCP-Л189	Kazakhstan	W/O	0/3	On approach to Frunze (now Bishkek) the pilot encountered fog and was unable to locate the runway threshold area. The pilot began a go-around and a few seconds later, while in a turn, both engines quit at the same time. The aircraft stalled, struck an irrigation canal and crashed in a ravine. The engines had failed due to a loss of fuel pressure (possible fuel exhaustion).	
15 February 1942	(Soviet Union) Lake Ilmen	S-3	CCCP-А1116 (tail no. 302)	Special Baltic	W/O	0/3	The aircraft was flying two wounded soldiers from Novgorod to Dobrosti. En route the aircraft was shot down by a German fighter.	
15 February 1942	(Soviet Union) Tchern	U-2	CCCP-П673	13th Spec. Air Group	W/O	2/2	Crashed.	
15 February 1942	(Soviet Union) Lake Ilmen	S-3	CCCP-А1147	Special Baltic	W/O	2/3	The aircraft was flying two wounded soldiers from Novgorod to Dobrosti. En route the aircraft was shot down by a German fighter.	
15 February 1942	(Soviet Union) Lake Ilmen	S-3	CCCP-А913	Special Baltic	W/O	0/1	The aircraft was on a flight evacuating wounded soldiers from Novgorod to Dobrosti. En route the aircraft was shot down by a German fighter.	
16 February 1942	(Soviet Union) Odudi Pass	PR-5	CCCP-Л3316	Tajikistan	W/O	4/7	En route from Stalinabad to Khorog, the weather deteriorated and visibility was poor. The pilot decided to continue despite the conditions. While flying in cloud, the aircraft struck a rock and crashed in deep snow. All on board survived the crash, but with no food and in extreme conditions with low temperatures. Twelve days later, the pilot and three passengers left the crash site to find help, but during this trip, a passenger died of the cold. An expedition to the crash site on 12 May found three more dead, a mother and her two children.	
17 February 1942	(Soviet Union) Lake Ilmen	S-3	CCCP-Л2680	Special Baltic	W/O	2/3	The aircraft was flying two wounded soldiers from Novgorod to Dobrosti. En route the aircraft was shot down by a German fighter.	
17 February 1942	(Soviet Union) Kozhanka	U-2	CCCP-П679	13th Spec. Air Group	W/O	1/1	Shot down by a German fighter.	
17 February 1942	(Soviet Union) Tchern	S-3	CCCP-А1149	13th Spec. Air Group	W/O	3/3	The aircraft was flying two wounded soldiers from Tchern to Yelets when it was shot down by a German fighter.	
18 February 1942	(Soviet Union) Dorogobuzh	U-2	CCCP-С3833	Special Western	W/O	2/2	Went missing; probably crashed near Dorogobuzh.	
20 February 1942	(Soviet Union) Valday	S-3	CCCP-К329	Special Baltic	W/O	1/1	The aircraft was flying wounded soldiers from Kaptelovka to Andreapol when it was shot down by a German fighter.	
21 February 1942	(Soviet Union) Leningrad	S-3	CCCP-К269	Special Baltic	W/O	1/3	The aircraft was flying two wounded soldiers from Kaptelovka to Andreapol when it was shot down by a German fighter.	
21 February 1942	(Soviet Union) Leningrad	S-3	CCCP-Л3104	Special Baltic	W/O	1/3	The aircraft was flying two wounded soldiers from Kaptelovka to Andreapol when it was shot down by a German fighter.	
22 February 1942	(Soviet Union) Vorontsovka	PS-35bis	CCCP-Л2484	Kiev Spec. Air Group	W/O	1/4	The aircraft was beginning a flight to an airfield near the 'Krasny Okytabr' sovkhoz (state farm) on behalf of the Political Directorate of the South-Western Front. After takeoff, the aircraft turned right, struck trees and crashed in a forest. The aircraft took off in a headwind, but in the wrong direction given the location of the airfield.	
24 February 1942	(Soviet Union) Privolye	R-5	CCCP-Х314 (tail no. 15)	Special Western	W/O	0/2	During a bombing run, the aircraft passed behind lines when it was shot down by German flak.	
24 February 1942	(Soviet Union) Yukhnov	U-2	Unknown	Special Western	W/O	1/1	En route from Plavsk to Aduevo, the pilot deviated from the flight route to Yukhnov. The aircraft was shot down by enemy fire and crashed.	
26 February 1942	(Soviet Union) Yuryevo	S-3	CCCP-А1172	Special Baltic	W/O	2/2	Shot down by enemy fire.	
26 February 1942	Unknown	SP	CCCP-Л2053	Special Western	W/O	1/2	The aircraft was on a communication flight when it was shot down by enemy fire.	
27 February 1942	(Soviet Union) Beklemishevo	S-2	CCCP-К468	Special Western	W/O	1/1	Shot down by enemy fire.	
27 February 1942	(Soviet Union) Staraya Russa	U-2	45	Special Baltic	W/O	1/1	Mid-air collision.	
28 February 1942	(Soviet Union) Kresttsy	SP	CCCP-Л3149	Special Baltic	W/O	1/1	During a supply mission, the aircraft was shot down by enemy fire.	
28 February 1942	(Soviet Union) Slavyansk	Ya-6	CCCP-Ф128	North Caucasus	W/O	1/2	The aircraft was on a flight to Barvenkovo when it crashed. The pilot survived and was captured as a POW.	
3 March 1942	(Soviet Union) Oryol	P-5	69	Unknown	W/O	0/1	The crew encountered poor visibility due to fog. The pilot began turning to leave the area, but the aircraft stalled and crashed.	
3 March 1942	(Soviet Union) Leningrad	S-3	CCCP-А668	Spec. Air Comm.	W/O	1/1	Crashed while evacuating wounded soldiers.	
3 March 1942	(Soviet Union) Leningrad	S-3	CCCP-А1264	Special Baltic	W/O	1/1	Crashed while evacuating wounded soldiers.	
4 March 1942	(Soviet Union) Gryadki	PS-84	CCCP-Л3471	MAGON	W/O	0	The propellers were bent while landing behind enemy lines. The next morning the aircraft was burned by the Germans.	
4 March 1942	(Soviet Union) Gryadki (Note: Dubious location)	PS-84	CCCP-Л3497	MAGON	W/O	2	During takeoff from an airstrip behind German lines, CCCP-Л3996 collided with CCCP-Л3497, killing two from CCCP-Л3996; all five on board CCCP-Л3497 survived. Both aircraft were later burned by the Germans.	
4 March 1942	(Soviet Union) Gryadki	PS-84	CCCP-Л3996	MAGON	W/O	2	During takeoff from an airstrip behind German lines, CCCP-Л3996 collided with CCCP-Л3497, killing two from CCCP-Л3996; all five on board CCCP-Л3497 survived. Both aircraft were later burned by the Germans.	
5 March 1942	(Soviet Union) Sestroretsk	U-2	CCCP-П575	Special Northern	W/O	2/2	The pilot got lost and the aircraft crashed on the frozen Gulf of Finland off Sestroretsk in enemy territory. Both occupants were never found and remain missing. The aircraft was operating a medevac flight. A second U-2 (CCCP-П103) also force-landed in the same circumstances; its crew were probably captured as POWs.	
6 March 1942	(Afghanistan) Kabul	U-2	CCCP-Л2495	Uzbekistan	W/O	0/2	On approach, the aircraft crashed in a snowy field. Due to complete a diplomatic mail flight.	
7 March 1942	(Soviet Union) Maloyaroslavets	SP	CCCP-Л2595	Spec. Air Liaison	W/O	1/1	Shot down by enemy fire.	
8 March 1942	(Soviet Union) Samarkand Region	G-2	CCCP-Л1497	Uzbekistan	W/O	23/23	The aircraft took off from Urgench, despite high winds on the flight route. Due to lack of weather information on the route to Tashkent, the crew diverted to Chardzhou, but did not fly on the flight route. Radio communication with the aircraft was not possible due to lightning. Tashkent Airport managed to get in contact with the aircraft who requested weather conditions in Tashkent who then requested the location of the aircraft, but received no response. The aircraft transmitted its location several times, but could not receive a reply due to radio interference. The crew radioed having passed Nurata, but this was the last contact with the flight. The aircraft was found two days later in the Nuratau Mountains, 10–12 km (6–7 mi) northeast of Dzhush. The aircraft, operating an Urgench–Tashkent passenger service, had struck a mountain 100 m (328 ft) from the top, probably while flying too low in poor weather.	
11 March 1942	Unknown	PS-7	CCCP-Л3752	Karelian	W/O	0/4	The crew encountered poor weather en route. In cloud, the pilot decided to return and began a left turn, but the left wing struck the ground. The aircraft cartwheeled and crashed. All on board were transferred to a Moscow hospital.	
12 March 1942	(Soviet Union) Novy Mokh	U-2	72	Special Baltic	W/O	2/2	Crashed.	
12 March 1942	(Soviet Union) Uka	PR-5	CCCP-Л3355	Far East	W/O	5/5	The aircraft was operating a Ust-Bolsheretsk–Ust-Kamchatsk–Tilichiki charter flight. The aircraft completed the first leg, and the crew stayed overnight in Ust-Kamchatsk. At the airport, the crew drank and did not get enough sleep. The next day the aircraft took off for the second leg, despite the pilot not feeling well. The aircraft radioed that they had passed Ozernaya. Thirty minutes later, in good weather, the aircraft entered an uncontrolled descent and crashed in taiga 22 km (14 mi) north of Uka. The pilot had probably fallen asleep or lost consciousness.	
16 March 1942	(Soviet Union) Krymky	SP	CCCP-Л2700	South-Western	W/O	2/3	Shot down by enemy fire.	
16 March 1942	(Soviet Union) Olomna	S-3	CCCP-А999	Special Northern	W/O	0/1	Shot down by enemy fire.	
16 March 1942	(Soviet Union) Olomna	S-3	CCCP-Л2286	Special Northern	W/O	0/1	Shot down by enemy fire.	
16 March 1942	(Soviet Union) Olomna	S-3	CCCP-А1136	Special Northern	W/O	1/1	Shot down by enemy fire.	
16 March 1942	(Soviet Union) Dovgenke	S-3	CCCP-А642	South-Western	W/O	1/1	Shot down by enemy fire.	
17 March 1942	(Soviet Union) Staritsa	U-2	CCCP-П338	Special Baltic	W/O	1/1	Shot down by enemy fire.	
18 March 1942	Unknown	U-2	CCCP-С3446	Special Western	W/O	2/2	Disappeared while returning to base after a mission in western Russia.	
20 March 1942	(Soviet Union) Kerch	G-2	CCCP-Л2008	Moscow	W/O	0	While in cruise, the aircraft suffered bird strikes (ducks). The engine began to vibrate and lost power and the pilot descended to make an emergency landing in a swampy area near Kerch. The aircraft crashed and burned out.	
21 March 1942	(Soviet Union) Medyn	PS-84	CCCP-Л3975	MAGON	W/O	6/6	Disappeared while flying from Monino to an area behind German lines.	
22 March 1942	(Soviet Union) Ulyanovo	U-2	Unknown	Special Western	W/O	2/2	Shot down by four German Me 109 fighters.	
24 March 1942	(Soviet Union) Dmitrovka	S-2	CCCP-К491	Special Western	W/O	1/1	Disappeared during a Uspenskoye-Dmitrovka flight.	
25 March 1942	(Soviet Union) Yelets	SP	CCCP-Л2586	13th Spec. Air Group	W/O	1/1	The aircraft was operating a Yelets-Tchern mail flight. Six minutes after takeoff, while flying in poor visibility due to poor weather, the pilot lost control. The aircraft entered a dive and crashed.	
26 March 1942	(Soviet Union) Pola	U-2	34	Special Baltic	W/O	1/2	The aircraft was returning to base after a night mission to the Western Front when it encountered poor weather with snow, strong winds and icing. The aircraft iced over, lost control and crashed.	
26 March 1942	(Soviet Union) Tatiny	PS-40	CCCP-Л2466	Unknown	W/O	5/5	The aircraft was on a special flight from Myachkovo to Krasnodar. Twenty-five minutes into the flight, weather suddenly worsened with heavy snow. The pilot decided to return, but at 150 m (490 ft), the aircraft entered a dive and crashed.	
28 March 1942	(Soviet Union) Lozovenka	SKF	CCCP-А3122	Kiev	W/O	2/3	The aircraft was flying two wounded soldiers from Krutoyarovka to Izyum. Five minutes into the flight, the aircraft was shot down by a German fighter, crashed and caught fire. Although the pilot survived, he could not save the two passengers, who died when the aircraft burned out.	
31 March 1942	Unknown	U-2	Unknown	Special Western	W/O	2/2	Shot down by enemy fire and crashed somewhere in western Russia. The passenger was an officer from the headquarters.	
6 April 1942	(Soviet Union) Dvorishchi	S-3	CCCP-А1101	Special Northern	W/O	1/3	Shot down by a German fighter.	
6 April 1942	(Soviet Union) Leningrad	U-2	50	Special Baltic	W/O	2/2	Crashed.	
6 April 1942	(Soviet Union) Likhoslavl	AP	CCCP-А738	Unknown	W/O	2/2	En route to Khotilovo, the aircraft was attacked by three German fighters, after which control was lost and the aircraft crashed.	
7 April 1942	(Soviet Union) Strugi	S-3	655	Unknown	W/O	1/1	After dropping off wounded soldiers from the Western Front, the aircraft was returning to base when it was shot down by German flak. The pilot was hit and later lost consciousness, causing the aircraft to crash.	
9 April 1942	(Soviet Union) Tebleshi	R-5	41	Unknown	W/O	1/3	The aircraft was operating a flight from Myachkovo to Alehovshchina. Before the flight, the pilot was told to return in case of poor weather. After passing Dmitrov, weather worsened with drizzle, rain and fog. The pilot continued for 10 minutes and then decided to return, but it was too late. After a turn, altitude was lost and the aircraft struck trees and crashed.	
13 April 1942	(Soviet Union) Voronezh	DB-3F	Unknown	12th Spec. Air Group	W/O	2/2	Shortly after takeoff, while climbing to 70–75 m (230–246 ft), the aircraft nosed up, stalled and rolled to the right, after which it descended and crashed out of control. The pilot had not placed the elevator trim tab in the correct position for takeoff.	
18 April 1942	(Soviet Union) Belomorsk	U-2	CCCP-П520	Karelo-Finnish	W/O	1/2	The aircraft was operating a Kolezhma-Sosnovets charter flight. Due to the excellent weather, the pilot flew west for about 45 km (28 mi) at a height of 10–15 m (33–49 ft) when the right wing struck a pine tree and the aircraft crashed in a forest, probably 25 km (16 mi) north of Belomorsk. The passenger survived and walked until he found help. The wreckage was never found; the pilot was flying too low.	
19 April 1942	(Soviet Union) Mount Gora Markou	R-5	CCCP-Л1732	Turkmenistan	W/O	1/1	Disappeared during a weather flight; the aircraft was found a week later on 25 April just below the top of Mount Gora Markou. The pilot probably lost control in extreme weather with clouds and turbulence.	
19 April 1942	(Soviet Union) Mount Karzhantau	PS-40	CCCP-Л3541	Moscow-Irkutsk	W/O	3/3	Disappeared while being ferried from Tashkent to Semipalatinsk (now Semey). Before taking off from Tashkent, ATC reported that the weather conditions were deteriorating, with clouds covering the mountains. The aircraft took off from Alma-Ata, although Tashkent Airport personnel did not know of the flight plan and also did not check up on the crew. Forty minutes after the aircraft took off from Alma-Ata, a sandstorm erupted between Dzhambul and Frunze. The wreckage was found in 1943 in the mountains near Karzhantau Saylyk, 70 km (43 mi) northeast of Tashkent. The crew had become disoriented and the aircraft struck a mountain.	
21 April 1942	(Soviet Union) Yelets	PR-5	CCCP-Л3339	Unknown	W/O	2/2	Disappeared during a Moscow-Yelets flight.	
21 April 1942	(Soviet Union) Slavyanoserbsk	SP	CCCP-А3166	Southwestern	W/O	3/3	Shot down by a German fighter en route a Rubizhnaya-Rostov flight.	
24 April 1942	Unknown	DB-3	Unknown	12th Spec. Air Group	W/O	0/2	The left engine lost fuel pressure and power in flight, followed by the right engine 18 minutes later. The pilot descended and made a forced landing in a swampy area after which the aircraft burned out. The crew had mismanaged the fuel system, causing both engines to quit.	
3 May 1942	(Soviet Union) Vypolzovo	PS-84	CCCP-Л3980	MAGON	W/O	4/5	Shortly after takeoff, the left wing struck a pole following a loss of power in the left engine and the aircraft crashed.	
12 May 1942	Unknown	PS-84	CCCP-Л3999	MAGON	W/O	27/27	Shot down while returning to Kubinka from Bolshoye Veregovo, behind German lines.	
26 May 1942	Unknown	PS-84	CCCP-Л3935	MAGON	W/O	0/7	Shot down by an enemy fighter. The aircraft crashed and burned out.	
6 June 1942	(Soviet Union) Kubinka Airport	PS-84	CCCP-Л3952	MAGON	W/O	1/6	Burned out during an air raid.	
12 June 1942	(Soviet Union) Leningrad	PS-84	CCCP-Л3933 (Note: The aircraft was originally allocated as CCCP-Л3935.)	MAGON	W/O	0/3	Crashed on takeoff following right engine failure.	
13 June 1942	Unknown	PS-84	CCCP-Л3961	MAGON	W/O	0/6	During landing at the "Zuts" site the aircraft got stuck as the airfield was in poor condition. Because the area was surrounded by the Germans, the crew stripped and burned the aircraft.	
14 June 1942	(Soviet Union) Vyazma	PS-84	CCCP-Л4001	MAGON	W/O	6/6	Disappeared during a mission near Vyazma.	
18 June 1942	(Soviet Union) Khodynka Field	PS-84	CCCP-Л3423	Moscow-Irkutsk	W/O	13	The aircraft was beginning a Moscow-Kazan-Khabarovsk flight. After takeoff the right engine began vibrating, and the crew attempted to correct this by adjusting the mixture control on the carburetor. The engine then failed altogether, causing a loss of altitude. The aircraft struck a telegraph pole along a rail line and crashed on the rails near the Moscow-Butyrskaya tovarnaya railway station and burned out. Poor maintenance and a design flaw were blamed.	
18 June 1942	(Soviet Union) Yelets	PS-84	CCCP-Л3484	MAGON	W/O	5/7	While on approach to Yelets from a partisan airstrip behind German lines the aircraft encountered poor weather. After circling the airport three times, the aircraft went into a dive on final approach at 40–50 m (130–160 ft) and crashed.	
19 June 1942	(Soviet Union) Novosibirsk	PS-84	CCCP-Л3447	Unknown	W/O	1/4	Crashed shortly after takeoff due to engine failure. The mechanic made an error in managing the fuel system, causing the left engine to quit.	
26 June 1942	(Soviet Union) Iventsevo	PS-84	CCCP-Л3948	MAGON	W/O	4/4	While flying over the front line, the aircraft was struck by anti-aircraft fire from the ground. The left engine caught fire, forcing the crew to make a forced landing in a field near Ivantsevo. But while performing a right turn at low height, the right wing struck trees. The aircraft crashed nose-down and burned out. The aircraft was operating a Stockholm-Kalinin cargo service.	
28 June 1942	(Soviet Union) Sevastopol Airport	PS-84	CCCP-Л3997	MAGON	W/O	0/6	While taxiing the aircraft ran into a bomb crater, collapsing the landing gear and damaging the propellers. The aircraft was burned a few days later.	
6 July 1942	(Soviet Union) Khlevnoye	PS-84	CCCP-Л3945	MAGON	W/O	0/8	Crashed following a Luftwaffe attack.	
6 July 1942	(Soviet Union) Khlevnogo	PS-84	CCCP-Л3954	MAGON	W/O	0/8	The pilot became disorientated and flew too close to the German line. German fighters opened fire on the aircraft, shooting it down.	
8 July 1942	(Soviet Union) Yelets	PS-84	CCCP-Л3437	MAGON	W/O	0/6	Shot down and caught fire following a German attack. The aircraft burned out. The sole passenger on board was the chief of staff of the 568th Regiment.	
11 July 1942	(Soviet Union) Novokhopersk	PS-84	CCCP-Л3981	MAGON	W/O	0/6	Struck by German fire and crashed and burned out.	
23 July 1942	Unknown	PS-84	CCCP-Л3461	Azov-Black Sea	W/O	Unknown	Crashed due to pilot errors.	
27 July 1942	(Soviet Union) Paskovayka	PS-84	CCCP-Л3983	MAGON	W/O	0/33	Struck by German ground fire and crashed.	
10 August 1942	(Soviet Union) Stalingrad Airport	PS-84	CCCP-Л3492	MAGON	W/O	Unknown	Destroyed in a Luftwaffe bombing raid.	
12 August 1942	(Soviet Union) Zhirkov	PS-84	CCCP-Л3921	Unknown	W/O	6/6	Shot down by anti-aircraft fire after on an ammunition air-drop mission for a Soviet army unit surrounded by German troops near Zhirkov.	
13 August 1942	(Soviet Union) Verkhnyaya Akhtuba Airport	PS-84	CCCP-Л4007	MAGON	W/O	3/7	While flying over the airport the aircraft was attacked by German fighters, starting a fire. The aircraft landed in flames at the airport and then burned out following landing.	
25 August 1942	(Soviet Union) Tashkent Airport	PS-84	CCCP-Л3432	Moscow	W/O	0	Due to pilot error, the aircraft lifted off at low speed. After flying at 3–5 m (10–16 ft) for some 250–350 m (820–1,150 ft), the aircraft banked left, causing the left wing tip and propeller to hit the ground. The aircraft crashed and burned out.	
11 November 1942	(Soviet Union) Shemakha	PS-35bis	CCCP-Л2483	Ukraine	W/O	5/6	The aircraft was operating a Baku-Tbilisi flight. Fifteen minutes after takeoff, at 900 m (3,000 ft), the aircraft hit the side of a mountain.	
17 November 1942	(Soviet Union) Krasnoyarsk	PS-84	CCCP-Л3965	5th Ferry Reg.	W/O	20/20	Shortly after takeoff the aircraft entered a nosedive due to overloading and fuselage and wing icing and crashed. The aircraft was operating a non-scheduled Krasnoyarsk-Kirensk passenger service, flying the ALSIB (Alaska-Siberia) route.	
8 December 1942	(Soviet Union) Mount Menshy Brat	Li-2	CCCP-Л5805	Uzbekistan	W/O	8/8	The aircraft was being delivered to the Soviet Air Force when it crashed into a mountain following a loss of altitude in poor visibility and icing conditions.	
14 December 1942	(Soviet Union) Tashkent	PS-124	CCCP-Л760	Uzbekistan	W/O	36/36	Crashed after a passenger took the controls and disengaged the autopilot, sending the aircraft into a nosedive from 500 m (1,600 ft). The aircraft was operating a domestic scheduled Chardzhou (now Türkmenabat)-Tashkent passenger service.	
22 December 1942	(Soviet Union) Yanaul	PS-84	CCCP-Л3903	Ural	W/O	10/12	En route to Sverdlovsk (now Yekaterinburg), the crew encountered severe icing conditions while flying through clouds at 400 m (1,300 ft). The crew diverted to Yanaul, but the crew abandoned the approach and performed a go-around. The aircraft stalled in a steep turn during the go-around and crashed near a meat-processing plant. The aircraft was operating a domestic scheduled Moscow-Kazan-Sverdlovsk passenger service.	
23 January 1943	(Soviet Union) Myakinino	PS-84	CCCP-Л3443	1st Airborne Div.	W/O	5/10	While on approach to Moscow, the crew could not locate Vnukovo Airport. The crew diverted to Khimki but were not able to land. While circling over northwest Moscow for an airfield, the aircraft lost altitude and struck a barn and crashed at the "16th Party Congress" sovkhoz (state farm). The aircraft was operating a Khvoinaya-Moscow cargo service.	
2 March 1943	(Soviet Union) Mount Ketan-Dag	Li-2	CCCP-Л3495	7th OAP	W/O	2/6	Caught in a downdraft, the aircraft struck the side of Mount Ketan-Dag, 45 km (28 mi) northeast of Yerevan. The aircraft was operating a domestic scheduled Yerevan–Tbilisi passenger service.	
5 March 1943	(Soviet Union) Berdigestyakh	PS-84	CCCP-Л3913	3rd Ferry Reg., KVT	W/O	3/11	While en route to Olyokminsk from Yakutsk the aircraft encountered heavy snow while flying at 150 m (490 ft). Both engines lost power, causing a loss of altitude. The aircraft crashed in a forest.	
27 March 1943	(Soviet Union) near Khodynka Aerodrome	PS-84	CCCP-Л3440	4th OAP	W/O	2/14	Shortly after takeoff the left engine began having problems, probably due to the use of low-octane fuel. The pilots decided to return but they performed a 180 degree turn to land in the opposite direction. While landing the aircraft came in too high and banked left to avoid a parked aircraft. The left wing hit the ground and the aircraft crashed. The aircraft was operating a domestic scheduled Moscow–Khvoinaya passenger service.	
11 May 1943	(Soviet Union) Molotov	PS-84	CCCP-Л3931	1st Airborne Div.	W/O	1/5	The aircraft was on a test flight following an engine change. Shortly after takeoff, the flight engineer made a mistake in handling the fuel system, causing both engines to quit. The pilot attempted to return to the airport but the aircraft was flying too low, and it struck the roofs of two houses and crashed in the outskirts of Molotov, damaging a third house.	
20 May 1943	(Soviet Union) Sochi	PS-84	CCCP-Л3909	1st Airborne Div.	W/O	6/6	Struck a mountainside near Sochi 500 m (1,600 ft) from the coast while on approach in bad weather. The aircraft was operating a supply flight for partisans in the Crimea when the aircraft had to turn around due to poor weather over the drop targets. The crew could not divert to Sukhumi also due to poor weather.	
24 May 1943	(Soviet Union) Zavodskoy Airfield	DC-3-196A	URSS-B	Moscow	W/O	1/20	The aircraft took off from Saratov in the opposite direction due to crosswinds. The aircraft then lifted off near the end of the runway, but with a hill ahead the pilot banked left at low speed and low altitude to clear the hill, the aircraft stalled and crashed into an earthen wall. The aircraft was operating a domestic scheduled Baku–Saratov–Moscow passenger service.	
29 May 1943	(Soviet Union) Yegorevsk	Li-2	CCCP-Л3499	9th OAP	W/O	0/14	The aircraft was operating a flight from Krasnodar to Moscow. Five hours and 30 minutes into the flight, the oil pressure in the right engine began to drop; the engine was also vibrating slightly. The engine was shut down and the flight continued on the remaining engine. Ten minutes later the left engine began overheating and the crew decided to make an emergency landing at Yegorevsk, but the pilot had difficulty calculating the glide pattern. A go-around was performed, but too late, and the aircraft could not gain sufficient speed and altitude. The tail caught the roof of a building and the aircraft crashed. The oil tanks had not been filled with enough oil.	
2 June 1943	(Soviet Union) Trubchevsk	Li-2	CCCP-Л4024	1st Airborne Div.	W/O	4/7	Struck by German anti-aircraft artillery fire and crashed after completing a supply mission for partisans on the Bryansk front. Three crew bailed out: one was captured by the Germans, another shot himself to avoid capture, and the third reached the partisans on 13 July, returning on 8 November.	
3 June 1943	(Soviet Union) Ivanovo	PS-84	CCCP-Л3932	5th OAP	W/O	5/8	Thirty-five minutes after takeoff at 200–250 m (660–820 ft), the right engine lost power and quit, soon followed by the left engine. The pilot decided to make a forced landing but the aircraft struck trees and crashed and burned. The flight engineer had forgotten to switch the tanks in time.	
29 June 1943	(Soviet Union) Yevlakh	Albemarle	CCCP-Л403	1st Airborne Div.	W/O	0/7	The aircraft was on a route-proving flight from Moscow to Tbilisi. The crew decided to land at Yevlakh due to an oil leak on the left engine. However, due to a design fault in the 'Exactor' propeller control system, the propeller pitch increased, reducing engine thrust. The aircraft could not reach Yevlakh and a forced landing was carried out.	
18 July 1943	(Soviet Union) Osipovka	PS-84	CCCP-Л4000	1st Airborne Div.	W/O	0/15	The aircraft was evacuating wounded partisan fighters. Because the area was soaked by rain, the aircraft could not take off and was moved and camouflaged near the landing site. German forces pounded the area for one hour and the aircraft was hit several times, suffering bullet holes as well as a punctured oil cooler on the left engine. After fixing the oil cooler the aircraft took off, but just seconds after takeoff the left engine quit. The aircraft began to roll to the left and struck the ground and crashed in a swamp. Forty to forty-five minutes later the aircraft was attacked by a German Fw 189 and burned out.	
30 July 1943	(Soviet Union) Zhukovka	PS-84	CCCP-Л3489	1st Airborne Div.	W/O	1/6	While en route to an area behind German lines the aircraft was attacked by Luftwaffe fighters. The aircraft crashed following a fire; all six crew bailed out but one did not survive.	
30 July 1943	(Soviet Union) Mogilev Region	PS-84	CCCP-Л3912	1st Airborne Div.	W/O	5/7	Caught fire and crashed in Belarus following an attack by a Luftwaffe fighter while on a supply flight for partisans. A crewmember and the sole passenger bailed out of the aircraft and survived; the remaining crew remain MIA.	
8 August 1943	(Soviet Union) Balashov Airfield	PS-84	CCCP-Л3982	1st Airborne Div.	W/O	6/6	Stalled and crashed shortly after takeoff. The aircraft was carrying three Klimov M-105 engines. During takeoff one of the engines broke through the cabin floor, trapping the control cable of the horizontal stabilizer which ran under the floor. The pilot tried to steer the aircraft with the stabilizer trim tabs, but the aircraft did not respond. The aircraft crashed in the steppe some 7 km (4.3 mi) from takeoff and burned out. The aircraft was operating a Balachov-Kursk cargo service. The engine had not been secured properly.	
21 August 1943	(Soviet Union) Akhtyrka	Li-2	CCCP-Л4034	1st Airborne Div.	W/O	Unknown	Disappeared while on a flight from Oboyan to an area behind German lines, 20 km (12 mi) from Mirgorod. The aircraft was last seen flying over the front line near Akhtyrka. All crew declared MIA and presumed dead.	
22 August 1943	(Soviet Union) Rechitsa	PS-84	CCCP-Л3956	1st Airborne Div.	W/O	5/6	Thirty minutes after takeoff from "Airstrip No. 17", an engine failed at 200–300 m (660–980 ft). The crew attempted to return, but altitude was lost and the aircraft struck trees and crashed in a forest.	
27 August 1943	(Soviet Union) Vitebsk Region	Li-2	CCCP-Л4047	1st Airborne Div.	W/O	6/6	Disappeared following an attack at 1,300 m (4,265 ft), 58 km (36 mi) southwest of Nevel, by a Luftwaffe fighter. Neither the aircraft nor the crew (declared MIA) have been found.	
28 August 1943	(Soviet Union) Khvoinaya Airport	PS-84	CCCP-Л3959	1st Airborne Div.	W/O	2/6	The aircraft returned to Khvoinaya due to poor weather at their destination of Lake Onega. Weather at Khvoinaya was even worse, with a thunderstorm in the area. During the first attempt to land the crew performed a go-around. The crew was then blinded by lightning and became disoriented, causing the aircraft to bank left and crash.	
14 September 1943	(Soviet Union) Toropa	PS-84	CCCP-Л4012	1st Airborne Div.	W/O	6/6	The aircraft was returning from a supply flight for partisans in Belarus when it was attacked by a Luftwaffe Bf 110 fighter. An in-flight fire resulted, and the aircraft crashed near the front line.	
19 September 1943	(Soviet Union) Yakhnovo Airfield	PS-84	CCCP-Л4008	1st Airborne Div.	W/O	17/17	While between Khvoinaya and Leningrad the crew became disoriented. The crew then decided to return to Khvoinaya, but diverted to Yakhnovo due to poor weather at Khvoinaya. The crew abandoned the first landing attempt, then both engines quit because the flight engineer forgot to switch the fuel tanks. Altitude was lost and the aircraft crashed in a swamp.	
20 September 1943	Unknown	Li-2	CCCP-Л4029	Moscow	W/O	5/5	The inexperienced crew deviated from the flight route by 68 km (42 mi) to the northwest. The crew then attempted to land at their destination on time, but by then the left engine had failed and the aircraft was low on fuel. The aircraft crashed into the ground while in an approach pattern to land at Tashla.	
10 October 1943	(Soviet Union) Bereznik	G-2	Unknown	5th OAP	W/O	1/16	The aircraft left Segezha on a supply mission to a lake. While on approach to the target area, the aircraft came under attack from German anti-aircraft fire. After three unsuccessful attempts to approach the zone, the pilot left the area and flew east, climbing to 2,600 m (8,500 ft), ultimately flying into clouds. The crew became disorientated and with fuel running low, an emergency landing was attempted, but the aircraft crashed in a wooded area.	
24 October 1943	(Soviet Union) Asha	Ju 52/3m	CCCP-Л37	Moscow	W/O	5/5	Crashed and burned out.	
24 October 1943	(Soviet Union) Salavat	G-2	CCCP-Л3050	Moscow	W/O	1/6	The aircraft was operating a Chelyabinsk-Kuybyshev (now Samara) cargo flight. Fifty minutes after takeoff, approaching the Ural Mountains, the crew realized that they could not overfly the mountains. The pilot turned left and slowly climbed to 1,200 m (3,900 ft). A few minutes later, the aircraft encountered katabatic winds, snow, strong winds and turbulence. The crew could not maintain altitude and were unable to overfly the mountains, the pilot decided to make an emergency landing. At 65 km/h (40 mph), the pilot made a final left turn when the aircraft struck tree tops and crashed in a wooded area on the side of a mountain and partially burned out. The female copilot, the only casualty, died of a heart attack.	
18 December 1943	(Soviet Union) Ramenye	C-47A	CCCP-Л825	1st Airborne Div.	W/O	14/14	While on a supply flight for partisans in the area of Lake Lubans in eastern Latvia behind German lines, the crew was not able to locate the target area due to fog and low clouds. The crew decided to return to Staraya Toropa, but while attempting to land, the aircraft crashed in a meadow near Ramenye.	
21 December 1943	(Soviet Union) Vnukovo Airport	Li-2	CCCP-Л4032	1st Airborne Div.	W/O	3/7	During a training flight both engines quit due to a design defect of a fuel tank, causing a loss of altitude and speed. The trainee pilot pulled back on the controls but this caused the aircraft to stall. The aircraft crashed in a forest 800 m (2,600 ft) from the airport.	
13 January 1944	(Soviet Union) Svoryn	C-47A	CCCP-Л837	1st Airborne Div.	W/O	0/18	The aircraft was operating a supply flight for the "Sikorski" partisan unit in the area near Svoryn. The aircraft attempted to take off from a short, waterlogged runway at low speed, but the left wing struck the ground and the aircraft crashed. The aircraft was abandoned because the accident occurred behind German lines.	
12 February 1944	(Soviet Union) Novoyuryevka	Li-2	CCCP-Л4068	Moscow	W/O	6/6	Stalled at 30–40 m (98–131 ft), banked right and crashed shortly after takeoff. The elevator trim tabs were not set correctly before takeoff. The aircraft was operating a Gorky-Kuibyshev cargo service.	
13 February 1944	Unknown	C-47A	CCCP-Л846	1st Airborne Div.	W/O	5/5	Disappeared while flying from Kudrovo (near Leningrad) to an area behind German lines. Neither the crew nor the aircraft have been found.	
17 February 1944	(Soviet Union) Tartu	C-47A	CCCP-Л847	1st Airborne Div.	W/O	6/6	Disappeared while flying from Kudrovo to the area of Tartu to paradrop a reconnaissance team behind German lines. Neither the crew nor the aircraft have been found.	
27 February 1944	Unknown	Li-2	CCCP-Л4076	1st Airborne Div.	W/O	Unknown	Disappeared between Nikopol and Krivoi Rog while on a flight from Melitopol to an area behind German lines to support the 3rd Ukrainian Front offensive. All occupants of the aircraft, including both pilots, were declared MIA and presumed dead as the aircraft was never found.	
4 March 1944	(Soviet Union) Vnukovo Airport	C-47A	CCCP-Л875	1st Airborne Div.	W/O	0/5	The aircraft was on a positioning flight from Vnukovo to Khodynka. During the flight, one engine was shut down for training purposes, but it could not be restarted. The pilot then returned to Vnukovo but touched down too late and the crew performed a go-around, but before gaining sufficient altitude, the aircraft hit a parked Bell P-39Q Airacobra (42-2226), crashed in a revetment and burned out.	
8 March 1944	(Soviet Union) Novoyuryevka	Li-2	CCCP-Л4064	1st Airborne Div.	W/O	8/8	The aircraft was attacked by four Luftwaffe Bf 109s while paradropping supplies for units of the 3rd Ukrainian Front. The aircraft crashed after a fire broke out.	
20 March 1944	(Soviet Union) Yanovshchina	PS-84	CCCP-Л3990	1st Airborne Div.	W/O	7/8	The aircraft was shot down by a Luftwaffe fighter while on a supply flight from Staraya Toropa to partisans behind German lines.	
11 April 1944	(Soviet Union) Kolomyya	C-47A	CCCP-Л853	1st Airborne Div.	W/O	0	Overran the runway on landing and ran down a slope after the crew was interfered by another person in the cockpit who forced the crew to land in the opposite direction.	
14 April 1944	(Soviet Union) Rechitsa	C-47A	CCCP-Л877	1st Airborne Div.	W/O	0	The aircraft was accidentally shot down by Soviet anti-aircraft fire when it flew over the Dnepr River bridge.	
16 May 1944	(Soviet Union) Kiev	Li-2	CCCP-Л4063	1st Airborne Div.	W/O	0	While parked at an airport in Kiev, the radio operator refilled his lighter through a filler syringe and spilled fuel in the process. While testing the lighter the fuel-soaked floor caught fire and the aircraft burned out.	
18 May 1944	(Soviet Union) Ploskin	C-47A	CCCP-Л833	1st Airborne Div.	W/O	3/6	While returning from a supply flight for the "Kuibyshev" partisan unit, the pilot thought the aircraft had been attacked. The aircraft descended to a low altitude, but the wing struck treetops and the aircraft crashed and burned out.	
30 May 1944	(Soviet Union) Novy Dvor	C-47	CCCP-Л843	1st Airborne Div.	W/O	8/8	The aircraft was operating a supply flight for the "V.Z Korzh" partisan group in Starobinsk District (now Soligorsk District), Minsk Region. The aircraft attempted to land at a provisional airstrip near Khorostov in poor weather, but due to a tailwind the aircraft touched down late and bounced on landing. The pilot then performed a go-around, but the aircraft struck trees and crashed on the southern edge of the landing strip.	
27 June 1944	(Soviet Union) Lake Palik	C-47A	CCCP-Л882	1st Airborne Div.	W/O	2/5	While dropping supplies for partisans in the Lake Palik area, a parachute became entangled in the tail, causing a loss of control. The aircraft lost altitude until the parachute's cargo caught in a tree and the aircraft crashed in a swamp.	
13 July 1944	(Soviet Union) Avgustova	C-47A	CCCP-Л876	1st Airborne Div.	W/O	6/6	En route to Kutski the aircraft encountered poor weather and low visibility. The crew were unable to locate the Kutski airstrip. The aircraft descended until it struck trees and crashed nose-down.	
15 July 1944	Unknown	ANT-9	Unknown	Unknown	W/O	0	Shot down over Ukraine by Ukrainian soldiers.	
20 July 1944	(Soviet Union) Kok-Su	Ju 52/3m	CCCP-Л40	West Siberia	W/O	6/6	The aircraft was being ferried from Alma-Ata to Kuibyshev (now Samara) for state trials with the NII GVF when it crashed in a steep gorge near a mountain pass over the Dzhil-Dhuta mountain range near Kok-Su. While en route to Semipalatinsk, the crew had deviated from the flight path to avoid bad weather. Over mountains the aircraft could not gain altitude and it stalled and crashed at 2,700 m (8,900 ft).	
30 September 1944	(Soviet Union) Vyatskiye Polyany	PS-84	CCCP-Л3436	Far East	W/O	0/19	The aircraft was operating a domestic scheduled Khabarovsk–Sverdlovsk–Kazan–Moscow passenger service. Some 2 hours and 15 minutes into the Sverdlovsk–Kazan leg, the left engine failed. The pilot decided to perform an emergency landing at Vyatskiye Polyany, but miscalculated the approach and performed a go-around. Airspeed was lost while trying to "hop" over a rail line, and the aircraft crashed 50 m (160 ft) behind the rail line, destroying three wooden huts.	
13 October 1944	(Slovak Republic (1939–1945)) Hronská Breznica	Li-2	Unknown	MAGON	W/O	3/6	During a supply flight from Cherlyany, Lvov region to Tri Duby in support of the Slovak National Uprising, the aircraft was attacked by a German night fighter at 3,100 m (10,200 ft). The right engine and fuselage were hit and following a loss of altitude the aircraft crashed in the Stitna jama forest north of Brdo hill near Hronská Breznica.	
11 November 1944	(Soviet Union) Builya	C-47A	CCCP-Л835	10th Guards Defense Div.	W/O	1/15	The aircraft was operating a Moscow-Minsk-Lublin passenger service. En route to Minsk the crew encountered bad weather and low visibility. The crew became disoriented and overflew Minsk. The crew then performed a forced landing at Builya, but the aircraft came in too fast, bounced, touched down a second time and crashed in an anti-aircraft artillery trench.	
13 November 1944	(Soviet Union) Stanislav	Li-2	Unknown	Unknown	W/O	4/8	While returning from behind German lines, the crew returned to Lvov instead of Stanislav by accident. The crew immediately returned to Stanislav, but were unable to locate the airfield. The aircraft hit tree tops and crashed during the fifth attempt to land.	
15 November 1944	(Soviet Union) Off Memel	C-47	CCCP-Л928	10th Guards Defense Div.	W/O	7/7	Disappeared over the Baltic Sea while on a flight from Polan to NKGD target No. 36 (80 km (50 mi) southwest of Danzig) in bad weather.	
25 November 1944	(Soviet Union) Off Absheron Peninsula	Li-2	CCCP-Л4111	Flight Center	W/O	7/7	Crashed in the Caspian Sea during a training flight.	
7 December 1944	(Soviet Union) Orlovka	Li-2	CCCP-Л4161	19th OAP	W/O	16/16	The aircraft was operating a domestic scheduled Kishinov (now Chisinau)-Kiev-Moscow passenger service. While en route to Kiev the aircraft flew into thick fog, struck a slope of a ravine and then crashed in a field while flying too low.	
21 December 1944	Unknown	C-47A	CCCP-Л870	10th Guards Defense Div.	W/O	6/6	The aircraft was returning from a supply mission between Rzeszow and Nowy Targ for Polish partisans when it crashed. The aircraft was probably shot down by Luftwaffe fighters; the wreckage was never found.	
13 January 1945	(Soviet Union) Zavodskoy Airfield	C-47A	CCCP-Л866	10th Guards Defense Div.	W/O	6/6	While on approach to Saratov, the aircraft encountered low clouds and fog. Speed was lost while the aircraft was making a turn, and the aircraft crashed on the slope of the Korolyov Sad ravine near Zavodskoy Airfield and burned out.	
14 January 1945	(Soviet Union) Stalinabad	Ju 52/3m	CCCP-Л46	Tajikistan	W/O	3/3	Twenty minutes after takeoff the right wing caught fire, probably due to a fuel leak. The aircraft entered a dive after the right wing fuel tanks exploded and the aircraft crashed into rocks in the Rangon Mountains, near Stalinabad (now Dushanbe). The aircraft was operating a Stalinabad-Kulob cargo service.	
22 January 1945	(Soviet Union) Shelkovskaya	C-47B	CCCP-Л963	Azerbaijan	W/O	6/6	While en route to Grozny, visibility was poor. The crew descended to a low altitude and followed a rail line. In the Gudermes District the aircraft flew into thick fog. The crew followed the wrong rail line to Chervlennaya. The crew then decided to fly to Grozny directly, over the Terek Ridge. The aircraft was unable to gain sufficient altitude and struck a mountain slope. The aircraft was operating a Baku-Makhachkala-Grozny-Simferopol service.	
22 January 1945	(Soviet Union) Minsk-1 Airport	C-47A	CCCP-Л901	10th Guards Defense Div.	W/O	0/6	Crashed following double engine failure. The right engine failed 15 minutes after takeoff from Minsk. The crew returned to Minsk, but after performing two go-arounds, the left engine also failed. The aircraft struck a pole, hit a roof of a house and crashed in a garden. The aircraft was operating a Moscow-Minsk-Kaunas-Šiauliai cargo service.	
4 March 1945	(Soviet Union) Mulden	C-47A	CCCP-Л915	10th Guards Defense Div.	W/O	5/5	The aircraft was being ferried from Wormditt (now Orneta) to Insterburg (now Chernyakhovsk) when it crashed and was destroyed by fire, 3 kilometres (1.9 mi) north of Mulden (now Perevalovo), after one of the wings contacted trees while it was flying too low.	
15 March 1945	(Soviet Union) Chardzhou Airport	Ju 52/3m	CCCP-Л41	Turkmenistan	W/O	0/7	The aircraft was being flown from Ashkhabad (now Ashgabat) to Alma-Ata for overhaul by ARM-405. Near Repetek the right engine failed. The pilot decided to perform a go-around on landing at Chardzhou (now Turkmenabat) as he was not able to make out the landing sign as he was blinded by the sun. While in a left turn the aircraft lost altitude and speed and crashed into trees and an irrigation canal 4 km (2.5 mi) from the airport, breaking off the landing gear, flaps, ailerons and both outer engines.	
1 April 1945	(Soviet Union) Turovets	Li-2	CCCP-Л4038	Unknown	W/O	0/9	The aircraft was operating an international scheduled Moscow–Kiev–Kraków passenger service. En route to Kraków, the right engine developed problems. The crew decided to perform an emergency landing at Skoromokhi Airport, but the right engine caught fire and the crew made a forced landing in difficult terrain near Turovets, some 15 km (9.3 mi) east of Skoromokhi, after which the aircraft burned out. The engines had been serviced with winter-grade oil, too thin for the warmer springtime temperatures.	
19 April 1945	(Poland) Kielce	PS-84	CCCP-Л3976	10th Guards Defense Div.	W/O	11/13	Struck trees on a mountain slope and crashed after the crew deviated from the planned course due to bad weather. The aircraft operated on a Kraków-Minsk-Moscow flight in support of the People's Commissariat for Lines of Communications.	
3 May 1945	(Poland) Gleiwitz	Li-2	Unknown	Unknown	W/O	Unknown	Damaged on landing when the aircraft struck three parked Soviet Air Force Ilyushin Il-2s.	
4 December 1945	(Soviet Union) Severny Airport	C-47B	CCCP-Л950	Ural	W/O	16/16	The aircraft encountered low clouds and fog while approaching Novosibirsk. The right wing struck the wiring of a radio tower while the crew was attempting to locate the runway and the aircraft crashed out of control. The aircraft was operating a domestic scheduled Ulan Bator (now Ulaanbaatar)-Krasnoyarsk-Novosibirsk-Moscow passenger service.	
1946	(Soviet Union) Taldi-Kurgan	Ju 52/3m	CCCP-Л28	West Siberia	W/O	4/4	The aircraft was being ferried from Alma-Ata to Novosibirsk when it crashed into mountains during a thunderstorm after being re-engined.	
14 January 1946	(Soviet Union) Netrubezh, Kolpnyansky District	Li-2	CCCP-Л4150	Ukraine	W/O	22/22	En route to Moscow, the aircraft encountered icing conditions at a height of 400–600 m (1,300–2,000 ft). The resultant buffeting of the tailplane caused a portion of the left stabilizer to separate 77 minutes into the flight. The aircraft lost control and entered a tailspin. The pilot attempted to recover, but this overstressed the fuselage and the aircraft broke up at 150–200 m (490–660 ft) and crashed. The aircraft was operating a domestic scheduled Kharkov-Moscow passenger service.	
27 January 1946	(Soviet Union) Gerelde	Li-2	CCCP-Л4131	Uzbekistan	W/O	0	The aircraft was operating a Chardzhou–Urgench passenger service. Before the flight, the pilot was observed drinking several glasses of vodka. He ordered the co-pilot to perform the takeoff while staying in the cabin himself. During the flight, the pilot harassed a female passenger and asked the passengers for more vodka. Now drunk, the pilot entered the cockpit, commented on the co-pilot, and later took control. The pilot then put the aircraft into a dive, but the co-pilot was able to pull out. The aircraft went into another dive at which the co-pilot and flight engineer took control, but the propellers had hit the ground. The aircraft climbed to 100 m (330 ft) but both engines lost power and a forced landing was carried out during which the aircraft broke up. All four crew and all passengers escaped uninjured.	
31 January 1946	(Soviet Union) Solntsevo	C-47A	CCCP-Л854	Moscow	W/O	3/5	The aircraft was being ferried from Bykovo Airport to Vnukovo Airport when the left engine failed 15 minutes into the flight. The propeller could not be feathered and the crew decided to make an emergency landing at Sukovo Airfield (now the Solntsevo District in Moscow), but performed a go-around as the landing gear was not locked in time after being lowered. During climbout for the go-around, the right engine overheated and also failed. The aircraft entered a spin and crashed in a forest.	
6 February 1946	(Soviet Union) Darvaza Airport	Ju 52/3m	CCCP-Л35	Turkmenistan	W/O	6/6	Stalled and crashed while on approach following the failure of the left horizontal stabilizer.	
20 February 1946	(Soviet Union) Minsk-1 Airport	PS-84	CCCP-Л4162	10th Guards Defense Div.	W/O	0/5	Struck the ruins of a building and broke apart following an aborted takeoff when the aircraft had already lifted off.	
22 March 1946	(Soviet Union) Chukotka National District	Li-2	Unknown	Yakut	W/O	Unknown	Struck a mountainside while flying too low between mountain ranges. The aircraft was operating a domestic scheduled Anadyr-Uelkal passenger service. The pilot had a history of a lack of discipline and alcohol problems.	
22 March 1946	(Soviet Union) Bakovka	C-47A	CCCP-Л893	10th Guards Defense Div.	W/O	5/5	Crashed on a slope of a hill on the bank of the Setun River near Bakovka, Moscow Region, probably due to icing. The aircraft was operating a Moscow-Minsk-Berlin cargo service.	
2 April 1946	(Soviet Union) Mount Guram, North Ossetian ASSR	C-47A	CCCP-Л924	10th Guards Defense Div.	W/O	6/6	Struck a mountain after the crew took a shortcut while en route to Rostov. The wreckage was found on 20 July 1946 some 93 km (58 mi) to the right of the planned route. The aircraft was operating a Tbilisi-Rostov passenger service.	
28 April 1946	(Soviet Union) Kazan	Ju 52/3m	CCCP-Л27	West Siberia	W/O	0	Force-landed in wooded area near Kazan due to engine failure. Two days before, the number one piston in the left engine failed. The cylinder and piston were replaced, but the mechanic did not clean out the remains of the old piston.	
6 September 1946	(Soviet Union) Darvaza	Ju 52/3m	CCCP-Л35	Turkmenistan	W/O	6/6	The aircraft was operating a Ashgabat-Darvaza cargo service. On final approach, the aircraft pitched up, stalled and crashed short of the runway. During maintenance, several bolts were left missing in the inner part of the left elevator, causing it to fail.	
31 October 1946	(Soviet Union) Tashauz	Li-2	CCCP-Л4278	Turkmenistan	W/O	0/16	While on final approach to Tashauz the left wing caught fire. The aircraft landed safely and all on board were able to escape before the aircraft burned out. The left rear fuel tank cap was not properly closed (due to an improperly fitted fuel filter) following refueling at Ashgabat, and fuel spilled into the left wing itself during the flight. When the engines were throttled down shortly before landing, the fuel vapors ignited, starting the fire. The aircraft was operating a domestic scheduled Ashgabat-Tashauz passenger service.	
5 November 1946	(Soviet Union) Vnukovo Airport	C-47B	CCCP-Л946	10th Guards Defense Div.	W/O	13/26	The aircraft was operating a domestic scheduled Berlin–Riga-Moscow passenger service. After being in a holding pattern for two hours, the crew started the approach. The crew decided to go-around some 300 m (980 ft) past a landing sign. The aircraft was flying low and engine power was sharply increased. The aircraft went into a steep climb, lost speed and crashed 600 m (2,000 ft) from the landing sign. Most of the passengers were flying to Moscow to take part in October Revolution celebrations.	
5 November 1946	(Soviet Union) Odintsovsky District	Li-2	CCCP-Л4181	Turkmenistan	W/O	5/5	The aircraft was being ferried from Voronezh Airport to Vnukovo Airport, when it crashed in the outskirts of Moscow due to fuel exhaustion while in a holding pattern.	
5 November 1946	(Soviet Union) Vnukovo Airport	Li-2	CCCP-Л4207	Lithuania	W/O	1/26	Crashed due to fuel exhaustion after repeated approach attempts while in a holding pattern. The aircraft was operating a domestic scheduled Vilnius-Moscow passenger service. Most of the passengers were flying to Moscow to take part in October Revolution celebrations.	
9 November 1946	(Soviet Union) Ufa	Li-2	CCCP-Л4145	Privolzhsk	W/O	7/7	Ninety-five minutes after takeoff, the left engine was shut down due to low oil pressure. The pilot decided to divert to Ufa, but was unable to locate the airport due to low clouds. When the aircraft descended through clouds, the pilot realized that he was above the city. The crew increased power to the right engine, and it overheated. The pilot turned towards the Belaya River, but the aircraft later struck trees on the river bank, crashed in a forest, and burned out. The aircraft was operating a Kuibyshev-Ufa–Sverdlovsk passenger service as Flight 236. The crew had shut down the wrong engine.	
4 December 1946	(Iran) Mashhad	Li-2	Unknown	Unknown	W/O	24/24	Crashed shortly after takeoff.	
5 March 1947	(Soviet Union) Caucasus Mountains	C-47B	CCCP-Л952	Georgia	W/O	23/23	Radio contact with the flight was lost 73 minutes after takeoff. The wreckage was found on 20 June 1947 in the Caucasus Mountains. The flight was running late and the pilot straightened the route through the mountains. The aircraft encountered icing conditions and struck a mountain. The aircraft was operating a Tbilisi-Moscow passenger service as Flight 34.	
22 April 1947	(Soviet Union) Volochanka	C-47	CCCP-Л1204	Krasnoyarsk	W/O	9/34	The aircraft was operating a domestic scheduled Kosisty–Khatanga–Dudinka–Turukhansk–Krasnoyarsk passenger service. Just after takeoff the left engine began to overheat. Thirty-eight minutes into the flight the left engine lost oil pressure and was shut down, but this also caused a loss of electric power, as the generator on the other engine was not working. The crew continued on the remaining engine, but a return to Kosisty was not possible due to poor weather. The crew flew towards Khatanga, but were unable to locate the airport and continued to Volochanka. Five hours into the flight the crew encountered icing conditions, but changed course and left for better weather conditions. The number one engine overheated and failed and the pilot then force-landed the aircraft in tundra on the Taymyr Peninsula. Three days after the accident, nine people (three crew and six passengers) left the crash site to seek help and were never seen again. The pilot's skeletal remains were found in a bog 120 km (75 mi) southwest of the crash site on 23 October 1953 by a reindeer herder; nothing is known of the remaining eight. The remaining 25 survivors were rescued on 13 May 1947 by an Li-2. In 2016, the aircraft was salvaged and transported by water to Krasnoyarsk for restoration and will eventually be on display at the future Museum of the Exploration of the Russian North in Krasnoyarsk.	
16 May 1947	(Soviet Union) Khabarovsk	C-47A	CCCP-Л1048	Far East	W/O	22/22	While on approach in bad weather, the aircraft struck a tower of a broadcast station and crashed. Weather conditions were below minimum at Khabarovsk and the airport should have been closed, yet ATC allowed the aircraft to land.	
16 June 1947	(Soviet Union) Leninabad Airport	Li-2	CCCP-Л4088	Kazakhstan	W/O	3/7	Crashed on takeoff. The aircraft failed to lift off and the pilot forced the aircraft to lift off at low speed. The aircraft struck a telephone pole and a high-voltage power line at a height of just 2–3 m (6.6–9.8 ft). The aircraft, operating a Leninabad (now Khujand)–Alma-Ata cargo service, was overloaded by 627 kg (1,382 lb).	
21 June 1947	(Soviet Union) Karkinyts'ka Gulf	Li-2	CCCP-Л4138	Ukraine	W/O	8/29	Ditched in the Black Sea following a loss of engine power.	
1 July 1947	(Soviet Union) Moscow	Il-12P	CCCP-Л1317	Moscow	W/O	4/6	The left engine failed on takeoff from Vnukovo Airport, causing a loss of airspeed. The pilot attempted to return, but the aircraft lost altitude, hit tree tops and the roof of a house and crashed into a second house.	
6 August 1947	(Soviet Union) Severo-Vostochny Bank	Li-2	CCCP-Л4017	Flight Center	W/O	4/6	During a training flight, the aircraft stalled and crashed following a loss of speed while performing a left turn at 100 m (330 ft).	
19 September 1947	(Soviet Union) Vnukovo Airport	Il-12P	CCCP-Л1332	Moscow	W/O	0/0	Struck by a crashing North American B-25 (CCCP-I850) that lost control during an emergency landing. Both aircraft burned out.	
24 November 1947	(Soviet Union) Koltsovo Airport	Il-12P	CCCP-Л1356	Moscow	W/O	0/6	The aircraft was operating a Sverdlovsk–Moscow passenger service with several intermediate stops. On takeoff from Sverdlovsk the aircraft was overloaded by 330 kg (730 lb) and not properly de-iced. The aircraft failed to lift off and overran the runway, struck some bushes, ran into a hole and broke apart.	
18 December 1947	(Soviet Union) Teply Stan	C-47	CCCP-Л997	ARB-400	W/O	1	The aircraft crashed while on a test flight following an overhaul by ARB-400. While on approach to Vnukovo Airport the aircraft entered fog, struck a hill with the right wing, and crashed near kilometer 18 of the Kaluga Highway.	
18 December 1947	(Soviet Union) Krasnoyarsk	Il-12P	CCCP-Л1343	Moscow	W/O	7/25	Fifteen minutes after takeoff, the left engine was shut down due to low oil pressure. The crew returned to the airport, but on the first attempt to land the approach speed was too high and the landing gear was lowered too late. The pilot performed a go-around. On the second attempt the aircraft stalled at a height of 40–50 m (130–160 ft) and crashed. The aircraft was operating a domestic scheduled passenger service as Flight 6.	
30 December 1947	(Soviet Union) Chrysostom	Li-2	CCCP-Л4214	Moscow	W/O	6/6	Struck a mountain in the Taganai range of the Ural Mountains 20 km (12 mi) north of Chrysostom (now Zlatoust) at 1,145 m (3,757 ft). The aircraft was operating a domestic scheduled Chelyabinsk-Kazan-Moscow cargo service as Flight 20. ATC had allowed the crew to fly too low.	
3 February 1948	(Soviet Union) Transbaikal	Ju 52/3m	CCCP-Л54	Krasnoyarsk	W/O	0/2	Crashed into a mountain slope after flying through snow.	
21 April 1948	(Soviet Union) Chita	C-47B	CCCP-Л1215	East Siberia	W/O	3/6	The aircraft took off in bad weather on a rescue mission for an Li-2 (CCCP-Л4279) that had force-landed near Tynda. While en route the right engine began to vibrate severely and the propeller could not be feathered. While flying over a mountain range the aircraft could not gain sufficient altitude. The left propeller struck tree tops and the left stabilizer struck a power pole. Control was lost and the aircraft crashed into an embankment of a former rail line.	
23 April 1948	(Soviet Union) Khabarovsk Airport	Li-2	CCCP-Л4437	Far East	W/O	1/16	Swerved off the runway on takeoff. The wing hit a telegraph pole and the aircraft struck a pole of a high-voltage power line. The rudder trimmer had not been set to the neutral position before takeoff. Due to operate a Khabarovsk–Yuzhno-Sakhalinsk passenger service.	
24 April 1948	(Soviet Union) Bodaybo	Li-2	CCCP-Л4460	East Siberia	W/O	28/29	The aircraft was operating a domestic scheduled Kirensk-Bodaybo passenger service. The crew, who was drunk, deviated from the flight path in poor visibility and followed the Vitim River at a height of just 100 m (330 ft). Control was lost in a snowstorm and the aircraft crashed onto the ice of the river.	
22 May 1948	(Soviet Union) Magadan	C-47B	CCCP-Л1073	Far East	W/O	8/9	The aircraft was completing a Petropavlovsk Kamchatsky-Magadan passenger service. The weather conditions at Magadan were deteriorating, and the crew decided to divert to Seymchan. The head of Magadan Airport was drunk, and despite actions of other controllers he allowed the aircraft to descend to 300 m (980 ft). Communication with the flight was later lost, and the aircraft crashed into the slope of the Marchekanskaya sopka mountain near Magadan 70 m (230 ft) from the top.	
31 July 1948	(Soviet Union) Turukhansk	PBN-1 Nomad	CCCP-Л789	Krasnoyarsk	W/O	3/20	After an uneventful flight, the crew received permission to land, but the crew did not receive some information on water conditions. After an approach in gusty winds and high waves, the aircraft bounced twice and got to a height of 5–6 m (16–20 ft) before losing speed and nosing down into the water. The bow collapsed and broke off. The aircraft sank at a 50–60° angle; three passengers drowned. The aircraft was operating the second leg of a domestic scheduled Krasnoyarsk-Podkamennaya Tunguska River-Turukhansk-Valek passenger service.	
2 September 1948	(Soviet Union) Novosibirsk	Il-12	CCCP-Л1465	Moscow	W/O	1/20	Crashed shortly after takeoff from Severny Airport, when the flight engineer reduced engine power without regarding airspeed readings, causing the aircraft to descend until it impacted terrain. The left wing separated on impact and the aircraft turned 180 degrees before coming to rest. A propeller blade broke off and penetrated the fuselage, killing one passenger. The aircraft was due to operate the second leg of a domestic scheduled Khabarovsk-Novosibirsk-Omsk-Moscow passenger service as Flight 6.	
4 September 1948	(Soviet Union) Bykovo Airport	Li-2	CCCP-Л4498	Moscow	W/O	6/24	Immediately after takeoff the pilot ordered the landing lights turned off and the landing gear raised. The pilot became lost in the darkness and the left propeller touched the ground. The aircraft continued to fly until the left wing struck a power pole and a fence. The aircraft finally crashed in a garden and caught fire. Crew fatigue was blamed. The aircraft was operating a domestic scheduled Moscow-Kharkov-Simferopol passenger service as Flight 253.	
9 September 1948	(Soviet Union) Baymakovo Aerodrome	Il-12	CCCP-Л1427	Buguruslan AFTC	W/O	4/4	During a training flight, the pilot was practicing flying with one engine out, but the instructor feathered the propeller too soon after a go-around with the flaps deployed, causing the aircraft to enter a 30° bank and lose airspeed. Control was lost and the aircraft entered a dive and crashed near the airport.	
30 September 1948	(Soviet Union) Balkhash Airport	Li-2	CCCP-Л4304	Kazakhstan	W/O	15/15	En route to Karaganda the crew probably became disoriented while flying in clouds, causing the aircraft to enter a dive. The crew was recovering from the dive when the right wing broke off due to overstress of the airframe. The aircraft crashed in the steppe 39 km (24 mi) from the airport; wreckage was found on 10 October 1948. The aircraft was operating a domestic scheduled Alma-Ata–Balkhash–Karaganda–Kostanay–Chelyabinsk–Kazan–Moscow passenger service as Flight 60.	
12 October 1948	(Soviet Union) Yevlakh	Il-12	CCCP-Л1450	Uzbekistan	W/O	10/10	The aircraft disappeared amid inclement weather while attempting to return to Baku owing to navigation difficulties due to poor radio reception while operating the second leg of a Tashkent-Baku-Tbilisi-Sochi domestic passenger service. The wreckage was never found.	
12 October 1948	(Soviet Union) Parshino	Li-2T	CCCP-Л4658	East Siberia	W/O	4/4	Crashed in taiga near the Parshinka River and burned out due to double engine failure caused by fuel starvation. The aircraft, operating an Irkutsk–Kirensk–Bodaybo cargo service, was refueled at Kirensk with fuel contaminated by too much water which later froze, clogging the fuel system.	
25 October 1948	(Soviet Union) Samurskaya	Li-2	CCCP-Л4500	Georgia	W/O	18/18	The aircraft was operating a domestic scheduled Karachayevsk-Sukhumi-Tbilisi service. The crew, who was drunk, carried out the incorrect procedure climb and set course over mountains. The crew attempted to find a route to follow the coast line but this failed. The aircraft flew into the side of a mountain at 1,610 m (5,280 ft). The wreckage was found by accident on 8 August 1949.	
18 November 1948	(Soviet Union) Leninabad	Li-2	CCCP-Л4275	Tajikistan	W/O	4/5	Between Jizak and Leninabad (now Khujand) the aircraft encountered bad weather. While flying in cloud the aircraft was blown off course by strong winds and struck a mountain in the Mogol-Tau ridge at 700 m (2,300 ft). The aircraft was operating a Stalinabad-Leninabad-Lyubertsy cargo service.	
22 November 1948	(Soviet Union) Ryzhovo	Li-2	CCCP-Л4463	Yakut	W/O	23/26	The aircraft was completing a Yakutsk–Zyryanka-Srednekolymsk domestic scheduled passenger service. While on approach to Srednekolymsk, the crew could not get in contact with the airport and decided to land at an airstrip near Ryzhovo on the banks of the Kolyma River. During the final turn to land, the aircraft lost speed, stalled and crashed through the ice on the frozen river 400 m (1,300 ft) from the airstrip.	
23 December 1948	(Soviet Union) Moscow	Il-12P	CCCP-Л1731	Uzbekistan	W/O	12/12	Both aircraft were involved in a mid-air collision. The Il-12 was on a ferry flight from Khodynka Aerodrome to Tashkent when it collided with a TS-62 being ferried from Vnukovo Airport to Bykovo Airport. The Il-12 lost both engines in the collision, while the TS-62 had its tail sheared off.	
23 December 1948	(Soviet Union) Moscow	TS-62	CCCP-Л861	Moscow	W/O	12/12	Both aircraft were involved in a mid-air collision. The Il-12 was on a ferry flight from Khodynka Aerodrome to Tashkent when it collided with a TS-62 being ferried from Vnukovo Airport to Bykovo Airport. The Il-12 lost both engines in the collision, while the TS-62 had its tail sheared off.	
30 December 1948	(Soviet Union) near Minsk	TS-62	CCCP-Л1017	Moscow	W/O	3/4	The aircraft was involved in a landing accident at Minsk on 4 December 1948 when the right side landing gear collapsed, bending the propeller blades and causing damage to the right wing. From 15 to 21 December repairs were performed so that the aircraft could be flown to ARB-400 in Moscow for more extensive repairs. The flight to Moscow was delayed until 30 December; the aircraft took off in poor weather but crashed five minutes later in a field in a right bank. Investigation revealed that the right aileron was jammed and although it was initially thought that improper repairs were the cause, it was quickly determined that this was not the case.	
9 January 1949	(Soviet Union) Kazan	Li-2	CCCP-Л4261	Ural	W/O	3/4	Crashed after takeoff due to a loss of engine power caused by carburetor icing. The aircraft was operating a Sverdlovsk-Kazan-Moscow cargo service as Flight 38.	
19 January 1949	(Soviet Union) Stalino	Il-12P	CCCP-Л1381	Moscow	W/O	10	Crashed after takeoff following engine problems. At 90 m (300 ft), the right engine oversped while the left engine lost power. The aircraft stalled, struck a power pole and crashed in flames onto a house near the airport, killing both residents inside and all on board the aircraft except the co-pilot. Due to begin a Stalino (now Donetsk)-Kiev-Moscow passenger service.	
29 January 1949	(Soviet Union) Nizhnaya Pesha Airport	Li-2T	CCCP-Л4491	Northern	W/O	3/4	Crashed on takeoff in crosswinds. The aircraft became airborne at low speed and pitched up. The cargo shifted rearward, causing a higher angle of attack. The aircraft stalled at 15–20 m (49–66 ft) and crashed.	
12 March 1949	(Soviet Union) Mount Bel-Auty	Li-2	CCCP-Л4335	Tajikistan	W/O	11/11	The aircraft was operating a domestic scheduled Leninabad-Stalinabad passenger service. The crew decided to cut the route short and fly through the Sangardak Gorge. Mistaking the Chakchar Range for the Kushtang Range, the crew began a descent. The aircraft struck the slope of Mount Bel-Auty at 2,600 m (8,500 ft), fell down a cliff, and came to rest at 2,270 m (7,450 ft). Wreckage was found on 8 May 1949.	
29 April 1949	(Soviet Union) Off Kirensk	Li-2	CCCP-Л4464	Yakut	W/O	14/24	Went some 100 kilometres (62 mi) off course while flying the Yakutsk–Kirensk route. Having failed to establish the aircraft position, the crew decided to descend. The airplane began a descent having no visual contact with the ground, and struck a 1,300-metre-high (4,300 ft) mountain, 117 km (73 mi) east of Kirensk.	
13 May 1949	(Soviet Union) Novosibirsk	Il-12P	CCCP-Л1791	Moscow	W/O	25/25	Lost control and struck an embankment after flying into a thunderstorm. After entering the storm, the aircraft encountered turbulence and was struck by lightning, incapacitating the pilots. The aircraft began a right turn with a loss of altitude. The aircraft came out of the cloud into rain and hail, and continued to lose altitude until it struck the ground. The aircraft was operating a Moscow-Omsk-Novosibirsk-Krasnoyarsk passenger service as Flight 17.	
21 July 1949	(Soviet Union) Marga	Il-12P	CCCP-Л1714	Moscow	W/O	13/14	En route to Irkutsk the left engine lost oil and caught fire, due to a design fault. The fire was extinguished in an emergency descent, but the aircraft was unable to continue on the remaining engine. While approaching a field to make a forced landing, the left wing struck a tree on a hill and then the aircraft crashed in a forest and was destroyed by fire. The aircraft was operating a domestic scheduled Moscow-Krasnoyarsk-Irkutsk-Khabarovsk passenger service as Flight 5.	
1 August 1949	(Soviet Union) Naberezhniye Chelny	Li-2	CCCP-Л4354	Northern	W/O	2/8	While en route to Kazan, the left engine failed due to fuel exhaustion as the fuel tank selector was not switched in time. The propellers could not be feathered and the aircraft lost height and speed until it struck tree tops and crashed in a forest. The aircraft was operating a domestic scheduled Yanaul-Kazan passenger service.	
20 August 1949	(Soviet Union) Polukotelnikovo	Il-12	CCCP-Л1434	Georgia	W/O	8/11	The aircraft was operating a Tbilisi-Kharkov-Moscow passenger service. While en route to Moscow, the aircraft encountered severe thunderstorms near Belgorod and the crew attempted to navigate between two storm cells, flying at 300–570 m (980–1,870 ft). Near Oboyan the aircraft flew into severe turbulence and heavy rain and was caught in a strong downdraft. Altitude was lost and the aircraft crashed in a field.	
25 August 1949	(Soviet Union) Kabansky District	Il-12P	CCCP-Л1844	International	W/O	14/14	The aircraft descended to 1,200 m (3,900 ft) from 2,400 m (7,900 ft) while flying over the Kabanya River valley en route to Chita. The aircraft struck trees on a mountain slope, broke apart and crashed upside down at 1,400 m (4,600 ft) on the eastern shore of Lake Baikal; the cause of the descent was never determined. The aircraft was operating the second leg of a domestic non-scheduled Alma Ata-Krasnoyarsk-Chita passenger service. Government members of the self-proclaimed Second East Turkestan Republic were on board and were heading to Beijing for talks with Mao Zedong concerning the independence of the region.	
20 September 1949	(Soviet Union) Savasleyka	Il-12	CCCP-Л1462	Kazakhstan	W/O	3/4	During the flight the left engine lost oil and failed, due to improper maintenance. The crew decided to make a forced landing at Gorki but due to the loss of oil pressure the propeller could not be feathered. A rapid loss of altitude resulted and the aircraft hit trees on a hill, crashed and broke apart. The aircraft was operating the first leg of a Moscow-Sverdlovsk-Karaganda cargo service.	
16 November 1949	(Soviet Union) Vnukovo Airport	Li-2	CCCP-Л4530	North Caucasus	W/O	0/15	Completing a Rostov on Don-Kursk-Moscow passenger service, the crew attempted to land at Moscow in poor weather with low clouds and fog. The first approach was abandoned, but on the second approach the aircraft landed too late and to the right of the runway and ran off the runway into an area where earth work was taking place, suffering severe damage.	
25 December 1949	(Soviet Union) Aktyubinsk	Li-2	CCCP-Л4719	Uzbekistan	W/O	0	While on approach to Aktyubinsk, the inexperienced pilots flew too slow and the aircraft stalled at 60 m (200 ft). Although the pilots were able to recover and perform a go-around, they flew too slow on the second approach. The aircraft stalled at 15 m (49 ft) and crashed. Due to complete the second leg of a Moscow-Kuybyshev (now Samara)-Aktyubinsk-Tashkent passenger service.	
30 December 1949	(Soviet Union) Sverdlovsk	Li-2	CCCP-Л4704	Moscow	W/O	3/6	Shortly after takeoff from Sverdlovsk the cockpit windows frosted over. The crew became distracted and lost spatial orientation as they continued to fly under VFR. The aircraft lost altitude, banked right and crashed on the banks of the Iset' River. The aircraft was operating a Moscow-Sverdlovsk-Omsk-Vladivostok cargo service as Flight 1.	

== See also ==
- Aeroflot accidents and incidents
- Aeroflot accidents and incidents in the 1950s
- Aeroflot accidents and incidents in the 1960s
- Aeroflot accidents and incidents in the 1970s
- Aeroflot accidents and incidents in the 1980s
- Aeroflot accidents and incidents in the 1990s
- Transport in the Soviet Union
