= Yampil, Donetsk Oblast =

Urban locality in Donetsk Oblast, Ukraine

Yampil Ямпіль
- Rural settlement
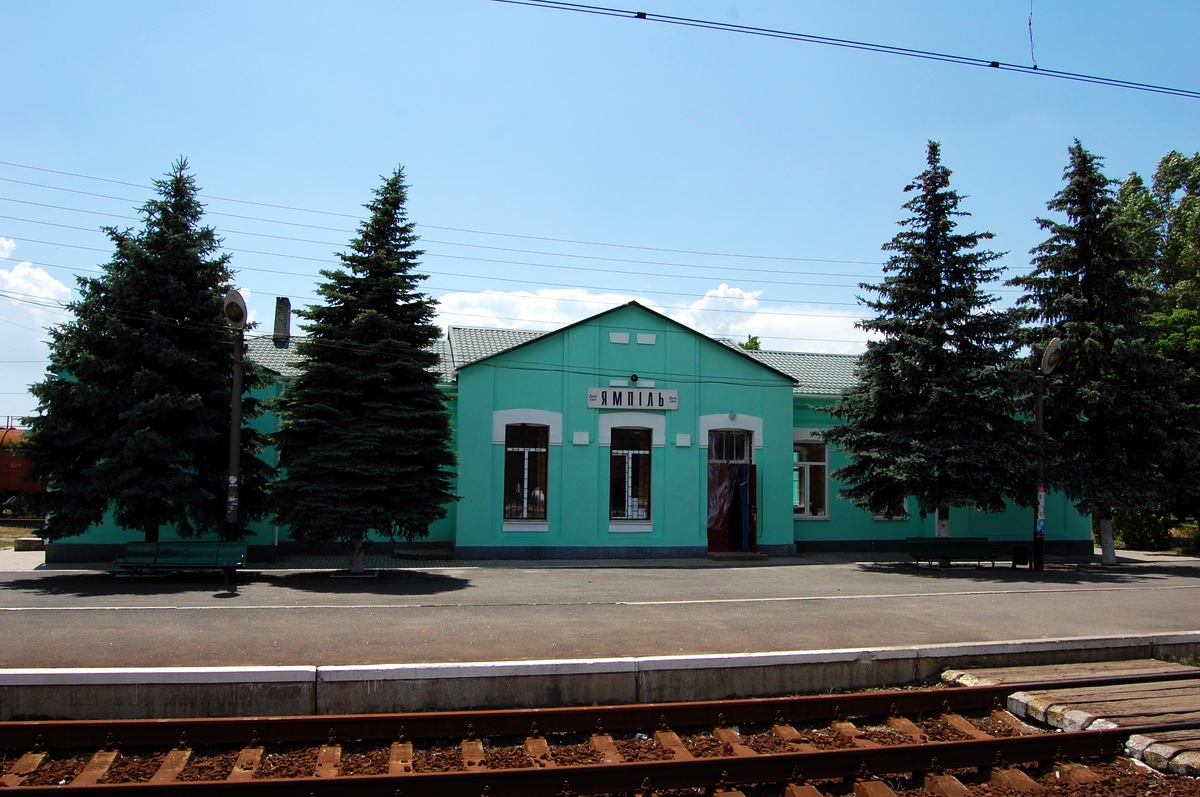
- Yampil Railstation
- Interactive map of Yampil
- Location within Donetsk Oblast Location within Ukraine
- Coordinates: 48°55′56″N 37°56′33″E
- Country: Ukraine
- Oblast: Donetsk Oblast
- Raion: Kramatorsk Raion
- Hromada: Lyman urban hromada
- First documented: 1665
- Urban settlement status: 1938

Area
  - Total: 3.87 km^{2} (1.49 sq mi)
- Elevation: 73 m (240 ft)

Population (2022)
  - Total: 1,902
  - Estimate (26 March 2024): ▼403
- Website: https://yampol-city.at.ua

Yampil (Ukrainian: Ямпіль; Russian: Ямполь) is a rural settlement in Lyman urban hromada, Kramatorsk Raion, Donetsk Oblast, eastern Ukraine. It is located to the southeast of Lyman, lying north of local road T05-13. Previously, it was administered as part of Lyman Raion. It is also home to Yampil railway station.

== History ==
Yampil's history is documented as early as 1665. Historical records indicate that the lands of present-day Yampil belonged to the Sviatohirsk Lavra monastery, which was established under the protection of the settlements of Sukhariv, Repin Yurt, and Khrestovskyi (Raihorodok). These lands later came under the control of the Torsk and Mayak Cossacks.

A survey conducted in 1703 identified 117 Cossack yards associated with the Izyum Cossack Regiment in Yampil. During this period, a chapel and a prayer house were constructed in the village. It is also likely that Pavlo Ruban served as the village head at that time.

In 1712, Yampil was designated as an outpost for Russian imperial dragoons tasked with guarding the Torsk Bakhmut salt works.

In 1718, the village faced a devastating plague outbreak. The inhabitants, led by Yampil's priest Maxim, reached out to the monks of the Sviatohirsk Lavra for assistance. During the 1720s, severe flooding from the Donets caused significant damage, prompting the village to relocate to higher ground nearby. By 1729, this new settlement was referred to as "Old Village," as it was situated near where the Repin Yurt monastery had once stood.

In 1729, a fortress was constructed in Yampil, complete with a powder cellar and cannons. However, during Catherine II's reign, this fortress was dismantled. When Emperor Alexander I ascended to the throne in 1801, all military equipment, including cannons, was removed from Yampil.

After the abolition of the Slobid Cossack regiments in 1765 and the establishment of the Kharkov Governorate, Yampil became part of the Izyumsky Uyezd within this province.

The village narrowly escaped a cholera outbreak in 1831, which claimed only five lives. However, in 1833, a significant bread crop failure led to famine among residents. Cholera returned in 1847 and 1848, resulting in 26 deaths. In 1848, cattle disease devastated local farms, and scurvy also affected Yampil in 1849, causing five deaths among non-locals.

In 1938, Yampil was officially classified as an urban-type settlement.

=== Russo-Ukrainian War ===
On June 19, 2014, the Armed Forces of Ukraine reportedly secured the settlement from pro-Russian separatists during the war in Donbas.

On April 28, 2022, the town was occupied by Russia as part of its invasion of Ukraine during the battle of Donbas. On September 30, 2022, during the second battle of Lyman in the Kharkiv counteroffensive, the town was liberated by the 214 Separate Rifle Battalion of the SOF and 103rd Territorial Defense Brigade.

The town was heavily shelled by Russian forces after the town was liberated, with it reported not a single building was left undamaged. this resulted in several inhabitants being killed or wounded as a result of this shelling. By 2024, the town was still subjected to shelling by the Russian forces.

On 29 September 2025, Russian forces re-entered the town from the north, as part of the Northeast Donetsk Oblast campaign. As of 13 November, it remained contested with further Ukrainian counterattacks. By 20 November 2025, Russian forces fully recaptured the town.

== Demographics ==
According to the census of 1762, there were 350 male residents in the village.

In 1750, there were 450 men and 405 women.

In 1790, there were 1,364 men and 1,475 women.

In 1810, there were 1710 men and 1733 women.

In 1830, there were 1,090 men and 1,200 women.

In 1850, there were 1170 men and 1248 women.

In 1970, there were 3100 inhabitants.

In 2001, there were 2,302 residents.

=== Language ===
Distribution of the population by native language according to 2001 Ukrainian census:

Language	Number	Percentage
Ukrainian	2083	90.49%
Russian	213	9.24%
Belarusian	2	0.09%
Romanian	2	0.09%
others/not specified	2	0.09%
Total	2302	100%

== Culture ==
=== Religion ===
In 1704, it is indicated that there was a chapel and a prayer house in the village. It is not known whether there was a church in the Turnip yurt (where the village was later moved), but as noted by Philaret Gumilevsky, most likely there was a chapel there.

In 1718, the village already had its own priest named Maxim.

By order of 1724 year, it was allowed to build the Mykolaiv Church in Yampil. It is unknown whether there was a church in the village before that, or whether the parishioners were content with a chapel with a priest.

In 1725, Yampil already had its own, Mykolaiv Church, whose priest was ordained, at the request of the parishioners, Athanasius Pavlov (in 1744 he transferred to the Khotmyzhsk monastery).

In 1731, as a result of the request of sotnik Stepan Gukovsky with the foreman, and priest Athanasius Pavlov, it was allowed to move the Polish Mykolaiv Church to a new place, in the "Old Village".

Among the dragoons who were brought to Yampol from all over the Russian Empire (Filaret calls them a "rabble"), schism spread. For this, an imperial decree was issued from 11 August 1732 year, which was ordered to search for schismatics and bring their hiders to trial. In response to this, on February 17, 1733, priest Athanasius replied that there were 13 schismatic families in the village. The Consistory demanded that schismatics be brought in for investigation. The schism remained in place, but already in 1858, there were no more schismatics in Yampil.

In 1733, archbishop Dosyfey Bohdanovich-Lyubynskyi issued an antimins to the church of St. Nicholas in Yampil.

From 1745, Yakiv Luchynskyi became a priest.

In 1798, a new church was built to replace the old one. The iconostasis and other things came from the previous temple.

Yampil belonged to the Kharkiv Diocese and was part of the fourth district Izyumsky Uyezd.

In 1871, the wooden church of St. Nicholas was renovated.

=== Landmarks and infrastructure ===
==== School (Yampilʹsʹkyy Nvk) ====
Most of the towns children go to the Yampil educational complex (Ukrainian: Ямпільський навчально-виховний комплекс).
School website: https://yampnvk2018.e-schools.info

==== Church ====
In the centre of the town stands the Tserkva Mykoly Chudotvortsya, an old orthodox church.

==== Railway ====
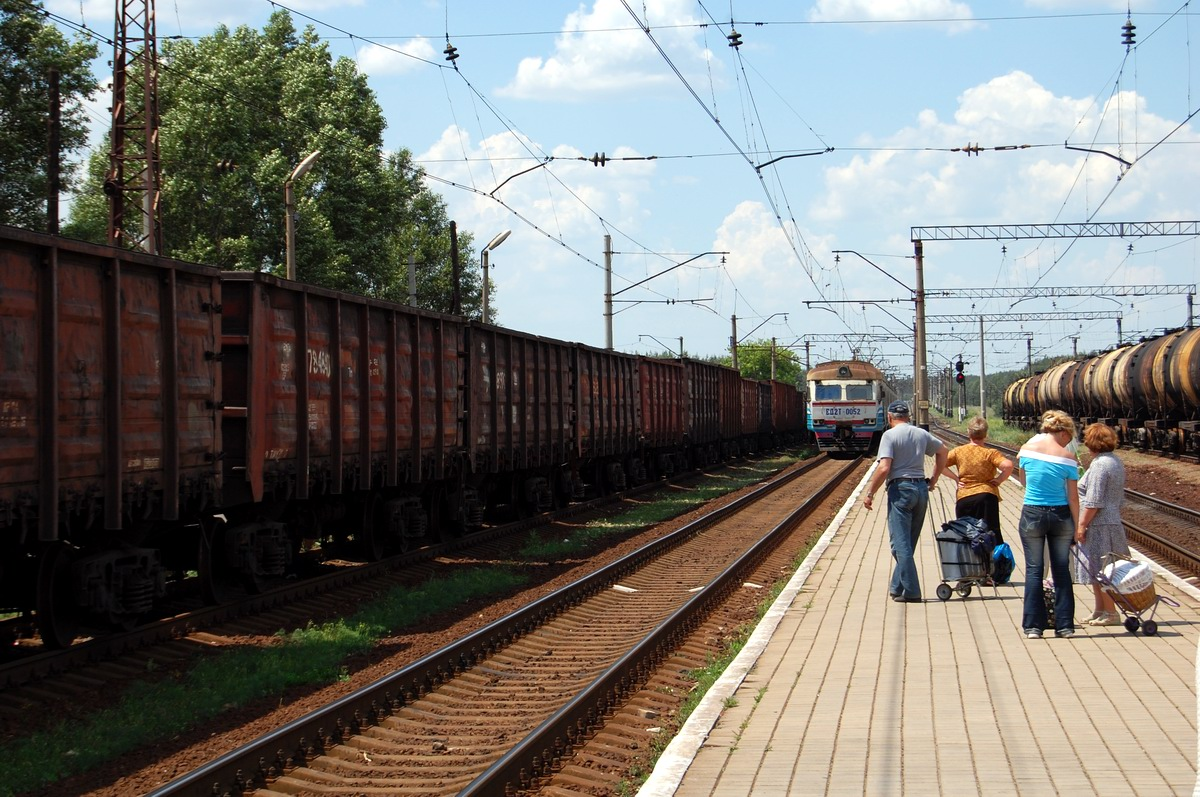

The towns railway station is important to the town and acts as logistical node. It was opened in 1911 by the North-Donetsk-Railway.

==== Ostrich farm ====
To the north of the town, there is a privately owned petting zoo, owned by Olga Mesha. Though, after the occupation by Russian forces most of the animals were dead and the farm is mostly destroyed. The zoo also housed ostriches, raccoons, rabbits, squirrels and a bear.

==== Lisove Namysto (Forest necklace) trail ====
Lisove Namysto (Ukrainian: Лісове намисто) is a forestry and trail, was built in 2011 and is located near the ostrich farm. It was utterly destroyed by the Russian forces and requires rebuilding.

Melody of the Forest Arboretum

Melody of the Forest (Ukrainian: Мелодія лісу) is an Arboretum and part of the Lisove Namysto trail.

== Economy ==
The majority of the population works in the factories of the city Lyman.

Yampil is known in the region as a place where strawberries are grown en masse, because the climate and sandy soils are the most favorable for this berry. During the season, dealers from the surrounding towns and districts gather for it, who then sell it in Bakhmut, Lyman, Soledar and others. Close to the station is a large pine forest of Liman Forestry, which stretches from Lyman through Yampil to the next railway station 438 km (Zupinny point).

== Notable people ==
- Ihor Volodymyrovych Bilevych (1971–2022) was a Ukrainian master wood carver and teacher, a sergeant in the Armed Forces of Ukraine, a participant in the Russian-Ukrainian War who was not from Yampil but died during the battle for the town on 29 September, Honored Master of Folk Art of Ukraine (2017), associate professor (2018).
- "Yampil" was the name of a 12-year-old Asiatic black bear who was rescued from the ostrich farm. He was brought to the Five Sisters Zoo in West Calder, Scotland after a short stay in Belgium. In his new home he died after an anaesthetic procedure. This was due to him suffering a head trauma in Ukraine.
