= Kozhanka =

Kozhanka (Ukrainian: Кожанка) may refer to the following places in Ukraine:

- Kozhanka, Kyiv Oblast, urban-type settlement in Kyiv Oblast
- Kozhanka, Vinnytsia Oblast, village in Vinnytsia Oblast
