= Parshino =

Parshino Passing loop
- Khutor
- Location within Volgograd Oblast Location within Russia
- Coordinates: 48°29′N 42°21′E
- Country: Russia
- Region: Volgograd Oblast
- District: Chernyshkovsky District
- Time zone: UTC+4:00

Parshino (Russian: Паршино) is a rural locality (a passing loop) in Chernyshkovskoye Urban Settlement, Chernyshkovsky District, Volgograd Oblast, Russia. The population was 5 as of 2010.

== Geography ==
The village is located 12 km of Chernyshkovsky. Yarskoy is the nearest rural locality.
