= Beklemishevo =

Beklemishevo Беклемишево
- Selo
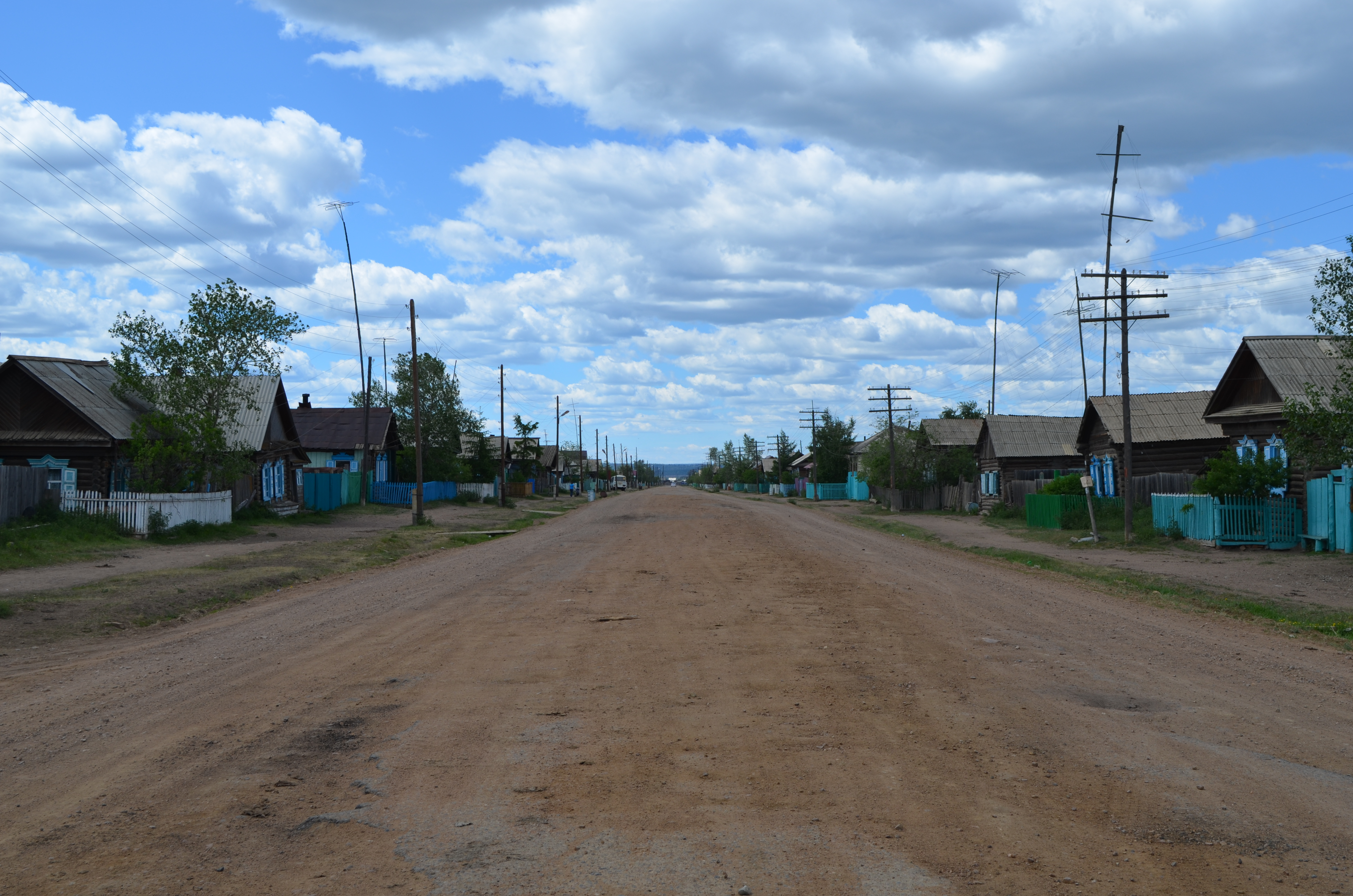

- Location within Zabaykalsky Krai Location within Russia
- Coordinates: 52°07′N 112°40′E
- Country: Russia
- Region: Zabaykalsky Krai
- District: Chitinsky District
- Time zone: UTC+9:00

Beklemishevo (Russian: Беклемишево) is a rural locality (a selo) in Chitinsky District, Zabaykalsky Krai, Russia. Population: 1,037 (2021 census); 1,152 (2010 census); 1,269 (2002 census); There are 20 streets in this selo.

== Geography ==
This rural locality is located 57 km from Chita (the district's administrative centre and capital of Zabaykalsky Krai) and 5,141 km from Moscow. Shaksha is the nearest rural locality.
