= Kozhanka, Vinnytsia Oblast =

Rural locality in Vinnytsia Oblast, Ukraine

Kozhanka Кожанка
- Village
- Location of Kozhanka within Mykolaiv Oblast#Location of Kozhanka within Ukraine Kozhanka (Ukraine)
- Coordinates: 49°18′00″N 29°16′43″E
- Country: Ukraine
- Oblast: Vinnytsia Oblast
- District: Vinnytsia Raion
- Founded: 1780
- Elevation: 253 m (830 ft)

Population (2001)
  - Total: 604
- Time zone: UTC+2 (EET)
  - Summer (DST): UTC+3 (EEST)
- Postal code: 22611
- Area code: +380 4330

Kozhanka (Ukrainian: Кожанка) is a village in Vinnytsia Raion (district) in Vinnytsia Oblast of west-central Ukraine.

Until 18 July 2020, Kozhanka was located in Orativ Raion. The raion was abolished in July 2020 as part of the administrative reform of Ukraine, which reduced the number of raions of Vinnytsia Oblast to six. The area of Orativ Raion was merged into Vinnytsia Raion.
