= Suslovo =

Suslovo Суслово
- Selo
- Location within Bashkortostan Location within Russia
- Coordinates: 55°25′N 55°42′E
- Country: Russia
- Region: Bashkortostan
- District: Birsky District
- Time zone: UTC+5:00

Suslovo (Russian: Суслово) is a rural locality (a selo) and the administrative centre of Suslovsky Selsoviet, Birsky District, Bashkortostan, Russia. The population was 647 as of 2010. There are 13 streets.

== Geography ==
Suslovo is located 12 km east of Birsk (the district's administrative centre) by road. Desyatkino is the nearest rural locality.
