= Turovets =

Turovets Туровец
- Settlement
- Location within Vologda Oblast Location within Russia
- Coordinates: 59°34′N 41°55′E
- Country: Russia
- Region: Vologda Oblast
- District: Mezhdurechensky District
- Time zone: UTC+3:00

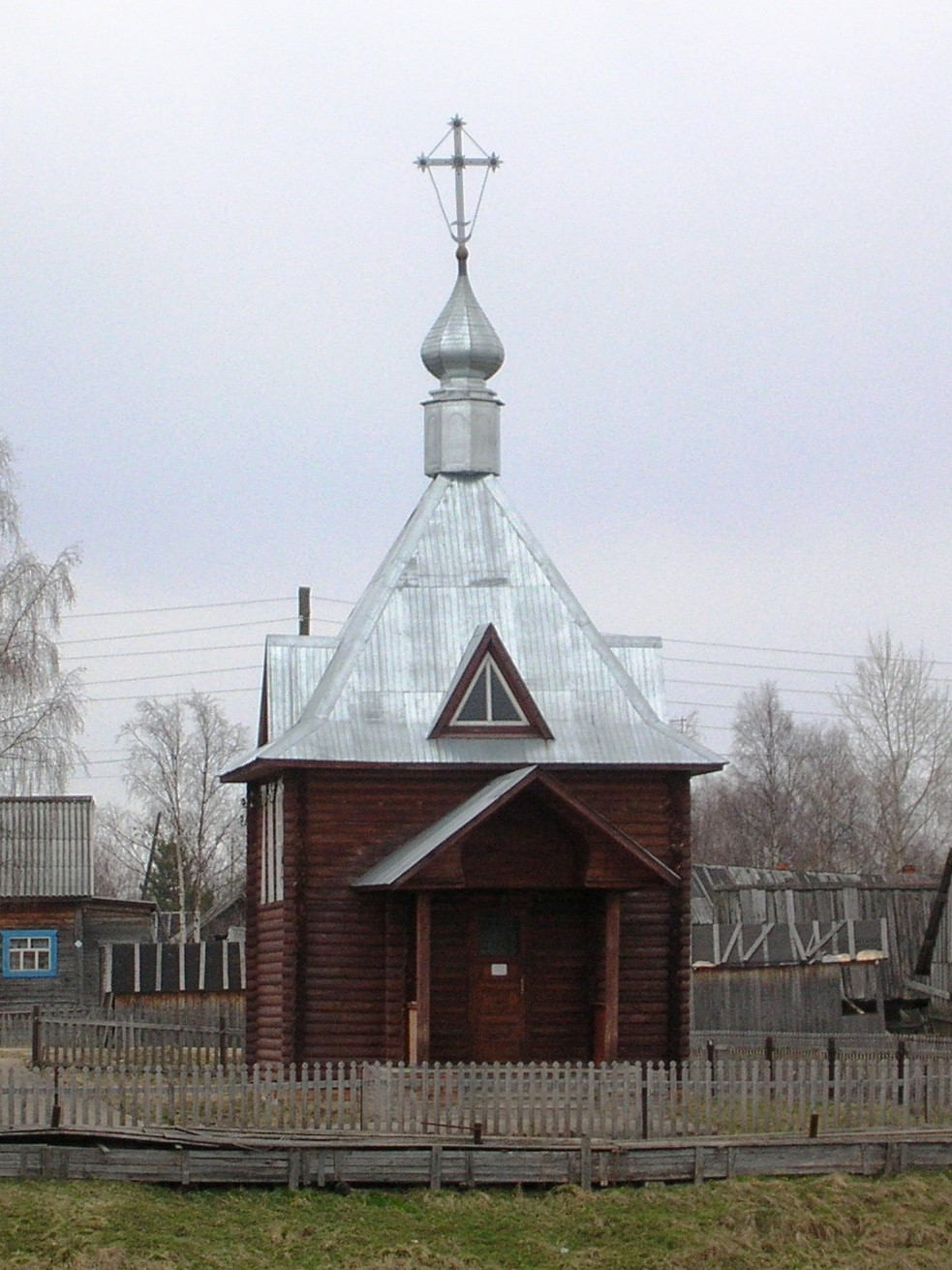
Venerables Gregory and Cassian of Avnezh Chapel, Turovets village, Vologda Oblast

Turovets (Russian: Туровец) is a rural locality (a settlement) and the administrative center Turovetskoye Rural Settlement, Mezhdurechensky District, Vologda Oblast, Russia. The population was 1,027 as of 2002.

== Geography ==
Turovets is located 243 km northeast of Shuyskoye (the district's administrative centre) by road. Uvarovitsa is the nearest rural locality.
