= Khotmyzhsk =

Khotmyzhsk Хотмыжск
- Selo
- Location within Belgorod Oblast Location within Russia
- Coordinates: 50°35′N 35°51′E
- Country: Russia
- Region: Belgorod Oblast
- District: Borisovsky District
- Time zone: UTC+3:00

Khotmyzhsk (Russian: Хотмыжск) is a rural locality (a selo) and the administrative center of Khotmyzhskoye Rural Settlement, Borisovsky District, Belgorod Oblast, Russia. The population was 1,076 as of 2010. There are 26 streets.

== Geography ==
Khotmyzhsk is located 15 km east of Borisovka (the district's administrative centre) by road. Belenkoye is the nearest rural locality.
