= Gazan =

Gazan typically refers to a resident of the Gaza Strip. It may also refer to:

- Gazan, Natanz, a village in Isfahan Province, Iran
- Gazan, Semirom, a village in Isfahan Province, Iran
- Gazan, Kermanshah, a village in Kermanshah Province, Iran
- Gazan-e Olya, a village in Kurdistan Province
- Gazan-e Sofla, a village in Kurdistan Province
- Gazan, Sistan and Baluchestan
- Gazan Ashehi, Sistan and Baluchestan Province
- Gazan, South Khorasan, a village in South Khorasan Province, Iran
- Gazan, alternate name of Darreh-ye Ghazan-e Sofla, a village in South Khorasan Province, Iran
- Gazan Bazin, Hormozgan, a village in Hormozgan Province, Iran
- Jizan, a city in South-Western Saudi Arabia
- Honoré Théodore Maxime Gazan de la Peyrière (1765-1845), a French general during the Napoleonic Wars

== See also ==
- Gaza (disambiguation)
