= Qazan =

Qazan may refer to:

- Qazan, Balkh, Afghanistan
- Qazan, Bamyan, Afghanistan
- Qazan, Iran, a village in West Azerbaijan Province, Iran
- Qazan, Kurdistan, a village in Kurdistan Province, Iran
- Qazan, South Khorasan, a village in South Khorasan Province, Iran
- Iske Qazan, a historical town in Russia
- Qazan Khan ibn Yasaur, ruler of the Chagatai Khanate in 1343 - 1346
- Kazan, sometimes spelt Qazan, a city in Russia

== See also ==
- Gazan (disambiguation)
- Kazan (disambiguation)
