= Aeroflot accidents and incidents in the 1950s =

Following is a list of accidents and incidents Aeroflot experienced in the 1950s. The deadliest event the Soviet Union's flag carrier went through in the decade occurred in October 1958, when a Tupolev Tu-104 crashed en route to Sverdlovsk, then located in the Russian SSR, killing all 80 occupants on board. In terms of fatalities, the accident ranks as the eighth worst accident involving a Tu-104, as of July 2016. Another aircraft of the type was involved in the second deadliest accident the airline experienced in the decade, this time in August 1958, when 64 people were killed when the aircraft crashed near Chita after entering an updraft. The Tu-104's tail was modified and the service ceiling lowered in the wake of these two accidents.

The number of recorded fatalities aboard Aeroflot aircraft during the decade fell to 1050; likewise, 118 of its aircraft were written off in accidents or incidents, split into one Antonov An-10, 12 Antonov An-2s, two Avia 14Ps, 28 Ilyushin Il-12s, 15 Ilyushin Il-14s, one Ilyushin Il-18, 54 Lisunov Li-2s, 3 TS-62s, and 2 Tupolev Tu-104s. Most of the fatal accidents took place within the borders of the Soviet Union.

Certain Western media accounts have speculated that the Soviet government was reluctant publicly to admit the occurrence of such events. The true number of accidents, they suggest, might have been higher, as fatal events would have only been admitted when there were foreigners aboard the crashed aircraft, the accident took place in a foreign country, or they reached the news for some reason. However, since the dissolution of the USSR, no evidence of significant numbers of unreported serious accidents has emerged, in any of its then-constituent republics.

== List ==
Date	Location	Aircraft	Tail number	Airline division	Aircraft damage	Fatalities	Description	Refs
25 January 1950	(Soviet Union) Akmola region	Po-2A	CCCP-А1606	Kazakhstan	W/O	1/1	Crashed after the pilot became disorientated in whiteout conditions.	
9 March 1950	(Soviet Union) Balyktyul, Ulagansky District	Po-2S	CCCP-К1115	West Siberia	W/O	2/3	Lost speed, struck trees and crashed while turning in a mountainous area.	
7 April 1950	(Soviet Union) Kiev	Li-2	CCCP-Л4411	Ukraine	W/O	0/5	Force-landed due to fuel exhaustion following repeated attempts to land at Zhuliany Airport in bad weather. The aircraft was completing a Kharkiv–Kiev passenger service.	
17 April 1950	(Soviet Union) Vitim	TS-62	CCCP-Л862	East Siberia	W/O	10/20	Five minutes into the flight, the left engine began to run rough, and later caught fire. The fire spread into the fuselage through the heating system. At 2,000 m (6,600 ft) the burning engine fell off, but the aircraft continued to lose altitude. At 300–400 metres (980–1,310 ft), the crew were able to pull out of the dive and make a forced landing 29 km (18 mi) southwest of Vitim. Two minutes after landing, a fuel tank exploded and the aircraft burned out. The aircraft was operating an Irkutsk-Olekminsk-Kirensk-Yakutsk passenger service as Flight 543.	
23 May 1950	(Soviet Union) Kushchevsky District	AP	CCCP-А2562	North Caucasus	W/O	1/1	The aircraft was conducting alfalfa processing flights of the fifth section of the "Kushchevsky" grain state farm when it crashed in a right turn while flying too slow due to pilot error.	
25 June 1950	(Soviet Union) Kishinev	Po-2A	CCCP-А1777	Moldavian OAO	W/O	1/1	During an unauthorized flight, the pilot, who was drunk, performed stunts. While in a nosedive, the aircraft crashed on the roof of an apartment building.	
19 July 1950	(Soviet Union) Tbilisi Airport	Il-12P	CCCP-Л1340	Georgia	W/O	4/11	The aircraft was operating a training flight; along with the five crew were six unauthorized passengers. The pilot deviated from both the approach pattern and glide scope and the aircraft hit the top of a 175 m (574 ft) hill that was not on the map.	
30 July 1950	(Soviet Union) Karaganda	Il-12P	CCCP-Л1803	Kazakhstan	W/O	25/25	Crashed on approach to Karaganda Airport. Six minutes after takeoff from Karaganda the crew radioed that the number one engine had failed and that they were returning to the airport. While maneuvering to return to the airport, the crew had to change course due to a tall building in the area and overshot the center of the runway. The crew attempted to turn for the final approach, but the aircraft lost speed when the pilot turned left (towards the failed engine) while lowering the landing gear at the same time. Control was lost and the aircraft spiraled down from an altitude of some 50–70 m (160–230 ft) and crashed. The aircraft was operating a domestic scheduled Alma-Ata–Moscow service with several stops. The day before at Alma-Ata the aircraft suffered unexplained problems with the number one engine during a test flight, but the crew did not report the problem.	
11 August 1950	(Soviet Union) Sverdlovsk	Il-12P	CCCP-Л1706	1st Moscow Air Group	W/O	2/27	Struck a tree and crashed while on approach to Sverdlovsk in fog while flying too low. The aircraft was operating a Khabarovsk–Omsk–Sverdlovsk–Moscow passenger service as Flight 8.	
9 November 1950	(Soviet Union) Turukhansk	TS-62	CCCP-Л1098	Krasnoyarsk	W/O	2/12	While en route to Dudinka, the crew flew into poor weather. Unable to locate Dudinka, the crew decided to return to Turukhansk. On the way back ice formed on the wings. When the landing gear was lowered, the aircraft lost speed and altitude, after which it stalled and crashed in open woodland 2 km (1.2 mi) northeast of Turukhansk Airport. The aircraft was operating a domestic scheduled Krasnoyarsk-Turukhansk-Dudinka passenger service.	
27 December 1950	(Soviet Union) Mynzhilki	Li-2	CCCP-Л4003	Uzbekistan	W/O	8/8	The aircraft was operating an aerial photography training flight. After a stop at Dzhusaly the aircraft then flew for Turkestan, although the crew were unaware that strong winds had pushed the aircraft off course by 72 km (45 mi). The aircraft then crashed into Mount Mynzhilgi in the Karatau range at 2,050 m (6,730 ft), 126 m (413 ft) from the top.	
9 January 1951	(Soviet Union) Black Sea off Tuapse	Il-12P	CCCP-Л1811	1st OAS	W/O	8/8	The aircraft was completing a domestic scheduled Moscow-Krasnodar-Sochi passenger service. While descending over the Black Sea for Sochi, the aircraft was struck by lightning at 900 m (3,000 ft). The left rear fuel tank exploded, starting a fire. The crew lost control and the aircraft crashed in the Black Sea.	
9 January 1951	(Soviet Union) Kazan	Li-2	CCCP-Л4359	West Siberia	W/O	6/6	While descending to Kazan, the aircraft encountered icing conditions and clouds. The cockpit windows iced over. While on approach the right wing struck the top of a radio tower at 130 m (430 ft), breaking off a portion of the wing. The aircraft continued to fly for 220–250 m (720–820 ft) until it crashed in a field.	
28 January 1951	(Soviet Union) Narimanovka Airport	Li-2	CCCP-Л4715	Kazakhstan	W/O	0/2	The aircraft was operating an Alma-Ata–Moscow service with in-route stops. During a night time approach to Kostanay, the crew encountered dense haze and attempted to land despite having no visual contact with the ground. The pilot mistook the ceiling of the haze with snowy terrain and leveled out at 30 m (98 ft), causing a loss of airspeed. The aircraft stalled and crashed.	
9 February 1951	(Soviet Union) Tashkent Airport	Li-2	CCCP-Л4821	Uzbekistan	W/O	0/4	At the start of a training flight, the aircraft took off with frozen soil on the leading edge of the horizontal stabilizer. The aircraft pitched up, lost airspeed, and crashed from a height of 20 m (66 ft).	
13 March 1951	(Soviet Union) Sverdlovsk	Il-12P	CCCP-Л1319	West Siberia	W/O	0	While approaching Sverdlovsk the aircraft encountered icing conditions and the cockpit windows iced over. During landing the crew did not monitor instruments and later lowered the landing gear. After the engines were throttled back the aircraft suddenly lost altitude and crashed 2 km (1.2 mi) short of the runway. The aircraft was completing the second leg of a Moscow–Kazan–Sverdlovsk–Novosibirsk passenger service.	
25 March 1951	(Soviet Union) Iskra	Li-2	CCCP-Л4790	East Siberia	W/O	12/13	Shortly after takeoff from Irkutsk at night the crew encountered low clouds, poor weather, heavy turbulence and icing conditions. The aircraft was flying low and drifted off course. The crew accidentally feathered the number two propeller, causing a loss of altitude. The aircraft descended until it struck trees and lost control, stalling and crashing upside down on a slope of a wooded hill. The sole survivor, although seriously injured, was found ten days later. The aircraft was operating a domestic scheduled Irkutsk-Chita-Yakutsk passenger service as Flight 451. Investigation revealed that the captain was drunk and the co-pilot was licensed to fly a Po-2, not an Li-2.	
28 March 1951	(Soviet Union) Spilve Airport	Li-2	CCCP-Л4198	Latvia	W/O	0	The aircraft was performing a training flight, despite poor weather. Visibility dropped quickly while the aircraft was landing in rain and the aircraft performed a premature descent while flying too low. The aircraft struck a river bank and crashed.	
29 March 1951	(Soviet Union) Moscow	Il-12P	CCCP-Л1313	1st OAS	W/O	3/8	After repairs at the ARB-400 facility at Vnukovo Airport, the aircraft departed to perform a test flight, despite poor visibility. The crew lost spatial orientation due to a malfunctioning compass. ATC advised the crew to make a belly landing, but the crew insisted on landing at Vnukovo. The crew located the airport, still in poor visibility, and began an approach, but performed a go-around after the aircraft was too far to the left of the runway. The aircraft was then diverted to an airport northwest of Moscow, but the crew was unable to locate it and returned to Vnukovo, where the crew made another approach, but in the process the right propeller struck the top of a radio tower. The aircraft entered a descending right turn, struck trees and crashed.	
8 April 1951	(Soviet Union) Mama	Li-2T	CCCP-Л4467	East Siberia	W/O	8/8	The aircraft was operating a Kirensk-Ust-Kut-Mama-Kirensk cargo service. During a second flight to Mama the crew diverted to Bodaybo due to poor weather. The crew received permission to land at Mama but communication was lost afterwards. The aircraft crashed in a forest 18 km (11 mi) from the airport on the bank of the Vitim River with the tail hanging over the frozen river.	
19 April 1951	(Soviet Union) Chukotka Autonomous Okrug	Po-2L	CCCP-Л1697	Far East	W/O	1/1	Crashed after the pilot became disorientated in whiteout conditions.	
21 April 1951	(Soviet Union) Yermakovsky District	An-2T	CCCP-А2597	Krasnoyarsk	W/O	4/4	Disappeared while operating a Kyzyl-Abakan cargo service. The aircraft took off from Kyzyl despite bad weather on the flight path. The wreckage was located in August 2009 on the side of a mountain in the Ermakovsky District, Krasnoyarsk Region, but was not positively identified until 9 June 2019.	
20 May 1951	(Soviet Union) Oloneshti	Po-2L	CCCP-Л1143	Moldavian OAO	W/O	2/2	Crashed following an unexplained loss of control.	
25 May 1951	(Soviet Union) Chat	Po-2L	CCCP-К1457	Turkmen	W/O	3/3	While on a second approach to the landing site, the aircraft entered a tailspin following a loss of speed while turning.	
3 June 1951	(Soviet Union) Naumiestistsky District	Po-2A	CCCP-А2039	Lithuanian OAO	W/O	2/2	The pilot, who was drunk, performed stunts. Speed was lost and the aircraft entered a tailspin and crashed.	
9 July 1951	(Soviet Union) Onega	Po-2L	CCCP-Х481	Northern	W/O	1/1	During an unauthorized flight, the aircraft clipped a telegraph pole and crashed. The pilot was severely intoxicated.	
17 July 1951	(Soviet Union) Yarikta	Po-2	CCCP-Ш1947	East Siberian	W/O	2/2	Crashed after the pilot, who was drunk, banked right to avoid a house and some trees while flying low.	
12 August 1951	(Soviet Union) Vilyuysk	Li-2	CCCP-Л4314	Yakut	W/O	2/16	The aircraft was operating a Yakutsk-Vilyuysk-Nyurba service. Just after takeoff the left propeller feathered. The crew increased right engine power and prepared to go-around. While making a turn to go-around, the right engine overheated. The crew reduced engine power and began circling. The crew then attempted another go-around, but the right engine failed, causing a loss of speed and altitude. While making a left turn, the aircraft began to bank to the left and hit the ground, destroying the cockpit and splitting the fuselage in two. The left wing also separated.	
23 August 1951	(Soviet Union) Kanash	Li-2	CCCP-Л1271	Moscow	W/O	0	Force-landed 120 km (75 mi) southwest of Kazan Airport due to fuel exhaustion after the crew became disorientated.	
7 September 1951	(Soviet Union) Gorbovichi	An-2T	CCCP-А2583	2nd OUAE	W/O	5/5	Broke apart in mid-air and crashed during a training flight due to both a design fault and a manufacturing defect.	
1 October 1951	(Soviet Union) Krasnoyarsk Territory	Li-2	CCCP-Л4775	Krasnoyarsk	W/O	6/15	Crashed in a forest. The aircraft was flying at 50–200 m (160–660 ft), depending on cloud height; the aircraft flew into cloud several times. After passing the Kureyka River the aircraft descended to 50–70 m (160–230 ft). While flying up a hill slope the propellers and wings began striking tree tops. The pilot took the controls to avoid a head-on collision with the hill, but the left side of the tail struck trees, breaking off the elevator and stabilizer. After a 180 degree turn speed was lost and the aircraft crashed. The aircraft was operating a Krasnoyarsk-Turukhansk-Nadezhda passenger service as Flight 33.	
11 October 1951	(Soviet Union) Bogdanovich	Li-2	CCCP-Л4416	Ural	W/O	1/10	Crashed in a swampy area 70 kilometres (43 mi) from Koltsovo Airport due to crew disorientation and resulting fuel exhaustion. The aircraft was operating a Sochi-Kazan-Sverdlovsk passenger service as Flight 521.	
30 October 1951	(Soviet Union) Arkangelsk	Li-2	CCCP-Л4393	Northern	W/O	0	Both engines failed while on approach to Arkangelsk after the flight engineer made a mistake in handling the fuel system. The aircraft force-landed in the Severnaya Dvina River some 10 m (33 ft) from the banks and partially sank.	
14 November 1951	(Soviet Union) Nikolayevsk-on-Amur	Il-12P	CCCP-Л1360	Yakut	W/O	0/19	The aircraft took off with snow on the fuselage, accumulated during taxiing and engine tests, after which it lifted off too late and too slow, causing the aircraft to vibrate. Assuming the vibration to be a rough-running engine, the flight engineer overfueled the left engine, and it lost power. Altitude was lost and the aircraft crashed, broke up, and caught fire. The aircraft was beginning the second leg of a domestic scheduled Khabarovsk–Nikolayevsk-na-Amure–Seymchan–Magadan passenger service.	
17 November 1951	(Soviet Union) Novosibirsk	Il-12P	CCCP-Л1775	1st OAS	W/O	23/23	Crashed shortly after takeoff due to wing icing. Due to operate a domestic non-scheduled Novosibirsk-Omsk-Moscow passenger service.	
30 November 1951	(Soviet Union) Kiev	Li-2	Unknown	Belarus	W/O	0	En route to Kiev the right engine lost oil due to a leaking oil cooler. The propeller could not be feathered and the aircraft force-landed in a forest clearing 50 km (31 mi) east of Kiev. The aircraft was operating a domestic scheduled Kharkov–Kiev passenger service.	
27 December 1951	(Soviet Union) Namtsev	Li-2	CCCP-Л4228	Yakut	W/O	20/20	The aircraft was operating a domestic scheduled Yakutsk–Vilyuysk passenger service when it force-landed 90 kilometres (56 mi) out of Yakutsk due to double engine failure caused by fuel exhaustion. The aircraft collided with trees and was destroyed by fire.	
9 January 1952	(Soviet Union) Stalingrad	Li-2	CCCP-Л4315	Azerbaijan	W/O	3/4	While on approach to Stalingrad, the aircraft lost altitude, stalled and crashed into a snowy field some 60 m (200 ft) to the right of the runway, breaking in two. The aircraft was completing the Voronezh–Stalingrad leg of a Moscow–Voronezh–Stalingrad–Baku cargo service as Flight 203.	
21 February 1952	(Soviet Union) Baratayevka Airport	Il-12	CCCP-Л1849	Advanced Flying Training College	Repaired	1/18	The aircraft took off with the center of gravity too far forward. Due to pilot error, the aircraft lost altitude. The pilot attempted to regain altitude, but the propellers had struck the ground. The aircraft then touched down again, both propellers hitting the ground a second time. A blade from the left propeller then broke off and punctured the fuselage, killing a passenger and seriously injuring a second. The aircraft was repaired and returned to service as a cargo freighter and continued flying until 1964.	
26 March 1952	(Soviet Union) Tula Airport	Unknown	Unknown	Unknown	W/O	70	A passenger aircraft, reportedly with 36 on board, overran the runway on landing at Tula Airport, colliding with a military transport aircraft carrying 34 people. Both aircraft caught fire. Given the death toll, the aircraft involved were probably Li-2 or Il-12. The passenger aircraft was operating an Odessa–Tula–Moscow service while the military aircraft was preparing for a flight to Berlin.	
5 April 1952	(Soviet Union) Magdagachi	Il-12P	CCCP-Л1308	East Siberia	W/O	6/6	Crashed shortly after takeoff. After lifting off, the aircraft climbed to 30–40 m (98–131 ft) but then began banking to the right. Control was lost and the aircraft crashed 922 m (3,025 ft) to the right of the runway and 600 m (2,000 ft) past the runway. The cause of the crash was not determined, but a locked left aileron was blamed. The aircraft was operating an Irkutsk–Chita–Magdagachi–Khabarovsk cargo service as Flight 5.	
3 May 1952	(Soviet Union) Khandyga	Li-2	CCCP-Л4602	Yakut	W/O	4/4	The aircraft was operating a Yakutsk-Khandyga-Allaikha cargo service. The aircraft encountered bad weather and deviated from the route due to strong winds. It entered clouds and struck a mountain at 1,200 m (3,900 ft) in the Verkhoyanski mountain range.	
19 July 1952	(Soviet Union) Spilve Airport	Li-2	CCCP-Л4197	Latvia	W/O	4/4	Crashed during a training flight following double engine failure, probably due to mismanagement of the fuel system. While performing a go-around both engines quit, causing a loss of speed. The aircraft stalled while in a left turn and crashed near the airport.	
23 August 1952	(Soviet Union) Chlya	Il-12	CCCP-Л1488	Far East	Repaired	1/16	Seventy minutes after takeoff, the crew heard a loud clap sound and felt a vibration. A portion of a propeller blade on the right engine had broken off and punctured the fuselage, destroying hydraulic lines, engine control cables and electrical wires. The blade then struck the legs of the flight mechanic (who later died) and then embedded itself in the upper wing of a Po-2 (CCCP-T743) that the aircraft was transporting. The engine developed vibrations but could not be shut down nor could the propeller be feathered. Altitude was lost and a wheels-up forced landing was made. The aircraft, operating a Khabarovsk–Nikolaevsk-on-Amur–Okhotsk–Magadan passenger service was repaired and continued flying until 1963.	
28 September 1952	(Soviet Union) Belogorsk	Li-2	CCCP-Л4673	Far East	W/O	7/7	Disappeared while being ferried from Khabarovsk to Tashkent for repairs, with stops at Krasnoyarsk and Novosibirsk. The aircraft was accidentally discovered in 1967 on a mountain 158 km (98 mi) from Kemerovo. While on the Krasnoyarsk-Novosibirsk leg the aircraft encountered severe icing conditions and turbulence. The crew decided to make a forced landing but the aircraft struck trees and crashed.	
5 October 1952	(Soviet Union) Skvoritsy	Il-12P	CCCP-Л1328	Northern	W/O	31/31	Both aircraft were involved in a mid-air collision. The Il-12 was operating a domestic scheduled Minsk-1 Airport–Shosseynaya Airport passenger service as Flight 376 with 24 occupants on board, and had initiated the descent to the destination airport. The TS-62 had departed the same airport bound for Minsk as Flight 381, with three passengers and a crew of four aboard. All occupants on both aircraft perished in the accident. Collision attributed to ATC errors.	
5 October 1952	(Soviet Union) Skvoritsy	TS-62	CCCP-Л1055	Northern	W/O	31/31	Both aircraft were involved in a mid-air collision. The Il-12 was operating a domestic scheduled Minsk-1 Airport–Shosseynaya Airport passenger service as Flight 376 with 24 occupants on board, and had initiated the descent to the destination airport. The TS-62 had departed the same airport bound for Minsk as Flight 381, with three passengers and a crew of four aboard. All occupants on both aircraft perished in the accident. Collision attributed to ATC errors.	
22 October 1952	(Soviet Union) Kuibyshev Airport	Li-2	CCCP-Л4875	Central	W/O	0/12	During the approach to Kuibyshev (now Samara), the aircraft descended below the glide scope, collided with a high-voltage power line between the outer marker and inner marker and crashed. The aircraft was operating a domestic scheduled Moscow-Kazan-Kuibyshev-Sverdlovsk (now Yekaterinburg) passenger service.	
4 December 1952	(Soviet Union) Yeniseisk	Li-2T	CCCP-Л4661	Krasnoyarsk	W/O	3/19	While climbing through 1,800 m (5,900 ft), the crew decided to return to the airport due to a problem with the left propeller. The propeller could not be feathered and the aircraft lost altitude. The engine was shut down, but the propeller continued to windmill in the airstream. The aircraft continued to lose altitude until it struck trees and crashed, breaking the fuselage in three. Investigation concluded that the left propeller had oversped due to improper maintenance. The aircraft was operating a domestic scheduled Dudinka-Yeniseisk-Krasnoyarsk passenger service as Flight 688.	
15 December 1952	(Soviet Union) Koltsovo Airport	Li-2	CCCP-Л4551	Ural	W/O	0/6	During a training flight, the aircraft attempted to land in poor weather with low clouds and ground fog after dusk. The right wing struck a telephone pole, crashed near the fuel depot 300 m (980 ft) further, caught fire and burned out.	
21 January 1953	(Soviet Union) Irkutsk	Li-2	CCCP-Л4666	East Siberia	W/O	0/5	Both engines failed five minutes into a test flight. The crew attempted a forced landing in the outskirts of Irkutsk, but the aircraft crashed into a house.	
23 January 1953	(Soviet Union) near Kazan Airport	Il-12P	CCCP-Л1435	West Siberia	W/O	11/11	Both aircraft were involved in a mid-air collision. The Il-12 was operating a Kazan-Moscow-Novosibirsk cargo service as Flight 22 and had just taken off from Kazan when it collided with the Li-2, which was on approach to Kazan from Moscow. The Li-2 lost its left engine in the collision, while the Il-12's tail was sheared off.	
23 January 1953	(Soviet Union) near Kazan Airport	Li-2	CCCP-Л4582	Northern	W/O	11/11	Both aircraft were involved in a mid-air collision. The Il-12 was operating a Kazan-Moscow-Novosibirsk cargo service as Flight 22 and had just taken off from Kazan when it collided with the Li-2, which was on approach to Kazan from Moscow. The Li-2 lost its left engine in the collision, while the Il-12's tail was sheared off.	
9 February 1953	(Soviet Union) Kirensk Airfield	Li-2	CCCP-Л4513	East Siberia	W/O	0	During takeoff, the right engine failed at 20–30 m (66–98 ft). The crew attempted to make a forced landing on the airfield grounds, but the aircraft crashed.	
4 March 1953	(Soviet Union) Ashgabat Airport	Li-2	CCCP-Л4371	Turkmenistan	W/O	0	The aircraft overran the runway and struck an earth wall after failing to reach takeoff speed.	
30 April 1953	(Soviet Union) near Kazan Airport	Il-12P	CCCP-Л1777	Moscow	W/O	1/23	Ditched in the Volga River due to double engine failure. During the approach to Kazan the aircraft suffered bird strikes, one of which hit the windshield near an area where the magneto switches for the engines were located. A short circuit occurred in the switch wires after the impact, causing the engines to quit. The propellers could not be feathered due to a loss of electrical power. The aircraft was completing a domestic scheduled Moscow–Kazan passenger service as Flight 35.	
24 May 1953	(Soviet Union) Nadezhda Airport	Li-2	CCCP-Л4863	Krasnoyarsk	W/O	0	The aircraft failed to take off, overrunning the runway and crashing into a dirt pile, damaging the landing gear. The crew could not decide who was to fly the aircraft.	
27 May 1953	(Soviet Union) Barzas	Li-2T	CCCP-А4031	East Siberia	W/O	27/27	Both aircraft were involved in a mid-air collision. The Li-2 had deviated 47 km (29 mi) from the flight route and collided with the Li-2T. The Li-2T's right propeller cut into the Li-2's fuselage, breaking off the aileron and flap. The Li-2's tail and left wing separated and the aircraft broke up and crashed. The Li-2T lost control and crashed 350 m (1,150 ft) from the Li-2T; although the fuel tanks ruptured on impact, there was no fire. CCCP-L4534 was operating an Irkutsk-Krasnoyarsk-Novosibirsk passenger service as Flight 18; CCCP-A4031 was operating an aerial photography flight.	
27 May 1953	(Soviet Union) Barzas	Li-2	CCCP-Л4534	East Siberia	W/O	27/27		
14 June 1953	(Soviet Union) Zugdidi	Il-12P	CCCP-Л1375	Georgia	W/O	18/18	While en route to Tbilisi, the aircraft entered a thunderstorm and was struck by lightning. This caused an uncontrolled dive. The crew attempted a recovery manoeuver at 300 m (980 ft) but this placed excessive load on the aircraft, causing the outer wing sections to separate. The aircraft crashed nose-down on a wooded hillside and was destroyed by fire. The aircraft was operating a domestic Moscow-Rostov on Don-Tbilisi scheduled passenger service as Flight 229.	
1 July 1953	(Soviet Union) Koryaki	An-2	CCCP-А2638	Far East	W/O	11/11	The aircraft was operating a Milkovo–Petropavlovsk-Kamchatsky passenger service, flying under VFR at 1,200–1,300 m (3,900–4,300 ft). An hour into the flight, weather conditions deteriorated with low clouds and rain when the aircraft struck the side of a mountain some 18 km (11 mi) northwest of Koryaki. Wreckage was found three days later. The crew failed to adhere to procedures while flying VFR in bad weather.	
6 July 1953	(Soviet Union) Rushan	Li-2	CCCP-Л4027	Tajikistan	W/O	7/7	Crashed in a mountain pass after encountering a downdraft while flying too low. The crew deviated from the flight route when the mountain pass the aircraft was to fly through became shrouded in cloud. The aircraft was operating a domestic scheduled Khorog-Stalinabad passenger service as Flight 878.	
13 August 1953	(Soviet Union) Bykovo Airport	Li-2	CCCP-Л4393	Moscow	W/O	0/0	Struck by a TS-62 (CCCP-Л1034) that had landed 170 m (560 ft) to the right of the runway due to fog. The collision damaged the tail of the Li-2 and the right wing of the TS-62; the Li-2 was written off.	
22 August 1953	(Soviet Union) Bykovo Airport	Li-2	CCCP-Л4157	Moscow	W/O	0/1	The aircraft was parked in preparation for a flight to Krasnoyarsk. Early in the morning an engine mechanic entered the aircraft and started the engines. Although he was able to take off, the aircraft assumed a nose-high attitude, stalled and crashed from 5–10 m (16–33 ft).	
26 September 1953	(Soviet Union) Bagdarin	An-2	CCCP-Л231	East Siberia	W/O	3/10	The aircraft was beginning a Bagdarin-Romanovka passenger service. For unknown reasons, the crew were in a hurry to get to Romanovka, and after passengers boarded, the engine was started and the aircraft taxied to the runway and began takeoff. But at 1 m (3.3 ft) the aircraft banked left and crashed. The crew was in such a hurry that they failed to follow the pre-departure checklist and started the engine and taxi procedure without checking the aircraft. The loss of control was due to a chock on the ailerons that the crew had missed and failed to remove.	
14 October 1953	(Soviet Union) Irkutsk	Il-12P	CCCP-Л1727	East Siberia	W/O	4/28	Shortly after takeoff from Irkutsk, the pilot mistook the lights on the inner marker masts for an aircraft approaching head on. The pilot banked sharply to the right at low altitude to avoid a collision, but the aircraft stalled and crashed 2.5 km (1.6 mi) short of the runway and 500 m (1,600 ft) to the right of the runway. The aircraft was operating a domestic scheduled Moscow–Irkutsk–Chita–Yuzhno-Sakhalinsk service as Flight 9.	
21 October 1953	(Soviet Union) Mineralnye Vody	Li-2	CCCP-Л4890	West Siberia	W/O	1/8	Eighty-seven minutes after takeoff from Stalingrad at 2,100 m (6,900 ft) the aircraft flew into snow. The crew were unable to set up the direction finder for their destination due to radio interference. Without ATC permission the crew decided to return to Stalingrad and climbed to 3,000 m (9,800 ft). Once above the clouds the crew set up the direction finder and turned back around and descended to 2,700 m (8,900 ft), despite being allowed to only operate 600 meters lower. Later the aircraft encountered icing and light snow and the radio compass began to malfunction. The crew unilaterally descended to 1,500 m (4,900 ft). The crew then descended to 300 m (980 ft) without ATC permission. The aircraft descended even lower, later striking stone structures and crashing in a field. The aircraft was operating a domestic scheduled Sverdlovsk-Stalingrad-Mineralye Vody passenger service as Flight 525.	
27 October 1953	(Soviet Union) Magadan	Il-12P	CCCP-Л1765	Far East	W/O	22/27	Crashed two minutes after takeoff from Magadan Airport. The wings had not been de-iced before takeoff, and the overloaded aircraft lost speed on climbout, banking to the left and then to the right, eventually crashing 6 km (3.7 mi) from the airport. Due to operate a domestic scheduled Magadan-Okhotsk-Khabarovsk passenger service as Flight 783.	
31 October 1953	(Soviet Union) near Kharkov Airport	Li-2	CCCP-Л4732	North Caucasus	W/O	15/16	Crashed on approach to Kharkov. The pilot came in too low and lost speed in a right turn and struck the ground and crashed in a residential garden between two houses in a village near the airport; the surviving passenger was seriously injured. The crew had previously practiced instrument flying training on passenger flights and was performing the approach with the cockpit curtains closed. The aircraft was operating a Rostov-on-Don–Kharkiv–Moscow passenger service as Flight 270.	
4 November 1953	(Soviet Union) near Magdagachi Airport	Il-12P	CCCP-Л1367	East Siberia	W/O	5/5	Struck trees and crashed while on approach to Magdagachi Airport. The left altimeter was set incorrectly and it showed an altitude of 55 m (180 ft) greater than the actual altitude. While on final approach the aircraft struck trees 5,620 m (3.49 mi) from the airport, causing the left wing to separate. The aircraft crashed upside down 358 m (1,175 ft) after striking trees and burned out. The aircraft was operating an Irkutsk–Chita–Magdagachi–Khabarovsk cargo service as Flight 5.	
8 January 1954	(Soviet Union) Ülemiste Airport	Li-2	Unknown	Estonia	Unknown	1	While operating a domestic scheduled Tallinn–Leningrad passenger service as Flight 365, the aircraft was hijacked by a man wearing a Soviet Air Force uniform and a woman and demanded to be flown to Finland. Both were armed with firearms and the woman was also armed with a knife. The flight engineer attempted to overpower the hijackers but was shot (he died the next day). Other crew members did ultimately succeed in overpowering the hijackers and the aircraft turned around and returned to Tallinn. The flight engineer was awarded the Hero of the Soviet Union (posthumous), the pilot was awarded the Order of the Red Banner and the remaining crew the Order of the Red Star.	
27 January 1954	(Soviet Union) Tsaghkashen	Li-2	CCCP-Л4105	Armenia	W/O	6/6	Struck a mountain. The aircraft, operating an atmospheric sounding flight, was blown 18 km (11 mi) off course by strong winds. While descending in cloud the aircraft struck the eastern slope of Mount Kara-Dag.	
26 August 1954	(Soviet Union) Yuzhno-Sakhalinsk	Li-2	CCCP-Л4679	Far East	W/O	26/27	Struck trees on a hill and crashed upside-down while descending for Yuzhno-Sakhalinsk. The crew had mistakenly tuned the radio compass to the frequency of a nearby military airfield instead of the destination airport and this caused a navigation error. The aircraft was operating a Khabarovsk–Yuzhno-Sakhalinsk passenger service as Flight 971.	
27 September 1954	(Soviet Union) Novosibirsk	Il-12P	CCCP-Л1365	West Siberia	W/O	29/29	Struck trees and crashed while attempting to land in poor visibility after the crew deviated from the flight route. The aircraft was operating a domestic scheduled Yuzhno-Sakhalinsk–Novosibirsk–Moscow passenger service as Flight 10. This crash is the deadliest involving the Il-12.	
28 October 1954	(Soviet Union) Mount Sivukha	Il-12P	CCCP-Л1789	Moscow	W/O	19/19 (Note: Some sources indicate 20 deaths, as the co-pilot was not listed in the crew's names.)	Flew into the side of a mountain. The aircraft was operating a domestic scheduled Irkutsk-Krasnoyarsk-Moscow passenger service as Flight 136. Wreckage found in June 1955.	
12 November 1954	(Soviet Union) Koltsovo Airport	Li-2	CCCP-Л4519	Northern	W/O	6/15	Crashed on takeoff. The aircraft took off with 25 degrees of flaps; after becoming airborne the aircraft banked left and then right, crashing to the left of and near the end of the runway and breaking up. Crew fatigue was blamed. The aircraft was operating a Leningrad–Moscow–Kazan–Sverdlovsk–Omsk–Novosibirsk charter service.	
5 December 1954	(Soviet Union) Alma-Ata	Il-12P	CCCP-Л1320	Kazakhstan	W/O	1/19	Shortly after takeoff from Alma-Ata, the left engine developed problems. The aircraft climbed to 100 m (328 ft) before losing altitude and speed. The pilot then decided to make an emergency landing at a military airfield at Pervomaysky (4.5 km (2.8 mi) northwest of Alma-Ata), but the aircraft struck a building, several trees and two telephone poles after which it crash-landed wheels up and struck another building. The air self-start valve on cylinder 10 of engine number one had burned out; the crew mistook it for an engine fire and shut down the engine. The aircraft was beginning an Alma-Ata–Karaganda–Moscow passenger service as Flight 98.	
31 December 1954	(Soviet Union) Irkutsk	Il-14	Unknown	Unknown	W/O	17/17	The aircraft, probably an Ilyushin Il-14, crashed on takeoff while operating a Beijing-Cyprus passenger service.	
13 January 1955	(Soviet Union) Moscow Region	Li-2	CCCP-Л5000	Moscow	W/O	5/5	Just after takeoff from Bykovo Airport the right engine failed due to a foreign object that had been deliberately placed into the fuel system. The crew increased power to the left engine, but the aircraft entered a right bank and began to lose altitude. The aircraft struck trees and crashed into an unoccupied house. The aircraft was operating a Moscow-Gorky (now Nizhny Novgorod)-Sverdlovsk cargo service as Flight 31.	
23 January 1955	(Soviet Union) Lipovets	Li-2T	CCCP-Л4510	Ukraine	W/O	3/13	Twenty-three minutes after takeoff from Kiev, the passengers smelled a burning odor and noticed a dark stain above a window. A crewmember's cigarette had been thrown out the right window into the cabin intake, starting a fire in the ventilation system. The fire spread quickly, due to the non-impregnated cotton insulation. The fire could not be extinguished and following an emergency descent, the aircraft belly landed in flames in a field, slid for 1,000–1,200 m (3,300–3,900 ft) before it came to rest on the frozen Rosava River and burned out. The aircraft was operating a domestic scheduled Kiev-Nikolaev-Simferpol passenger service as Flight 613. The aircraft had been converted to a passenger-cargo (combi) aircraft at ARB-411 in January 1955 and had deviated from the standard at ARB-402, such as an improperly placed cabin intake and non-fireproof cabin insulation. Several Li-2s converted at ARB-411 had the same construction flaws as CCCP-Л4510 and management at ARB-411 was blamed.	
8 May 1955	(Soviet Union) Dnepropetrovsk	Li-2	CCCP-Л4098	Ukraine	W/O	4/4	While on approach to Dnepropetrovsk, the left outer wing separated. The aircraft entered a spin at 200–300 m (660–980 ft) and crashed on a hillside. The aircraft was operating a Kiev-Dnepropetrovsk (now Dnipro)-Zaporozhye cargo service as Flight 599. During an overhaul in October 1954 at ARB-411, several mistakes were made that ultimately weakened the wing.	
16 May 1955	(Soviet Union) Chelyabinsk	An-2	CCCP-Л5579	West Siberia	W/O	8/8	The aircraft arrived at the "Podovinnoe" kolkhoz on 12 May to spray crops. That evening, the crew drank vodka and red wine. There were no flights on 13 May due to bad weather. On 14 and 15 May, the crew completed 30 rotations each day for a total of 12 hours of flight. On the evening of 15 May, the crew went to a local hostel and drank again. On the morning of 16 May, the crew ate breakfast with more vodka and red wine. The crew later arrived at the aircraft with four passengers. A local keeper attempted but failed to stop the now-drunk crew from taking off. The aircraft climbed to 60 m (200 ft) and flew for two to three minutes before entering a dive and crashing in a field.	
1 July 1955	(Soviet Union) Ukhta	An-2	CCCP-Л2642	Northern	W/O	0/10	Twelve minutes after takeoff the engine lost power at 300 m (980 ft). Altitude was lost and the crew attempted a forced landing in swampy terrain. The aircraft did not make it that far and crashed 1.2 km (0.75 mi) from the Pechora rail line near Tobys railway station (50 km (31 mi) southwest of Ukhta). The aircraft was operating a domestic scheduled Ukhta–Syktyvkar passenger service.	
24 July 1955	(Soviet Union) Birobidzhan	An-2	CCCP-А2616	Far East	W/O	4/4	The aircraft left Birobidzhan on a short cargo flight to a remote area. After takeoff the aircraft climbed to 15–20 m (49–66 ft), performed a 180° turn and continued for 20 km (12 mi). At 600 m (2,000 ft) the aircraft struck trees and crashed. Both pilots were drunk and the aircraft was slightly overloaded.	
6 August 1955	(Soviet Union) Voronezh	Il-14P	CCCP-Л5057	Moscow	W/O	25/25	The aircraft was operating a domestic scheduled Moscow–Stalingrad–Moscow passenger service as Flight 214. During the first leg of the flight, an unscheduled stop was made at Voronezh to pick up several passengers. After landing, a slight oil leak was discovered on the right engine, but the aircraft continued to Stalingrad. At Stalingrad the right engine was again leaking oil. The engine was cleaned and a valve cover tightened, stopping the leak. The aircraft took off for the return leg to Moscow. At 15:10 the crew radioed that they had feathered the right propeller and would make an emergency landing at Voronezh. The aircraft received permission to descend to 900 m (3,000 ft), but communication was lost later. The burning aircraft was found in a field 5 km (3.1 mi) from Voronezh Airport; the right engine and right wing were found 185 m (607 ft) and 550 m (1,800 ft) from the fuselage, respectively. The right engine failed, but unbeknownst to the crew, it was also on fire. At 800–900 m (2,600–3,000 ft) the burning engine fell off, but the wing was weakened by the fire and it too separated, causing a loss of control and the aircraft crashed. The engine failure was caused by a cracked cylinder liner in the No. 2 cylinder due to a manufacturing defect.	
15 September 1955	(Soviet Union) Kansky District	Il-12P	CCCP-Л1359	West Siberia	W/O	7/7	ATC failed to inform the crew of a thunderstorm that had formed on the flight route. The aircraft entered the storm and encountered severe turbulence and this placed heavy loads on the wings, causing the aircraft to break up. The aircraft then crashed upside down in a field. The aircraft was operating a domestic scheduled Moscow-Krasnoyarsk-Irkutsk-Khabarovsk passenger service as Flight 5.	
28 September 1955	(Soviet Union) Ozerevo	Li-2	CCCP-Л4712	Northern	W/O	7/19	En route to Leningrad the right engine failed due to an oil leak. The propeller could not be fathered due to the lack of oil. The crew decided to make an emergency landing at the Vypolzovo military airfield, but were unable to reach Vypolzovo ATC for 50 minutes. The aircraft later lost altitude and crashed in a potato field near Ozerevo. The aircraft was operating a domestic scheduled Moscow–Leningrad passenger service as Flight 349.	
9 December 1955	(Soviet Union) Tordoki Yani	Li-2	CCCP-Л4993	Far East	W/O	21/21	Struck the side of a mountain. The aircraft was flying too low through the Sikhote-Alin mountain range as the result of ATC errors. Caught in a strong downdraft, the aircraft lost altitude and crashed on the southeastern slope of Mount Tordoki Yani. The aircraft was operating a domestic scheduled Yuzhno-Sakhalinsk–Khabarovsk passenger service as Flight 976.	
9 December 1955	(Soviet Union) Tyumen Region	Li-2	CCCP-Л4339	Kazakhstan	W/O	7/9	While on the Sverdlovsk–Petropavlovsk leg the aircraft was blown off course by strong winds, stronger than forecast. To make matters worse, the radio compass failed and Petropavlovsk Airport was closed due to bad weather. The crew decided to divert to Kurgan, but could not establish contact with the airport and decided to return to Sverdlovsk, but the crew did not realize that the aircraft had deviated north of the flight route by 120 km (75 mi). The crew realized that fuel was insufficient for them to reach Sverdlovsk and continued to Petropavlovsk, although the airport was closed. The crew attempted to locate Petropavlovsk, although they were actually 215 km (134 mi) to the northeast. The aircraft ran out of fuel and a wheels-up forced landing was made in a snow-covered field near the Omsk-Tyumen rail line. The aircraft was operating a domestic scheduled Moscow–Kazan–Sverdlovsk–Petropavlovsk–Pavlodar–Ust-Kamenogorsk passenger service as Flight 101.	
21 December 1955	(Soviet Union) Balkhash Lake	Li-2	CCCP-Л4981	Kazakhstan	W/O	6/6	Eighty-six minutes after takeoff the crew reported that the gyroscopes had failed, due to a failure in the vacuum regulator. Communication with the aircraft was lost later; the wreckage was found the next day in the snow-covered Saryesik-Atyrau desert 105 km (65 mi) from Balkhash Airport. The crew probably became disorientated following the gyroscope failure and the aircraft later crashed. The aircraft was operating an Alma-Ata–Balkhash–Moscow cargo service as Flight 90.	
7 March 1956	Unknown	Li-2	CCCP-71289	Syktyvkar	W/O	Unknown	Crashed on takeoff.	
22 April 1956	(Soviet Union) Off Sukhumi	Il-14P	CCCP-Л1718	Moscow	W/O	6/6	The aircraft was operating a Sukhumi-Kutaisi cargo service as Flight 227. Shortly after takeoff from Sukhumi Airport the aircraft climbed to just 60 metres (200 ft) and began descending until it struck the surface of the Black Sea. The pilot may have been blinded by a searchlight from a nearby military base.	
26 April 1956	(East Germany) East Berlin	Il-12	Unknown	Unknown	W/O	3/6	Crashed after it struck a church tower in fog while on approach to Schönefeld Airport. The aircraft, probably an Ilyushin Il-12, was operating a Warsaw-East Berlin service.	
4 July 1956	(Soviet Union) Voronezh Airport	Li-2	CCCP-Л4869	North Caucasus	W/O	0	The aircraft had just completed the second leg of a Mineralnye Vody–Rostov–Voronezh–Moscow passenger service as Flight 256. While taxiing along a dirt taxiway to the airport terminal, at 300 m (980 ft) from the runway, the crew felt a sharp jolt and a dull explosion on the right side of the aircraft. The explosion had blown the aircraft onto its left wingtip and a fire erupted in the right engine, which later fell off. The fire spread to the fuselage, but all on board were able to escape before the aircraft partially burned out. The explosion was caused by a bomb (consisting of three TM-35 anti-tank mines) placed in 1943 by Soviet troops at a depth of 1.6–1.8 m (5.2–5.9 ft) in a filled-up bomb crater. The pressure of the right main landing gear on the earth separating the taxiway surface and the mines triggered the detonator, after which the bomb exploded.	
20 July 1956	(Soviet Union) Batagay	An-2T	CCCP-Л5554	East Siberia	W/O	4/6	Struck a mountain. The crew intentionally followed the wrong airway, flying at 1,400 m (4,600 ft). Although the crew did not sight land, they decided to continue rather than turn around. The aircraft entered cloud and deviated from the flight route. Rather than turning around, the crew descended to 1,300 m (4,300 ft) and later crashed into a 1,468-metre-high (4,816 ft) mountain and was destroyed by fire. The aircraft was operating a Batagay–Deputatsky–Batagay transport flight.	
20 August 1956	(Soviet Union) Gizhiga	An-2T	CCCP-Л3488	Far East	W/O	3/4	Crashed into terrain while flying in clouds, 23 kilometres (14 mi) out of Gizhiga, and was destroyed by fire. The aircraft had completed an aerogeophysical survey flight.	
16 September 1956	(Soviet Union) Syuldyukar	An-2T	CCCP-А2582	East Siberia	W/O	1/3	The aircraft was being ferried from Nyurba to ARB-401 at Novosibirsk for overhaul. While on approach to Botuobiya, the crew deviated from the approach pattern. Coming in too low, the main landing gear struck a river bank 1.5 m (4.9 ft) below of and 43 m (141 ft) short of the runway, causing the landing gear to break off. The aircraft then nosed over and caught fire.	
2 November 1956	(Soviet Union) Sverdlovsk	Li-2	CCCP-Л4872	West Siberia	W/O	2/5	Crashed in a forest. While on approach to Sverdlovsk, the crew deviated from the glide path in poor visibility. After passing the outer marker, both engines quit at 250 m (820 ft) due to fuel starvation after the crew forgot to move the fuel selector from the right tank to the left tank. The engines were restarted, but it was too late. The aircraft began hitting trees, causing the left wing to separate; the aircraft crashed in a forest 1,047 m (3,435 ft) behind the outer marker and broke apart. The aircraft was operating a Moscow–Izhevsk–Sverdlovsk–Omsk passenger service as Flight 39.	
18 November 1956	(Soviet Union) Irkutsk Airport	Il-14	CCCP-Л5658	East Siberia	W/O	1/5	The brand-new aircraft was on a Moscow-Irkutsk delivery flight. While on approach to Irkutsk in poor visibility, the crew did not follow the glide path and the aircraft touched down hard too soon, damaging the left main and nose landing gear, left wing, and both engines and eventually crashed into a wooden fence. The aircraft was written off and used for spare parts.	
9 December 1956	(Soviet Union) Anadyr	Li-2	CCCP-Л5033	Far East	W/O	12/12	The aircraft was operating a Lavrentiya–Uelkal–Anadyr passenger service. While on the Uelkal-Anadyr leg the aircraft deviated 8 km (5.0 mi) to the left of the flight route. The crew descended through cloud despite being unaware of the aircraft's position and the aircraft crashed into a hill on the slope of Mount Ioanna at 720 m (2,360 ft) and burned out.	
15 February 1957	(Soviet Union) Yamal Peninsula	Li-2	CCCP-Л4407	West Siberia	W/O	0/4	Force-landed in tundra between Yarato-1 and Yarato-2 lakes on the Yamal Peninsula. The aircraft was overloaded before takeoff from Mys Kamenny and this cargo was not secured, causing a loss of airspeed and a nose-high attitude on takeoff. Two crew members left the cockpit and moved to the tail and later the cargo shifted rearward and this pushed the nose even higher, although the pilot was able to straighten out just before landing. Due to complete a Mys Kamenny–Salekhard cargo service. Wreckage remains at the crash site.	
29 March 1957	(Soviet Union) Ulyanovsk	Li-2	CCCP-Л4967	Privolzhsk	W/O	4/4	Crashed following unexplained left wing separation, probably due to pilot error. The aircraft was operating a Kuibyshev–Ulyanovsk photo flight; personnel from the Ulyanovsk Automotive Plant were to photograph the aircraft from the ground.	
5 May 1957	(Soviet Union) Tanyurer	An-2T	CCCP-Л3807	Magadan	W/O	0/8	Crashed after the pilot lost control in a steep turn shortly after takeoff. The aircraft was operating an aerogeophysical survey flight.	
3 July 1957	(Soviet Union) near Stavropol	Li-2	CCCP-Л4825	Turkmenistan	W/O	8/15	Thirty-two minutes after takeoff, the aircraft struck treetops on Mount Strizhament, broke apart and was destroyed by fire. The aircraft was flying too low in poor visibility and ATC failed to correct it. The aircraft was operating an Ashgabat–Krasnovodsk–Baku–Mineralnye Vody–Krasnodar–Simferopol passenger service as Flight 461.	
7 August 1957	(Soviet Union) Magdagachi Airport	Il-12P	CCCP-Л1828	Far East	W/O	1/17	While on approach to Magdagachi the crew deviated from the approach path due to strong winds. The aircraft came in too high and descended too quickly. The crew failed to go-around and the nose wheel struck a mast of a landing light 500 m (1,600 ft) past the outer marker. The aircraft struck five more landing light masts with the cockpit and wings before crashing short of the runway in a field. The aircraft was operating an Irkutsk–Magdagachi–Khabarovsk passenger service as Flight 554a.	
15 August 1957	(Denmark) Copenhagen	Il-14P	CCCP-Л1874	Moscow	W/O	23/23	Crashed into the Copenhagen harbour after striking the chimney of a power plant while on approach to Kastrup Airport. The aircraft was operating a Moscow-Riga-Copenhagen international service as Flight 103.	
17 August 1957	(Soviet Union) Kiev	Il-14M	CCCP-Л2071	Ukraine	W/O	15	Both aircraft were involved in a mid-air collision. The Il-14M was practicing takeoffs and landings. On the second takeoff, the Il-14M collided with the Il-14G that was on approach to Zhulyany Airport. The Il-14M lost its right engine and the cockpit was sheared off while the Il-14G's right wing separated after a fuel tank exploded; six people on the ground also died when the wreckage fell on two houses. The Il-14M was operating a training flight; the Il-14G was operating a Sofia–Kiev cargo service as Flight 126.	
17 August 1957	(Soviet Union) Kiev	Il-14G	CCCP-Л1360	Ukraine	W/O	15		
30 August 1957	(Soviet Union) Slovita	Il-14G	CCCP-Л1440	Ukraine	W/O	7/7	En route to Kiev, the crew was flying VFR in bad weather and poor visibility, forcing them to follow a road. The crew lost sight of the road while flying through cloud and attempted to locate the road, but the aircraft crashed on a wooded hill. The aircraft was operating a Lviv–Kiev–Moscow cargo service.	
1 October 1957	(Soviet Union) Aksha	Il-12P	CCCP-Л1389	East Siberia	W/O	27/28	After takeoff from Irkutsk, the crew deviated from the flight route. The crew became disorientated and were unable to find their destination. The aircraft ran low on fuel in the crew's attempts to find Chita. Low on fuel, the crew decided to make a forced landing near a settlement, but on the fourth attempt to land the aircraft struck trees at 900 m (3,000 ft) on a hillside 3 km (1.9 mi) southeast of Aksha and crashed upside down on the other side of the hill. The aircraft was operating the second leg of a domestic scheduled Moscow-Irkutsk-Chita-Khabarovsk service as Flight 11.	
2 December 1957	(Finland) Helsinki	Il-14M	CCCP-Л1657	Moscow	W/O	0/21	Overshot the runway on landing, ran over an embankment, and came to rest on a road. The aircraft was completing an international scheduled Moscow–Leningrad–Helsinki passenger service as Flight 107.	
18 December 1957	(Soviet Union) Jewish Autonomous Region	Il-12P	CCCP-Л1309	East Siberia	W/O	27/27	Disappeared while operating the first leg of a domestic scheduled Khabarovsk-Magdagachi-Moscow passenger service as Flight 10. The wreckage was found in June 1958 on the slope of Mount Poktoy, 30 km (19 mi) west of Birobidzhan. While parked at Khabarovsk Airport and during taxiing for takeoff, the rudder was damaged by strong winds. The rudder failed 26 minutes into the flight, causing a loss of control. A second Il-12 (CCCP-Л1330) also suffered rudder damage.	
9 June 1958	(Soviet Union) Magadan	Il-12P	CCCP-Л1364	Far East	W/O	24/24	Struck a wooded hillside in bad weather. The aircraft descended to 600 m (2,000 ft) and changed course towards mountainous terrain. The aircraft descended again and entered clouds. The aircraft began to strike tree tops and crashed into a hillside at 430 m (1,410 ft). The aircraft was operating a domestic scheduled Khabarovsk-Okhotsk-Magadan passenger service as Flight 105.	
27 June 1958	(Soviet Union) Byelaya Loch	An-2T	CCCP-05643	Magadan	W/O	2/6	The aircraft struck a hill, stalled, and crashed out of Seymchan during a survey flight.	
2 July 1958	(Soviet Union) Inta	An-2T	CCCP-Л3803	Komi	W/O	4/4	Flew into the side of a mountain at 600 m (2,000 ft) in adverse weather while operating a Pelengachi-Kazhim (Khanty-Mansisk autonomous district) service.	
15 August 1958	(Soviet Union) Chita	Tu-104A	CCCP-Л5442	Moscow	W/O	64/64	While en route a domestic scheduled Khabarovsk-Irkutsk passenger service as Flight 04, the aircraft ascended to 12,000 metres (39,000 ft) from 10,800 metres (35,400 ft) after entering a turbulent upstream, stalled, spun down, and crashed near Chita.	
5 September 1958	(Soviet Union) Jõhvi	Avia 14P	CCCP-Л2048	Estonia	W/O	1/17	A passenger attempted to hijack the aircraft 30 minutes after takeoff. The hijacker handed a note to a stewardess, who then handed it to the pilot. The pilot locked himself in the cockpit and got a firearm. The hijacker then attempted to break down the door to the cockpit. The crew reported the attack and prepared to make an emergency landing. In response to the attempts to open the door, the pilot opened fire. The pilot handed the gun to the mechanic who also fired shots. The flight engineer fired off the final shots. Unbeknownst to the crew, lit cigarettes had started a fire. The aircraft landed in flames at the airport; all on board were able to escape the aircraft except the hijacker who died when the aircraft burned out. The aircraft was operating a Moscow-Leningrad-Tallinn passenger service as Flight 365.	
7 September 1958	(Soviet Union) Konstantinovka	Il-14P	CCCP-Л1692	Kyrgyzstan	W/O	27/27	During the final leg from Aktyubinsk (now Aktobe) to Moscow, the crew were unaware that thunderstorms had formed on the flight route. The aircraft flew into a thunderstorm and was struck by lightning, incapacitating the pilots. The lightning strike also damaged the control cable for the left aileron. Control was lost and the aircraft entered a left turn followed by a high-speed dive. The aircraft was operating a domestic scheduled Frunze (now Bishkek)-Aktyubinsk-Moscow passenger service as Flight 164.	
19 September 1958	(Soviet Union) Lazo	Il-12P	CCCP-Л3904	Magadan	W/O	28/28	While en route to Khabarovsk the crew got lost at night in poor weather. The controller failed to determine the position of the aircraft. The aircraft ran out of fuel and crashed into a wooded slope at 850 m (2,790 ft). The aircraft was operating a domestic scheduled Magadan-Okhotsk-Khabarovsk passenger service.	
10 October 1958	(Soviet Union) Smyshlyaevka	Li-2	CCCP-84733	Privolzhsk	W/O	4/5	Crashed during a training flight due to possible fuel exhaustion.	
16 October 1958	(Soviet Union) Sukpai	Li-2	CCCP-65708	MAG SPiVS	W/O	0	During an aerial photography flight the left engine caught fire. The pilot descended and attempted a wheels-up forced landing in the tundra. The aircraft crashed some 82 km (51 mi) southeast of Sukpai near the Aksu River in the Sikhot-Alin mountains. The wreckage remains at the crash site.	
17 October 1958	(Soviet Union) Kanash	Tu-104A	CCCP-42362	Moscow	W/O	80/80	The aircraft was operating a non-scheduled Beijing-Omsk-Moscow passenger service. The crew was unable to land at Moscow due to fog and diverted to Sverdlovsk. The aircraft entered a powerful upstream at 10,000 metres (33,000 ft) and ascended to 12,000 metres (39,000 ft), stalled and entered a vertical dive. The crew was able to correct the angle of descent a bit at 2,000 metres (6,600 ft), but it was too late. The aircraft crashed 27 km (17 mi) west of Kanash.	
25 October 1958	(Soviet Union) Nizhniye Kresty Airport	An-2	Unknown	Unknown	W/O	0	While parked at Nizhniye Kresty (now Chersky) Airport, the aircraft was hijacked by two men who demanded to be flown to the US and threatened to blow up the aircraft if this demand wasn't met. The pilots notified airport personnel who then contacted the police and the KGB. After negotiations broke down, the aircraft was stormed.	
2 November 1958	(Soviet Union) Grakhovo	Li-2	CCCP-84624	Ukraine	W/O	4/4	Crashed following an in-flight fire. The aircraft was operating a Stalino-Penza-Izhevsk cargo service. The cargo consisted of zinc nitrate contained in glass bottles packed in baskets with wood chips. During the flight some of the bottles broke. With the heating system on, the zinc nitrate reacted with the packing material inside the cargo hold, starting a fire. The fire spread to the rear of the aircraft. After landing, the zinc nitrate decomposed into nitric oxide and oxygen and ignited gasoline vapor, causing an explosion. The four crew members were blown back some 180 m (590 ft); none of them survived.	
7 November 1958	(Soviet Union) Crimean Oblast	Avia 14P	CCCP-52024	Azerbaijan	W/O	12/12	While en route between Sochi and Simferopol the crew encountered poor visibility and radio interference. While on approach to Simferopol the aircraft entered clouds. Unknown to the crew, the aircraft had deviated south from the flight route by 25 km (16 mi). The aircraft then struck a mountain at 900 m (3,000 ft) some 50 km (31 mi) from Simferpol. The aircraft was operating a domestic scheduled Baku-Sochi-Simferpol passenger service as Flight 667.	
24 November 1958	(Soviet Union) Anadyr	An-2T	CCCP-Л5676	Magadan	W/O	0/4	Stalled and crashed due to shifting cargo.	
7 December 1958	(Soviet Union) Stalingrad	Il-14M	CCCP-Л2096	North Caucasus	W/O	1/24	Struck trees and crashed short of the runway on the second approach to land in bad weather. The aircraft was completing a domestic scheduled Voronezh-Stalingrad passenger service as Flight 213.	
15 December 1958	(Soviet Union) Baratayevka Airport	Il-14	CCCP-41843	Ulyanovsk Flight School	W/O	4/7	Stalled and crashed on approach during a training flight due to pilot errors and wing icing.	
15 December 1958	(Soviet Union) Cherepovets Airport	Il-12	CCCP-Л1467	Ural	W/O	0	The aircraft landed too far down the runway and could not stop in time, overrunning the runway into a ditch, suffering substantial damage. The aircraft was completing a Leningrad–Cherepovets service.	
23 December 1958	(Soviet Union) Tashkent	Il-14M	CCCP-61663	Uzbekistan	W/O	21/21	Stalled and crashed while attempting a go-around in poor weather. The aircraft was operating a domestic scheduled Mineralye Vody-Ashgabat-Tashkent passenger service as Flight 466.	
24 December 1958	(Soviet Union) Uralsk Airport	Il-12T	CCCP-Л1458	Kazakhstan	W/O	0/5	After the aircraft lifted off, the pilot ordered the flight engineer to raise the landing gear. After a long takeoff run the flight engineer panicked when he saw a rail line embankment and shut off the engine ignition by mistake. The aircraft touched down again and continued for 211 m (692 ft) until it ran off the runway and struck a telephone pole.	
18 January 1959	(Soviet Union) Stalingrad	Il-14P	CCCP-41863	Azerbaijan	W/O	25/25	Crashed while on approach to Stalingrad, 5 kilometres (3.1 mi) out of the airport. The aircraft descended to 400 metres (1,300 ft) on finals when contact was lost; it rolled to the right, crashed into a snowy field, and was destroyed by fire. The cause was not determined, but the aircraft may have been shot down. The aircraft was operating the second leg of a domestic scheduled Moscow-Voronezh-Stalingrad-Baku passenger service as Flight 205.	
19 January 1959	Unknown	An-2T	CCCP-Л1975	Yakut	W/O	Unknown	Stalled on takeoff and crashed.	
4 February 1959	(Soviet Union) Severo-Evensk	Li-2	CCCP-16192	Magadan	W/O	0/6	Crashed on a hill in bad weather. The crew decided to descend through clouds despite being unaware of their position. The aircraft struck a hill with its right engine, continued to fly for another 800 m (2,600 ft) and came to rest upon another hill at 760 m (2,490 ft) some 30 km (19 mi) west of Severo-Evensk. The aircraft was operating a Magadan–Severo-Evensk–Gizhiga cargo service.	
April 1959	Unknown	An-2T	CCCP-Л5569	Yakut	W/O	Unknown	Ran through shallow water and struck an embankment.	
24 April 1959	(Soviet Union) Novosibirsk Region	Li-2P	CCCP-84595	West Siberia	W/O	5/8	During an aeromagnetic survey flight, the right engine failed due to fuel starvation after the crew forgot to move the fuel selector from a nearly empty tank to another tank. The crew attempted but failed to restart the engine, instead of feathering the propeller. The crew raised the magnetometer gondola and attempted to perform an emergency landing in a field, but the aircraft lost airspeed, missed the field, crashed in a forest and burned out.	
18 June 1959	(Soviet Union) Deputatsky Airport	Li-2T	CCCP-84627	Yakut	W/O	0	The center wing section suffered damage following an incident at the airport. Due to the airport's location in the Far North, repairs proved impossible and the aircraft was written off instead.	
10 August 1959	(Soviet Union) Khabarovsk region	Li-2	CCCP-54795	Yakut	W/O	9/9	Struck a forested mountain slope during a survey flight.	
29 August 1959	(Soviet Union) Magdagachi Airport	Li-2	CCCP-84598	East Siberia	W/O	0/11	Took off with an improperly set rubber trim tab.	
2 September 1959	(Soviet Union) Voronezh Region	Il-18B	CCCP-75676	Moscow	W/O	0/67	The aircraft climbed to 10,000 m (33,000 ft) after takeoff from Moscow, which was too high for the aircraft's weight. Near Voronezh, the aircraft entered a thunderstorm and was pushed by an updraft to 10,700 m (35,100 ft) and descended to 7,000 m (23,000 ft) in a strong downdraft. During this descent, the propellers on the outer engines were automatically feathered. The aircraft entered a second downdraft and was pushed down to 2,800 m (9,200 ft). The crew diverted and returned to Moscow. The aircraft, operating a Moscow–Sochi passenger service as Flight 249, was written off due to the structural damage it sustained.	
2 October 1959	(Soviet Union) Petropavlovsk-Kamchatsky	Li-2	CCCP-84448	Far East	W/O	4/4	The crew failed to account for wind drift, causing the aircraft to deviate 15 km (9.3 mi) to the left of the flight route. While descending through cloud, the aircraft struck a glacier at 2,900 metres (9,500 ft) on the north slope of Mount Aag, 42 km (26 mi) north of Khalaktyrka Airport. The aircraft was operating a Milkovo–Petropavlovsk-Kamchatsky cargo service.	
23 October 1959	(Soviet Union) Moscow	Il-14P	CCCP-41806	Azerbaijan	W/O	28/29	Crashed in a forest on approach to Vnukovo Airport and was destroyed by fire. While at 900 metres (3,000 ft), the aircraft was cleared to land and began descending until striking trees, 1,400 metres (4,600 ft) short of the runway. It was operating the last leg of a domestic scheduled Baku-Makhachkala-Astrakhan-Stalingrad-Moscow passenger service as Flight 200.	
27 October 1959	(Soviet Union) near Karaganda Airport	Li-2	CCCP-84733	Kazakhstan	W/O	1/29	During the second approach to land at Karaganda, the aircraft lost altitude and speed, causing the right wing to contact the ground. The aircraft crashed in the steppe 600 m (2,000 ft) short of and 71 m (233 ft) to the left of the runway. The aircraft was completing a domestic scheduled Omsk–Ekibastuz–Pavlodar–Karaganda passenger service.	
16 November 1959	(Soviet Union) Lvov	An-10	CCCP-11167	Ukraine	W/O	40/40	Crashed on approach to Sknyliv Airport, 2.1 kilometres (1.3 mi) short of the airfield. When the crew selected 45 degrees of flaps the nose suddenly pitched down and the crew could not regain control. It was operating a domestic scheduled Moscow-Lvov passenger service as Flight 315.	
19 November 1959	Unknown	Li-2	CCCP-84633	Far East	W/O	Unknown	Crashed. The wreckage later became corroded as it sat in the open air for a long period of time at the crash site.	
29 November 1959	(Soviet Union) Irkutsk Airport	Il-12	CCCP-01426	East Siberia	W/O	4/4	Crashed while attempting to land in poor visibility. The aircraft deviated to the right of the runway and touched down on the grass. The pilot realized the mistake and attempted to make a left turn but the left wing struck the ground. The aircraft struck two trenches, destroying the cockpit section. The aircraft was completing a Mama–Kirensk–Irkutsk cargo service as Flight V-8.	
13 December 1959	(Soviet Union) Off Boysun	Il-14P	CCCP-91577	Uzbekistan	W/O	30/30	Crashed into mountainous terrain, 27 kilometres (17 mi) northeast of Boysun, after the crew deviated from the planned route to avoid bad weather. The aircraft was operating the last leg of a Kabul–Tashkent passenger service as Flight 120.	
17 December 1959	(Soviet Union) Vilnius	Li-2P	CCCP-84587	Lithuania	W/O	1/9	Crashed on takeoff. The pilot failed to follow the takeoff procedures and the aircraft took off at low speed and a nose-high attitude. The aircraft then banked, touched down, bounced several times, struck two poles and a mound, after which it slid into a trench and burned out. Due to operate a domestic scheduled Vilnius–Riga–Leningrad passenger service as Flight 345.	

== See also ==
- Aeroflot accidents and incidents
- Aeroflot accidents and incidents in the 1960s
- Aeroflot accidents and incidents in the 1970s
- Aeroflot accidents and incidents in the 1980s
- Aeroflot accidents and incidents in the 1990s
- Transport in the Soviet Union
