= Kazan (disambiguation) =

Kazan is the capital city of the Republic of Tatarstan, Russia.

Kazan may also refer to:

== Places ==
- Kazan, Ankara, former name of Kahramankazan, a suburb and a metropolitan district of Ankara, Turkey
- Kazan River, a river in the Kivalliq Region of Nunavut, Canada
- Kazan Region, a physiographic province of Canada
- Kazan Urban Okrug, a municipal formation into which the city of republic significance of Kazan in the Republic of Tatarstan, Russia is incorporated
- Great Kazan and Small Kazan gorges, part of the Iron Gates gorge of the Danube River
- Old Kazan or İske Qazan, a historic town in modern-day Tatarstan
- Kazan Wildland Park, a provincial park in Alberta, Canada
- Kāsān, alternative name of the village of Kesar in Gilan Province, Iran
- Kazan-retto, a Japanese island group also known as the Volcano Islands

=== Airports ===
- Kazan International Airport, southeast of Kazan
- Kazan-2 Airport, older airfield now in the northeastern part of the city
- Kazan-Borisoglebskoye or Borisoglebskoye Airfield, an experimental airfield north of the city

== Arts, entertainment, and media ==
- Kazan (1921 film), a lost silent film
- Kazan (1949 film), an American drama film
- Kazan (novel), a 1914 book by James Oliver Curwood
- Kazan (manga), a manga by Gaku Miyao
- Kazan, a character in the 1997 movie Cube

== Historical formations ==
- Khanate of Kazan (1438–1552), a medieval state in Europe
- Kazan Governorate (1708–1920), a division of the Tsardom of Russia, the Russian Empire, and the early Russian SFSR
- Kazan Principality, a principality within Volga Bulgaria and the Golden Horde

== People ==
- Emperor Kazan (968–1008), Japanese emperor
- Abraham E. Kazan (1889–1971), American trade union activist
- Elia Kazan (1909–2003), American theatre and film director
- Frances Kazan, English-born author
- Lainie Kazan (born 1940), American actress
- Molly Kazan (1906–1963), American dramatist and playwright
- Nicholas Kazan (born 1945), American writer, producer, and director
- Rabia Kazan (born 1976), Turkish journalist
- Vangelis Kazan (1936/1938–2008), Greek character actor
- Watanabe Kazan (1793–1841), Japanese politician and painter
- Zoe Kazan (born 1983), American actress and playwright

== Other uses ==
- Our Lady of Kazan, Orthodox icon of the Theotokos
- Kazan (cookware), a type of large cooking pot
- FC Rubin Kazan, a Russian football club based in the city of Kazan, Tatarstan republic
- Russian submarine Kazan (K-561)
- Kazan Helicopters, a Russian helicopter design bureau and manufacturer
- SS Kazan, a Hansa A Type cargo ship in service 1946-73

== See also ==
- Kazanka (disambiguation)
- Kazansky (disambiguation)
- Kazan Cathedral (disambiguation)
- Kazon, fictional race in the Star Trek universe
- Qazan (disambiguation)
- Gazan (disambiguation)
- Ghazan (1271–1304), 13th century Mongol leader of the Ilkhanate
- Karzan (disambiguation)
