= Kazanka =

Kazanka may refer to:

Settlements

- Kazanka (Arsky District), a village in Tatarstan, Russia
- Kazanka (Bagansky District), a village in Novosibirsk Oblast, Russia
- Kazanka (Cheremshansky District), a village in Tatarstan, Russia
- Kazanka, Primorsky Krai, a village in the Partizansky Urban District, Russia
- Kazanka, Ukraine, an urban-type settlement in Mykolaiv Oblast, Ukraine

Other

- Kazanka (river), a river in the Republic of Tatarstan, Russia
- Kazanka (boat), a type of motorboat

== See also ==
- Kazan (disambiguation)
