= Flight 365 =

Flight 365 may refer to:

Listed chronologically

- Aeroflot Flight 365, hijacked on 5 September 1958
- Thai Airways Flight 365, crashed on 31 August 1987
