= Aeroflot Flight 31 (disambiguation) =

Aeroflot Flight 31 may refer to:

- Aeroflot Flight 31 (1955), a cargo flight that crashed during takeoff in Moscow
- 1976 Anapa mid-air collision, between Aeroflot Flight S-31 and Aeroflot Flight 7957 near Anapa, USSR
