= Kazansky =

Kazansky (masculine), Kazanskaya (feminine), or Kazanskoye (neuter) may refer to:

- Kazansky District, a district in Tyumen Oblast, Russia
- Moscow Kazanskaya railway station, a railway station in Moscow, Russia
- Kazansky Bridge, a bridge across the Griboyedov Canal in St. Petersburg, Russia
- Kazansky (rural locality) (Kazanskaya, Kazanskoye), several rural localities in Russia
- Michel Kazanski (born 1953), French archaeologist

== See also ==
- Kazan (disambiguation)
