= Qazvin (disambiguation) =

Qazvin is a city in Qazvin County, Qazvin Province, Iran.

Qazvin or Ghazvin may also refer to:

- Qazvin County, Iran
- Qazvīn Province, Iran
- Ghazvin, Kurdistan
- Caspian Sea, as it was known by ancient Arabic sources
