= Flight 227 =

Flight 227 may refer to:

Listed chronologically

- Aeroflot Flight 227 (1956), crashed on 22 April 1956
- United Air Lines Flight 227, crashed on 11 November 1965
- Aeroflot Flight 227 (1969), crashed on 13 October 1969
- SouthJet Air Flight 227, a fictional aviation accident from the 2012 film Flight starring Denzel Washington, set in October 2011
