= Aeroflot Flight 227 =

Aeroflot Flight 227 may refer to:

- Aeroflot Flight 227 (1956), crashed on 22 April 1956 in the Black Sea near the coast of Sukhumi (see: Aeroflot accidents and incidents in the 1950s)
- Aeroflot Flight 227 (1969), crashed on 13 October 1969 during landing at Nizhnevartovsk Airport (see: Aeroflot accidents and incidents in the 1960s)
