= Karzan =

Karzan may refer to:

- Karzan, the main character in the 1938 Tamil film Vanaraja Karzan
- Karzan Kardozi (born 1983), Kurdish film director and writer
- Karzan Kader (born 1982), Kurdish film actor, director and writer

== See also ==
- Kazan (disambiguation)
- Curzon (disambiguation)
- Carzan
- Karsan
