= Aeroflot Flight 200 =

1959 aviation accident

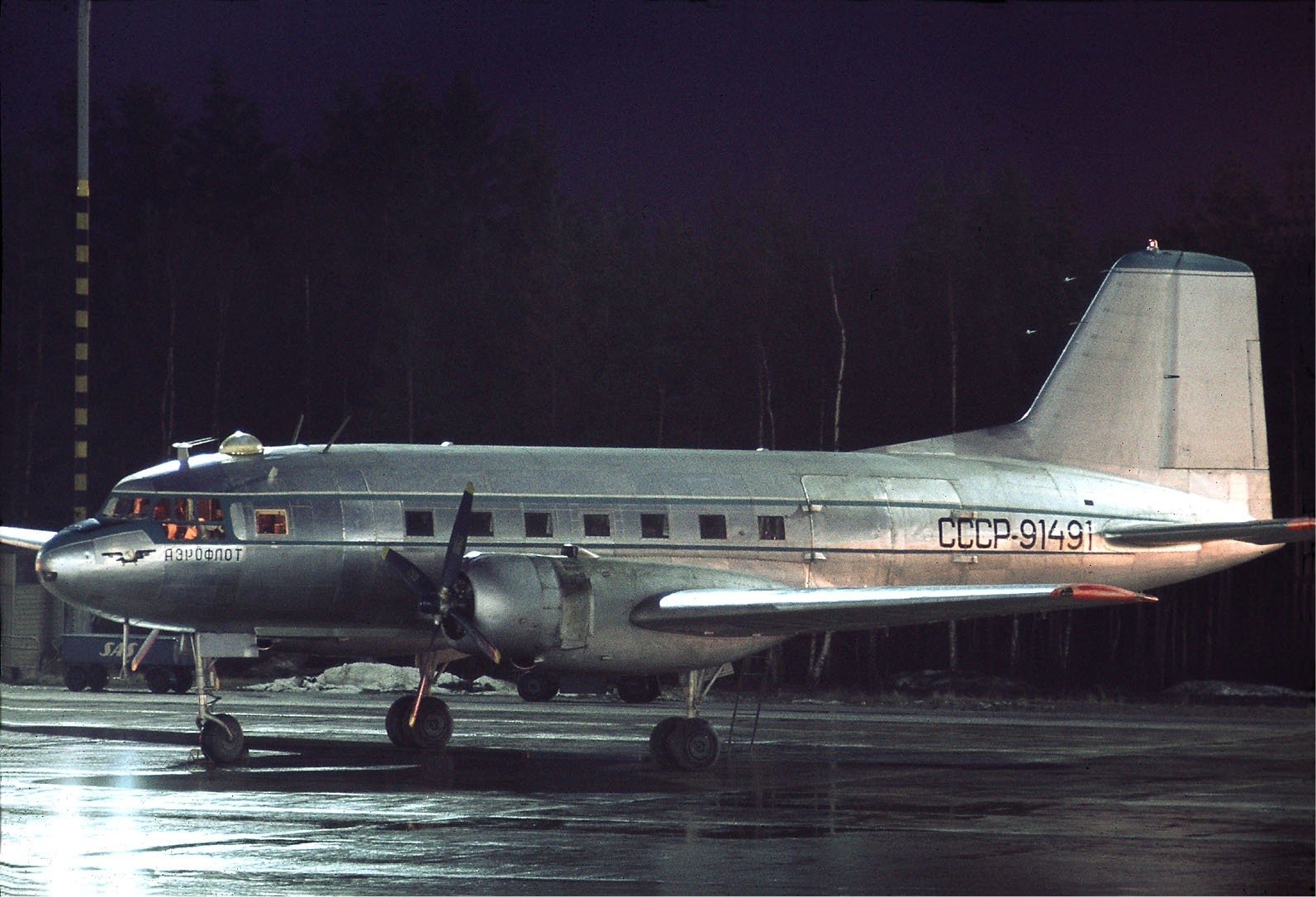
- An Il-14 similar to the one that crashed

Accident
- Date: 23 October 1959
- Summary: Pilot inexperience, poor visibility
- Site: Vnukovo Airport, Moscow Oblast, Soviet Union

Aircraft
- Aircraft type: Ilyushin Il-14M
- Operator: Aeroflot
- Registration: CCCP-41806
- Flight origin: Baku
- Destination: Vnukovo Airport
- Occupants: 29
- Passengers: 24
- Crew: 5
- Fatalities: 28
- Survivors: 1

On October 23, 1959, an Ilyushin Il-14 operating as Aeroflot Flight 200 crashed while attempting to land at Vnukovo Airport near Moscow, Moscow Oblast, Russian SFSR, USSR. After being delayed due to bad weather, the aircraft attempted to touch down around 22:00 but crashed approximately 1,400 meters (4,500 feet) short of the runway after striking trees. Bad weather and pilot error contributed to the crash.

== Background ==
The aircraft that crashed was an Il-14P, serial number 6341709, built in 1956 at the Tashkent Plant in Uzbekistan and delivered on August 31 of that year. It was assigned the registration CCCP-Л5086 and flew for the State Department of Azerbaijan for 2 years, based out of Baku. The aircraft was converted to an Il-14M on an unknown date. In 1958 or 1959, it was acquired by Aeroflot, re-registered as CCCP-41806, and began operating for the 107th Flight Detachment as a passenger airliner. It had flown for 4,945 hours at the time of the accident.

== Accident ==
The airplane was in the process of flying the Baku-Makhachkala-Astrakhan-Stalingrad-Moscow route, but had been dealing with poor weather conditions that had hampered the crew on their journey. They had arrived in Stalingrad two hours late and the crew had been working for over 15 hours at the time of the crash, which may have contributed to the accident. At 14:20, the airplane took off for Vnukovo, but found it was closed due to weather conditions and the flight returned to Stalingrad at 17:15, 1 hour 55 minutes after takeoff. At 18:50 the crew again attempted to reach Moscow, but were fatigued after having been on duty for 13 hours and 50 minutes, 5 hours and 53 minutes of which were spent in the air. Due to fog, the airliner flew at only 4,500 metres (14,800 ft), and visibility was just 1.5–2 kilometres (4,900–6,600 ft); another Il-14 that had recently landed reported that the cloud base was 50–60 metres (160–200 ft); despite this, the actual weather was not reported to the crew before they arrived. As the crew neared Vnukovo, they reported approaching the glide path, which was confirmed by ATC. Soon, at the command of the air traffic controller, the airplane turned 2° to the left and entered the track line. The controller saying "to the left two." was the last thing the pilots heard. At 22:10, the aircraft struck trees roughly 20 m off the ground, causing it to crash 1,400 metres (4,600 ft) from the runway's threshold and 75 metres (246 ft) from its center. The wreckage was found in the forest collapsed and partially burned.

== Investigation ==
Of the 29 passengers and crew on board, only one, a courier for the Azerbaijani SSR, survived. The accident was attributed to pilot error that resulted in a premature loss of altitude, which led to the craft colliding with obstacles. The PIC was of only average skill and the crew did not know how to bring the airplane down safely in dense fog. In addition, the controller responsible for the flight was a trainee who was not officially allowed to work with the precision approach radar independently and did not convey the range or the proper altitude to the crew, which would have enabled them to potentially avert the crash. As he was distracted giving corrections to their course, he did not notice the airplane had descended to a dangerously low altitude and thus did not warn the pilots.

== See also ==
- List of military aircraft of the Soviet Union and the CIS
- Aeroflot accidents and incidents in the 1950s
