= Cathedral of Our Lady of Kazan =

Kazan Cathedral may refer to:

- Kazan Cathedral, St. Petersburg (Cathedral of Our Lady of Kazan)
- Kazan Cathedral, Moscow (Cathedral of Our Lady of Kazan)
- Kazan Cathedral, Volgograd
- Kazan Cathedral, Havana
- Cathedral of the Annunciation in the Kazan Kremlin
