= Aeroflot Flight 35 =

1953 aviation accident

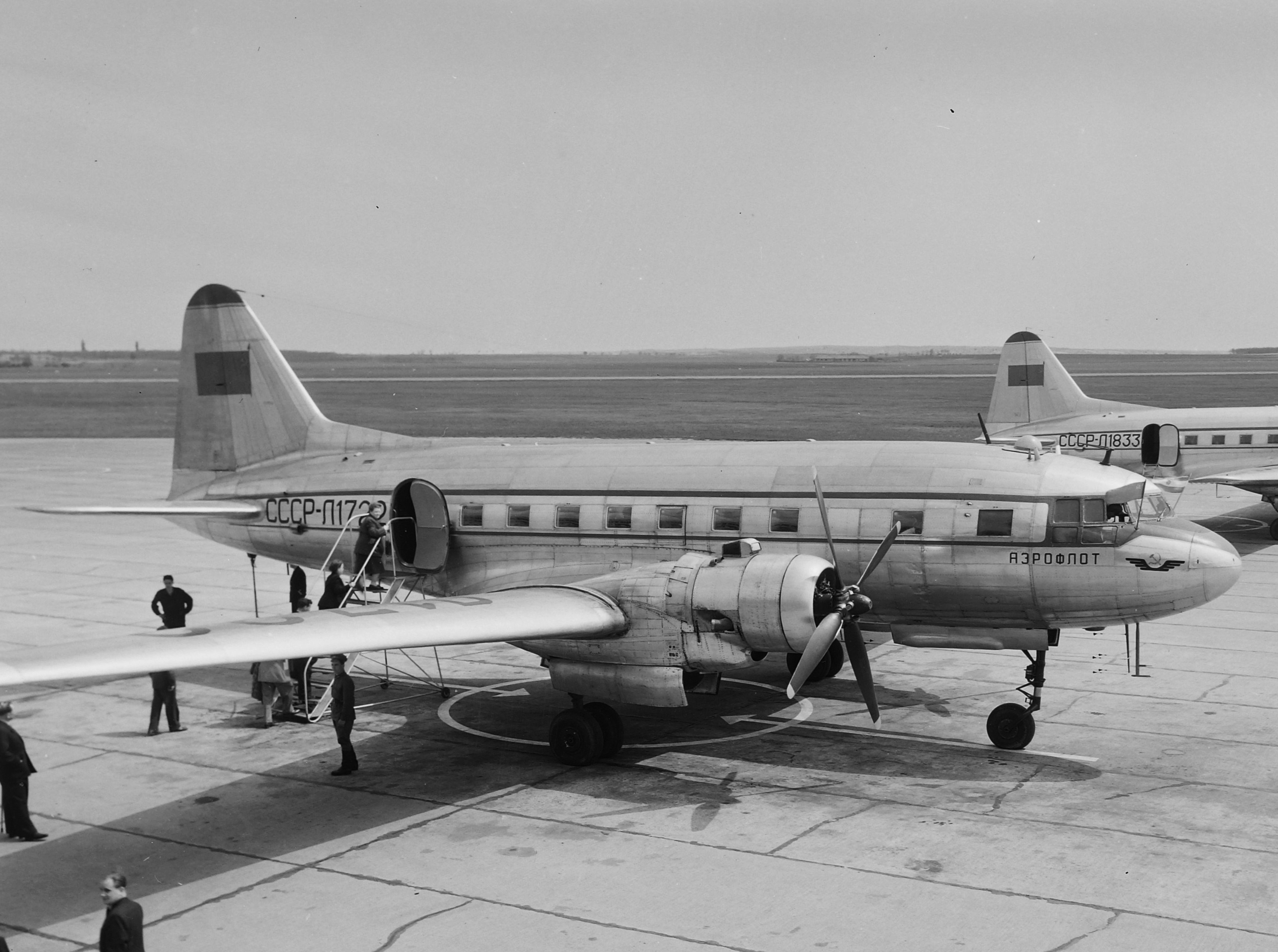
- An Il-12 similar to the one involved

Accident
- Date: 30 April 1953
- Summary: Bird strike leading to ditching
- Site: Volga, Kazan, Tatarstan, Russian SFSR

Aircraft
- Aircraft type: Ilyushin Il-12
- Operator: Aeroflot
- Registration: CCCP-Л1777
- Flight origin: Vnukovo International Airport, Moscow, Russian SFSR
- Stopover: Kazan-2 Airport, Kazan, Tatarstan, Russian SFSR
- Destination: Severny Airport, Novosibirsk, Novosibirsk Oblast, Russian SFSR
- Occupants: 23
- Passengers: 18
- Crew: 5
- Fatalities: 1
- Survivors: 22

Aeroflot Flight 35 was a domestic route from Vnukovo International Airport in Moscow to Severny Airport in Novosibirsk, with a stop at Kazan-2 Airport in Kazan. On 30 April 1953, the Ilyushin Il-12 flying this route suffered a bird strike, causing the engines to fail, of which then the crew decided to ditch in the Volga River in Kazan, saving all but one passenger on the flight.

== Aircraft and crew ==
The aircraft involved was a Ilyushin Il-12 registered as CCCP-Л1777 and was produced on March 24, 1949. It was delivered to 65th Aviation Detachment (Vnukovo Airlines now).

The crew consisted of:

- Captain: Rodion Mikhailovich Suvorov
- Co-pilot: Anatoly Alekseevich Krestenko
- Flight mechanic: Nikolai Vasilyevich Maltsev
- Flight attendant: V.I. Lopatin
- Flight attendant: Shlyapenko

== Accident ==
=== In flight ===
The aircraft took off at 19:11, and climbed to 1,200 m (3,900 ft) under VFR. After passing over Surovatikha, the crew noticed thunderstorms ahead, so they descended to 600–700 m (2,000–2,300 ft), bypassing the thunderstorm. The plane entered Kazan airspace at an altitude of 600 m (2,000 ft). Upon landing, the crew requested entry to the circling approach area, and they were instructed to descend to 300 m (980 ft).

At 21:37, the plane encountered a sudden impact. Both engines simultaneously stopped working, and the exhaust pipe caught fire. The crew were unable to extinguish the fire. The aircraft was rapidly losing altitude. Captain Rodion prepared for a forced landing and successfully ditched in the Volga River.

=== Rescue operation ===
After landing, the water began to fill the plane. The crew members were locked inside the cockpit which was blocked by a load in the front cabin, but managed to escape from the help of passengers. The Il-12 sank at the depth of 18 meters, and the occupants were waiting for rescue. The accident was witnessed by the local residents, so they immediately approached to the scene and saved the people by boat. The occupants were taken ashore. One passenger drowned as he had a coat on, which prevented him from staying afloat.

According to a passenger in the investigation, the crew announced the forced landing on the ground, which made the passengers to pack up their belongings instead of immediately leaving off the aircraft.

== Investigation ==
The investigation revealed that the plane had collided with a pack of ducks. Pieces of them were found between the cylinders of the left propeller. A duck had hit the cockpit glass, reducing the pilots' visibility. The strike caused the ignition of both of the propellers to fail. This caused the combustible mixture that entered the cylinders to ignite inside the exhaust pipes; therefore, the crew mistook it with an in-flight fire.

== Aftermath ==
The remains of the plane were recovered on May 16, 1953 - 16 days after the accident, and was written off ten days later.
