= Kazansky (rural locality) =

Set index of articles associated with the same name

Kazansky (Russian: Казанский; masculine), Kazanskaya (Казанская; feminine), or Kazanskoye (Казанское; neuter) is the name of several rural localities in Russia:

- Kazansky, Bryansk Oblast, a settlement in Ormensky Selsoviet of Vygonichsky District of Bryansk Oblast
- Kazansky, Lipetsk Oblast, a settlement in Lamskoy Selsoviet of Stanovlyansky District of Lipetsk Oblast
- Kazansky, Nizhny Novgorod Oblast, a settlement in Otarsky Selsoviet of Vorotynsky District of Nizhny Novgorod Oblast
- Kazansky, Bolkhovsky District, Oryol Oblast, a settlement in Borovskoy Selsoviet of Bolkhovsky District of Oryol Oblast
- Kazansky, Mtsensky District, Oryol Oblast, a settlement in Podberezovsky Selsoviet of Mtsensky District of Oryol Oblast
- Kazanskoye, Sernursky District, Mari El Republic, a selo in Kazansky Rural Okrug of Sernursky District of the Mari El Republic
- Kazanskoye, Sovetsky District, Mari El Republic, a village in Alexeyevsky Rural Okrug of Sovetsky District of the Mari El Republic
- Kazanskoye, Moscow Oblast, a selo in Rakhmanovskoye Rural Settlement of Pavlovo-Posadsky District of Moscow Oblast
- Kazanskoye, Oryol Oblast, a selo in Kazansky Selsoviet of Livensky District of Oryol Oblast
- Kazanskoye, Tambov Oblast, a selo in Bolshedorozhensky Selsoviet of Staroyuryevsky District of Tambov Oblast
- Kazanskoye, Tula Oblast, a selo in Dorobinsky Rural Okrug of Tyoplo-Ogaryovsky District of Tula Oblast
- Kazanskoye, Tver Oblast, a village in Kemetskoye Rural Settlement of Bologovsky District of Tver Oblast
- Kazanskoye, Kazansky District, Tyumen Oblast, a selo in Kazansky Rural Okrug of Kazansky District of Tyumen Oblast
- Kazanskoye, Vagaysky District, Tyumen Oblast, a selo in Kazansky Rural Okrug of Vagaysky District of Tyumen Oblast
- Kazanskaya, Krasnodar Krai, a stanitsa in Kazansky Rural Okrug of Kavkazsky District of Krasnodar Krai
- Kazanskaya, Rostov Oblast, a stanitsa in Kazanskoye Rural Settlement of Verkhnedonskoy District of Rostov Oblast

== See also ==
- Kazan (disambiguation)
