= Darreh-ye Ghazan-e Sofla =

Village in South Khorasan, Iran

Darreh-ye Ghazan-e Sofla دره گزان سفلي
- Village
- Location within Iran
- Coordinates: 33°06′25″N 59°14′36″E
- Country: Iran
- Province: South Khorasan
- County: Birjand
- Bakhsh: Central
- Rural District: Alqurat

Population (2006)
  - Total: 70
- Time zone: UTC+3:30 (IRST)
  - Summer (DST): UTC+4:30 (IRDT)

Darreh-ye Ghazan-e Sofla (Persian: دره گزان سفلي, also Romanized as Darreh-ye Ghazān-e Soflá; also known as Darreh-ye Ghazān, Gazān, Darreh Gazān Pā’īn, Darreh-i-Gazān, and Darreh Jazān) is a village in Alqurat Rural District, in the Central District of Birjand County, South Khorasan Province, Iran. At the 2006 census, its population was 70, in 33 families.
