= 1951 Aradan Aeroflot An-2 crash =

1951 aviation incident

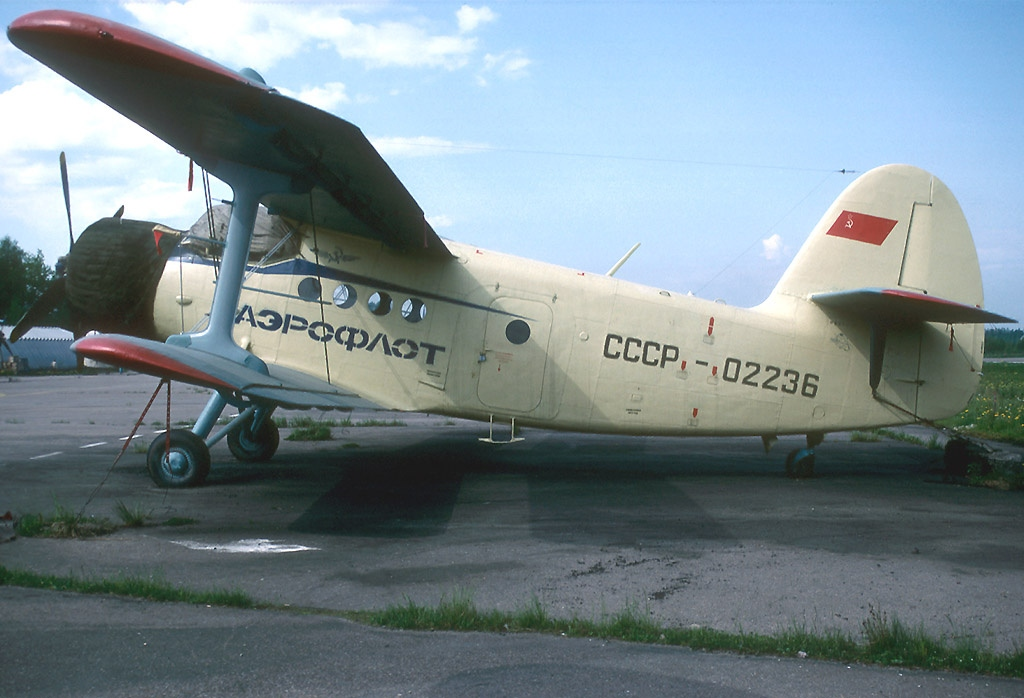
- An Antonov An-2 of Aeroflot

Accident
- Date: 21 April 1951
- Summary: Unexplained disappearance
- Site: Aradan Ridge, 25 km from Aradan (Russian Soviet Federative Socialist Republic, USSR)

Aircraft
- Aircraft type: Antonov An-2T
- Operator: Aeroflot
- Registration: СССР-А2597
- Flight origin: Kyzyl Airport, RSFSR
- Destination: Abakan Airport, RSFSR
- Crew: 4
- Missing: 4
- Survivors: 0

The 1951 Aradan Aeroflot An-2 crash was an aviation accident that occurred on 21 April 1951. An Antonov An-2 aircraft, operated by Aeroflot disappeared on a flight from Kyzyl to Abakan with four crew on board. The incident was the first fatal loss of the Antonov An-2. The aircraft's wreckage was not located until 2009 and was positively identified in 2019.

== Aircraft ==
The Antonov An-2 (registration number CCCP-A2597, serial number 10647307) had been manufactured on 28 January 1951. It was delivered to Aeroflot on 7 March of the same year. At the time of the crash the aircraft had logged a mere 102 flight hours.

== Flight ==
The An-2 took off from Kyzyl at 12:05 Moscow time on a cargo flight to Abakan with 485 kg (1,069 lb) of furs. The aircraft never arrived at Abakan; search and rescue operations were conducted but suspended a few days later as no trace of the aircraft nor the four crew were found.

== Crew ==
- Captain — Sergey Stepanovich Puzyryov
- First Officer — Leonid Filippovich Vasilyev
- Navigator — Vasily Ivanovich Medvedev
- Flight Engineer — Yuri Lukich Khmelnitsky

== Investigation ==
According to the findings of the investigation, the poor organization of the flight and inadequate management of the flight were highlighted as follows:

1) The aircraft was dispatched on a flight from Krasnoyarsk to Kyzyl outside of the schedule. The airports of Abakan and Kyzyl were not notified in time about this flight, its reception, servicing, and the aircraft involved.

- All four deceased crew members had never flown the Abakan-Kyzyl route before, even as operational passengers.
- The aircraft was dispatched from Abakan to Kyzyl and back according to a weather forecast that was below the established minimum.
- Premature termination of communication with the aircraft on the command radio station and failure to use it for flight management within hearing range.

2) Violation by Commander Puzyryov of §§ 84 and 256 NPP-47, resulting in the aircraft, flying in snowfall, potentially icing up (including carburetor icing) and crashing into a mountain during a forced descent with limited visibility. It was also considered that a landslide of rock and snow might have occurred.

3) Poor meteorological support for the flight was identified due to the following reasons:

- The weather forecast prepared by the Kyzyl AMSG did not predict wet snow, visibility up to 1 kilometer, and the covering of the Aradan Ridge by clouds.
- A storm warning from the Olenya Rechka meteorological station was transmitted to the Kyzyl airport's ADS only 39 minutes after it was received via telegraph, preventing the aircraft from returning to the airport.
- Lack of direct telephone communication between AMSG and the telegraph and poor interaction between the GMB and AMSG of Kyzyl.

== Findings in 2009 and 2019 ==
In August 2009, blogger Sergey Shishkin and his group filmed the wreckage of an An-2. The video shows landing gear struts, the engine, and parts of the fuselage. The video was uploaded to YouTube on 31 March 2016, titled “Aradan 2009. 10th day.” Shishkin was not able to identify the aircraft.

On 9 June 2019, a helicopter piloted by Alexey Kantsedalov rediscovered the wreckage at an altitude of 1,850 meters (200 meters from the landing site). Kantsedalov saw the remains of the aircraft and, recognizing the first digits of the registration number, confirmed that it was indeed CCCP-A2597:

Found the engine number, found the aircraft number. I mapped out a route for myself because I didn't know the exact spot. Yes, the Aviators' Pass, but it's just marked on the map. There are no coordinates, nothing. We flew with my son. We had a flight to Abakan, made a detour to Ergaki. We flew and found this place. We landed there, and by the engine number and the first two digits of the registration number, we were able to identify that it was indeed that aircraft. And then we started looking for the relatives.
