= Gazan, Sistan and Baluchestan =

Gazan گزان
- Village
- Country: Iran
- Province: Sistan and Baluchestan
- County: Dalgan
- Bakhsh: Jolgeh-ye Chah Hashem
- Rural District: Jolgeh-ye Chah Hashem

Population (2006)
  - Total: 39
- Time zone: UTC+3:30 (IRST)
  - Summer (DST): UTC+4:30 (IRDT)

Gazan (Persian: گزان, also Romanized as Qazān) is a village in Jolgeh-ye Chah Hashem Rural District, Jolgeh-ye Chah Hashem District, Dalgan County, Sistan and Baluchestan Province, Iran. At the 2006 census, its population was 39, in 10 families.
