= Qazan, Balkh =

- Location in Afghanistan
- Coordinates: 37°0′46″N 66°37′7″E
- Country: Afghanistan
- Province: Balkh Province
- Time zone: + 4.30

Qazan, Balkh is a village in Balkh Province in northern Afghanistan.

== See also ==
- Balkh Province
