= 1957 Kiev mid-air collision =

1957 aviation accident

Accident
- Date: 17 August 1957
- Summary: Mid-air collision
- Site: Kiev, Soviet Union
- Total fatalities: 15
- Total injuries: 23

First aircraft
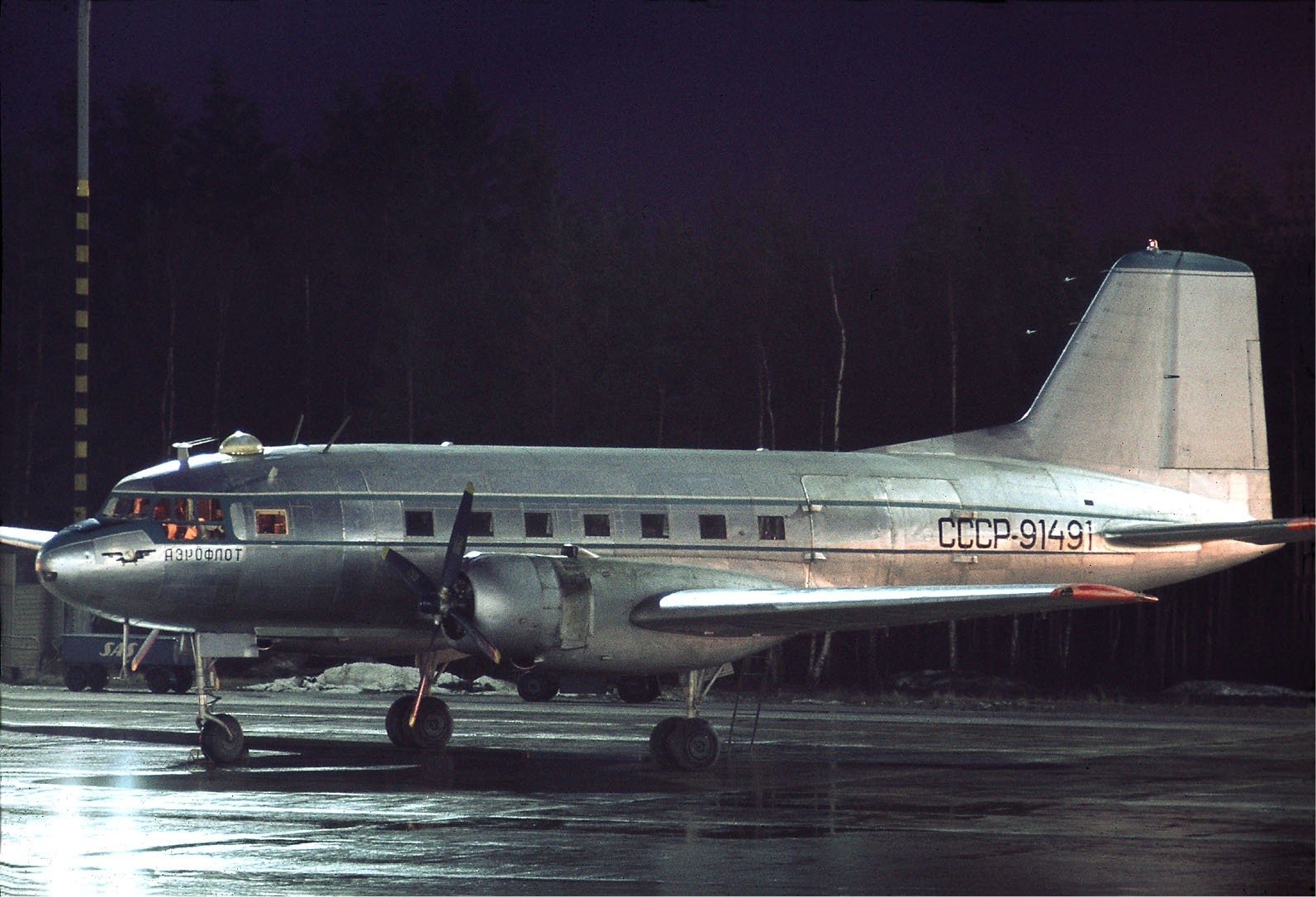
- A similar Il-14G to the one involved
- Type: Ilyushin Il-14G
- Operator: Aeroflot
- Registration: СССР-Л1360
- Flight origin: Kiev-Zhulyany Airport
- Destination: Kiev-Zhulyany Airport
- Crew: 4
- Fatalities: 4
- Survivors: 0

Second aircraft
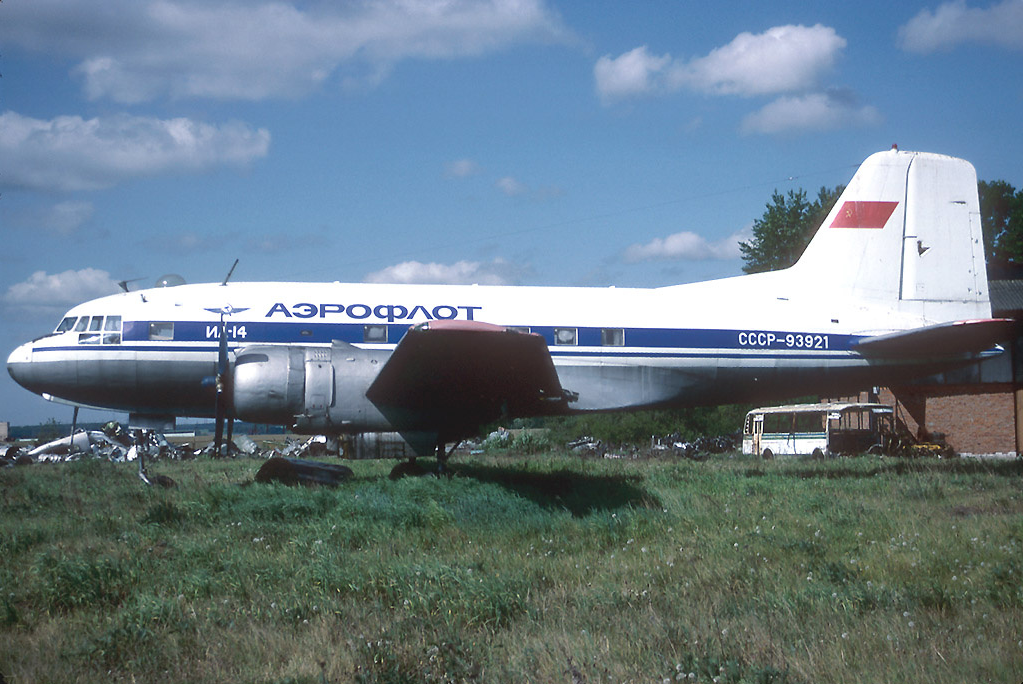
- A similar Il-14M to the one involved
- Type: Ilyushin Il-14M
- Operator: Aeroflot
- Registration: СССР-Л2071
- Flight origin: Sofia Airport
- Destination: Kiev-Zhulyany Airport
- Crew: 5
- Fatalities: 5
- Survivors: 0

Ground casualties
- Ground fatalities: 6
- Ground injuries: 23

The 1957 Kiev mid-air collision occurred on 17 August 1957 when two Ilyushin Il-14s collided over Kyiv (then spelled in English as "Kiev", using the Russian spelling), killing 15 people, including nine on both aircraft.

== Aircraft ==
СССР-Л1360 was a seven-month old Ilyushin Il-14G with factory number 147001432 and serial number 14-32. It had logged 157 flight hours. The Il-14 was being used in a training flight when the accident happened.

СССР-Л2071 was a seven-month old Ilyushin Il-14M (factory number 7342408, serial number 24-08). By the time of the accident, it had 833 flight hours. It operated a cargo service as Aeroflot Flight 126 from Sofia to Kiev, transporting the luggage of Chinese athletes.

== Accident ==
At 19:45, Flight 126 entered the Kiev-Zhulyany area at 900 m (3,000 ft). The crew contacted air traffic control and was instructed to approach the airport in a small circle. At the same time, СССР-Л1360 took off at approximately 19:54.

At 20:02, while Flight 126 was making a turn, the two aircraft collided at about 250–300 m (820–980 ft). The propeller of the Il-14M struck СССР-Л1360's right wing. The propellers went into the Il-14M's cockpit, cutting it off and killing the pilots. Both aircraft dived into the ground and crashed into several houses 4.5 km (2.8 mi; 2.4 nmi) from the airport.

All nine on board both aircraft along with six people on the ground were killed in the disaster. A further 23 were injured, 12 of them seriously.

== Investigation ==
The investigation determined the cause to be primarily ATC error, specifically the guidance and assistance of the air traffic controller at Kiev-Zhulyany Airport. Aeroflot Flight 126 was not told about the presence of another Il-14 performing training manoeuvres in the area. The crew members on both aircraft's lack of caution also contributed to the disaster.

== Aftermath ==
A memorial for the collision was installed by the son of pilot-in-command Sandler L. M. at their burial site.
