= Tsaghkashen, Gegharkunik =

Village in Gegharkunik, Armenia

Tsaghkashen Ծաղկաշեն
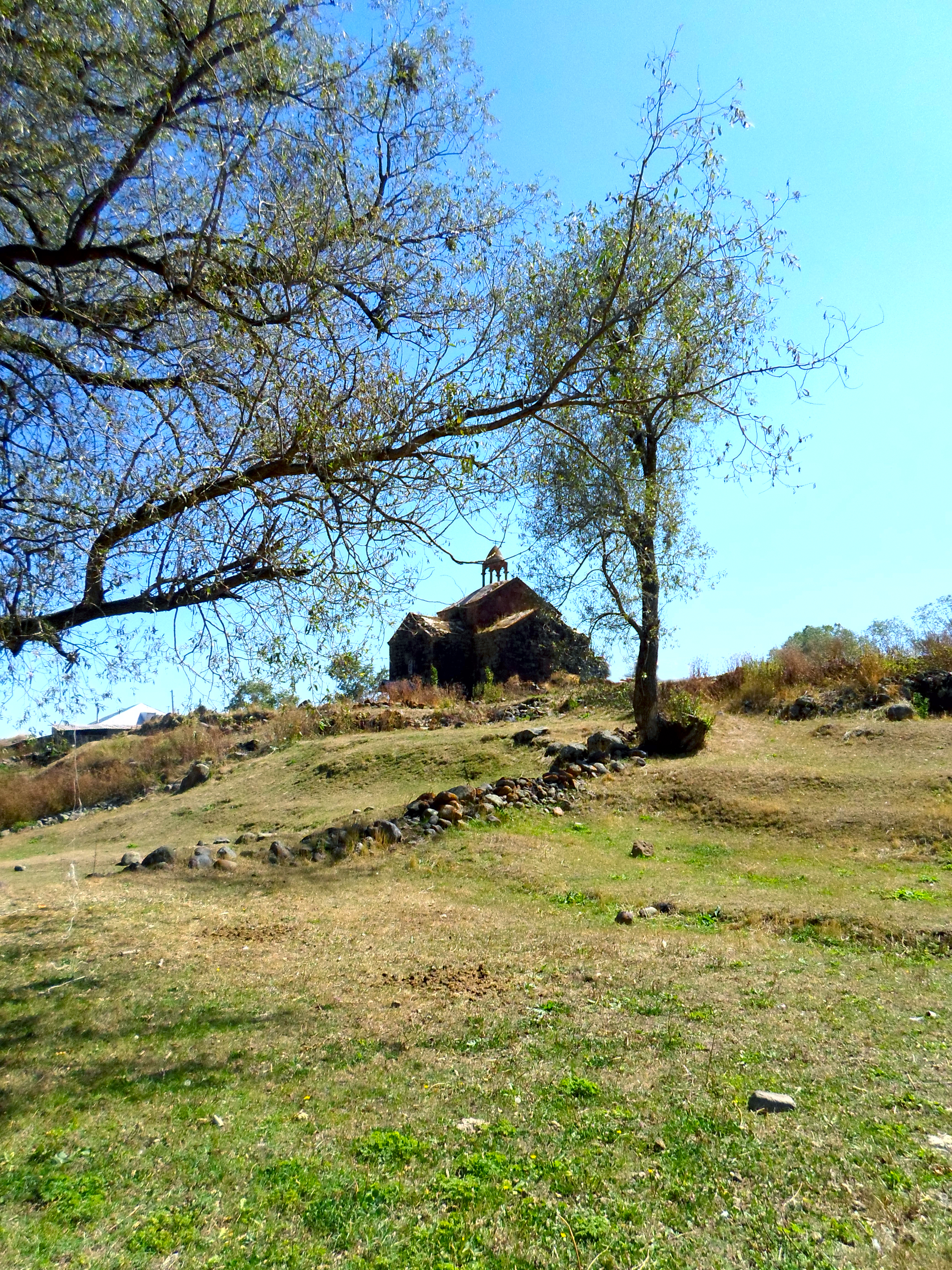
- St. Hovhannes Church in Tsaghkashen

- Location within Armenia Location within Gegharkunik
- Coordinates: 40°18′17″N 45°03′19″E
- Country: Armenia
- Province: Gegharkunik
- Municipality: Gavar

Population (2011)
  - Total: 470
- Time zone: UTC+4 (AMT)

Tsaghkashen (Armenian: Ծաղկաշեն) is a village in the Gavar Municipality of the Gegharkunik Province of Armenia.

== Etymology ==
The village was previously known as Kyarimkend.

== History ==
The village was founded in 1859. The village church dedicated to St. Hovhannes dates to the 9th-10th century.

== Gallery ==
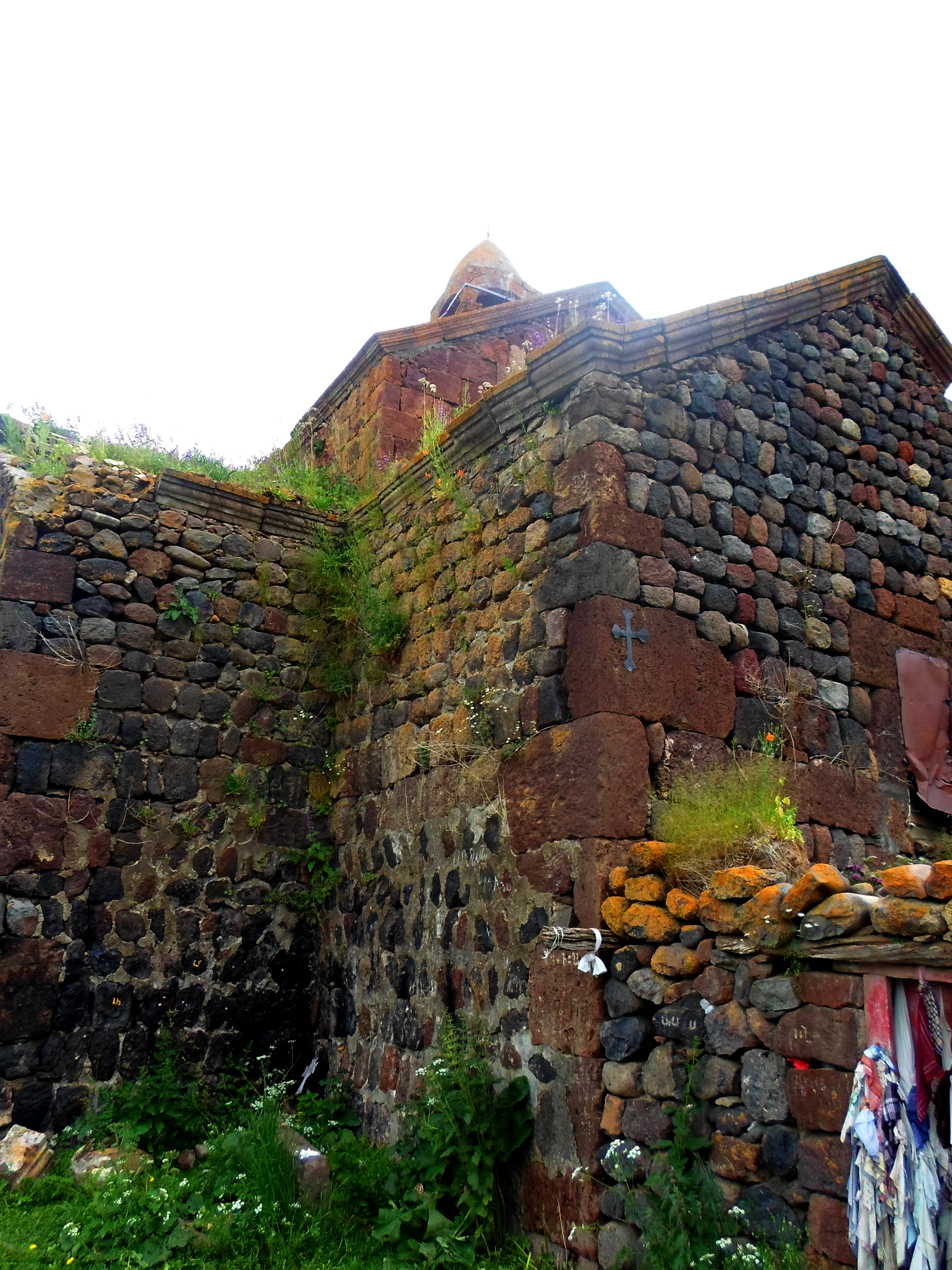
St. Hovhannes Church

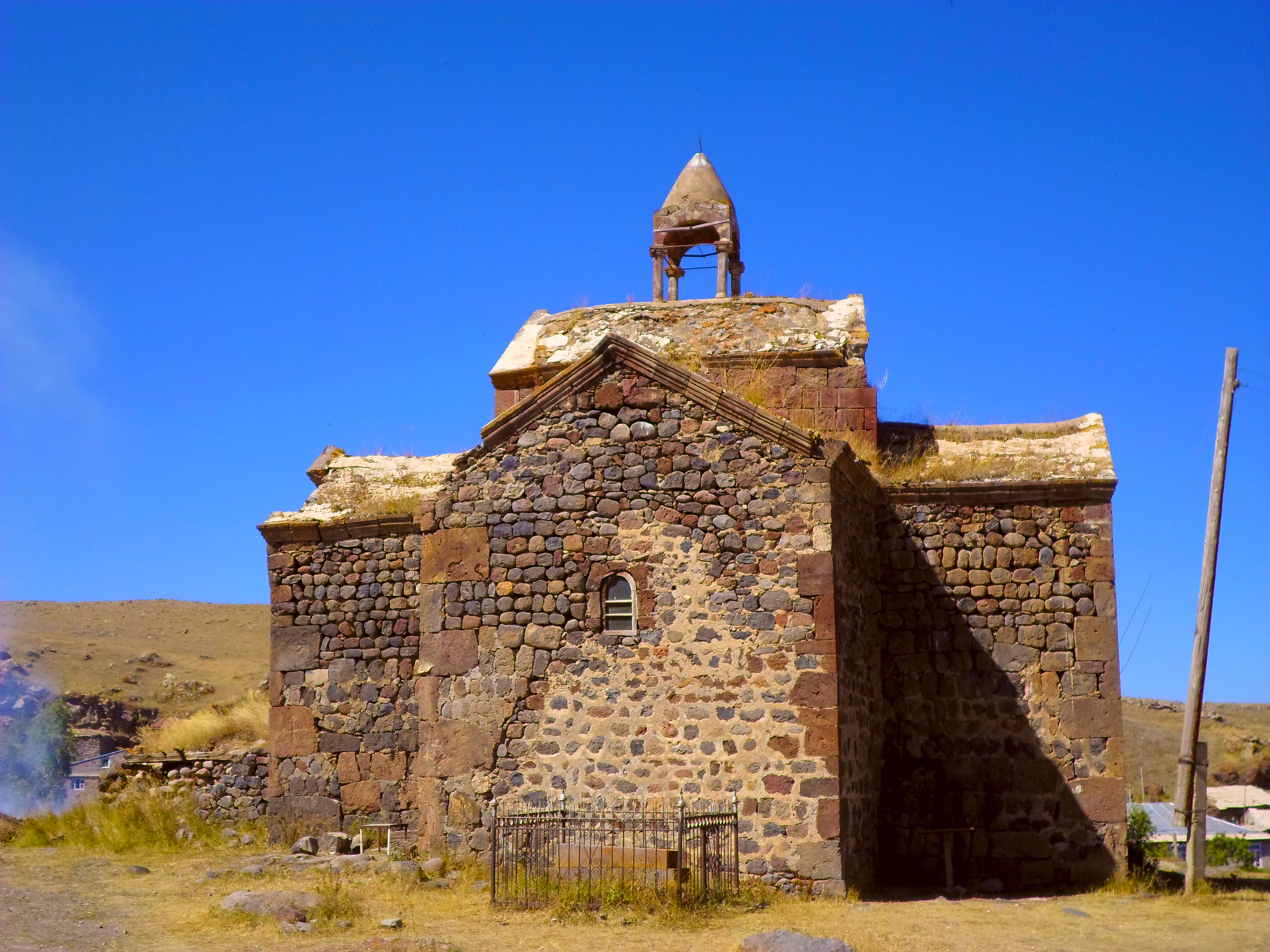
St. Hovhannes Church

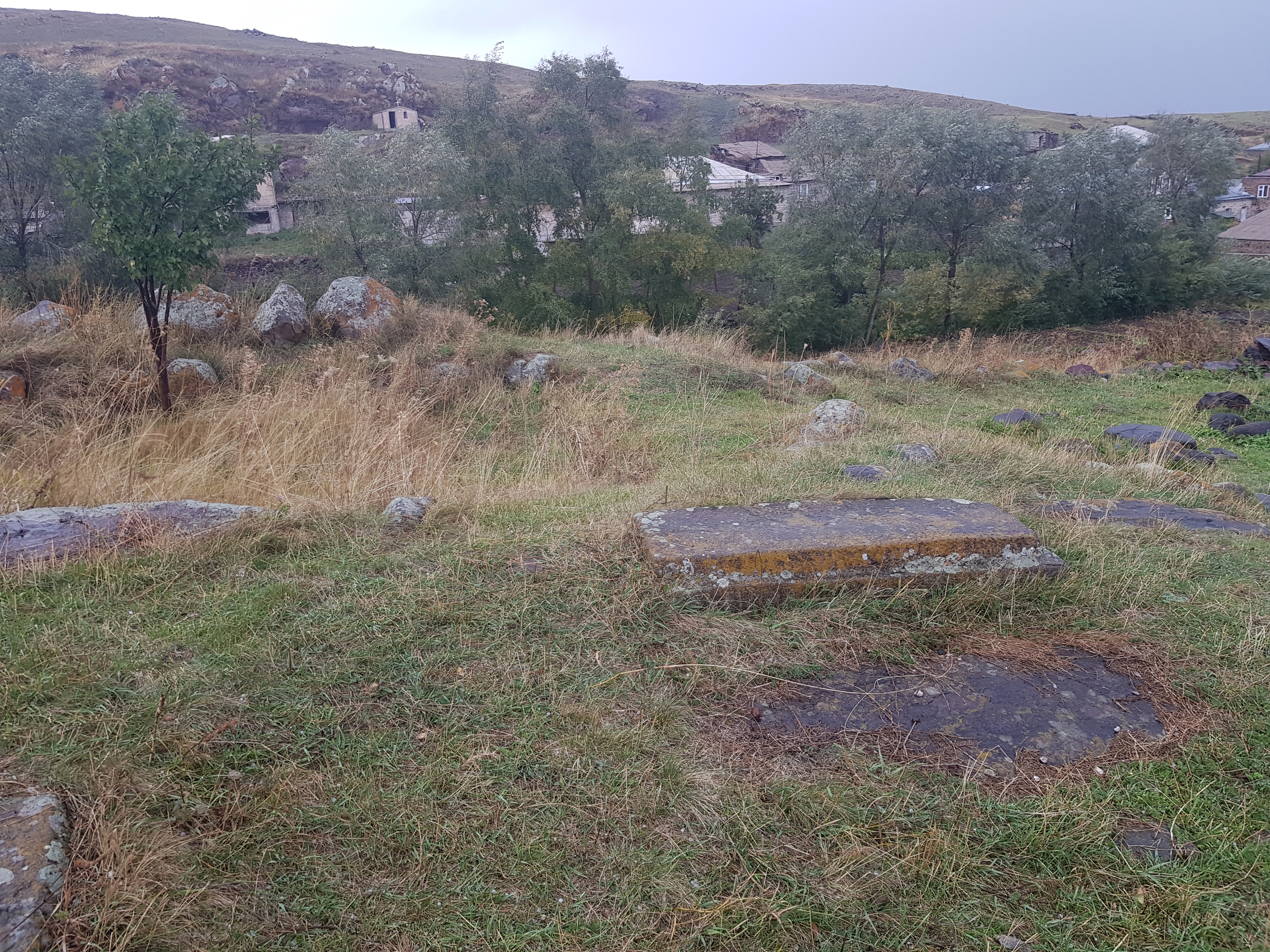
Cemetery near St. Hovhannes Church

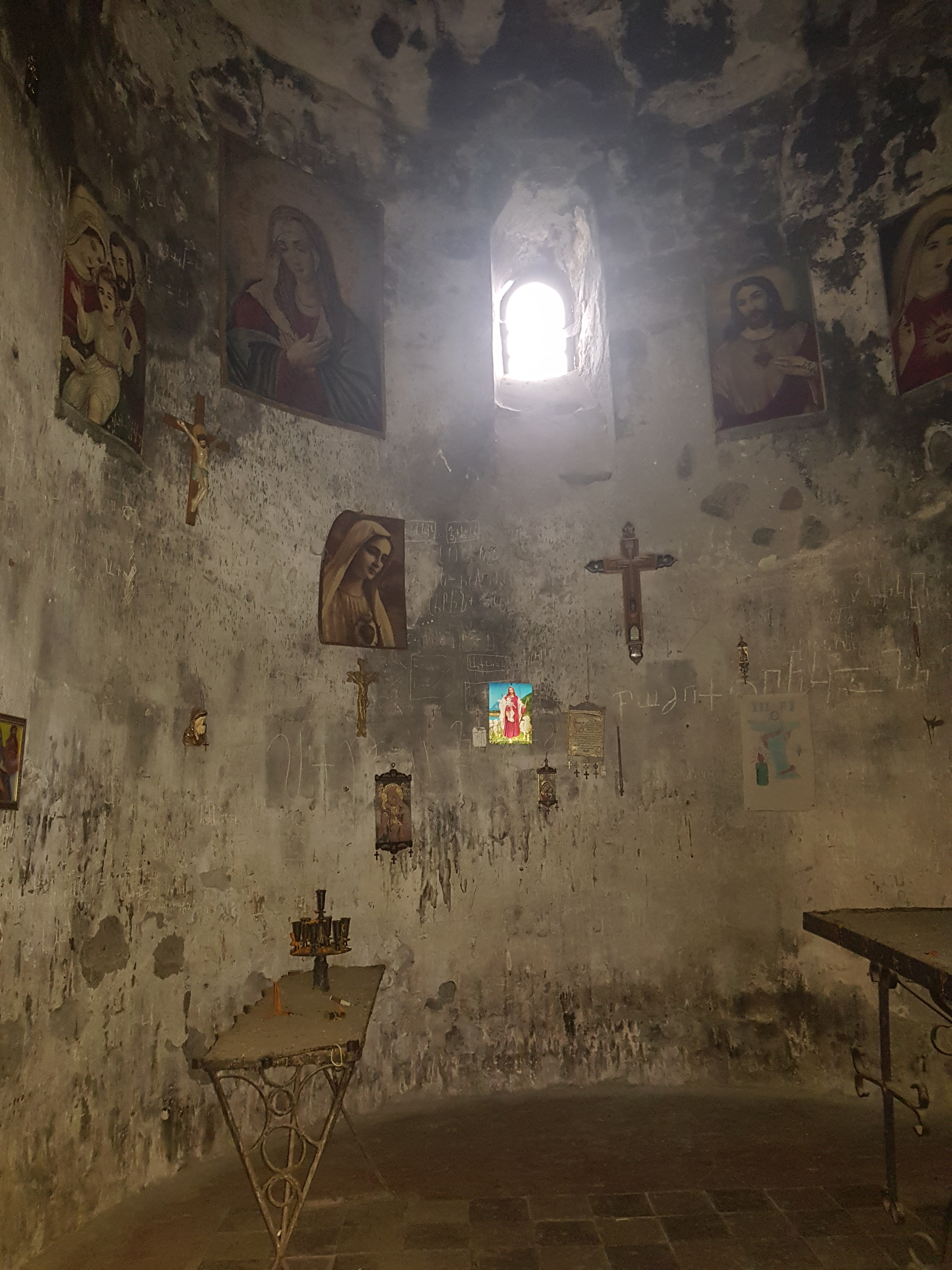
St. Hovhannes Church interior
