= Qazan, Iran =

Qazan قازان
- Village
- Location within Iran
- Coordinates: 36°06′37″N 45°27′39″E
- Country: Iran
- Province: West Azerbaijan
- County: Sardasht
- Bakhsh: Central
- Rural District: Baryaji

Population (2006)
  - Total: 33
- Time zone: UTC+3:30 (IRST)
  - Summer (DST): UTC+4:30 (IRDT)

Qazan (Persian: قازان, also Romanized as Qāzān) is a village in Baryaji Rural District, in the Central District of Sardasht County, West Azerbaijan Province, Iran. At the 2006 census, its population was 33, in 11 families.
