= Jazan, Isfahan =

Jazan جزن
- Village
- Location within Iran
- Coordinates: 33°33′17″N 51°58′41″E
- Country: Iran
- Province: Isfahan
- County: Natanz
- Bakhsh: Central
- Rural District: Karkas

Population (2006)
  - Total: 53
- Time zone: UTC+3:30 (IRST)
  - Summer (DST): UTC+4:30 (IRDT)

Jazan (Persian: جزن; also known as Gazan) is a village in Karkas Rural District, in the Central District of Natanz County, Isfahan Province, Iran. At the 2006 census, its population was 53, in 27 families. Among these 53 individuals are 29 women and 24 men; 6 of the women and 20 of the men are literate.
