= Gazan-e Sofla =

Village in Kurdistan, Iran

Gazan-e Sofla گزان سفلي
- Village
- Location within Iran
- Coordinates: 35°33′54″N 47°03′46″E
- Country: Iran
- Province: Kurdistan
- County: Sanandaj
- Bakhsh: Central
- Rural District: Hoseynabad-e Jonubi

Population (2006)
  - Total: 137
- Time zone: UTC+3:30 (IRST)
  - Summer (DST): UTC+4:30 (IRDT)

Gazan-e Sofla (Persian: گزان سفلي, also Romanized as Gazān-e Soflá; also known as Gazān-e Pā’īn, Kazan-e Kūchek, and Qajān) is a village in Hoseynabad-e Jonubi Rural District, in the Central District of Sanandaj County, Kurdistan Province, Iran. At the 2006 census, its population was 137, in 43 families. The village is populated by Kurds.
