= Our Lady of Kazan Orthodox Cathedral =

- Catedral Ortodoxa Nuestra Señora de Kazán (in Spanish)
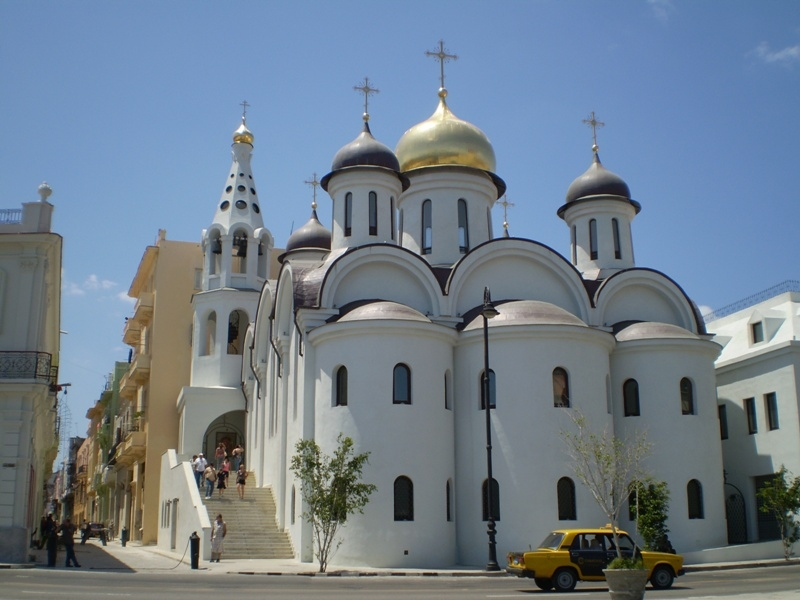
- The cathedral
- Our Lady of Kazan Orthodox Cathedral
- 23°08′5.80″N 82°20′49.87″W
- Location: Old Havana, Havana
- Country: Cuba
- Denomination: Russian Orthodox Church
- Website: www.orthodoxcuba.com

History
- Dedication: Our Lady of Kazan
- Consecrated: October 19, 2008

Architecture
- Architect: Alexey Vorontsov
- Architectural type: Cathedral
- Style: Byzantine
- Groundbreaking: November 14, 2004

Administration
- Diocese: Russian Orthodox Church, Office of foreign institutions of the Moscow Patriarchate

Clergy
- Archbishop: Vladimir Klyuyev

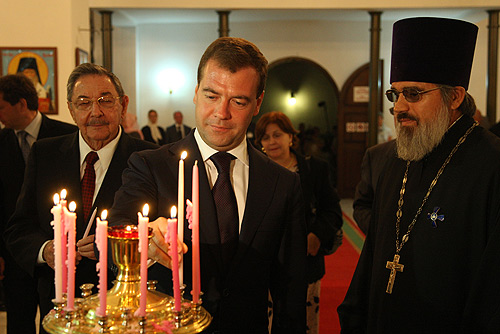
Raúl Castro, Dmitry Medvedev and Archpriest Vladimir Klyuyev of the Kazan Cathedral in Havana

The Our Lady of Kazan Orthodox Cathedral (Spanish: Catedral Ortodoxa Nuestra Señora de Kazán) (Russian: Православный Собор Богоматери Казанской Transliteration: Pravoslavnyj Sobor Bogomateri Kazanskoj), is a Russian Orthodox cathedral located in historic old town of Havana, Cuba, under the jurisdiction of the Russian Orthodox Church.

The temple was built on the shores of Havana Harbour in Old Havana, on the corner of San Pedro Ave. and Santa Clara.

== History ==
The first service of the Russian Orthodox Church in Cuba began in 2001. At first they were held in the Russian trade delegation, then at the embassy, and later in the Catholic church.

=== Construction of the Temple ===
The first agreement for the project dates back to 2002. Starting then, preparations began for the work, whose construction was initiated on November 14, 2004, at the initiative of Cuban leader Fidel Castro, who, according to his memoirs, "offered to build the Cathedral of Russian Orthodox Church in the capital of Cuba as a monument to Russian-Cuban friendship".

The first stone of the temple was laid in November 2004 by Metropolitan Kirill of Smolensk and Kaliningrad, (since 2009 the Patriarch of Moscow and all Rus', and Primate of the Russian Orthodox Church) following an agreement by the Cuban authorities with the Russian Orthodox Church. The project was developed by architect Alexey Vorontsov and approved by the official historian of Havana, Eusebio Leal, who travelled to Moscow to discuss the matter and met with Patriarch Alexy II of Moscow. Foreman construction was the Cuban engineer Pedro Rodriguez Sanchez.

The construction was carried on means of the Cuban authorities, with the participation of a multidisciplinary team of designers, investors, architects; civil, electrical, hydraulic and mechanical engineers; and workers from the Office of the City of Havana Historian and other entities in the country, as was agreed with the Russian ecclesial authorities.

=== Architecture ===
From Moscow, had been delivered some elements of decoration of the temple (the dome, the floor covering) and the church plate.

Built in the style of a composition of types of circular towers, the cathedral is crowned by an imposing central golden cupola, surrounded another four smaller copper-colored ones, all the shape of an onion bulb and integrated into a Byzantine structure.

The cathedral was built based on traditional materials such as concrete and bricks. It comprises three works: church, diocese and bell tower. The pieces of the six cupolas (five in the church and another in the bell tower) were brought to the Cuban capital from Russia and were installed by local specialists.

The temple's first floor is set aside for administrative areas, the father's rooms, public bathroom, kitchen, meeting room, computer room and technical area. Meanwhile, the top floor houses the church as such, with capacity for approximately 500 persons, which is accessed through two granite stairways.

The principal entrance is through San Pedro Street and the back part of the temple, the back of the altar, through Avenida del Puerto. The Cathedral takes up an area of 1,200 meters facing the bay of Havana.

== Consecration of the Cathedral ==
The church was consecrated October 19, 2008 in a ceremony ministered by Metropolitan Kirill Gundyaev in the presence of Heads of State of Cuba Raúl Castro and hundreds of Orthodox believers, including employees of the Russian embassy in Havana and missions.

The temple in Havana was conceived and built as a monument to Russian-Cuban friendship, as an expression of gratitude to our people, who made an enormous contribution to the preservation of Cuba as an independent state in developing its economic potential.

— Metropolitan Kirill Gundyaev, Patriarch of Moscow and all Rus'
