= Kazanka (Bagansky District) =

Village in Novosibirsk Oblast, Russia

Kazanka Казанка
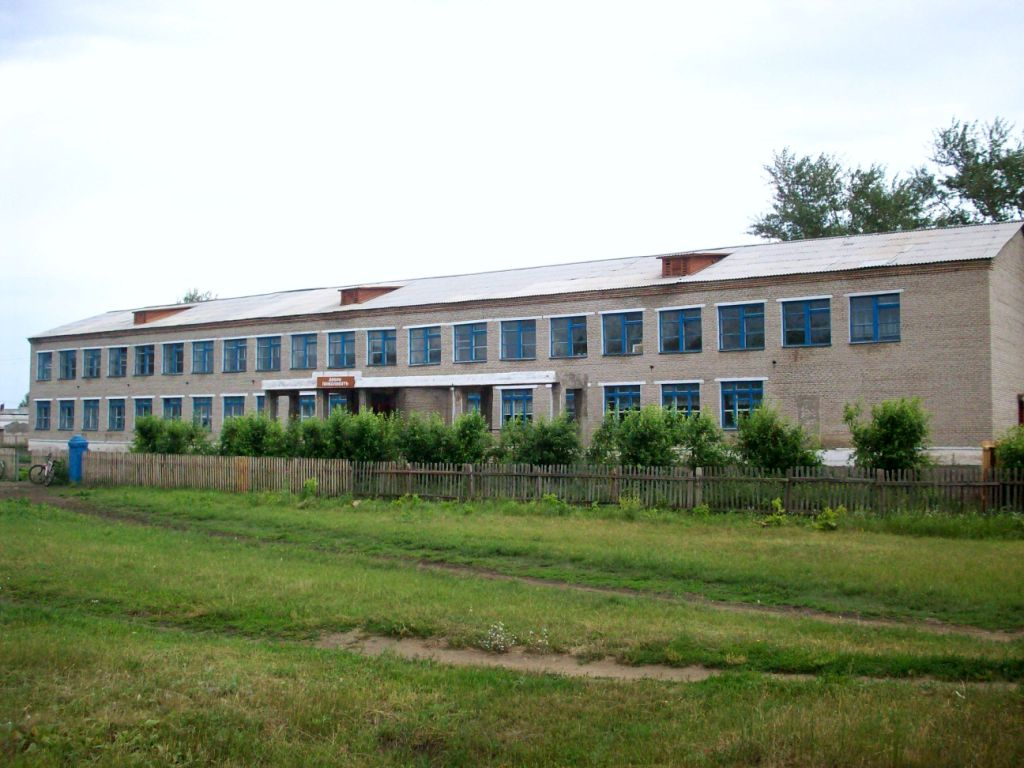
- Kazanka secondary school.

- Location within Novosibirsk Oblast Location within Russia
- Coordinates: 53°59′05″N 77°25′40″E
- Country: Russia
- Region: Novosibirsk Oblast
- District: Bagansky District
- Village Council: Kazan Village Council
- Time zone: UTC+7:00
- Postcode: 632786

Kazanka (Russian: Казанка) is a rural locality (a selo). It is the administrative center of the Kazan Village Council of Bagansky District, Novosibirsk Oblast, Russia. Population: 629 (2010 census); 684 (2002 census);
