= Kazan-2 Airport =

Airport in Kazan, Tatarstan, Russia

Kazan-2 Казань-2
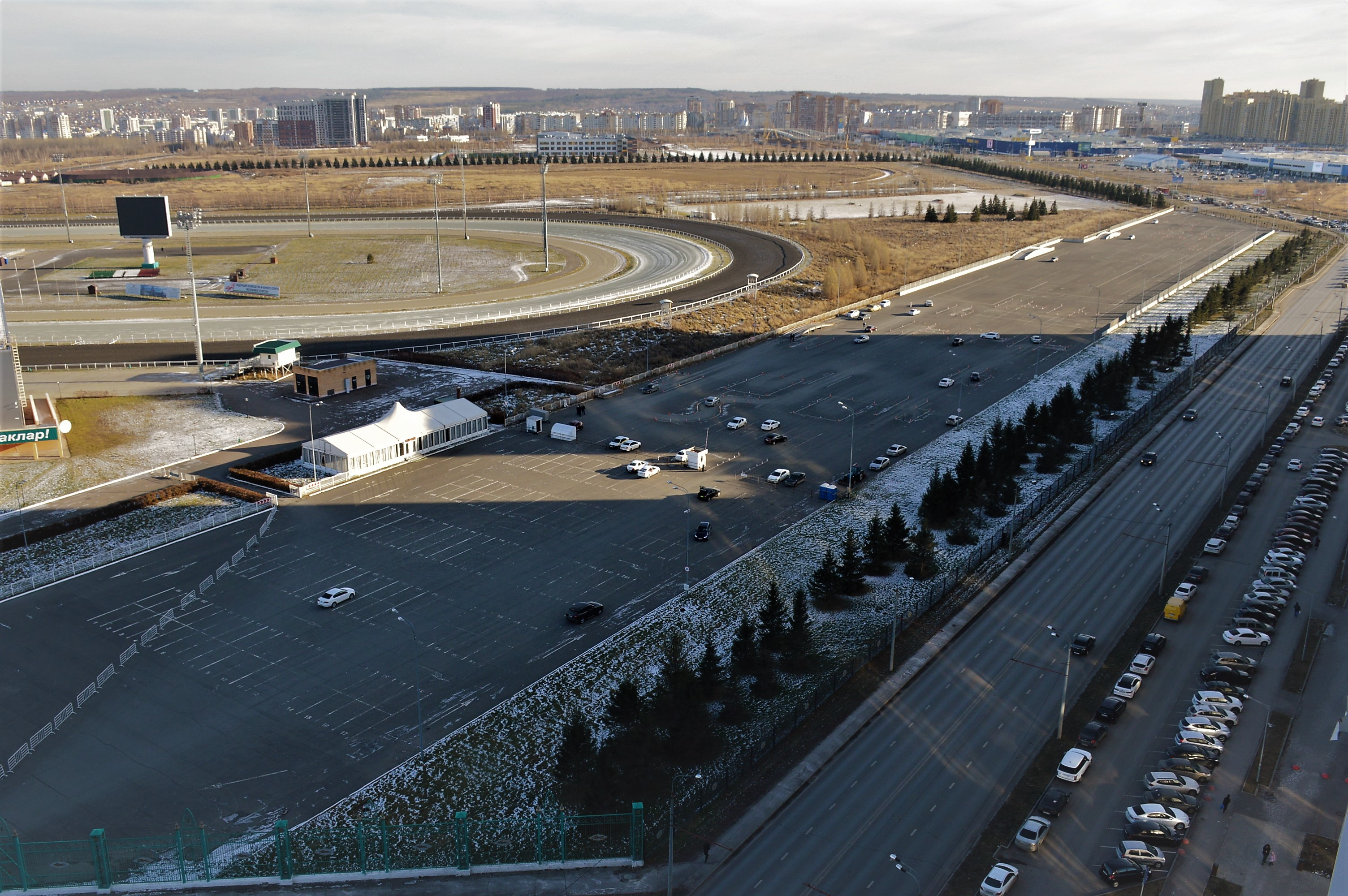
- Aerial view of Kazan-2 airport
- IATA: none; ICAO: none

Summary
- Airport type: Public
- Location: Kazan
- Elevation AMSL: 394 ft / 120 m
- Coordinates: 55°47′15″N 049°11′43″E
- Interactive map of Kazan-2

Runways
Direction	Length		Surface
Direction	ft	m	Surface
	10,360	3,160	Concrete

Kazan-2 was a regional airport in Kazan, Tatarstan, Russia, in service from 1979 until the late 1980s. Passenger service was provided by Antonov An-2s and Let L-410 small aircraft and a few helicopters.

An old airfield for Kazan's major airport (situated outside city limits) was likely built during the World War II era. The airport was located eight kilometres (5.0 mi) northeast of the city centre, and has since been replaced by civilian construction, such as the residential development 'Kazan - 21st Century', Azure Skies (one of the tallest buildings in Kazan) and the largest international hippodrome in Russia. Although the airport is gone, the surrounding neighborhood still carries the name 'Old Airport' (tat. İske Aeroport, rus. Старый Аэропорт).
