= Aeroflot Flight 365 =

1958 aircraft hijacking

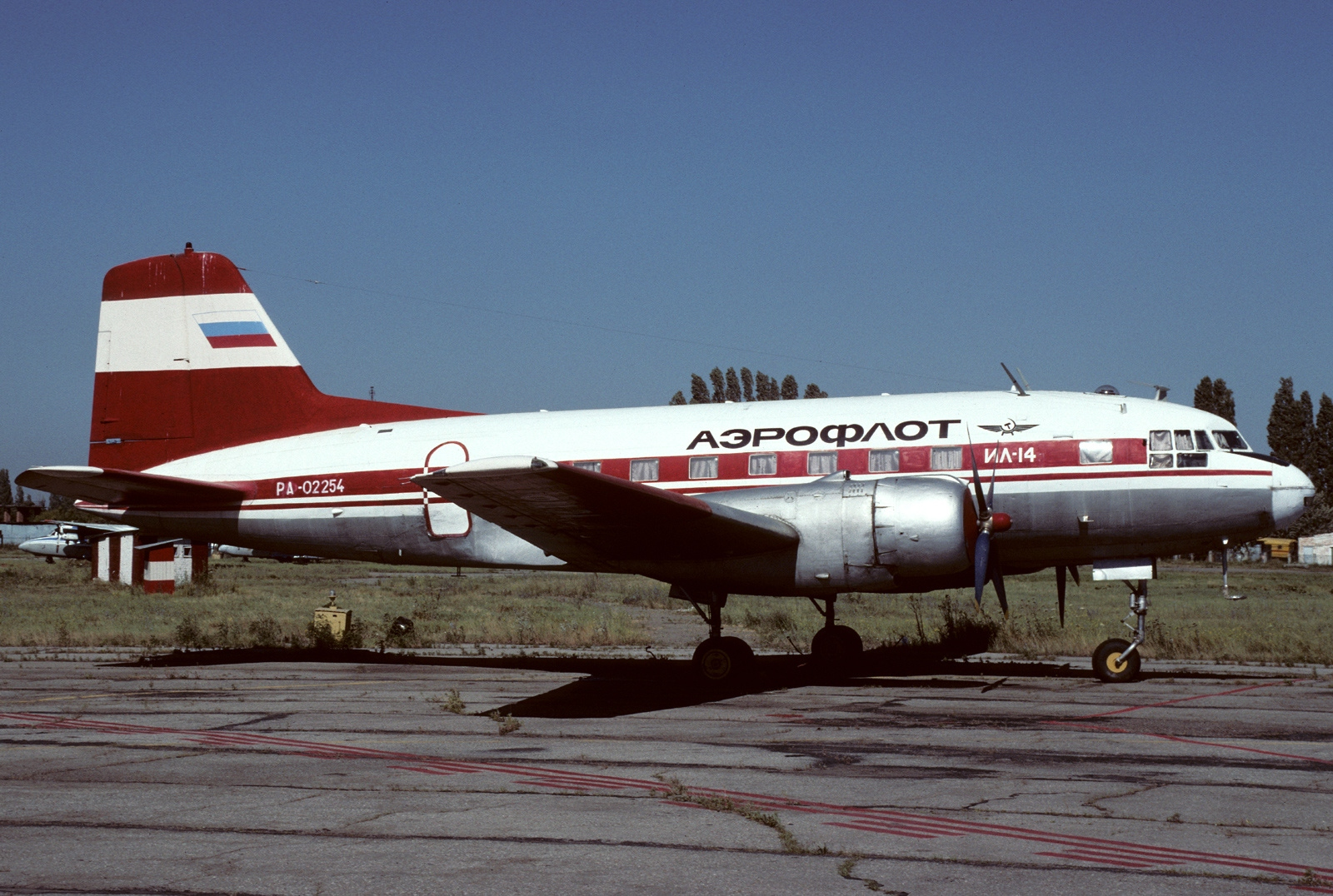
- An Ilyushin Il-14, similar to the aircraft involved in the hijacking

Hijacking
- Date: 5 September 1958
- Summary: Attempted hijacking
- Site: Jõhvi, Estonian SSR

Aircraft
- Aircraft type: Avia 14P
- Operator: Aeroflot
- Registration: СССР-Л2048
- Flight origin: Shosseynaya Airport, Leningrad, USSR
- Destination: Ülemiste Airport, Tallinn, USSR
- Passengers: 11
- Crew: 6
- Fatalities: 1
- Survivors: 16

Aeroflot Flight 365 was a domestic passenger flight from Shosseynaya Airport to Ülemiste Airport. On 5 September 1958, the aircraft operating the route was hijacked and made an emergency landing at Jõhvi. All occupants, except for the hijacker, managed to evacuate before the fuselage burned out.

== Aircraft ==
The aircraft was an Avia 14P with registration СССР-Л2048 and serial number 705101, manufactured on 30 December 1957. It served briefly with Aeroflot's Ukrainian division before it was transferred to the Estonian division on 21 January 1958. By the time of the hijacking, the plane had logged 1,195 flight hours.

The pilot-in-command was Daniil Danilovich Vlasov, the co-pilot was Valentin Georgievich Platonov, the flight engineer was Pyotr Vasilyevich Bryzgalov, the wireless operator was Anatoly Petrovich Umnov, the navigator was Mark Mikhailovich Martynenko, and the flight attendant was Pilvi Albertona Kaarits.

== Hijacking ==
Flight 365 departed Leningrad normally. Thirty minutes after takeoff, over the Narva area, a passenger gave the flight attendant a note. In the note, the hijacker ordered the pilot to come out and "speak with a group of interested passengers", otherwise he threatened to kill the crew. Kaarits took the note to Vlasov.

After reading the note, Vlasov locked the door and prepared a pistol. After one to two minutes, sounds of gunshots or explosions were heard in the cabin and the hijacker attempted to break down the cockpit door. The crew radioed ATC about the attack and intended to make an emergency landing at Jõhvi Airport. Vlasov fired some shots at the door and gave the pistol to Bryzgalov. Another explosion damaged the door. Bryzgalov shot at the hijacker until he was out of ammunition. The passenger used homemade explosives, causing the aircraft to explode and catch fire.

The crew then began a steep descent to 900 m (3,000 ft) and landed at Jõhvi. All occupants but the hijacker managed to evacuate in time before the plane burned out, although Vlasov broke his back while escaping via the astrodome. Despite firefighting efforts, the aircraft burned out almost completely.
