= Gazan-e Olya =

Gazan-e Olya گزان عليا
- Village
- Location within Iran
- Coordinates: 35°36′25″N 47°02′03″E
- Country: Iran
- Province: Kurdistan
- County: Sanandaj
- Bakhsh: Central
- Rural District: Hoseynabad-e Jonubi

Population (2006)
  - Total: 359
- Time zone: UTC+3:30 (IRST)
  - Summer (DST): UTC+4:30 (IRDT)

Gazan-e Olya (Persian: گزان عليا, also Romanized as Gazān-e ‘Olyā; also known as Gazān-e Bālā, Ghazān, Ghazvin, Qāzān, Qazan-e ‘Olyā, and Qazzān) is a village in Hoseynabad-e Jonubi Rural District, in the Central District of Sanandaj County, Kurdistan Province, Iran. At the 2006 census, its population was 359, in 79 families. The village is populated by Kurds.
