= List of accidents and incidents involving the Ilyushin Il-14 =

Ilyushin Il-14s and Avia 14s had 133 incidents and accidents during their operational history.

== 1950s ==
31 December 1954
An Aeroflot Il-14 crashed on takeoff from Irkutsk Airport, killing all 17 on board.

6 August 1955
Aeroflot Flight 214, an Il-14P (CCCP-Л5057), crashed on approach to Voronezh Airport following wing separation due to an engine fire, killing all 25 on board.

22 April 1956
Aeroflot Flight 227, an Il-14P (CCCP-Л1718), crashed in the Black Sea shortly after takeoff from Sukhumi Airport for reasons unknown, killing all six on board.

28 October 1956
As part of Operation Tarnegol, Egyptian Air Force Il-14 1101 was shot down by an Israeli Air Force Gloster Meteor in an attempt to kill the Egyptian general staff, killing all 16 on board; it was later determined that the Egyptian Chief of Staff was not on board.

18 November 1956
An Aeroflot Il-14 (CCCP-Л5658) bounced several times following a hard landing at Irkutsk Airport, killing one of five on board; the aircraft was written off and used for spare parts.

26 April 1957
Bulgarian Air Force Il-14 051 crashed into a hillside on approach to Varna Airport after it deviated from the approach pattern in poor visibility, killing the six crew.

14 June 1957
LOT Polish Airlines Flight 232, an Il-14P (SP-LNF), crashed on approach to Vnukovo Airport in bad weather due to pilot error, killing nine of 13 on board.

15 August 1957
Aeroflot Flight 103, an Il-14P (CCCP-Л1874), crashed in Copenhagen harbor after it struck a power plant chimney on approach, killing all 23 on board.

17 August 1957
Two Aeroflot Il-14s (CCCP-Л2071 and CCCP-Л1360) collided over Kiev, Ukraine due to crew and ATC errors, killing all nine on board both aircraft; the wreckage of CCCP-Л2071 crashed onto two houses, killing six people.

30 August 1957
An Aeroflot Il-14D (CCCP-Л1440) crashed into a hill near Slovita, Ukraine, killing all seven on board. Because of poor visibility, the crew were using a road as a visual reference, but had missed a curve in the road. While attempting to return to the road the aircraft crashed.

4 November 1957
A Romanian Government Il-14P (YR-PCC) struck trees in fog and crashed while on approach to Vnukovo Airport, killing four of 16 on board; former Romanian Foreign Minister Grigore Preoteasa was among the dead, while future dictator Nicolae Ceaușescu survived.

2 December 1957
An Aeroflot Il-14M (CCCP-Л1657) overran the runway on landing at Vantaa Airport and came to rest on a road; all 21 on board survived.

5 April 1958
A CAAC Il-14 (632) struck a mountain while on approach to Xi'an, killing all 14 on board. The aircraft was flying too low during the approach; the pilot had a history of descending too low despite others' attempts to stop him.

5 September 1958
A man hijacked Aeroflot Flight 365 (an Avia 14P, CCCP-Л2048) 30 minutes after takeoff from Leningrad. The hijacker handed a note to a flight attendant demanding the pilot talk to a group of passengers while also threatening to kill the crew. The pilot read the note and then locked himself in the cockpit and armed himself with a pistol. The hijacker attempted to break into the cockpit; the crew radioed about the attack and that they were diverting to Jõhvi. The pilot opened fire with one shot and then slid the pistol to the mechanic who continued firing until the pistol ran out of ammo. The hijacker's actions had also started a fire on board; the crew began a descent and landed the aircraft in flames at the airport; the aircraft burned out, killing the hijacker.

7 September 1958
Aeroflot Flight 164, an Il-14P (CCCP-Л1692) crashed in a field near Constantine, Kazakhstan due to loss of control following a lightning strike, killing all 27 on board.

7 November 1958
Aeroflot Flight 667, an Avia 14P (CCCP-52024), crashed into a cliff at Privetnoye, Ukraine while descending for Simferopol, killing all 12 on board. The aircraft was off course by 25 km (16 mi) due to poor visibility and radio problems.

7 December 1958
Aeroflot Flight 213, an Il-14M (CCCP-Л2096), struck trees and crashed while on approach to Stalingrad Airport in bad weather, killing one of 24 on board.

15 December 1958
An Aeroflot Il-14P (CCCP-41843) crashed near Baratayevka Airport after entering a descent during a training flight, killing four of seven crew.

23 December 1958
Aeroflot Flight 466, an Il-14M (CCCP-61663), stalled and crashed while attempting a go-around at Yuzhny Airport, killing all 21 on board.

30 December 1958
A Polyarnya Aviatsiya Il-14M (CCCP-04196) crashed into the side of a hill 41 mi from Hatanga after the crew began descending too soon following a deviation from the flight route, killing 16 of 17 on board.

18 January 1959
Aeroflot Flight 205, an Il-14P (CCCP-41863), lost control and crashed near Stalingrad while on approach, killing all 25 on board; the cause was not determined, but an accidental shootdown was blamed as several round holes were found in the flight deck.

23 October 1959
Aeroflot Flight 200, an Il-14P (CCCP-41806), crashed on approach to Vnukovo Airport after descending too soon as a result of pilot error due to crew fatigue, killing 28 of 29 on board.

13 December 1959
Aeroflot Flight 120, an Il-14P (CCCP-91577), struck a mountain 17 mi northeast of Boysun after intentionally deviating from the flight route, killing all 30 on board. Soviet authorities did not acknowledge the accident until 19 January 1960 and wreckage was found on 2 June 1960.

== 1960s ==
30 March 1960
Czechoslovak Air Force Avia 14T 3149 struck a hill near Kromeriz, Czech Republic in poor visibility, killing the seven crew.

10 June 1960
Aeroflot Flight 207, an Il-14P (CCCP-91571), struck the slope of Mount Rech (near Tkvarcheli) after the crew deviated from the flight route, killing all 31 on board.

20 July 1960
Aeroflot Flight 613, an Il-14M (CCCP-61696), crashed 63 mi from Syktyvkar after it broke up in mid-air due to severe turbulence in a thunderstorm, killing all 23 on board.

22 July 1960
East German Army VEB 14P 400 crashed at Vockerode after hitting a power plant chimney while flying too low, killing the six crew and one person on the ground.

2 September 1960
An Aeroflot Il-14M (CCCP-04200) struck the side of Mount Belaya in bad weather, killing all 18 on board. The aircraft was already flying too low 20 km (12 mi) from the crash site.

26 September 1960
Aeroflot Flight 607, an Il-14M (CCCP-41866), overran the runway on landing at Brest Airport following engine failure, killing one of 27 on board.

30 October 1960
An Aeroflot Avia 14P (CCCP-52025) crashed shortly after takeoff from Penza Airport due to possible icing, killing the five crew.

25 November 1960
An Aeroflot Il-14FK (CCCP-91610) crashed near Shosseynaya Airport after the crew became disorientated during a training flight, killing all nine on board.

4 December 1960
Aeroflot Flight 81, an Il-14M (CCCP-52091), crashed near Chernovo due to wing separation after pulling out of a descent following an engine fire, killing all 14 on board.

6 December 1960
An Egyptian Air Force Il-14 crashed 40 mi north of Luxor after an apparent in-flight fire, killing all 17 on board.

15 December 1960
PLAAF Il-14 4102, of the 13th Division, 39th Regiment, crashed at Changsha shortly after takeoff, killing eight.

19 December 1960
Bulgarian Air Force Il-14 81 crashed near Vakerel while on approach to Sofia after descending below the glide path, killing the five crew.

2 January 1961
A CSA Czechoslovak Airlines Avia 14-32A (OK-MCZ) crashed shortly after takeoff during a training flight from Ruzyně International Airport after failing to gain sufficient altitude on takeoff, killing all 10 on board.

23 January 1961
Aeroflot Flight 95, an Avia 14(P) (CCCP-61610), crashed short of the runway in poor visibility at Dnepropetrovsk (now Dnipro) after it descended below the glide path due to poor CRM; all 34 on board survived.

27 January 1961
A CSA Czechoslovak Airlines Avia 14-32A (OK-MCV) was hijacked by three boys who demanded to be flown to Munich. The oldest hijacker opened fire and the second one repeatedly stabbed the navigator. With the help of two passengers, the three hijackers surrendered following a fight in the cockpit. The aircraft returned to Prague where the hijackers were arrested. One of the hijackers, a 15-year-old attempting to escape his abusive father, received a 10 year prison sentence, but was released after serving 7 years following a plea from the president.

30 January 1961
An Aeroflot Il-14 (CCCP-41858) crashed at Stalingrad during a training flight due to crew errors, killing one of four on board. The instructor had reduced the power of the left engine without informing the crew, which was against procedure. The pilot mistook the loss of engine power for an engine failure, feathering the propeller and shutting the engine down. The aircraft then banked left and crashed.

5 June 1961
An Aeroflot Il-14G (CCCP-61732) struck trees and crashed on the side of Mount Cherskogo some 11 km (6.8 mi) short of the runway at Kadala Airport after the crew began descending too soon, killing the five crew.

8 July 1961
Aeroflot Flight 411, an Il-14P (CCCP-41848), crashed at Sosnovy Bor while attempting a forced landing following loss of power and fuel exhaustion, killing nine of 26 on board. The crew had failed to add 550 L (150 US gal) of fuel at Kazan before takeoff.

31 October 1961
An Aeroflot Il-14M (CCCP-61712) struck a hillside near Smorodinny after the crew mistook the lights of Smorodinny for the lights of their destination of Sangar, killing the five crew. Sangar was experiencing a blackout, which the crew did not realize.

3 March 1962
Polish Air Force Il-14P 026 struck a paratrooper of the 6 Pormoska Airborne Division (6 PDP-D) in mid-air near Warsaw, killing him and injuring the pilot. The co-pilot took control and performed a wheels-up landing.

27 March 1962
Cubana Flight 853, an Il-14 (CU-T819), crashed in the sea shortly after takeoff from Antonio Maceo Airport, killing all 22 on board.

4 April 1962
An Aeroflot Il-14P (CCCP-41852) lost control and crashed near Shchastlivoye during a training flight after the left flap failed to extend during final approach due to fatigue failure of a bolt; all four crew were injured, but survived.

13 June 1962
An Aeroflot Il-14M (CCCP-91536) bounced twice and struck an earthen wall while landing at Odessa after landing on the grass next to the runway due to ATC errors; all 35 on board survived.

6 July 1962
Aeroflot Flight 40, an Il-14M (CCCP-91554), crashed some 34 km (21 mi) from Tashkent Airport due to gradual loss of altitude following an engine failure, killing 11 of 38 on board.

18 September 1962
Aeroflot Flight 213, an Il-14M (CCCP-61628), struck a mountain 29 mi south-southeast of Cherskiy Airport after the crew failed to follow departure procedure, killing all 32 on board.

9 October 1962
An Aeroflot Avia 14(M) (CCCP-52062) overran the runway on landing at Grozny after landing too late in poor weather; no casualties.

10 October 1962
CSA Flight 306, an Avia 14-32A (OK-MCT), struck the side of Spidláky Hill (4 mi southeast of Brno-Tuřany Airport) due to a premature descent after the pilot thought he was closer to the airport than he really was, killing 13 of 42 on board.

16 June 1963
A TAROM VEB 14P (YR-ILL) crashed near Békéssámson, Hungary following an engine fire and resultant wing separation, killing all 31 on board. The aircraft was flying West German tourists from Munich to Constanta; the fire was probably the result of a fuel leak.

4 August 1963
A MIAT Mongolian Airlines Avia 14 Super (MONGOL-105, c/n 014104) struck the side of Otgontenger Mountain, killing at least two. According to a Mongolian journalist, the Avia 14 had departed Ulan Bator for Uvs and Hovd with more than 40 on board. It was not until 2005 that the wreckage was cleaned up by dragging and sliding it into a nearby canyon.

24 August 1963
Aeroflot Flight 663, an Avia 14P (CCCP-61617), struck a hillside 20 mi northwest of Kutaisi Airport after the crew deviated from the flight route, killing all 32 on board.

17 October 1963
An Egyptian Air Force Il-14 crashed at Aswan after an engine fire, killing all 14 on board.

20 October 1963
An Aeroflot Il-14M (CCCP-04197) struck a glacier face on Graham Bell Island after the crew became disorientated, killing all seven on board.

7 December 1963
An Interflug Il-14P (DM-SBL) force-landed in a military training area north of Königsbrück following total electrical failure due to generator problems; all 33 on board survived.

31 December 1963
East German Air Force Il-14T 445 was being delivered to Egypt when it was accidentally shot down.

17 February 1964
A Malév Hungarian Airlines VEB 14P (HA-MAH) burned out in a hangar fire at Ferihegy Airport.

17 February 1964
An Indian Air Force Il-14 crashed in the Banihal Pass due to loss of control after accidentally flying into a thunderstorm, killing all 13 on board. Wreckage was found in May 1964.

22 August 1964
Czechoslovak Air Force Avia 14T 3148 struck trees in poor visibility and crashed at Hurka, killing the 10 crew.

9 October 1964
A TAROM Il-14 (YR-ILB) broke up in mid-air and crashed near Cugir after encountering a downburst, killing all 31 on board.

28 November 1964
Aeroflot Flight F-51, an Il-14P (CCCP-41883), crashed in the Suramskogo mountain range (near Surami) due to ATC errors, killing seven of 15 on board.

13 February 1965
Aeroflot Flight A-3, an Avia 14P (CCCP-52003), struck a mountain near Yevlakh after drifting off course due to a possible navigation error, killing all 23 on board.

19 June 1965
A Cubana Il-14 (CU-T824) crashed near Jaruco after it was accidentally shot down by a Cuban S-75 Dvina SAM missile during a combined exercise with the Cuban Army, killing the five crew.

1965
An Egyptian Air Force Il-14T (ex East German Air Force 491) crashed while being delivered to Egypt, possibly shot down by accident.

1 January 1966
An Aeroflot Avia 14P (CCCP-61618) struck Mount Yurchik after a loss of altitude following engine failure, killing all 23 on board. The engine failure was caused by a bad cylinder head.

16 February 1966
Aeroflot Flight 302, an Il-14M (CCCP-52058), crashed 25 mi north of Pechora after a loss of control following engine failure and resultant fire, killing all 26 on board. The number five cylinder broke (due to a design defect), causing a thrown rod that took out cylinders three and seven. Hydraulic fluid leaked out of the crankcase and through the exhaust manifold, causing the fire.

23 April 1966
Aeroflot Flight 2723, an Il-14P (CCCP-61772), ditched in the sea off Boyuk Zira following unexplained engine problems, killing all 33 on board.

5 November 1966
An Air Mali Il-14M (TZ-ABH) crashed at Cayolle Pass in the French Alps during a transfer flight from Minsk to Bamako with stops at Zagreb and Marseille, killing the seven crew.

12 March 1967
Aeroflot Flight 1799, an Il-14P (CCCP-61657), crashed 54 mi from Yakutsk while attempting a forced landing following an engine fire, killing 15 of 20 on board. The fire was probably caused by a fuel leak.

13 July 1967
A Federal Border Guard Aviation Command Il-14 struck a hill near Ozyorski following a go-around during a training flight; there were no survivors.

17 November 1967
An Interflug VEB 14P (DM-SAF) was written off following an emergency landing at Leipzig; the aircraft was preserved in a museum at Peissnitzinsel Island, Halle, then moved to Pulspforde (near Zerbst) in summer 1991, and finally moved to the Hugo Junkers Museum in Dessau on 10 September 1999.

9 March 1968
An Aeroflot Il-14 (CCCP-41840) struck Mount Getantag in poor visibility, killing the five crew. The aircraft was flying too low.

11 October 1968
A CSA Czechoslovak Airlines Avia 14-32A (OK-MCJ, Svit Gottwaldov) crashed shortly after takeoff from Ruzyně International Airport following unexplained engine failure, killing 11 of 40 on board.

24 October 1968
An Interflug Il-14P (DM-SAI) crashed at Berlin while attempting an emergency landing following unknown technical problems; the three crew survived.

5 December 1968
A CAAC Il-14 (640) crashed short of the runway at Beijing Capital Airport while on approach, killing 13 of 14 on board, including scientist Guo Yonghuai. Later that day, a second CAAC Il-14 also crashed short of the runway due to pilot error, killing both pilots. The two Il-14s crashed just 200 m (660 ft) from each other.

23 June 1969
Aeroflot Flight 831, an Il-14M (CCCP-52018), collided in mid-air with a Soviet Air Force Antonov An-12 (callsign "08525") over Yukhnov, killing all 120 on board both aircraft. The Il-14 had disobeyed ATC instructions and climbed without permission.

26 June 1969
An Aeroflot Il-14M (CCCP-91527) crashed near Magadan while attempting an emergency landing following an in-flight fire, killing three of five on board.

28 June 1969
Aeroflot Flight F-28, an Il-14M (CCCP-91495) struck a mountain 24 mi northeast of Talas after the crew deviated from the takeoff procedure, killing all 40 on board.

1 September 1969
Aeroflot Flight 55, an Il-14P (CCCP-61731), struck Mount Dumka (24 mi southwest of Zaliv Kresta Airfield) after deviating from the flight route during approach, killing 22 of 27 on board.

15 November 1969
A CAAC Il-14 (618) struck the side of Mount Taiping after deviating 7 km (4.3 mi) from the flight route, killing all six on board. The mountain was taller than the crew realized due to a map error; the map indicated an altitude of 508 m (1,667 ft) when it was actually 841 m (2,759 ft).

10 December 1969
Aeroflot Flight 2953, an Avia 14P (CCCP-52010), entered a sudden nosedive and crashed off Makhachkala, killing all 17 on board. The aircraft had suffered bird strikes, destroying the cockpit and possibly injuring the crew.

== 1970s ==
25 February 1970
An Aeroflot Il-14M (CCCP-61637) crashed shortly after takeoff from Ust-Maya Airport after the number two propeller reversed due to a malfunction, killing the five crew. The aircraft was on a positioning flight from Ust-Maya to Yakutsk.

4 April 1970
Aeroflot Flight 2903, an Avia 14M (CCCP-52002), crashed on approach to Zaporozhye Airport during an attempted go-round after the crew began descending too soon, killing seven of 35 on board.

8 June 1970
A CSA Czechoslovak Airlines Avia 14 was hijacked by eight people and diverted to Nürnberg, West Germany.

28 June 1970
A PLAAF Il-14, of the 13th Division, 39th Regiment, crashed on a river bank at Yicheng shortly after takeoff due to a reversed trim tab, killing the five crew.

8 August 1970
A CSA Czechoslovak Airlines Avia 14 was hijacked by three people and diverted to Vienna, Austria after the hijackers' demands were met.

19 August 1970
A LOT Polish Airlines Il-14 was hijacked by five people and diverted to Bornholm, Denmark.

27 October 1970
An Aeroflot Il-14 was hijacked by two people and diverted to Sinop, Turkey.

13 November 1970
Aeroflot Flight 57, an Il-14M (CCCP-52024), was hijacked 20 minutes after takeoff from Kaunas by two hijackers, who were husband and wife, and demanded to be flown to Gotland, Sweden to escape the Soviet Union. The hijackers poured gasoline and kerosene in the cabin and cockpit and threatened to ignite it. The crew managed to restrain the hijackers and the aircraft continued to Palanga where it landed safely.

14 November 1970
A CAAC Il-14 (616) crashed at Guiyang after deviating from the glidescope, probably in an attempt to descend below clouds, after which it struck a hill and broke apart.

7 February 1971
An Aeroflot Il-14M (CCCP-91535) was written off after landing short at Kirovsk Airport.

27 May 1971
A TAROM Il-14 was hijacked by six people and diverted to Vienna.

22 July 1971
An Iraqi Air Force aircraft, possibly an Il-14, crashed and burned at Jeddah, Saudi Arabia due to fuel exhaustion. The aircraft was carrying high-ranking Iraqi government officials.

11 August 1971

A Minaviaprom Il-14 (CCCP-64456) crashed near Nashchekino following an unexplained loss of control, killing all six on board. It was reported that the center of gravity was too far forward and the cargo was not properly secured. Turbulence or a disconnected autopilot were also theorized.

30 December 1971
An Aeroflot Il-14M (CCCP-91570) overran the runway on landing at Baranikha Airport, Russia; no casualties.

1 February 1972
A CSA Czechoslovak Airlines Avia 14-40 (OK-MCG) landed wheels-up at Karlovy Vary due to apparent crew errors; no casualties.

4 August 1972
Aeroflot Flight 423, an Il-14M (CCCP-91537), struck a building and crashed while attempting a forced landing following an unexplained engine failure; the aircraft burned out, but all on board were able to escape and survived.

4 November 1972
A Balkan Bulgarian Airlines Il-14P (LZ-ILA) struck a hillside near Cruncha while on approach to Plovdiv due to ATC errors, killing all 35 on board.

14 January 1973
A CAAC Airlines Il-14 (644) struck a mountain near Guiyang after deviating from the flight route due to pilot error, killing all 29 on board.

24 February 1973
An Il-14, sent to fly Deng Xiaoping back to Beijing from Jiangxi, mysteriously exploded in mid-air over Anhui in what was possibly an assassination attempt. Deng was not on board, as he had taken a train to Beijing instead.

11 March 1973
An Aeroflot Il-14M (CCCP-04192) exploded and caught fire after landing on Jokhov Island; all on board escaped and survived before the aircraft burned out. An electric box caught fire in the cargo hold and fuel barrels later exploded.

4 July 1973
An Aeroflot Il-14M (CCCP-91534) struck the side of Mount Krasnov (33 mi south of Shakhtersk) following a premature descent due to ATC errors, killing all 18 on board.

25 October 1973
A CSA Czechoslovak Airlines Avia 14-32A (OK-MCV) burned out in a fire at Brno-Tuřany Airport.

29 November 1973
Czechoslovak Air Force Avia 14T 3155 crashed on approach to Szentkiralyszabadja Air Base following excessive descent, killing three of 23 on board.

6 April 1974
An Aeroflot Avia 14P (CCCP-52023) suffered damage on landing at Ust-Kuiga Airport after the flight engineer accidentally raised the landing gear; all 18 on board survived.

14 November 1974
An Aeroflot Il-14M (CCCP-91515) crashed after takeoff from Zhulyany Airport during a navaids calibration flight due to wing separation following an engine fire, killing the six crew. The fire was caused by a fuel leak.

9 August 1975
An Aeroflot Il-14M (CCCP-52056) struck a wooded hillside 18 mi from Bagdarin after the crew deviated from the approach pattern, killing all 11 on board. The aircraft was operating a special mission on behalf of the Voyekova Geophysical Observatory to observe thunderstorms. After the mission, the aircraft encountered bad weather and had descended too low when the accident occurred.

1 March 1976
A TAROM VEB 14P (YR-ILO) crashed short of the runway at Sibiu Airport while on approach, killing six of nine on board.

24 March 1976
An Aeroflot Il-14LIK (CCCP-61756) struck a mountain 33 mi northeast of Ashgabat Airport in cloud while flying under VFR in IFR conditions during a navaid calibration flight, killing the six crew.

18 December 1976
An Aeroflot Il-14RR (CCCP-61752) struck Mount Ostraya (8 mi east of Yuzhno-Sakhalinsk) after the crew deviated from the approach pattern, killing eight of 10 on board.

11 February 1977
ČSA Flight 475, an Avia 14T (OK-OCA), struck trees and crashed short of the runway at Ivanka Airport due to crew errors, killing four of five on board. As of 2026, this is Czechoslovak/Czech Airlines last fatal accident.

5 April 1977
An Aeroflot Il-14FKM (CCCP-61675) lost control and crashed near Penek, Russia after the rudder locked during a simulated engine failure, killing the six crew.

20 July 1977
Aeroflot Flight B-2, an Avia 14M (CCCP-52096), struck trees and crashed shortly after takeoff from Vitim Airport due to crew and ATC errors, killing 39 of 40 on board. The accident remains the deadliest involving the Avia 14.

27 October 1977
An Aeroflot Il-14M (CCCP-04195) crashed near Cape Chelyuskin due to a navigation error; all 11 on board survived.

4 March 1978
A Soviet Air Force Il-14 crashed on the frozen Lake Ukshozero shortly after takeoff, killing all seven on board; the crew was probably disorientated after entering clouds following artificial horizon failure.

2 January 1979
An Aeroflot Il-14FKM (CCCP-04193) crashed shortly after takeoff from Molodyozhnaya Station after encountering windshear, killing three of 14 on board.

30 October 1979
An Aeroflot Il-14M (CCCP-61683) burned out aboard ship MV Olyenok during transport; the ship was off Denmark at the time of the fire.

== 1980s ==
13 May 1980
A Cubana Il-14 (CU-T322) crashed in the sea off Varadero following a loss of control during a training flight, killing the three crew.

12 June 1980
Czechoslovak Air Force Avia 14T 3151 was written off following an incident after takeoff from Brno-Černovice.

15 September 1980
An Aeroflot Il-14P (CCCP-41831) struck trees and crashed on approach to Bereznik Airport after the controls for the left engine failed; all 20 on board survived.

12 February 1981
An Aeroflot Il-14T (CCCP-04188) crashed on landing at Krenkel Station after landing next to the runway in deep snow, killing two of 13 on board.

14 June 1981
Aeroflot Flight 498, an Il-14M (CCCP-41838), struck a mountain on the Holy Nose Peninsula in Lake Baikal due to crew error, killing all 48 on board. The accident remains the deadliest involving the Il-14.

1 August 1981
An Aeroflot Il-14M (CCCP-91517) struck terrain on Utichiy Island in bad weather due to crew errors, killing all 11 on board.

16 September 1984
An Aeroflot Il-14FK (CCCP-91611) ditched in the Irben Strait off Saaremaa after the number two engine failed during a research flight; all 10 on board survived.

10 January 1985
A MAP Moscow OAO Il-14T (CCCP-06142) crashed short of the runway at Uralsk Airport during a nighttime approach; all six on board survived.

26 July 1985
A Soviet Air Force Il-14 struck Mount Komendant (Magadan region), killing the seven crew.

17 February 1986
An Aeroflot Il-14M (CCCP-41816) struck the surface of Philippi Glacier after running out of fuel in whiteout conditions, killing the six crew.

7 October 1988
Shanxi Airlines Flight 4218, an Il-14P (B-4218) crashed on the roof of a hotel in Linfen following engine failure, killing 44 of 48 on board and 2 people on the ground; the engine failure was caused by a broken oil pump drive shaft. The aircraft, operating a sightseeing flight over Linfen area, was overloaded with 44 passengers although the aircraft could only carry 14.

26 January 1989
An Aeroflot Avia 14(PT) (CCCP-52066) burned out at Mirny Ice Station while being refueled, killing three technicians who were refueling the aircraft. The fire was probably caused by static electricity.

6 July 1989
An Aeroflot Il-14T (CCCP-61788) ditched in the Akatan Lagoon (off Cape Schmidt) following double engine failure during an ice reconnaissance flight; all nine on board survived.

== 1990s ==
12 September 1990
An Aeroflot Il-14LIK-1 (CCCP-41803) belly landed on a glacier 221 mi from Mirny Ice Station after the number two engine was shut down due to a loss of oil pressure; no casualties.

8 October 1992
A Wuhan Airlines Avia 14(M) (B-4211) struck a hillside near Dingxi, China due to a loss of altitude following engine failure, killing 14 of 35 on board. Following the accident, China retired all civilian Il-14s.
