= Shanxi Airlines =

Chinese airline

Shan Xi Airlines
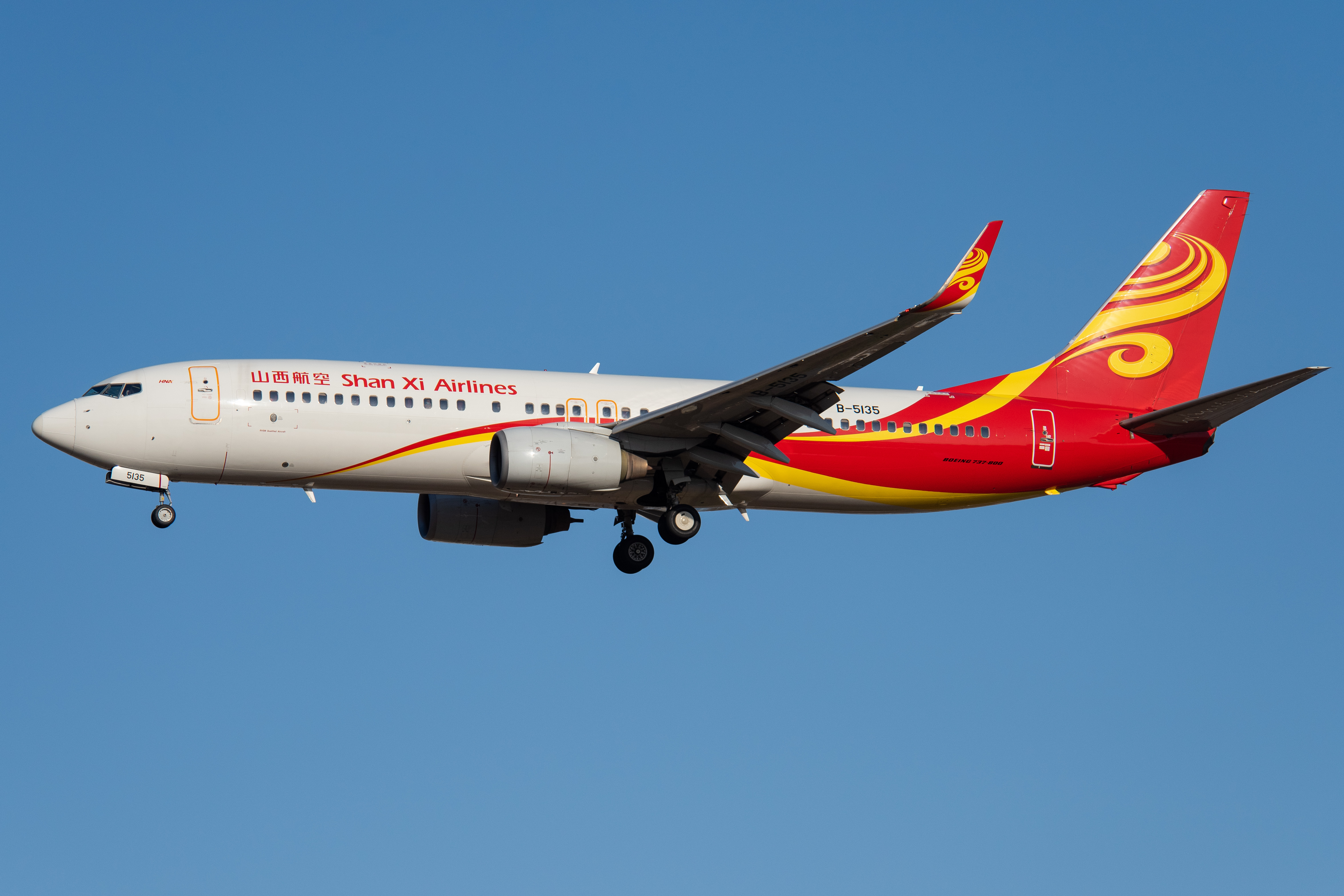
- Shan Xi Airlines Boeing 737-800 in standard livery
IATA	ICAO	Call sign
8C	CXI	SHANXI
- Founded: 1988
- Commenced operations: 6 July 2001
- Ceased operations: 2009 (merged with Hainan Airlines)
- Fleet size: 8
- Headquarters: Taiyuan, China

Shan Xi Airlines was an airline based in Taiyuan in the People's Republic of China. It operated scheduled domestic passenger services. On 29 November 2007, it merged with China Xinhua Airlines and Chang An Airlines to form Grand China Air, a subsidiary of Hainan Airlines.

== History ==
The airline was established in 1988 and started operations on 6 July 2001. Hainan Airlines owned a 92.51% stake in Shanxi Airlines, acquired in a deal approved by state authorities as part of China's airline consolidation. Hainan merged the airline into Hainan Airlines in 2009.

== Fleet ==
As of February 2006, the Shan Xi Airlines fleet consisted of the following aircraft:

Shanxi Airlines fleet
Aircraft	In service	Orders	Notes
Boeing 737-700	3	—	Taken over by Lucky Air.
Boeing 737-800	3	—	Taken over by Hong Kong Airlines.
Dornier 328 Jet	2	—	
Total	8	—	

== Accidents and incidents ==
- On 7 October 1988, Flight 4218, an Ilyushin Il-14 (registered B-2418) undergoing a sightseeing flight for workers at a local knitting factory crashed shortly after takeoff from Linfen Yaodu Airport. 44 of the 48 passengers and crew, as well as 2 pedestrians, were killed.
