= Museo del Aire =

Museo del Aire may refer to:

- Museo del Aire (Cuba), Havana
- Museo del Aire (Madrid)
