= Flight 663 =

Flight 663 may refer to the following aviation accidents:

- Aeroflot Flight 663, crashed on 24 August 1963
- Eastern Air Lines Flight 663, crashed on 8 February 1965
- United Airlines Flight 663, suspected terrorist attack on 7 April 2010
