= Aeroflot Flight B-2 =

1977 aviation accident

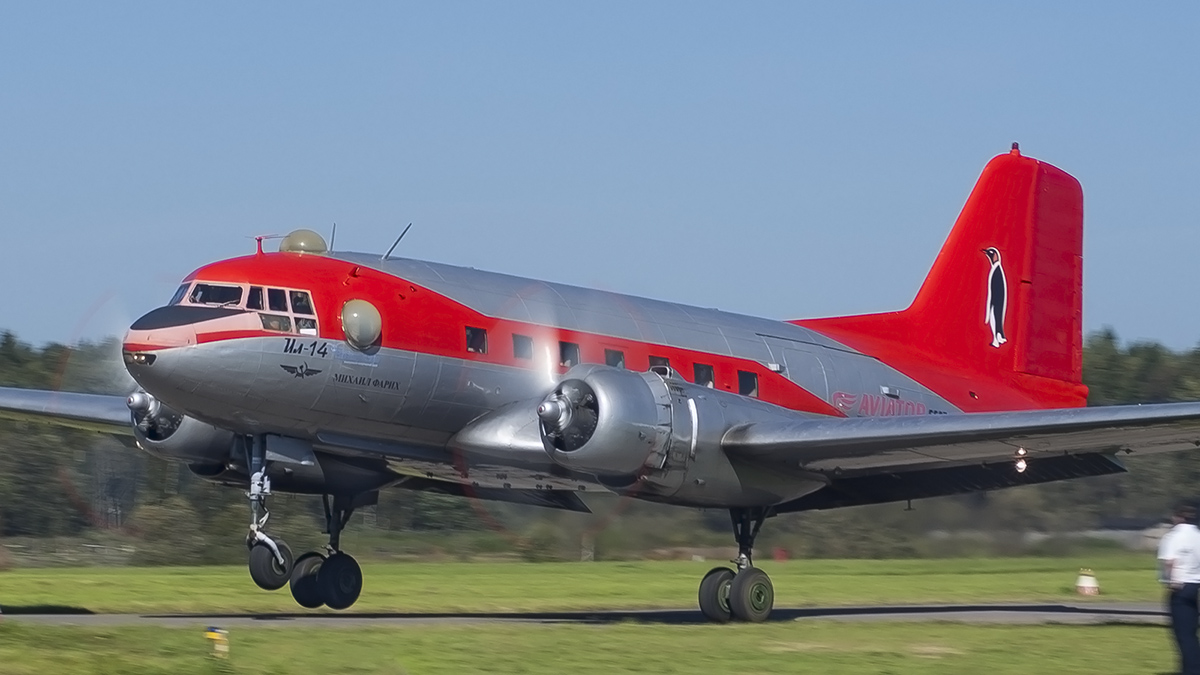
- An Ilyushin Il-14 similar to the accident aircraft

Accident
- Date: 20 July 1977
- Summary: Crashed shortly after takeoff due to pilot error and ATC error
- Site: 500 meters north of runway 34 outside Vitim Airport

Aircraft
- Aircraft type: Avia 14M
- Operator: Aeroflot
- Registration: CCCP-52096
- Flight origin: Vitim Airport
- Destination: International Airport Irkutsk
- Occupants: 40
- Passengers: 34
- Crew: 6
- Fatalities: 39
- Injuries: 1
- Survivors: 1

Aeroflot Flight B-2 was a regularly scheduled passenger flight operated by Aeroflot from Vitim Airport in the Sakha Republic to Irkutsk International Airport near Irkutsk. On 20 July 1977, the Avia 14 operating this flight crashed into trees outside the airport shortly after takeoff. Thirty-three passengers and all six crewmembers were killed, while one passenger survived.

The Air Accident Investigation Commission concluded the cause of the accident was the use of a runway unsuitable for takeoff.

== Accident ==
At the time of departure the wind was from 120 degrees at 3 meters per second, it was raining and the runway had standing water on it. The pilot in command elected to take off from runway 34 with a quartering tail wind, and to use the left (west) side of the runway as it was drier there. Lined up 35 meters to the left of center, the crew commenced the takeoff. 225 meters from the start of the takeoff run the left main landing gear tires ran over a runway edge marking cone. 120 meters further down the runway the crew rotated the aircraft and 105 meters further ran over another cone. 100 meters further and almost completely off the runway, the right main landing gear tires ran over a third cone. The aircraft was still accelerating with the nose up when a fourth cone was flattened. 945 meters from the beginning of takeoff, the airliner lifted off and flew 185 meters before striking the airport perimeter fence with its tail. Flying another 200 meters at an altitude of 14 meters, the aircraft impacted trees at the edge of a forest, losing part of its left wing tip and outermost aileron. After the impact with trees, the aircraft was able to climb to 25–30 meters altitude, but after flying 300 meters further with a high pitch angle the aircraft stalled, rolling to the right, pitched over and descended rapidly. Rolled 50–55 degrees right and at a negative pitch angle of 45–50 degrees, the aircraft crashed into the forest 500 meters from the end of the runway, 225 meters to the left of center. The impact and post-crash fire killed all on board except a 21-year-old passenger who survived with injuries.

== Aircraft ==
Construction of the Avia 14 was completed at the Avia aircraft factory, Czechoslovakia, on 28 June 1958 as a 14-32A, the 32-seat variant of the Avia 14. Two days later it was purchased by Czech Airlines and registered OK-MCP. On 28 October 1975 the airliner was acquired by the Soviet Union and re-registered as CCCP-52096 to Aeroflot and converted to an Avia 14M. At the time of the accident, the aircraft had sustained a total of 20,464 flight hours and 20,467 takeoff and landing cycles.

== Investigation ==
The Air Accident Investigation Commission placed most of the blame on the captain for deciding to take off from a runway with a large amount of standing water on it and attempting to use only part of the runway. A lack of caution by air traffic controllers in allowing the use of a wet runway with a tail wind and incomplete weather information were also determining factors in the crash.

== See also ==
- Aeroflot accidents and incidents
- Aeroflot accidents and incidents in the 1970s
- List of accidents and incidents involving the Ilyushin Il-14
