= Shanxi Airlines Flight 4218 =

1988 aviation incident in China

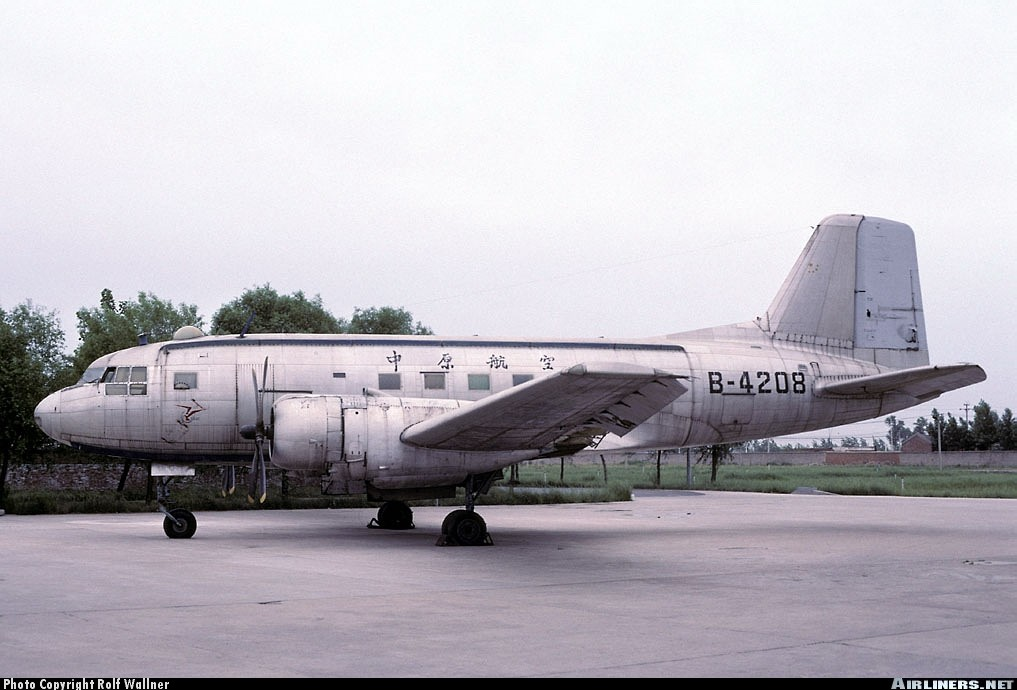
- An Ilyushin Il-14P similar to the aircraft involved

Accident
- Date: 7 October 1988
- Summary: Mechanical failure, passenger overload
- Site: Near Linfen Yaodu Airport, Shanxi Province, People's Republic of China
- Total fatalities: 46
- Total injuries: 4

Aircraft
- Aircraft type: Ilyushin Il-14P
- Operator: Shanxi Airlines
- Registration: B-4218
- Flight origin: Linfen Yaodu Airport, Shanxi Province, People's Republic of China
- Destination: Linfen Yaodu Airport, Shanxi Province, People's Republic of China
- Occupants: 48
- Passengers: 44
- Crew: 4
- Fatalities: 44
- Injuries: 4
- Survivors: 4

Ground casualties
- Ground fatalities: 2

Shanxi Airlines Flight 4218 was a sightseeing flight operated by Shanxi Airlines. On October 7, 1988, the flight was carried out by an Ilyushin Il-14 with the registration number B-4218. At around 13:30 that day, the plane took off from Linfen Yaodu Airport. About one minute later, the No. 1 engine failed. Due to uneven thrust and overloading, the aircraft crashed into a restaurant fifteen seconds later, resulting in the deaths of 44 people on board, with only 4 survivors. Two people on the ground also died.

== Aircraft ==
The aircraft involved was an Ilyushin Il-14 registered as B-4218 and was 32 years old at the time of the accident. It first flew in 1956 and was equipped with two air-cooled radial engines.

== Incident ==
On the day of the incident at around 13:30, Flight 4218 took off from Linfen Yaodu Airport. About 90 seconds after takeoff, the aircraft's number one engine malfunctioned and stopped working, causing severe imbalance between the left and right sides of the plane. Additionally, the aircraft was above its maximum takeoff weight. Fifteen seconds after the engine failure, it crashed onto a nearby restaurant and factory near the airport. 44 people on board were killed, with only 4 survivors, and two people on the ground also died.

== Investigation ==
The Civil Aviation Administration of China published a report explaining the crash and the cause of the accident. They had concluded that the Il-14 transport aircraft had a maximum passenger capacity of 14, while Shanxi Airlines had arranged seating for 12. However, at the time, the plane was carrying a total of 48 people, almost three times its capacity. In addition, the engine failure was caused due to the drive shaft of the left engine becoming twisted due to fatigue which stopped the oil supply. The loss of engine power lead to a loss of thrust which meant the pilot could not recover and stop sinking. The CAAC concluded that the engine failure was the main cause of the accident. A propeller malfunction caused the aircraft to tilt, which was also a major factor in the engine failure.

The CAAC suggested that Shanxi Airlines "firmly establish the mindset of 'safety first'", and should ensure that safety is the top priority of the airline. The authority also said that Shanxi Airlines must enforce its own regulations in accordance with the CAAC and State Council, especially those in relation to aircraft safety and maintenance. Strict medical examinations for aircrew were also mentioned, with those who failed not being allowed to operate aircraft. The report concluded by saying that Shanxi Airlines could only continue operations after passing acceptance inspections.
