= Museo del Aire (Cuba) =

Museo del Aire (Aircraft: Antonov An-2)
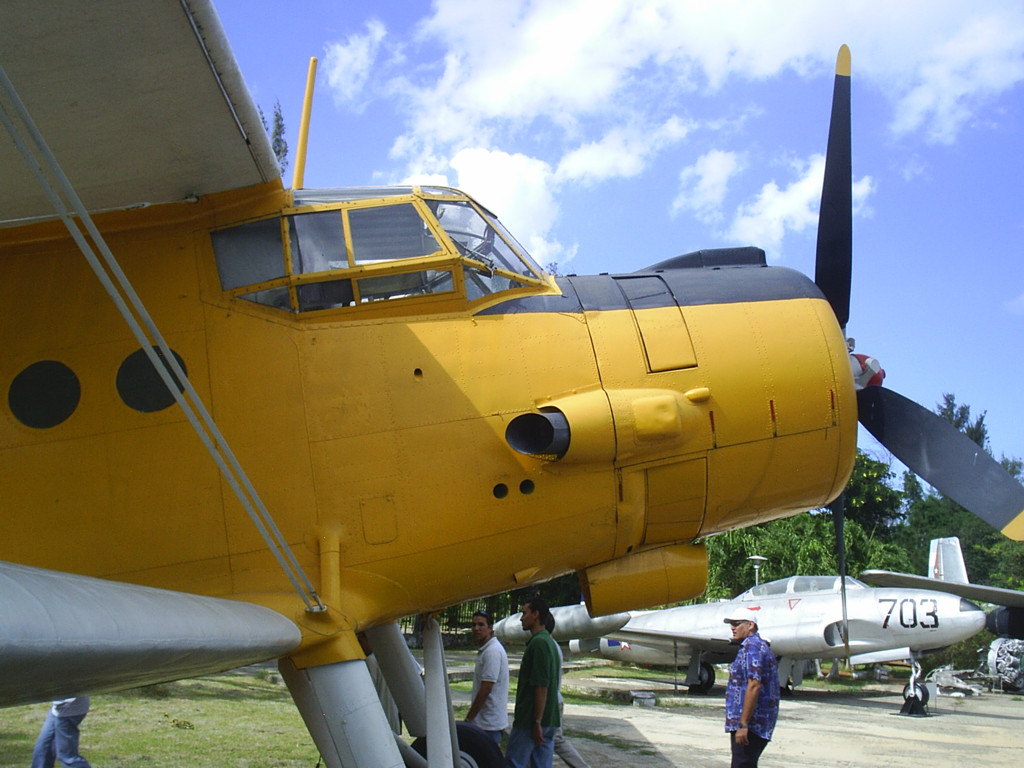
- Established: 17 April 1986
- Location: Ciudad de La Habana (Havana), Cuba
- Coordinates: 23°4′5″N 82°27′30″W
- Type: Aviation museum

The Museo del Aire was a national aviation museum located in the south-western suburbs of Havana, Cuba. In August 2010, the museum was closed, and the entire collection was moved to San Antonio de los Baños Air Base.

== Aircraft on display ==
Designation	Identity	Notes
Aero L-39C Albatros	16	
Antonov An-2	I-40	
Antonov An-26	T-53	
CCF Harvard 4	116	
Cessna 310C	58	
Douglas A-26B Invader	937	
Ilyushin Il-14	CU-T825	Cubana de Aviación
Lockheed T-33A	703	
MiG-15UTI	02	
MiG-17F	237	
MiG-19P	88	
MiG-21F13	411	
MiG-21MF	111	
MiG-21PF	1006	
MiG-21UM	502	
MiG-23BN	711	
MiG-23MF	822	
MiG-23ML	223	
MiG-23UB	706	
MiG-29UB	901	(removed from display, 2008)
Mil Mi-4P	H-100	
Mil Mi-8T	H-02	
Mil Mi-8TB	H-85	
Mil Mi-17	101	
Mil Mi-24D	12	
P-51D Mustang	401	
T-28A Trojan	121	
Yakovlev Yak-40	14-41	

== See also ==
- List of aerospace museums
- List of museums in Cuba
- Museum of the Revolution (Cuba) (Museo de la Revolución)
