= Aeroflot Flight 663 =

Aviation accident

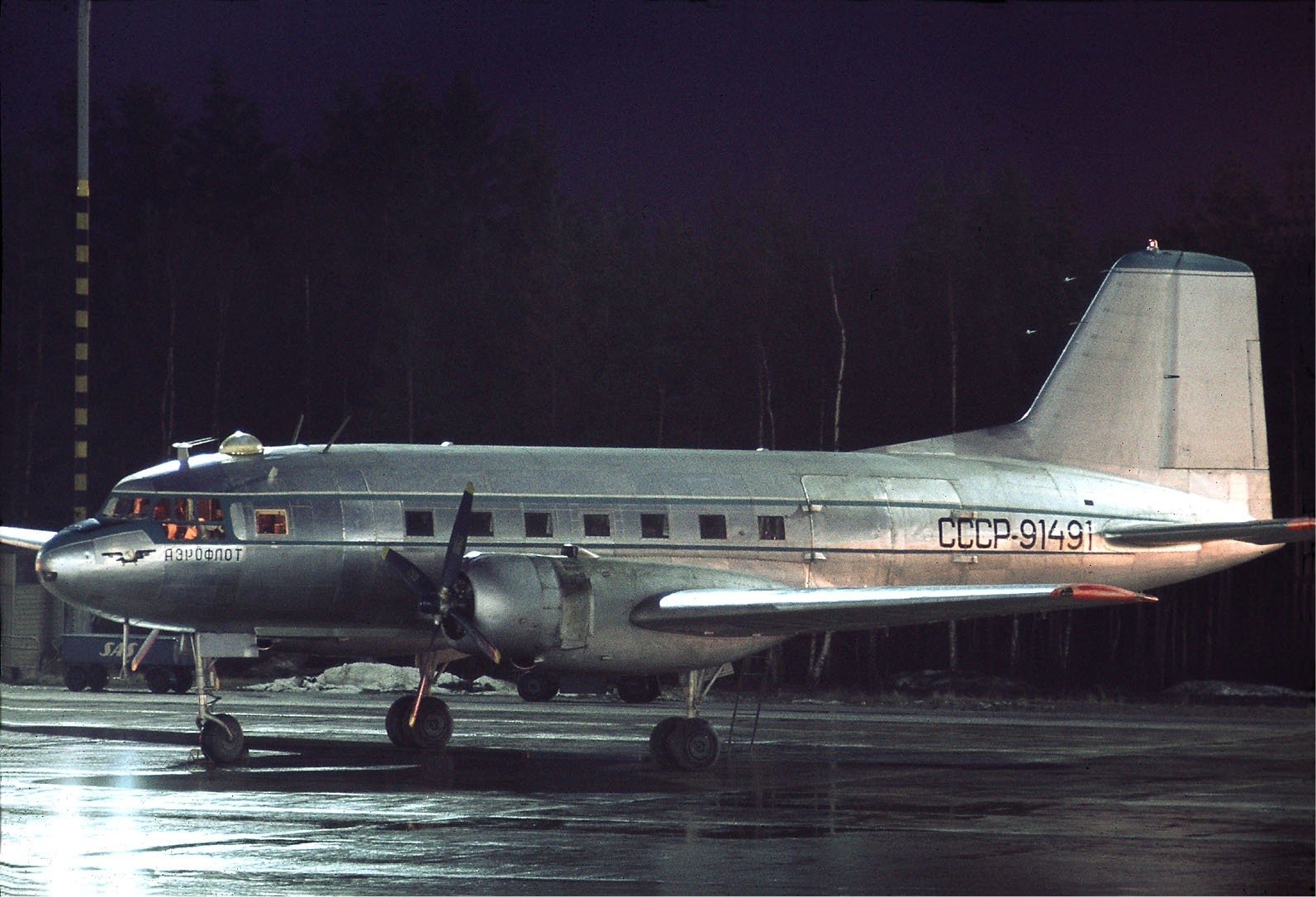
- An Aeroflot Il-14, similar to the one involved in the accident

Accident
- Date: 24 August 1963
- Summary: Collision with a mountain after deviating due to adverse weather conditions
- Site: 7 km S Gegechkori, 32 km NW Kutaisi airport (GSSR, the USSR; 42°28′N 42°24′E

Aircraft
- Aircraft type: Avia 14P
- Operator: Aeroflot
- Registration: СССР-61617
- Flight origin: Tbilisi International Airport, Tbilisi, (GSSR)
- 1st stopover: Kopitnari Airport, Kutaisi, (GSSR)
- Last stopover: Sukhumi Babushara Airport, Sukhumi and AbASSR, GSSR
- Destination: Krasnodar International Airport, Krasnodar, (RSFSR)
- Occupants: 32
- Passengers: 27
- Crew: 5
- Fatalities: 32
- Survivors: 0

Aeroflot Flight 663 was a Soviet passenger flight from Tbilisi International Airport to Krasnodar International Airport that crashed on 24 August 1963, in the Kutaisi region. The crash involved an Aeroflot Avia 14. All 27 passengers and 5 crew on board were killed.

== Aircraft ==
The aircraft had a serial number of 602107 and was released by Avia (Prague) on February 23, 1957. The passenger capacity of the cabin was 18 seats, although the aircraft was technically a cargo plane. The airliner was sold to the Soviet Union's Head Department of the Civil Air Fleet, where it received the registration number СССР-L1617 and was sent to the Tbilisi Joint Aviation Division of the Georgian Territorial Administration of the Civil Air Fleet. In 1959, a re-registration was carried out, which changed the registration to CCCP-61617. According to one source, the airliner was converted into an Avia 14M (Il-14M) model at an unknown date. The total operating time of the aircraft was 11,682 hours.

== Crew ==
- Pilot-in-Command — Archil Alekseevich Heteshvili
- Co-pilot — Georgy Bely
- Flight engineer — Mikhail Zakharovich Suprunov
- Radio operator — Grigory Ovanesovich Akopyants

== Accident ==
Aeroflot Flight 663 was a passenger flight from Tbilisi International Airport to Krasnodar International Airport. At 10:08, the flight landed at Kutaisi International Airport, its first stop. At 10:45, the flight departed from Kutaisi, and after 3–4 minutes, an altitude of 600 meters was reported. In response, the dispatcher instructed to follow the main route at an altitude of 1,500 meters, while monitoring the weather conditions. At 10:52 the aircraft was reported to continue to Sukhumi at an altitude of 1,500 meters. The flight took place between cloud layers in conditions of heavy precipitation, but the ground was still visible. After that, the crew did not contact or answer calls.

After departing from Kutaisi, Flight 663 began to deviate to the right of the route. In the Khoni area, the crew unexpectedly encountered a severe thunderstorm, with the lower cloud limit being 300–400 meters, and the visibility not exceeding 3 kilometers. Despite bad weather, Heteshvili decided not to return to the airport or follow the roundabout through Poti, but instead try to bypass the thunderstorm on the right side of the mountains. Bypassing to the right, the plane was flying at an altitude of 900 meters when it hit a zone with heavy rain, which the radio operator reported to the ground at 10:52. At 10:53, the flight, 32 kilometers north-west of Kutaisi airport and 7 kilometers north of Gegechkori, crashed into the mountainside at 900 meters. The aircraft was completely destroyed and caught fire. All 32 people on board were killed.

The total on board should have been 5 crew members and 24 passengers. But while studying the wreckage, three stowaway passengers were also found.

== Cause ==
According to the weather forecast, a thunderstorm was expected on the main flight route, with stratocumulus and cumulonimbus clouds having a lower limit of 600–1000 meters and a horizontal visibility of 4–10 kilometers. The pilot knew that there was a thunderstorm on the main route from Kutaisi to Sukhumi, while on the roundabout (via Poti) weather conditions were good. A flight that left Kutaisi earlier determined that the main route to Sukhumi was impossible, therefore, requested permission to follow the detour route. However, the crew of Flight 663 did not receive this information before departure. This was probably caused by the fatigue of the pilot, who, at the request of the deputy chief of the airport, was delayed from the night shift and had been working for around 14 hours. At 10:38, the control tower was informed that cloud cover had dropped from 1100 to 450 meters, however, this information was not communicated to the crew of Flight 663 either. When the crew tried to circumvent the thunderstorm in the conditions of limited visibility, they did not notice that they were right on the mountains. The lack of visibility and communication resulted in the aircraft colliding with the mountain.

According to the commission, the cause factors were:

1. The air traffic controllers allowed a visual flight at an altitude of 1500 meters in a mountainous area without meteorological conditions.
2. The air traffic controllers at Kutaisi airport did not prohibit the departure and did not warn the crew about the clouds, instead giving instructions to fly at an altitude of 1500 meters, an altitude dangerous during the weather conditions.
3. The pilot performed a visual flight, although in these weather conditions it was impossible, while below the safe altitude.
4. The deputy head of Kutaisi airport allowed the PM of the day shift to be two hours late for work, but when the day shift entered, he did not personally replace him, and therefore the RP of the night shift was forced to stay at work. In turn, the request for an RP of a day shift was delayed not by two, but by four hours, which further increased the working hours of the RP of a night shift.
