= Linfen Yaodu Airport =

Airport in Shanxi, China

Linfen Yaodu Airport 临汾尧都机场
- IATA: LFQ; ICAO: ZBLF

Summary
- Airport type: Public
- Serves: Linfen, Shanxi, China
- Location: Qiaoli, Yaodu District, Shanxi
- Opened: 25 January 2016; 10 years ago
- Built: 1 January 1960; 66 years ago
- Coordinates: 36°7′54″N 111°39′29″E

Map
- Location of airport in Shanxi

Runways
Direction	Length		Surface
Direction	m	ft	Surface
17/35	2,600	8,530

Statistics (2025)
- Passengers: 890,280
- Aircraft movements: 13,619
- Cargo (metric tons): 1,626.0

Linfen Yaodu Airport
- Simplified Chinese: 临汾尧都机场
- Traditional Chinese: 臨汾堯都機場
Transcriptions
Standard Mandarin
- Hanyu Pinyin: Línfén Yáodū Jīchǎng

Linfen Yaodu Airport (IATA: LFQ, ICAO: ZBLF) is an airport serving the city of Linfen in Shanxi Province, China. It is located near the town of Qiaoli in Yaodu District, 15 kilometers from the city center. The airport was first built in 1958 and opened on 1 January 1960, but ceased operations in fall 1965. Construction started again in September 2010 to expand and reopen the airport with an investment of 446 million yuan, and it was originally projected to open in late 2011.

Linfen Airport opened to commercial traffic on 25 January 2016. The airport was formerly known as Linfen Qiaoli Airport (Chinese: 临汾乔李机场) until April 2020.

== History ==
In October 1958, the Civil Aviation Administration of China (CAAC) acquired land in Qiaoli to construct an airport. Construction began in March 1959, covering 26.67 hectares with a 500-meter-long and 45-meter-wide runway. The route was a round trip between Taiyuan, Linfen, and Changzhi using An-II aircraft. Air service commenced on September 1, 1959, but ceased operation in November 1960.

In 1961, an aviation club was established to train parachutists and to conduct aerial spraying of pesticides to control cotton aphids. Flights ceased in 1962 and the airport was transferred to Flight School 027. In 1978, the airport was converted to farmland.

In November 2007, Linfen City launched a project to reconstruct the airport.

In September 2012, the National Development and Reform Commission approved the feasibility study report for the reopening and renovation plan of Linfen Airport in Shanxi Province. The plan was to increase the airport's passenger throughput to 1.87 million and cargo throughput to 1,500 tons by 2020. The project included the construction of a new 2,600-meter runway, a 26,000-square-meter terminal building, a nine-stand apron, and related supporting facilities such as air traffic control and fuel supply. The total investment of the project were 1.287 billion yuan and was expected to be completed in October, 2014. The new Linfen Qiaoli Airport was finally completed and reopened on January 25, 2016.

On May 21, 2020, Linfen Qiaoli Airport was officially renamed "Linfen Yaodu Airport".

On May 17, 2024, the feasibility study report for the expansion and renovation project of Linfen Yaodu Airport was approved. The airport expansion and renovation project started and the target was to make it an international, medium-sized airport, designed to meet the target of 3.6 million passengers and 10,000 tons of cargo throughput per year. The main construction contents included extending the runway to 2800m, adding more aircraft stands to 20, with an additional de-icing stand, a new T2 domestic and international terminal building and other supporting facilities. The total investment of the project was 2.37 billion yuan.

== Facilities ==
The airport will have one runway that is 2,600 meters long and 45 meters wide, and a 4,200-square-meter terminal building. It is projected to handle 430,000 passengers annually by 2020.

== Airlines and destinations ==
Airlines	Destinations
Air China	Beijing–Capital, Wuhan
China Express Airlines	Chongqing, Tianjin
China Southern Airlines	Guangzhou
Juneyao Air	Hangzhou, Nanjing, Shanghai–Pudong
LJ Air	Changsha, Dalian, Harbin, Hohhot, Ningbo, Shenzhen
Sichuan Airlines	Changchun, Chengdu–Tianfu, Kunming

== See also ==
- List of airports in China
- List of the busiest airports in China
