= Vitim Airport =

- IATA: -; ICAO: UERT

Summary
- Airport type: Public
- Serves: Vitim
- Elevation AMSL: 610 ft / 186 m
- Coordinates: 59°27′28″N 112°33′46″E
- Interactive map of Vitim Airport
- Source: Our Airports web site

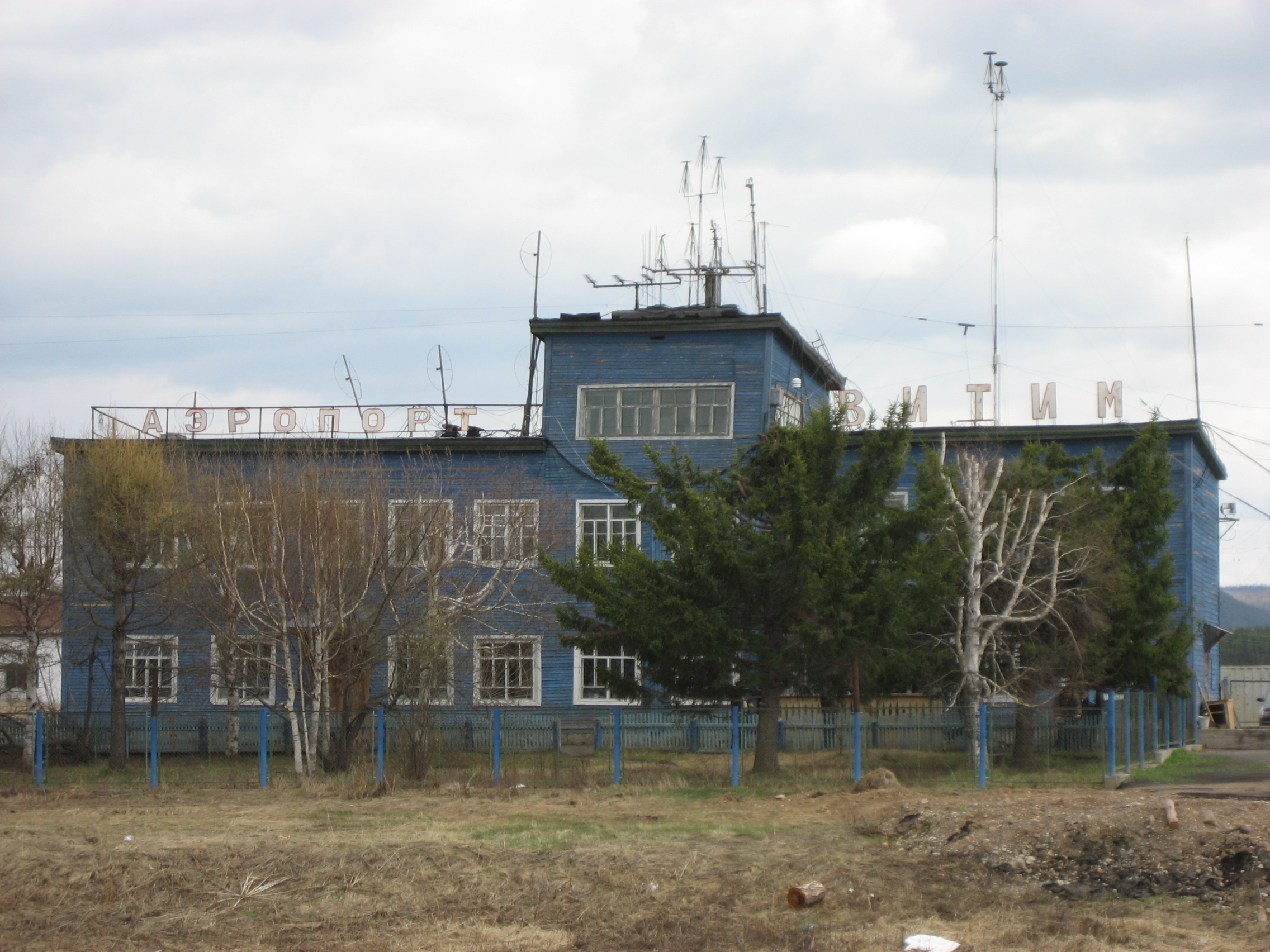
Airport building

Vitim Airport is a public use airport built in Vitim, Sakha (Yakutia) Republic, Russia during World War II for the Alaska-Siberian (ALSIB) air route used to ferry American Lend-Lease aircraft to the Eastern Front.

== Airlines and destinations ==
Airlines	Destinations
