= Ilyushin Il-14 =

Twin-piston-engine Soviet airliner, 1950

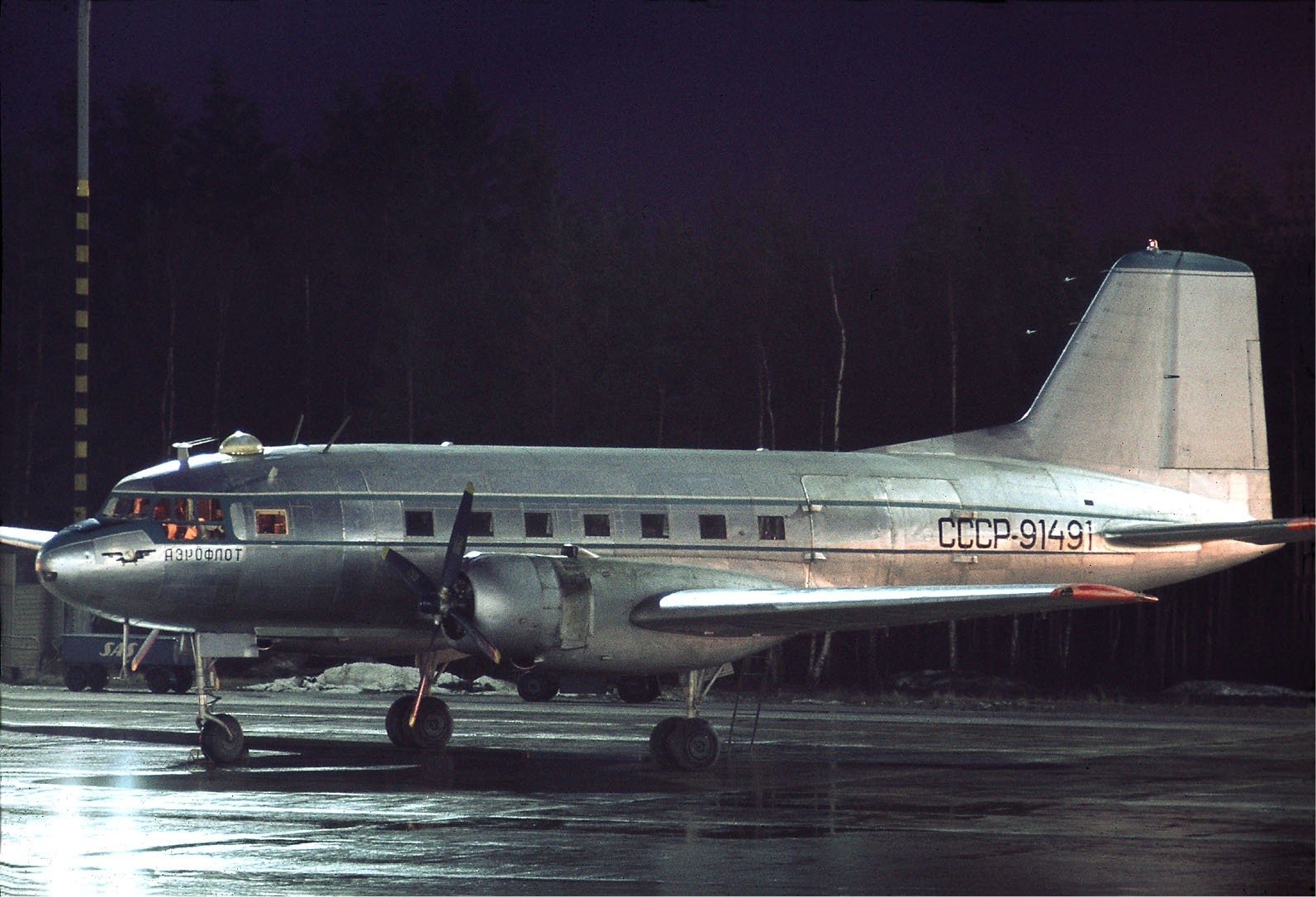
- Il-14G of Aeroflot at Arlanda Airport in 1970

General information
- Type: Airliner, transport aircraft
- National origin: Soviet Union
- Designer: Ilyushin
- Status: Retired
- Primary users: Soviet Air Force Aeroflot; People's Liberation Army Air Force; Egyptian Air Force
- Number built: 1,348

History
- Introduction date: 1954 (Aeroflot)
- First flight: 1 October 1950
- Retired: 1998 (Vietnamese Air Force); 1998 (Syrian Air Force); 2005 (Russian CAA)
- Developed from: Ilyushin Il-12

The Ilyushin Il-14 (NATO reporting name: Crate) is a Soviet twin-engine piston commercial and military personnel and cargo transport aircraft that first flew in 1950, and entered service in 1954. The Il-14 was also manufactured in East Germany by VEB Flugzeugwerke as the VEB 14 and in Czechoslovakia as the Avia 14. The Ilyushin Il-14 was typically replaced by the Antonov An-24 and Yakovlev Yak-40.

== Design and development ==
The Il-14 was developed as a replacement for the widespread Douglas DC-3 and its Soviet built version, the Lisunov Li-2. A development of the earlier Ilyushin Il-12 (that first flew in 1945), the Il-14 was intended for use in both military and civil applications. The Il-12 had major problems with poor engine-out behaviour. Also, it had less payload capability than was originally planned (although the Il-12 was intended to carry 32 passengers, in service it only carried 18, which was uneconomical).

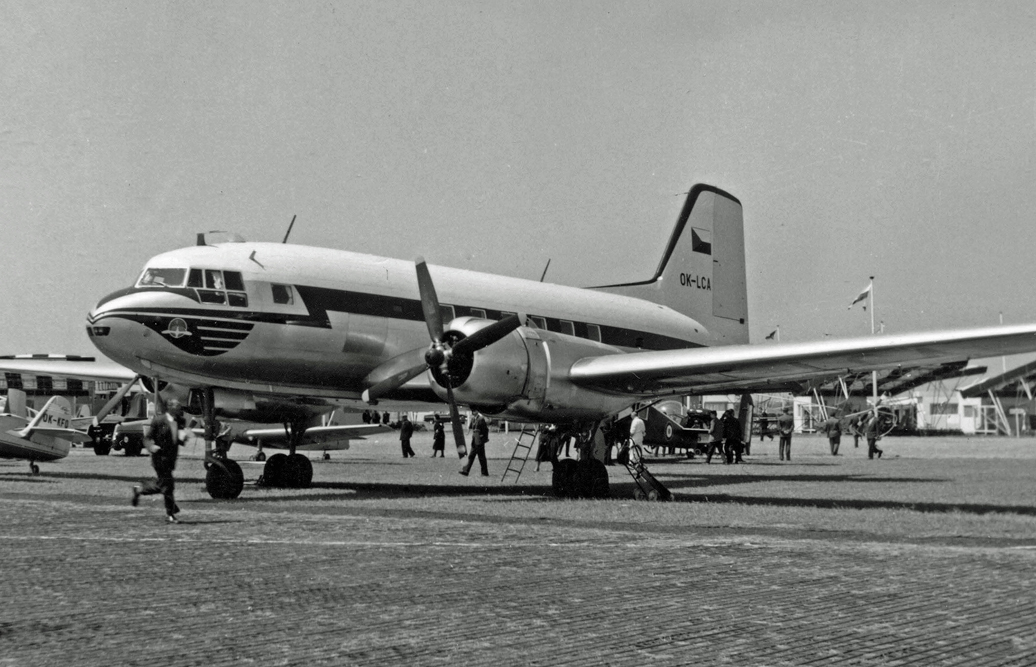
An Avia 14T of CSA displayed at the 1957 Paris Air Show

The development into the Il-14 was a vast improvement over the Il-12, with a new wing and a broader tailfin. It was powered by two 1,400 kW (1,900 hp) Shvetsov ASh-82T-7 radial piston engines. These changes greatly improved aerodynamic performance in engine-out conditions.

Total production of the Il-14 was 1,345 aircraft: 1,065 in Moscow (Moscow Machinery Plant Nr.30) from 1956 to 1958 and Tashkent (Factory Nr.84) from 1954 to 1958. Licensed production of 80 in East Germany by VEB Flugzeugwerke Dresden (FWD) from 1956 to 1959 and 203 in Czechoslovakia by Avia in Prague, from 1956 to 1960. It was rugged and reliable, and thus was widely used in rural areas with poor quality airfields.

The type was also used by the East German aircraft industry as a test aircraft for the horizontal stabilizer of the Baade 152.

== Variants ==
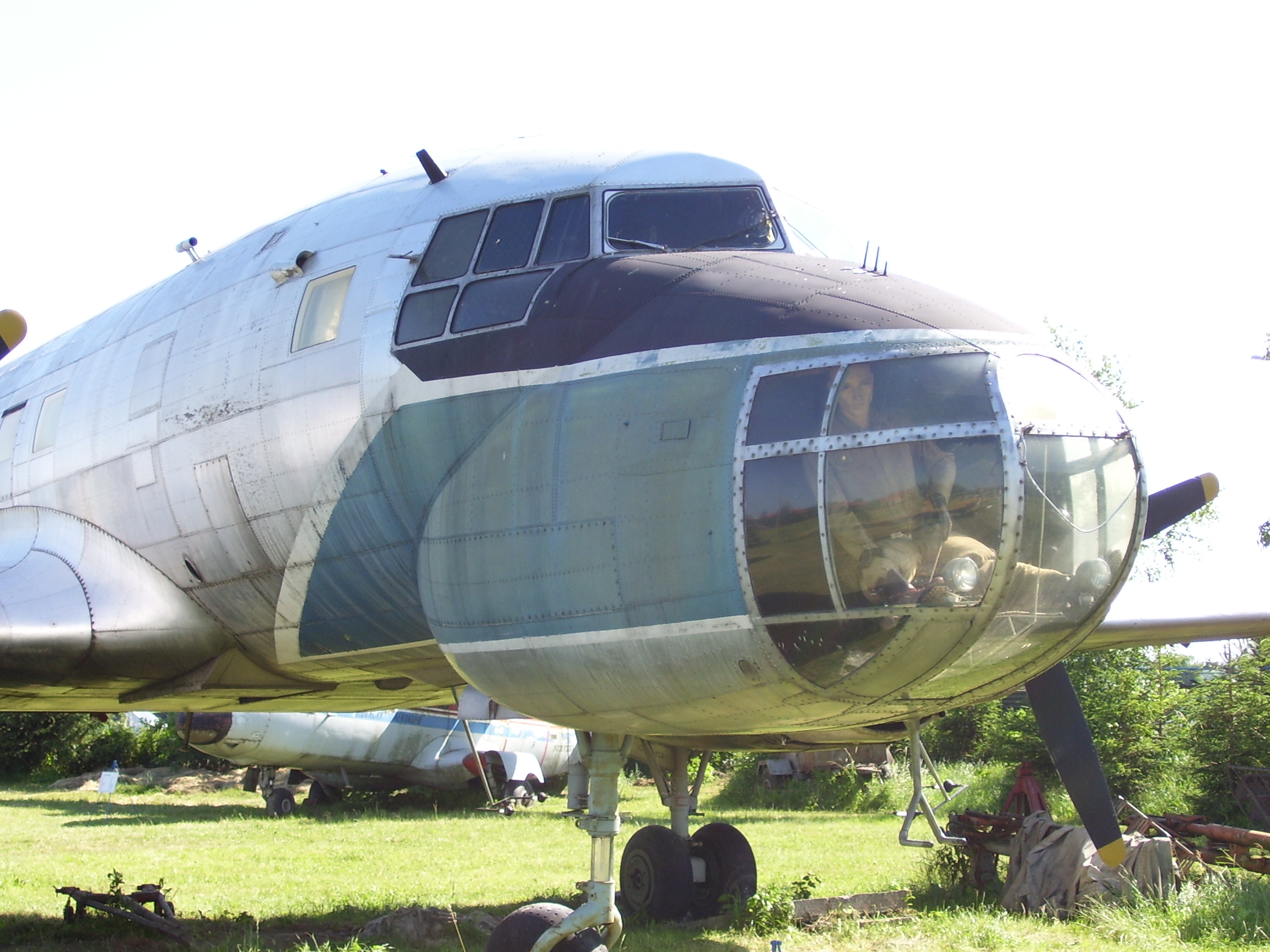
An Avia 14FG at Czech Museum Kunovice

- Il-14 : Twin-engined passenger, cargo transport aircraft.
- Il-14FK / 14FKM : Aerial photography version.
- Il-14G : Freight or cargo aircraft.
- Il-14GGO : Geophysical research version.
- Il-14LIK-1 / LIK-2: Navigation aid calibration version, based on the Il-14M.
- Il-14LR : Ice reconnaissance version.
- Il-14M : Stretched Il-14P, fitted with a lengthened fuselage, 14–36 seat.
- Il-14P : Airliner version, 18–32 seat.
- Il-14PS / S : VIP versions, based on Il-14P.
  - Il-14SI: Extended-range VIP version.
  - Il-14SO: 18-seat VIP version.
- Il-14RR: Fisheries reconnaissance version.
- Il-14T : Military transport version.
  - Il-14TB: Glider tug.
  - Il-14TD: Paratroop/assault transport.
  - Il-14TS: Medevac version.
  - Il-14TG: Cargo freighter.
- Crate-C : Electronic warfare version.

=== License-built variants ===
- Avia 14 : Ilyushin Il-14Ms built by Avia under licence in Czechoslovakia.
  - Avia 14-24 : 24-seat version.
  - Avia 14-32 : 32-seat version.
  - Avia 14-40 : 40-seat version.
- Avia 14FG : Aerial survey aircraft.
- Avia 14T : Avia-built Ilyushin Il-14T.
- Avia 14S : VIP transport aircraft with six individual seats and a six-seat couch, can be fitted with long-range wing-tip fuel tanks.
- Avia 14 Super : 1960-model with a pressurized cabin for 32, 36, or 42 passengers, fitted with long-range wing-tip fuel tanks.
- VEB 14P : Ilyushin Il-14Ps built by VVB Flugzeugbau under license in East Germany.
- VEB 14T : VEB 14Ps converted to military transports.
- Y-6 : Projected Chinese production version. Aborted after Y-7 development began.

== Operators ==
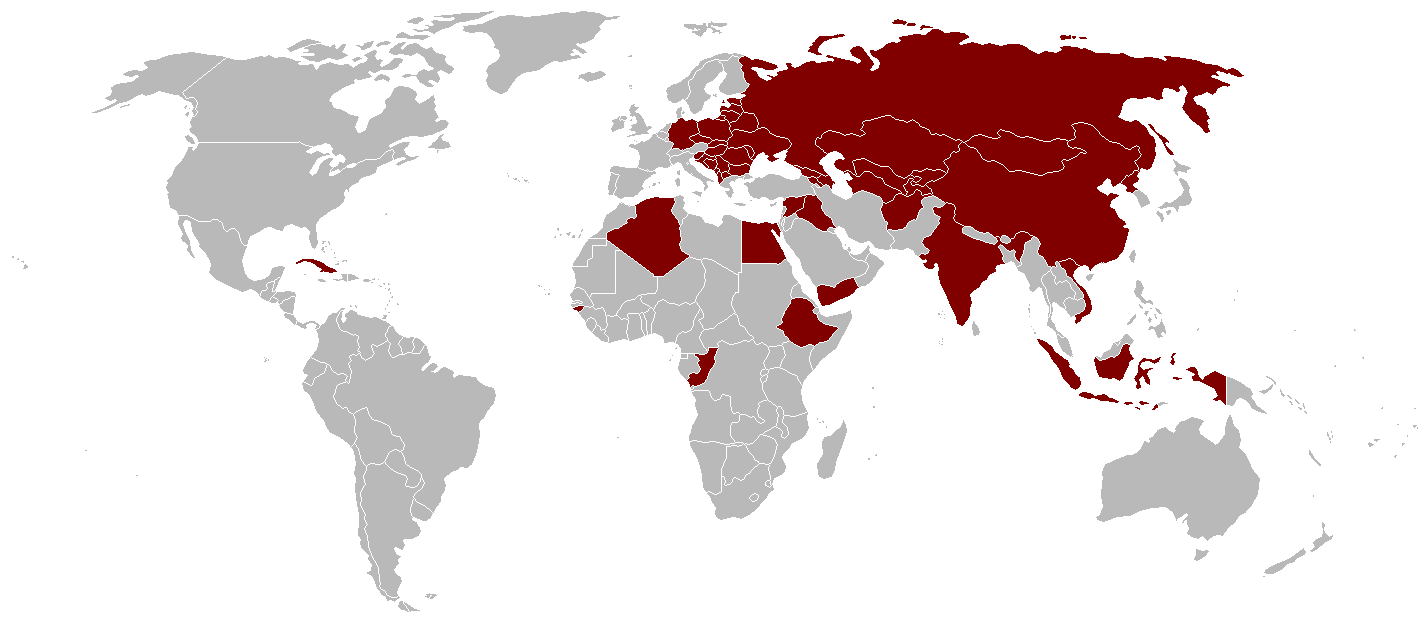
Countries which have operated the Il-14

The Il-14 operated in the Soviet Union until the 1980s and early 90s, and other nations like Cuba and Vietnam. However, the unlicensed Chinese built Y-6 remained in the People's Liberation Army Air Force as a trainer until the late 1980s.

=== Military operators ===
There are no current military operators of the Ilyushin Il-14. All operators listed below are former operators.

- Afghanistan: Afghan Air Force. 26 were supplied to the Afghan Air Force from 1955 onwards. By 1979, the force was reduced to 10, equipping a single squadron.
- Albania: Albanian Air Force. In 1957, one Il-14M was delivered, and the interior became splendid, and it became a presidential aircraft. The aircraft operated in Lapraka or Laprakë, once known as Tirana Aerodrome, the former airport of Albania's capital by 1979, after which it was transferred to Rinas Airport (current international airport). In addition, one Il-14M, one Avia 14T and one VFB Il-14P were introduced. Used for transport duties with the 7594th Aviation Regiment. It was eventually retired in 2002 due to lack of parts. The Ilyushin Il-14 was operated by Albanian Aviation Regiment 4020.
- Algeria: Algerian Air Force. 12 were delivered to them from 1962, with the last phased out in 1997. Only four were operational by 1979.
- Bulgaria: Bulgarian Air Force. 20 were delivered from 1960, including Il-14M and East Germany built Il-14P examples. The Il-14P was retired by 1974, and only 4 Il-14M remained by 1979.
- Cambodia

The Cambodian Air Force operated 2 Il-14s in 1968.

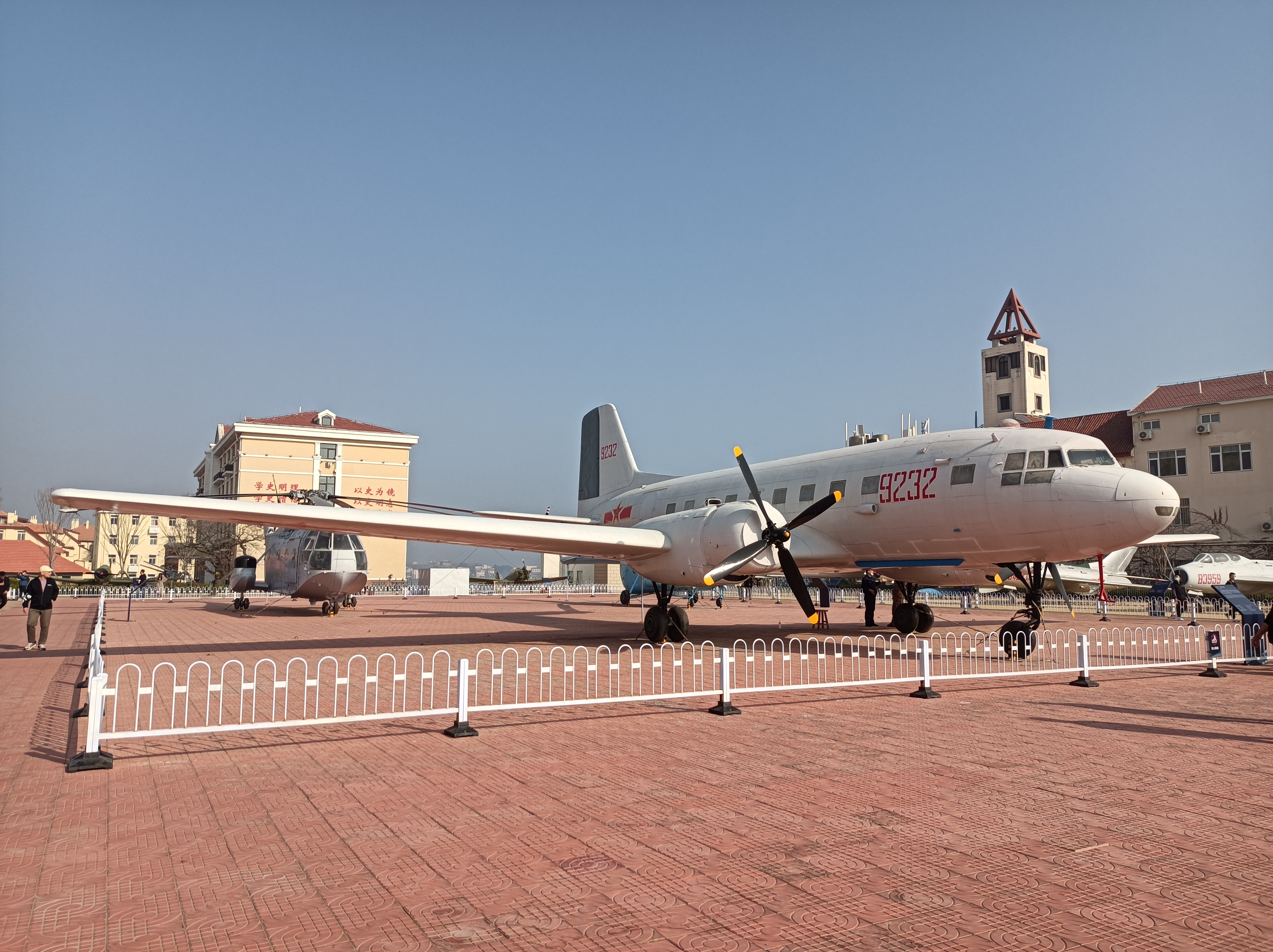
PLA Navy Il-14 at a museum display

- China: More than 50 have been operated by the People's Liberation Army Air Force from 1955, mostly of the Il-14M (local produced Y-6 did not materialize). Some have been reported in use by the People's Liberation Army Navy as well. Final examples were withdrawn by the late 1990s.
- Republic of the Congo: Congolese Air Force. 5 were delivered from 1960 and remained in service until 1997. All were reported on strength in 1979.
- Cuba: Cuban Air Force.20 Il-14Ts were introduced in 1961 and used until 1992.

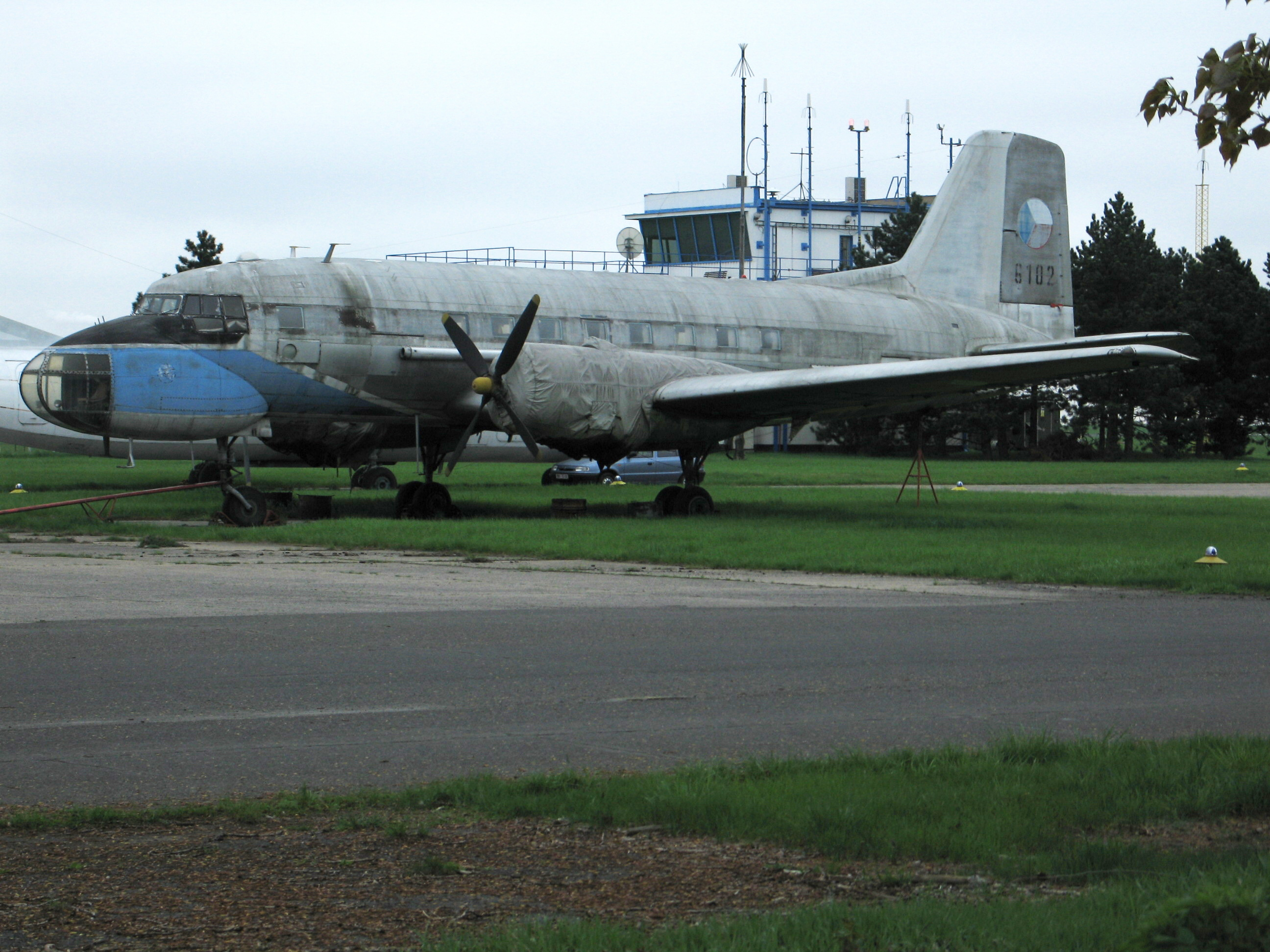
Czechoslovak-made Ilyushin Il-14

- Czechoslovakia: Czechoslovak Air Force. 50 were operated from 1958, though most were locally built examples delivered from 1968. Most were retired prior to the split of Czechoslovakia, though a small number may have served briefly with its successor states.
- East Germany: East German Air Force. 30 were delivered, beginning with 11 Ilyushin built aircraft from 1956 and deliveries of East Germany built aircraft commencing the following year and totaling 19 examples. 20 remained by 1979, and all were withdrawn by 1990, with none being passed on to the unified German Luftwaffe.
- Egypt: Egyptian Air Force. 70 were operated by the Egyptian Air Force from 1955. Most were Soviet built models, but at least one East Germany built Il-14P was delivered in 1957. A number of aircraft were destroyed during fighting with Israel, but 26 survived to the peace of 1979. Acquisition of Western aircraft from then on led to the retirement of the Il-14 by 1994.
- Ethiopia: Ethiopian Air Force. 2 were acquired in 1965, with one remaining in service by 1979 and finally retired by 1994.
- Guinea-Bissau: 4 were in operation in 1979.
- Hungary: Hungarian Air Force. Two Il-14Ps were operated from 1959 to 1976.
- India: Indian Air Force. 26 were delivered from 1955 but were withdrawn by 1979.

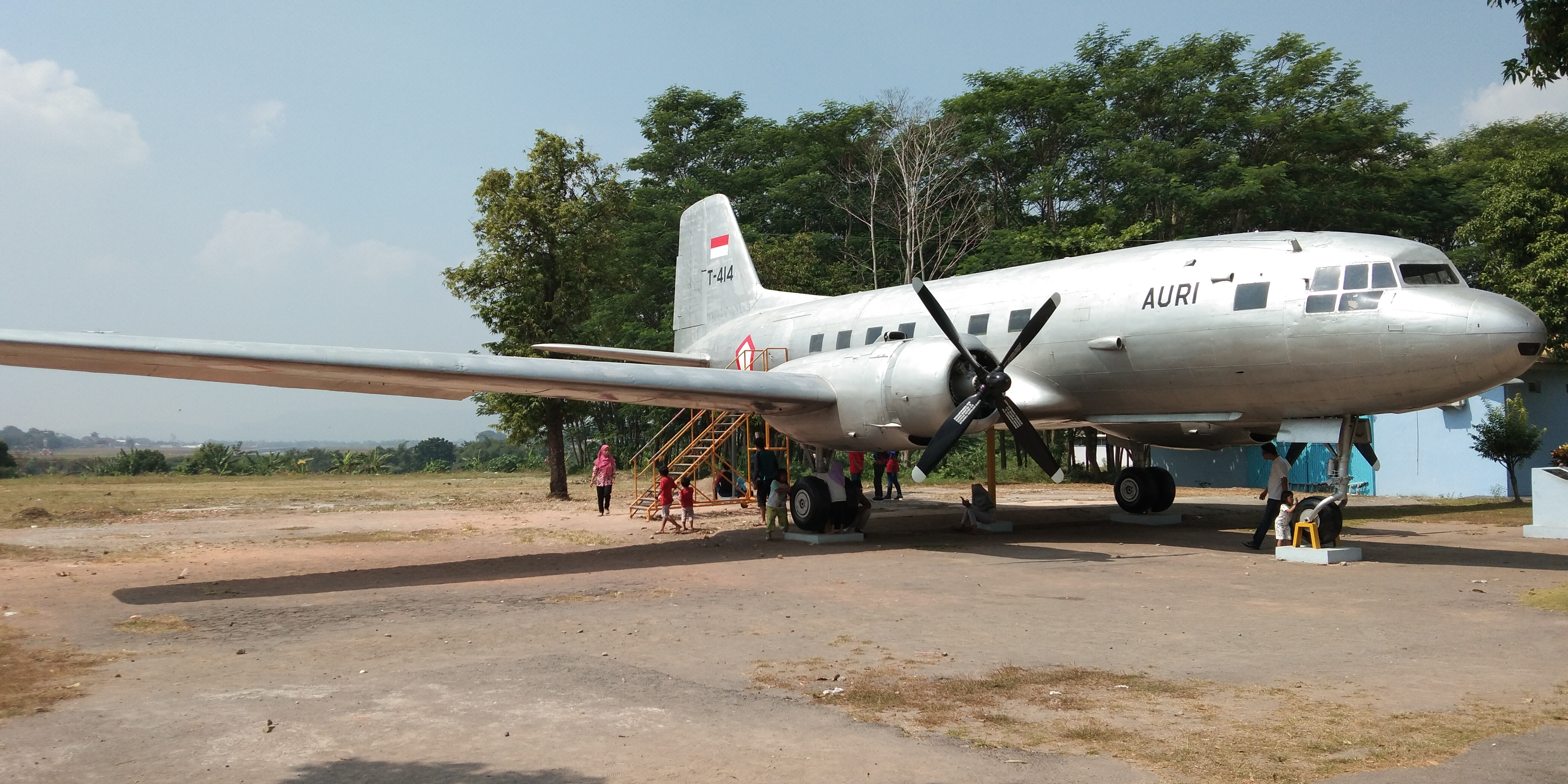
Indonesian Air Force Ilyushin Il-14

- Indonesia: Indonesian Air Force. 22 were delivered from 1957 and withdrawn by 1975.
- Iraq: Iraqi Air Force. 13 Il-14M were delivered in 1958, with 3 remaining by 1979. The last aircraft were withdrawn after the first Gulf War.
- Khmer Republic: Khmer Air Force
- Mali: 2
- Mongolia: Mongolian People's Air Force. 7 were delivered from 1956, with 6 remaining in service by until 1974.
- North Korea: North Korean Air Force. About 15 have been operated from 1958 with fewer than 10 in service by 1979 and the last withdrawn by 1998.
- North Yemen: North Yemen Air Force. 6 or more were delivered from 1958, with a single example flying in 1979. This was passed on to the unified Yemen.

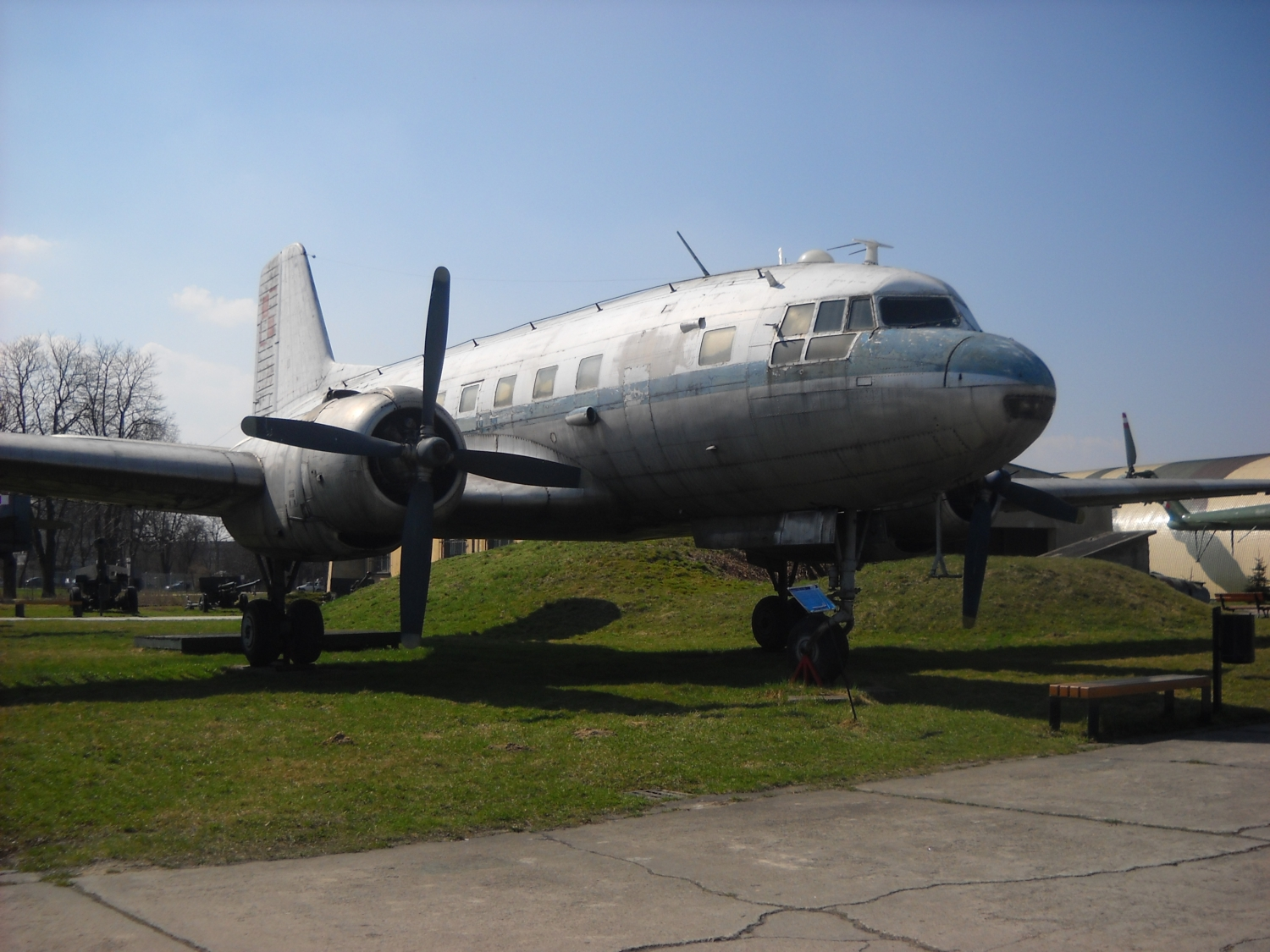
Stored Polish Air Force VEB Il-14S in Polish Aviation Museum in Kraków, 3 April 2011

- Poland: Polish Air Force. 12 or more served from 1955, including Soviet built Il-14P, Il-14S, and Il-14T, as well as East Germany built Il-14P and Il-14T models. These served until the 1980s.
- Romania: Romanian Air Force. 33 were delivered from 1955, including 30 East Germany built Il-14P models as well as 3 Il-14M aircraft delivered in 1961. Only 4 remained in service by 1979, with the last Il-14M being retired in 1983. None remained in service by 1993.
- South Yemen: South Yemen Air Force. 4 were delivered from 1966, serving as late as 1988.
- Soviet Union: Soviet Air Force and Soviet Naval Aviation. Serving from 1954, 235 were in service in 1979.
- Syria: Syrian Air Force. 16 were delivered from 1957, with 8 remaining in service by 1979. Final examples were in service as late as 1998.

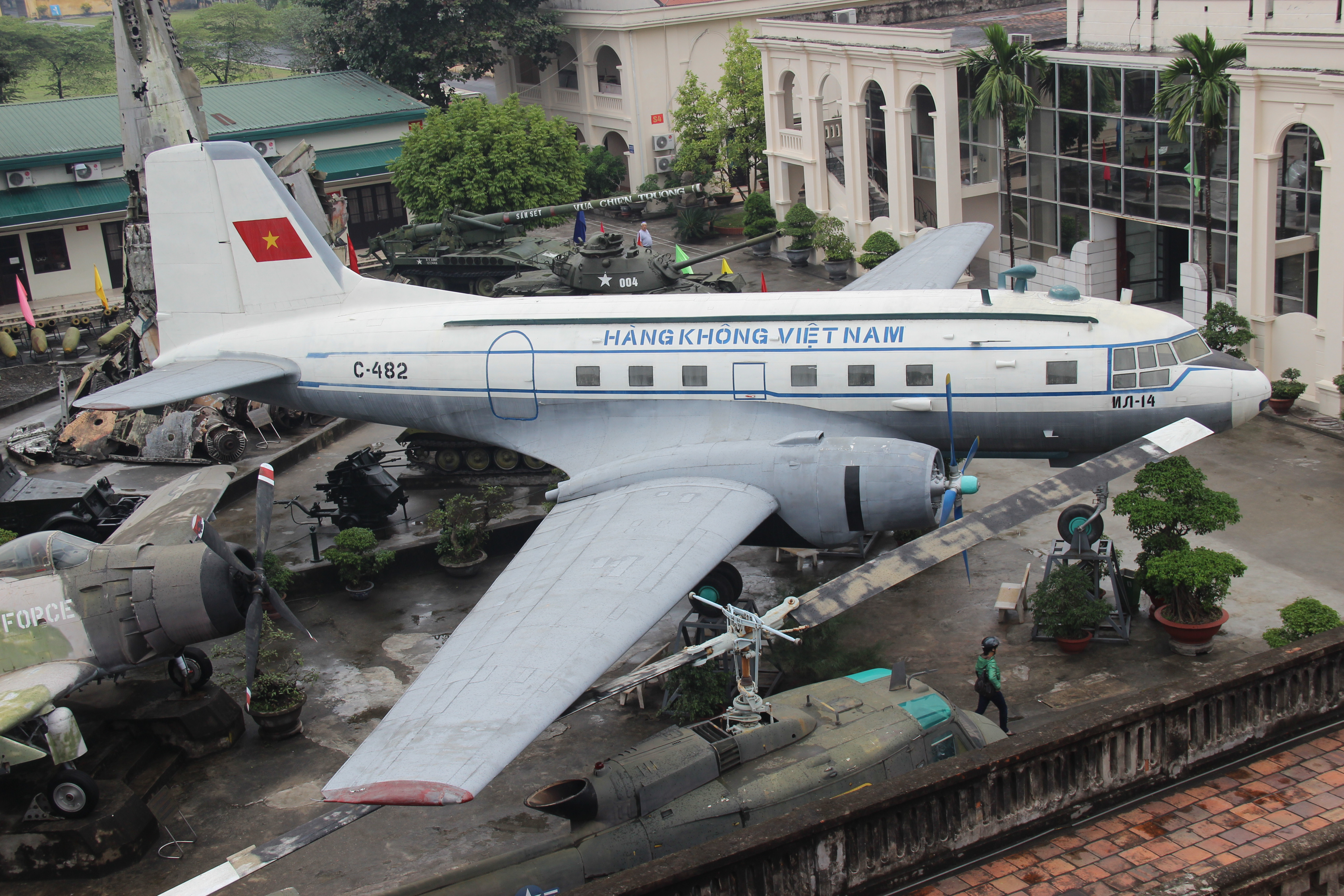
Ilyushin Il-14 on display at Vietnam Military History Museum

- Vietnam: Vietnam People's Air Force. 45 were delivered from 1958, with 12 remaining in service by 1979. None remained in service by 1998.
- Yemen: Yemen Air Force. 1 was inherited from North Yemen in 1990, serving for a short time before being retired.
- Yugoslavia: SFR Yugoslav Air Force. One Il-14P was presented by Soviet prime minister Nikita Khrushchev to prime minister Josip Broz Tito in 1956. Six others were given to the Air Force by Yugoslav Airlines in 1963. and were used until 1974. The one presented to Tito is preserved in the Museum of Yugoslav Aviation in Belgrade.

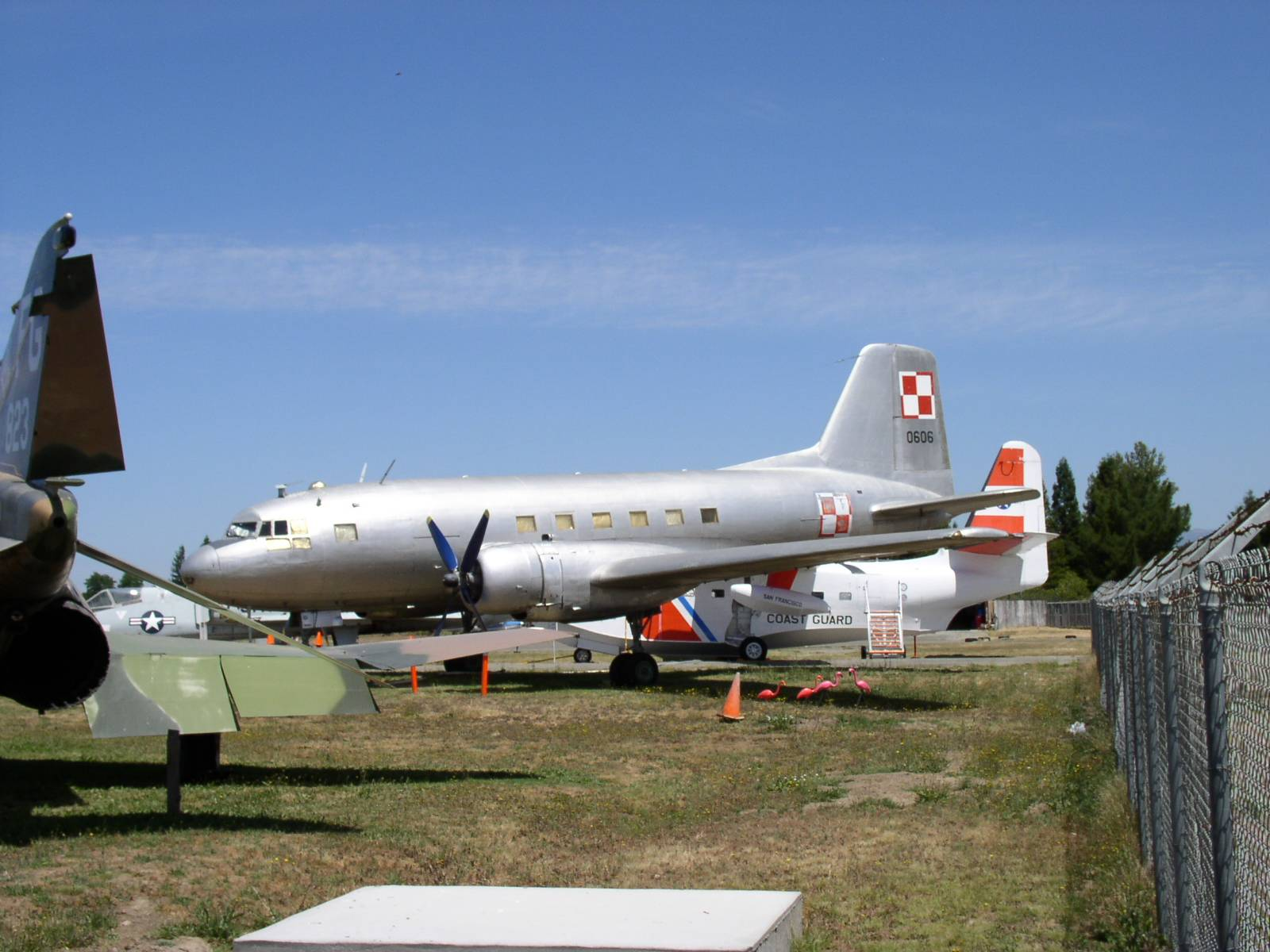
Polish Air Force Ilyushin Il-14

=== Civil operators ===
Very few examples remain airworthy, with some still in use for freight duties, and a handful maintained by aviation clubs and enthusiasts. Today only three aircraft remain airworthy in Russia: one, called "Soviet Union" at Gorelovo airfield near St. Petersburg, another, called "Penguin" has performed its maiden flight after restoration in 2012 and now is based at Stupino airfield near Moscow. The third aircraft, called "The Blue Dream" performed its maiden flight from Tushino airfield to Stupino airfield in May 2014 after more than 10 years repair performed by a team of aero enthusiasts. There was also one Il-14 that was possibly airworthy in the United States, but its registration was cancelled in July 2014.

Bulgaria

- Balkan Bulgarian Airlines
- TABSO

China

- CAAC
- Shanxi Airlines
- Wuhan Airlines
- Zhongyuan Airlines

Cuba

- Aerocaribbean
- Cubana – One example is displayed at the Museo del Aire (Cuba)

Czechoslovakia

- ČSA Czechoslovak Airlines
- Government of Czechoslovakia

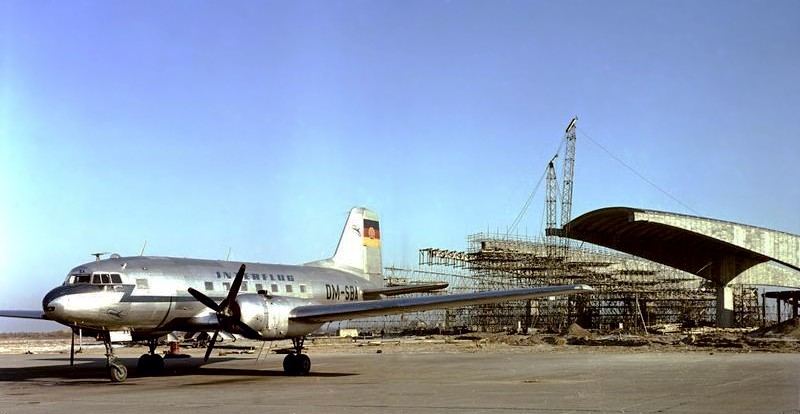
1961 photograph of an Ilyushin Il-14 operated by East-German airline Interflug

East Germany

- Deutsche Lufthansa
- Interflug

Guinea

- Air Guinée - Aero Av.14.

Hungary

- Malev – 10 were operated in Hungary from 1956, two of them by the Hungarian government, eight of them by Malév Hungarian Airlines. The first three of Malév's planes were built in the Soviet Union, with the remaining five Il-14P produced by East Germany. Malév's planes remained operational until 1970, the two planes of the government were retired in 1978. All the Hungarian Il-14 were sold to the Soviet Union for use by the Arctic aviation, where the last one was withdrawn from service in December 1990.

Iran

- Iran Air

Mali

- Air Mali

Mongolia

- MIAT Mongolian Airlines – UVS-MNR Air Mongol

North Korea

- Air Koryo – one Il-14 still exists possibly in airworthy condition in the colours of Air Koryo.

Poland

- Polskie Linie Lotnicze LOT – operated 20 aircraft between 1955 and 1974. One aircraft was used for airfield navaid calibration through the 1980s.

Romania

- TAROM

Soviet Union

- Aeroflot

Vietnam
Vietnam Civil Aviation Department – later as Vietnam Civil Aviation (now Vietnam Airlines)
Yemen

- Yemen Airlines

Yugoslavia

- JAT – Yugoslav Airlines purchased six Il-14M aircraft in 1957. They were withdrawn in 1963 because they were not as profitable as the Convair CV-440, used by JAT in this period. They were given to the Yugoslav Air Force after the purchase of the Sud Aviation Caravelle and were used until 1974.

== Specifications (Il-14M) ==
Ilyushin Il-14

Data from The Encyclopedia of World Aircraft

General characteristics

- Crew: 4
- Capacity: 24-32 passengers with flight attendant
- Length: 22.3 m (73 ft 2 in)
- Wingspan: 31.7 m (104 ft 0 in)
- Height: 7.9 m (25 ft 11 in)
- Wing area: 99.7 m^{2} (1,073 sq ft)
- Airfoil: TsAGI SR-5
- Empty weight: 12,600 kg (27,778 lb)
- Max takeoff weight: 18,000 kg (39,683 lb)
- Powerplant: 2 × Shvetsov ASh-82T 14-cylinder air-cooled radial piston engines, 1,417 kW (1,900 hp) each
- Propellers: 4-bladed constant-speed propellers

Performance

- Maximum speed: 417 km/h (259 mph, 225 kn)
- Range: 1,305 km (811 mi, 705 nmi)
- Service ceiling: 7,400 m (24,300 ft)
- Rate of climb: 5 m/s (980 ft/min)

== See also ==
- Military transport aircraft

Related development

- Ilyushin Il-12

Related lists

- List of civil aircraft

== Sources ==
- Ogden, Bob (2008). Aviation Museums and Collections of The Rest of the World. UK: Air-Britain. ISBN 978-0-85130-394-9
- "Pentagon Over the Islands: The Thirty-Year History of Indonesian Military Aviation". Air Enthusiast Quarterly. No. 2. n.d. pp. 154–162. ISSN 0143-5450.
- Zídek, Petr (1999). "Čechoslováci v Guineji". Letectví + Kosmonautika (in Czech). No. 6. pp. 353–. ISSN 0024-1156.
