= Ilyushin Il-12 =

1940s Soviet twin-engine transport aircraft

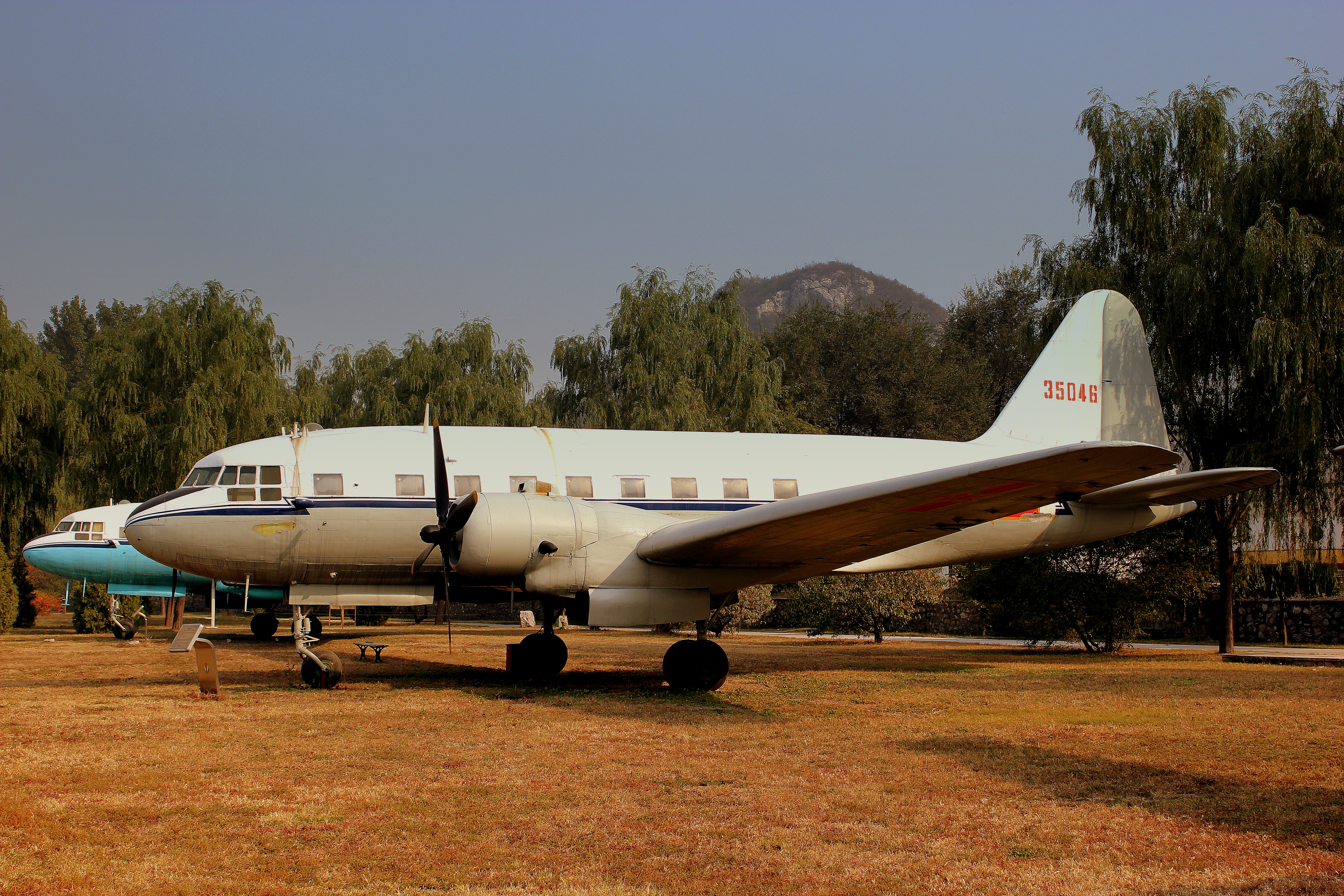
- Ilyushin Il-12 at China Aviation Museum, Beijing

General information
- Type: Transport aircraft
- Designer: Ilyushin
- Status: Retired
- Primary user: Aeroflot
- Number built: 663

History
- Manufactured: 1946-1949
- Introduction date: 1947
- First flight: 15 August 1945
- Retired: 1986 (China)
- Developed into: Ilyushin Il-14

The Ilyushin Il-12 (NATO reporting name: Coach) is a Soviet twin-engine cargo aircraft, developed in the mid-1940s for small and medium-haul airline routes and as a military transport.

== Design and development ==
The Il-12 was developed as a private venture by the Ilyushin Design Bureau from autumn 1943 and was intended as a replacement for the Lisunov Li-2, a license-produced version of the Douglas DC-3. Initial studies proposed a 29-seat airliner powered by four 1,000 hp (750 kW) supercharged M-88V engines (as used in the Ilyushin Il-4 bomber) and with a pressurized cabin, allowing the aircraft to cruise at an altitude of 6,000–7,000 m (20,000–23,000 ft), with a range of 5,000 km (3,100 mi) at almost 400 km/h (250 mph). The aircraft would be fitted with a tricycle landing gear, the first use by the Ilyushin OKB.

During 1944, the design was changed, with the M-88B engines replaced by two ACh-31 diesel V-12 engines (each producing 1,900 hp (1,400 kW) at take-off). The plans for a pressurized fuselage were abandoned and the number of passengers reduced to 27. The lower operating altitude resulted in a reduction in the aircraft's range and cruising speed. The Il-12 made its maiden flight on 15 August 1945. It was soon decided to re-engine the aircraft with Shvetsov ASh-82 radial engines, as it was expected to take too long to develop the ACh-31 to an acceptable reliability and time between overhauls for commercial service. The modified first prototype flew with its new engines on 9 January 1946.

The Il-12 was found to have problems with vibration during testing, having poor engine out characteristics and requiring a strut under the rear fuselage to prevent tipping during loading due to centre-of-gravity problems. However, factory test pilots praised the quality of the new aircraft, with much better performance and handling than the Li-2, which contributed to the decision to launch the Il-12 in series production. One problem was the use of magnesium near the engines which, in case of engine fire, could cause an uncontrolled fire, damaging the wing structure. This was revealed by a crash of an Ilyushin Il-12 near Voronezh in 1949 which killed all on board, following an engine fire. Subsequently, as a result of the accident investigation, the magnesium was replaced by aluminium alloys and the fire extinguishing system was redesigned. In addition, the aircraft's takeoff weight was restricted to ease the hazard of an engine failure during take-off - this in turn reduced the aircraft's passenger capacity, which was temporarily limited to 18.

The Il-12 was a low-wing cantilever monoplane, with a single fin and rudder and a retractable tricycle undercarriage. It was powered by two Shvetsov ASh-82FN radial engines, rated at 1,850 hp (1,380 kW) for take-off and 1,630 hp (1,220 kW) at 1,550 m (5,090 ft), driving four-bladed propellers. The fuselage had a considerable volume, and was equipped with eight rectangular windows on each side. The crew consisted of three and the aircraft could transport 32 soldiers, 32 parachutists or cargo. There was also a civil version, which although designed to carry up to 32 passengers, was limited in Aeroflot service to 21, with normally only 18 carried. At that passenger load, it meant that use of the Il-12 for passenger use was un-economic.

A total of 663 Il-12s were manufactured. The aircraft was later improved into the Ilyushin Il-14.

== Operational history ==
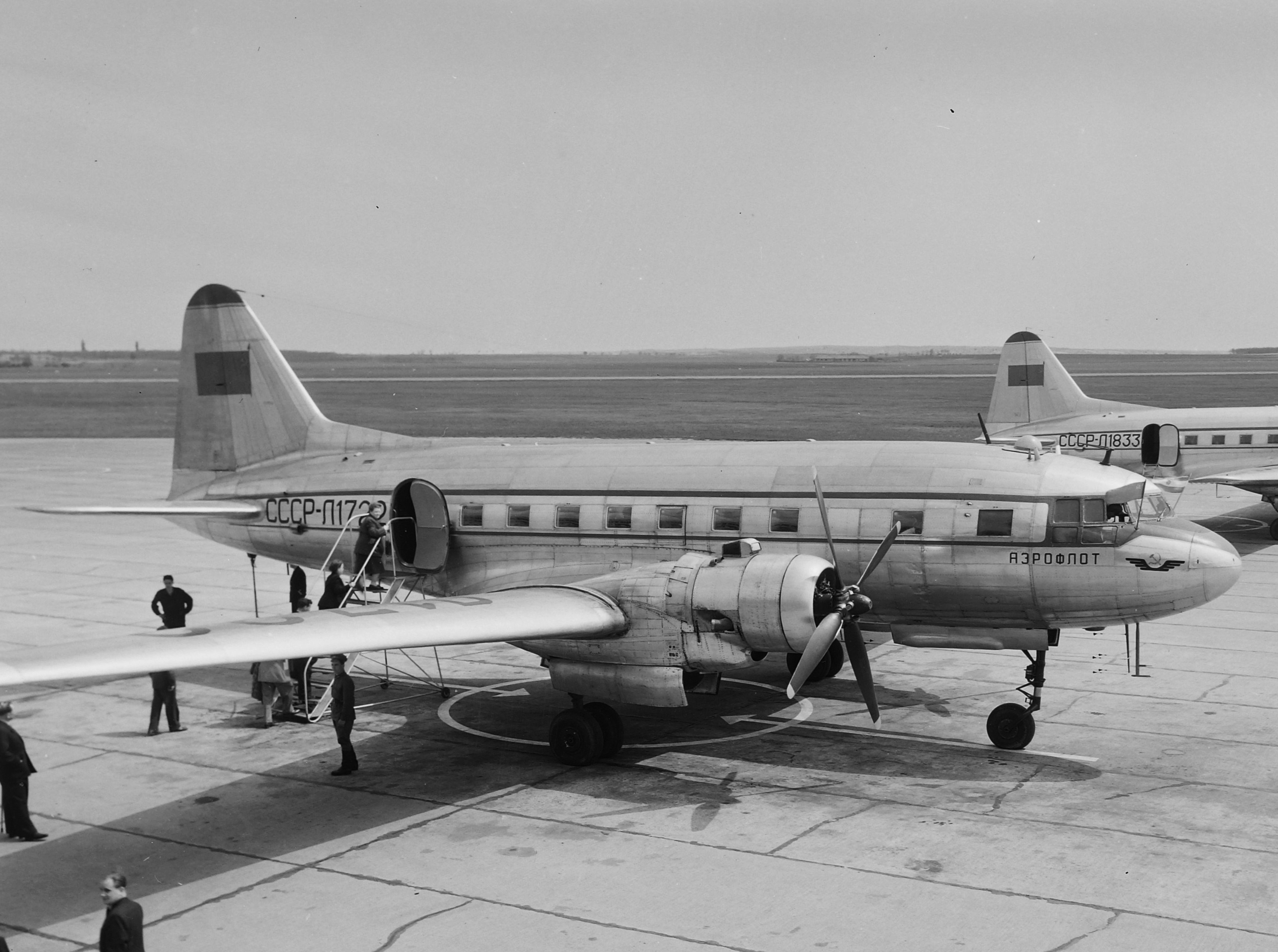
Ilyushin Il-12 of Aeroflot at Budapest Ferihegy Airport, 1956

The Il-12 was revealed to the public on 1 May 1947, when a group of aircraft participated in the annual May Day flyby over Red Square in Moscow. Performance testing was completed by 20 May, and the first regular passenger service by the Il-12 on Aeroflot began in June 1947. The first regular international use of the Il-12 was on the Moscow-Sofia route in 1948. The Il-12 was used on Aeroflot's services to Paris from 1954.

Within the USSR, the Il-12 was placed on Aeroflot's longest route: Moscow-Khabarovsk, with the flight lasting 28 hours, including five refueling stops. From 1956, the Il-12 (modified for use on ice runways) supported the Soviet expeditions to Antarctica. Aeroflot continued to use the Il-12 on some routes until the end of 1970.

=== Export sales ===
The first export customer for the Il-12 was LOT Polish Airlines, who placed an order for five Il-12Bs after it was displayed at the Poznan Fair in Poland in the spring of 1948. This was followed by Czech Airlines, who purchased 10 aircraft from 1949 to 1951, TAROM in Romania from 1949, and at least 20 aircraft to CAAC in China.

== Variants ==
- Il-12A : Basic passenger version with 27 seats standard, also produced in versions with 6, 11, 16, 18, 21 seats.
- Il-12B : Modification from 1948, fitted with an improved de-icing system, lengthened nosewheel and a small dorsal fin fillet.
- Il-12D : military transport version for the Soviet Air Force launched in 1948, for 38 paratroops or military cargo to 3700 kg.
- Il-12P：A 32-seater passenger aircraft type.
- Il-12T : transport version for arctic operations, with a large cargo door on the left side of the fuselage.

== Accidents and incidents ==
Of the 663 Il-12s produced, 56 have been lost in accidents with a total of 465 fatalities.

=== 1940s ===
1 July 1947
An Aeroflot Il-12P (CCCP-Л1317) crashed on takeoff from Vnukovo Airport due to loss of speed following unexplained engine failure, killing four of six on board.

19 September 1947
An Aeroflot Il-12P (CCCP-Л1332) was struck by a crashing North American B-25 (CCCP-И850) that had lost control during an emergency landing at Vnukovo Airport; both aircraft burned out, but there were no casualties.

24 November 1947
An Aeroflot Il-12P (CCCP-Л1356) overran the runway on takeoff from Koltsovo Airport; all six crew survived. The aircraft was overloaded by 330 kg (728 lb) and had not been properly de-iced.

1 December 1947
A Polyarnaya Aviatsiya Il-12 (CCCP-Н439) was on an unauthorized positioning flight from Kimry to Moscow when it force-landed near Taldom (27 km (17 mi) south of Borki Airfield) after the left engine lost power due to an oil leak; all five crew survived.

18 December 1947
Aeroflot Flight 6, an Il-12P (CCCP-Л1343), stalled and crashed near Severny Airport while attempting to land following a go-around due to engine failure, killing seven of 25 on board.

2 September 1948
An Aeroflot Il-12 (CCCP-Л1465) crashed on takeoff from Severny Airport after entering a descent when the flight engineer reduced engine power; a propeller blade broke off and penetrated the fuselage, killing one of 20 on board.

9 September 1948
An Aeroflot Il-12 (CCCP-Л1427) crashed near Baimakovo Aerodrome during a training flight following a loss of control, killing all four crew. The pilot was practicing flying with one engine out. The instructor feathered the propeller too soon after a go-around with the flaps deployed and the aircraft entered a banking turn with a loss of airspeed. Control was lost and the aircraft entered a dive.

12 October 1948
An Aeroflot Il-12 (CCCP-Л1450) disappeared over the Caucasus Mountains near Yevlakh with ten on board. After arriving at Baku, the flight was unable to continue to Tbilisi due to bad weather. The next day the aircraft left for Tbilisi, but the crew failed to check weather conditions along the flight route. The aircraft climbed to 3,000 m (9,800 ft). En route the aircraft encountered navigation problems due to poor reception of radio beacons. The crew then decided to return to Baku but never made it. Last radio contact was near Yevlakh; the aircraft has never been found.

23 December 1948
An Aeroflot Il-12P (CCCP-Л1731) collided in mid-air near Valuyevo with an Aeroflot TS-62 (CCCP-Л861) that was being ferried from Vnukovo Airport to Bykovo Airport, killing all 12 on board both aircraft. The brand-new Il-12 was being handed over to a crew from Aeroflot's Georgian division, but when the crew failed to turn up in time, the aircraft was then handed over to a crew from the Uzbek division instead. The Il-12 then departed for Tashkent via Lyubertsy, although ATC did not know the change in the flight plan and assumed the Il-12 was going to land at Vnukovo. The Il-12 collided with the TS-62, breaking off both engines while the tail of the TS-62 was sheared off. ATC errors were blamed.

19 January 1949
An Aeroflot Il-12P (CCCP-Л1381) crashed shortly after takeoff from Stalino Airport (now Donetsk Airport) due to loss of altitude following engine problems, killing eight of nine on board; two people also died when the aircraft crashed into a house.

13 May 1949
Aeroflot Flight 17, an Il-12P (CCCP-Л1791), crashed during descent to Novosibirsk in bad weather due to loss of control following a lightning strike, killing all 25 on board.

21 July 1949
Aeroflot Flight 5, an Il-12P (CCCP-Л1714), crashed and burned in a forest near Marga while attempting a forced landing following an engine fire, killing 13 of 14 on board.

20 August 1949
An Aeroflot Il-12 (CCCP-Л1434) crashed near Polukotelnikovo after losing altitude in a downdraft, killing eight of 11 on board.

25 August 1949
An Aeroflot Il-12P (CCCP-Л1844) struck Mount Kabanya (20 mi south of Kabansk) following an unexplained descent from 2,400 m (7,874 ft) to 1,200 m (3,900 ft), killing all 14 on board.

20 September 1949
An Aeroflot Il-12 (CCCP-Л1462) crashed near Savasleyka while attempting a forced landing following engine failure, killing three of four crew.

=== 1950s ===
19 July 1950
An Aeroflot Il-12P (CCCP-Л1340) struck the top of a 175 m (574 ft) hill and crashed near Tbilisi Airport during a training flight after the pilot deviated from the glide scope and approach pattern, killing four of 11 on board; on board were six unauthorized passengers, all Tbilisi Airport employees. The hill that the aircraft hit was not indicated on the flight map.

30 July 1950
An Aeroflot Il-12P (CCCP-Л1803) crashed shortly after takeoff from Karaganda Airport due to loss of control following engine failure, killing all 25 on board. Six minutes after takeoff the crew radioed that engine number one had failed and that they were returning to the airport. While turning for final approach, the aircraft turned left (in the direction of the failed engine) and lost speed while lowering the landing gear. Control was lost and the aircraft spiraled down and crashed. The left engine was having problems before and after maintenance, but the crew operating the test flight failed to report the problem.

11 August 1950
Aeroflot Flight 8, an Il-12P (CCCP-Л1706), struck trees and crashed in a meadow while on approach to Koltsovo Airport in fog after descending below the glide scope due to pilot error, killing two of five crew; all 22 passengers survived.

9 January 1951
An Aeroflot Il-12P (CCCP-Л1811) crashed in the Black Sea off Tuapse following a fuel tank explosion and fire due to a lightning strike, killing all eight on board. The storm that the crew flew into was not forecast and a storm warning was issued some 40 minutes after the crash.

13 March 1951
An Aeroflot Il-12P (CCCP-Л1319) crashed near Koltsovo Airport following a loss of altitude during approach; there were no casualties.

29 March 1951
An Aeroflot Il-12P (CCCP-Л1313) crashed near Vnukovo Airport during a test flight following multiple diversions due to spatial disorientation caused by a malfunctioning radio compass, killing three of four crew; all four passengers survived.

14 November 1951
An Aeroflot Il-12P (CCCP-Л1360) crashed shortly after takeoff from Nikolayevsk-on-Amur following a loss of altitude due to pilot error; all 19 on board survived. The aircraft took off with moist snow on the fuselage that had accumulated during taxiing and engine tests. A late and slow takeoff caused the aircraft to vibrate and the flight engineer mistook the vibration for a rough-running engine and overfueled the left engine, and it lost power. Altitude was lost and the aircraft crashed.

17 November 1951
An Aeroflot Il-12P (CCCP-Л1775) lost control and crashed shortly after takeoff from Novosibirsk Severny Airport due to wing icing, killing all 23 on board.

21 February 1952
An Aeroflot Il-12 (CCCP-Л1849) crashed shortly after takeoff from Baratayevka Airport during a training flight, killing one of 18 on board. The aircraft took off with the center of gravity too far forward. Due to pilot error, altitude was lost. The pilot attempted to gain altitude, but the propellers had struck the ground. The aircraft bounced twice and after touching the ground a second time, a blade separated from the left propeller and penetrated the fuselage, killing a passenger and seriously injuring another. After repairs, the aircraft returned to service, flying as a cargo freighter until 1964.

5 April 1952
Aeroflot Flight 5, an Il-12P (CCCP-Л1308), lost control and crashed shortly after takeoff from Magdagachi Airport, killing all six on board. A clamp had been left on the left aileron and had not been removed before takeoff.

25 April 1952
An Aeroflot Il-12P (CCCP-Л1312) crashed near Karmanovo during a training flight, killing eight of nine on board. The crew was simulating flying in cloud with the left engine out and its propeller feathered. Airspeed was lost and the aircraft entered a left turn. Two of the crew ran to the rear of the aircraft. The flight engineer attempted to move the propeller to its normal position and increased power to the right engine, but the aircraft crashed. Crew errors were blamed.

18 July 1952
A LOT Polish Airlines Il-12B (SP-LHC) was written off after it crashed on landing at Warsaw.

23 August 1952
An Aeroflot Il-12 (CCCP-Л1488) force-landed near Chlya in a valley between Lake Oryol and Lake Chlya; seventy minutes after takeoff, the crew heard a loud clap and felt a vibration. A portion of a blade on the right propeller had broken off and penetrated the fuselage, severing hydraulic lines, engine control cables and electrical cables. Shrapnel also struck the legs of the flight mechanic and embedded itself in the upper wing of a Po-2 (CCCP-T743) that the aircraft was carrying. The engine began vibrating but the crew could not shut it down nor feather the propeller and a forced landing was made. The flight mechanic later died of blood loss, but there were no other casualties. It was found that while the aircraft was serving with Dalstroi Aviation (as CCCP-X837) the propeller blade had been improperly repaired. The aircraft was repaired and returned to service, flying until 1963.

5 October 1952
Aeroflot Flight 376, an Il-12P (CCCP-Л1328), collided in mid-air near Skvoritsy with Aeroflot Flight 381, a Douglas TS-62 (CCCP-Л1055) due to ATC errors, killing all 24 on board both aircraft.

23 January 1953
Aeroflot Flight 22, an Il-12P (CCCP-Л1435), collided in mid-air shortly after takeoff from Kazan Airport with an Aeroflot Lisunov Li-2 (CCCP-Л4582) due to ATC errors, killing all 11 on board both aircraft.

30 April 1953
Aeroflot Flight 35, an Il-12P (CCCP-Л1777) ditched in the Volga River while on approach to Kazan Airport following double engine failure due to bird strikes (ducks), killing one of 23 on board. During the approach to Kazan, the aircraft flew into a flock of ducks. One duck hit near the windshield, damaging the engine magneto switches and causing a short circuit, after which the engines quit. The propellers could not be feathered because the generator did not supply enough power to the electrical system.

14 June 1953
Aeroflot Flight 229, an Il-12P (CCCP-Л1375), crashed on a hillside 9 mi northeast of Zugdidi due to wing failure after flying into a thunderstorm, killing all 18 on board, including Georgian film actress Nato Vachnadze.

27 July 1953
A Soviet Navy Il-12 was shot down by USAF F-86F Sabre 51-12959 and crashed near Mao-erh-Shan, killing all 21 on board; the Il-12 was the last aircraft destroyed during the Korean War (the armistice was signed later that day). The pilot of the F-86, Ralph Parr, said he identified the aircraft as a North Korean Il-12 and decided to shoot it down. A long burst of gunfire shot down the Il-12, which turned out to be a Soviet Navy transport flying through North Korean airspace to Vladivostok.

14 October 1953
Aeroflot Flight 9, an Il-12P (CCCP-Л1727), stalled and crashed shortly after takeoff from Irkutsk Airport after the pilot mistook inner marker lights for an aircraft approaching head-on, killing four of six crew; all 22 passengers survived.

27 October 1953
Aeroflot Flight 783, an Il-12P (CCCP-Л1765), crashed near Magadan-13 Airport due to wing icing and overloading, killing 22 of 27 on board.

4 November 1953
Aeroflot Flight 5, an Il-12P (CCCP-Л1367), crashed on approach to Magdagachi Airport due to an incorrectly set altimeter, killing the five crew.

July 1954
Flight mechanic V. Polyakov stole an Il-12 at Novosibirsk, intending to ram the house where his unfaithful wife lived. For four hours he circled the city, performing sharp turns around buildings. Two fighters were scrambled and had orders to redirect the Il-12 out of the city and then shoot it down. Polyakov did not follow the fighters and instead after calming down, landed safely at the airport where he was arrested. Although threatened with severe punishment, Polyakov only received three years thanks to a petition from Sergey Ilyushin, who proved that the Il-12 could be safely flown in such extreme conditions.

27 September 1954
Aeroflot Flight 10, an Il-12P (CCCP-Л1365), struck trees and crashed short of the runway at Severny Airport in poor visibility, killing all 29 on board. This accident remains the deadliest involving the Il-12.

28 October 1954
Aeroflot Flight 136, an Il-12P (CCCP-Л1789), disappeared during a Irkutsk-Krasnoyarsk-Moscow flight with 19 (or 20) on board; the aircraft was found by accident in June 1955 on Mount Sivukha, Krasnoyarsk Territory by a hunter. Strong winds had blown the aircraft off course.

5 December 1954
Aeroflot Flight 98, an Il-12P (CCCP-Л1320), crashed at Pervomaiski (4.5 km northwest of Alma-Ata) while attempting an emergency landing following engine problems, killing one of 19 on board. The air self-start valve on cylinder 10 of engine number one burned out due to poor maintenance, but the crew mistook it for an engine fire and shut down the engine. Pilot errors were also blamed.

4 March 1955
A GUSMP Il-12T (CCCP-Н479) crashed during a forced landing near Kepino following an engine fire and resultant separation, killing four of five crew; all 20 passengers survived.

2 July 1955
A Polyarnaya Aviatsiya Il-12 (CCCP-Н480) crashed on landing at Nagurskoye Air Base after touching down on a portion of the runway that had not been cleared of snow, breaking off the left landing gear; no casualties.

9 September 1955
Aeroflot Flight 5, an Il-12P (CCCP-Л1359) crashed near Komarovo due to tail separation and severe turbulence after flying into a thunderstorm, killing all seven on board.

26 April 1956
An Aeroflot aircraft, most likely an Il-12, crashed at Berlin-Bohnsdorf after striking a church tower on approach in fog, killing three of six on board.

8 September 1956
A Polarnaya Aviatsiya Il-12P (CCCP-Н525) undershot the runway during landing at Dikson Airport due to pilot error, breaking off the landing gear; no casualties.

24 November 1956
A CSA Czechoslovak Airlines Il-12B (OK-DBP) crashed in a field at Eglisau (12 km (7.5 mi) from Kloten Airport) while attempting to return to the airport following an engine fire, killing all 23 on board.

7 August 1957
Aeroflot Flight 554, an Il-12P (CCCP-Л1828), crashed short of the runway at Magdagachi Airport after deviating from the approach pattern due to strong winds, killing the pilot.

1 October 1957
Aeroflot Flight 11, an Il-12P (CCCP-Л1389), struck trees and crashed on a hill near Akshi after the crew became disorientated after deviating from the flight route; of the 28 on board, only a passenger survived.

27 October 1957
An Aeroflot Il-12P (CCCP-Н442) struck terrain and crashed at North Pole drifting station SP-7 while flying too low on approach in bad weather; although all six crew survived and were rescued 21 hours after the crash by an Mi-4, the navigator died five days later without regaining consciousness.

18 December 1957
Aeroflot Flight 10, an Il-12P (CCCP-Л1309), disappeared while operating a Khabarovsk-Magdagachi-Moscow passenger service with 27 on board. In June 1958, the burned-out wreckage was found on the western slope of Mount Poktoy (30 km (19 mi) west of Birobidzhan) with no survivors. While parked and during taxiing at Khabarovsk Airport, strong winds damaged the rudder which failed 26 minutes into the flight. Another Il-12 (CCCP-Л1330) that was parked next to CCCP-Л1309 also suffered rudder damage.

9 June 1958
Aeroflot Flight 105, an Il-12P (CCCP-Л1364), struck a hill in bad weather due to pilot error while descending for Magadan-13 Airport, killing all 24 on board.

19 September 1958
An Aeroflot Il-12P (CCCP-Л3904) struck a mountain slope in the Lazo District due to fuel exhaustion after the crew became disorientated in bad weather at night, killing all 28 on board.

15 December 1958
An Aeroflot Il-12 (CCCP-Л1467) overran the runway on landing at Cherepovets Airport after landing late due to pilot error; no casualties.

24 December 1958
An Aeroflot Il-12T (CCCP-Л1458) ran off the runway on takeoff from Uralsk Airport after the flight engineer mistakenly shut down the engines in panic when he thought the aircraft was going to hit a railway embankment; all five crew survived.

9 January 1959
A GUSMP Il-12L (CCCP-04249) crashed short of the runway at Mirny Station, collapsing the landing gear; no casualties. The aircraft was on its first flight after reassembly in Antarctica and was the only Il-12 equipped with ski landing gear.

29 November 1959
An Aeroflot Il-12 (CCCP-01426) crashed at Irkutsk Airport after landing in the grass next to the runway after deviating from the runway centerline, killing the four crew.

=== 1960s ===
7 January 1960
An Aeroflot Il-12 (CCCP-01438) landed hard at Leningrad Airport after the pilot had difficulty locating the reserve runway (the main runway was being cleared of snow); all five crew survived.

21 July 1960
Aeroflot Flight 414, an Il-12P (CCCP-01405), crashed on takeoff at Minsk Airport into a motor depot after failing to lift off due to a waterlogged runway, killing seven of 28 on board; an airport employee also died when he was electrocuted after stepping on a downed power line.

== Operators ==
Bulgaria

- TABSO

Czechoslovakia

- Československé státní aerolinie
- Czechoslovak Air Force

People's Republic of China

- SKOGA
- CAAC Airlines
- People's Liberation Army Air Force - Imported 42 Il-12 airliners from 1950 to 1951 used to airlift to Lhasa during the Annexation of Tibet by the People's Republic of China. Some were refitted to aerial survey airplanes later. Retired in 1986.

Laos

- Pathet Lao

Poland

- LOT Polish Airlines - 5 bought in 1949 (reg. nos: SP-LHA to LHE) plus one (SP-LHF) leased from Czechoslovakia in 1952.
- Polish Air Force

Romania

- TAROM

Mongolia
Soviet Union

- Aeroflot
- Soviet Air Force
- Soviet Navy

North Korea

- Korean Airways

== Specifications (Il-12) ==
Data from The Osprey Encyclopedia of Russian Aircraft from 1875 - 1995

General characteristics

- Crew: 3
- Capacity: 21-32 passengers
- Length: 21.31 m (69 ft 11 in)
- Wingspan: 31.70 m (104 ft 0 in)
- Height: 8.07 m (26 ft 6 in)
- Wing area: 103 m^{2} (1,110 sq ft)
- Empty weight: 11,045 kg (24,350 lb)
- Max takeoff weight: 17,250 kg (38,030 lb)
- Powerplant: 2 × ASh-82FNV fourteen-cylinder two-row air cooled radial engine, 1,380 kW (1,850 hp) each

Performance

- Maximum speed: 407 km/h (253 mph, 220 kn) at 2,500 m (8,200 ft)
- Range: 1,500 km (930 mi, 810 nmi)
- Endurance: 4.5 hr
- Service ceiling: 6,500 m (21,300 ft)
- Time to altitude: 15 minutes to 5,000 m (16,400 ft)
