= Flight 451 =

Flight 451 may refer to:

- Linee Aeree Italiane Flight 451 (1954), crashed on 18 December 1954
- Linee Aeree Italiane Flight 451 (1956), crashed on 24 November 1956
- Japan Air System Flight 451, crashed on 18 April 1993
- Helikopter Service Flight 451, crashed on 8 September 1997
