= Linee Aeree Italiane Flight 451 =

Linee Aeree Italiane Flight 451 may refer to

- Linee Aeree Italiane Flight 451 (1954), crashed in New York
- Linee Aeree Italiane Flight 451 (1956), crashed in Paris
