= Minsk 1 =

Minsk 1 may refer to:

- the first of the Minsk agreements
- the former Minsk-1 Airport
