= GDG =

GDG may refer to:

- Go, Diego, Go!, an American animated children's television program
- gdg, the ISO 639-3 code for Ga'dang language
- Magdagachi Airport, the IATA code GDG
- Gadag Junction railway station, the station code GDG
- Gedangan railway station (Sidoarjo), the station code GDG
- Generation Data Group, z/OS archival automation
- Google Developer Groups or GDGs
