= Minsk Airport =

Minsk Airport may refer to:

- Minsk-1 Airport, a former airport located within the city limits of Minsk
- Minsk National Airport (formerly known as Minsk-2), east of the city of Minsk
