= Flight 10 =

Flight 10 may refer to:

- Civil Air Transport Flight 10, crashed in Linkou Township, Taipei County on February 16, 1968
- Aeroflot Flight 10 (1954), struck trees and crashed near Severny Airport on September 27, 1954
- Starship flight test 10, a successful test flight of SpaceX Starship in August 2025
