= Aeroflot Flight 414 =

1960 aviation accident in the Soviet Union

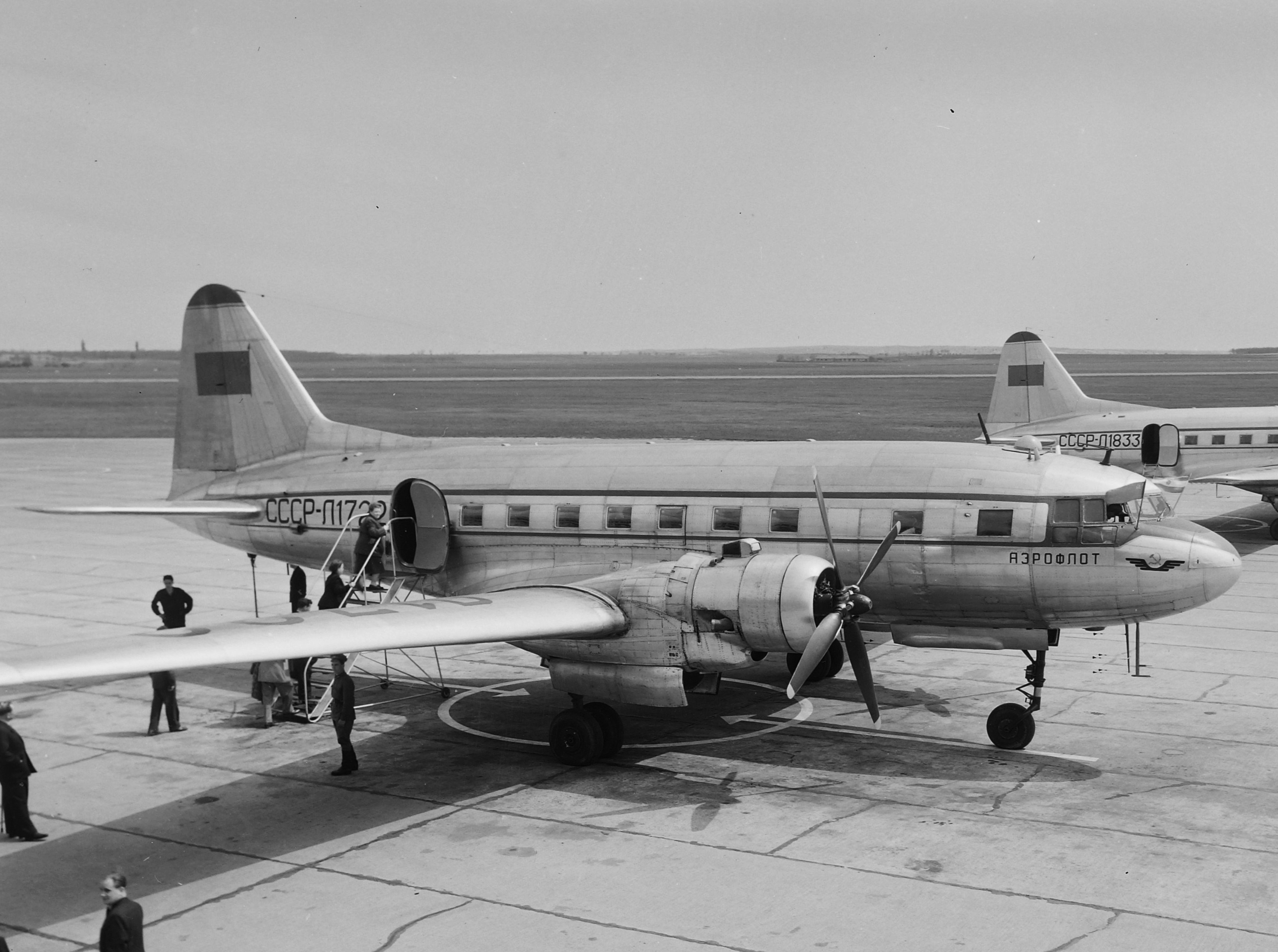
- An Aeroflot Il-12 similar to the one involved

Accident
- Date: 21 July 1960
- Summary: Crashed after takeoff due to pilot error aggravated by overweight and wet runway
- Site: Minsk-1 Airport, Minsk, Byelorussian SSR
- Total fatalities: 8

Aircraft
- Aircraft type: Ilyushin Il-12
- Operator: Aeroflot
- Registration: CCCP-01405
- Flight origin: Rzhevka Airport, Leningrad, Russian SFSR
- 1st stopover: Vilnius Airport, Vilnius, Lithuanian SSR
- 2nd stopover: Minsk-1 Airport, Minsk, Byelorussian SSR
- Destination: Lviv Danylo Halytskyi International Airport, Lviv, Ukrainian SSR
- Occupants: 28
- Passengers: 24
- Crew: 4
- Fatalities: 7
- Survivors: 21

Ground casualties
- Ground fatalities: 1

Aeroflot Flight 414 was a domestic flight en routing Leningrad - Vilnius - Minsk - Lviv. On 21 July 1960, in its final leg, the Ilyushin Il-12 stalled and struck the ground just shortly after takeoff from Minsk-1 Airport, killing seven of the 28 on board and one on the ground.

== Background ==
=== Aircraft ===
The aircraft involved was an Ilyushin Il-12 manufactured in 1949 and was initially delivered to the Moscow unit as CCCP-Л1725. Then, it was transferred to the East Siberia unit, and finally to the Ukrainian unit on September 20, 1958. By the time of the accident, it had accumulated 13,706 flight hours.

=== Crew members ===
- Captain: Krivetsky Ivan Andreevich
- Co-pilot: Moiseev Valentin Pavlovich
- Flight mechanic: Borisov Alexander Ivanovich
- Radio operator: Boris Ivanovich Puzikov

== Accident ==
Due to thunderstorms at Minsk, the flight was delayed and only landed at 23:28 on July 20. On the next day, at 00:30, the plane started taxiing toward the runway. At 00:32, the plane began to take off. Just as the plane lifted off, the nose pitched up at a low speed, making the plane bounce three times. The plane then climbed 750 meters for the beginning of the runway, but then stalled and banked to the left. It struck lighting wires, knocked a floodlight off the roof of a building, sheared off a utility pole, severed high-voltage cables, amd slammed into trucks. Its right wing was torn off, after which it crashed through a fence and into a gaping, three-meter-deep pit behind it. The forward fuselage was completely destroyed, and the tail section was torn off. As a result, the crash killed all four crew members, three passengers and a driver.

Eighteen of the survivors were transported to hospitals in Minsk suffering from fractures, contusions, and concussions, while the other three required no significant medical attention at all.

== Investigation ==
The investigation concluded that the pilots had rotated the aircraft with insufficient speed as the plane was on the verge of overrunning the runway due to water built up during the thunderstorm, which was not addressed by the inspector. A contributory factor was that the plane was overweight by carrying 23 passengers and 1 child in a 21-seat aircraft.
