= Aeroflot Flight 10 =

Aeroflot Flight 10 may refer to:

- Aeroflot Flight 10 (1954), struck trees and crashed near Severny Airport on September 27, 1954
- Aeroflot Flight 10 (1957), crashed due to rudder failure on December 18, 1957
