= UNCC =

UNCC may refer to:

- The University of North Carolina at Charlotte, a university in Charlotte, North Carolina, United States
- A now-obsolete reference to the Charlotte 49ers, the above school's athletic program
- The United Nations Compensation Commission, a subsidiary organ of the UN Security Council, set up in the aftermath of the 1990 Iraqi invasion of Kuwait
- The United Nations Conciliation Commission, established by the UN General Assembly to help resolve the 1948 Arab-Israeli War.
- The Uganda National Cultural Centre in Kampala
- The United Nations Conference Centre (Addis Ababa) in Addis Ababa, Ethiopia, administered by UNECA
- The United Nations Conference Centre (Bangkok) in Bangkok, Thailand, headquarters of ESCAP
- Novosibirsk Severny Airport in Novosibirsk, Russia (ICAO code UNCC)
