= 1948 Aeroflot Ilyushin Il-12 crash =

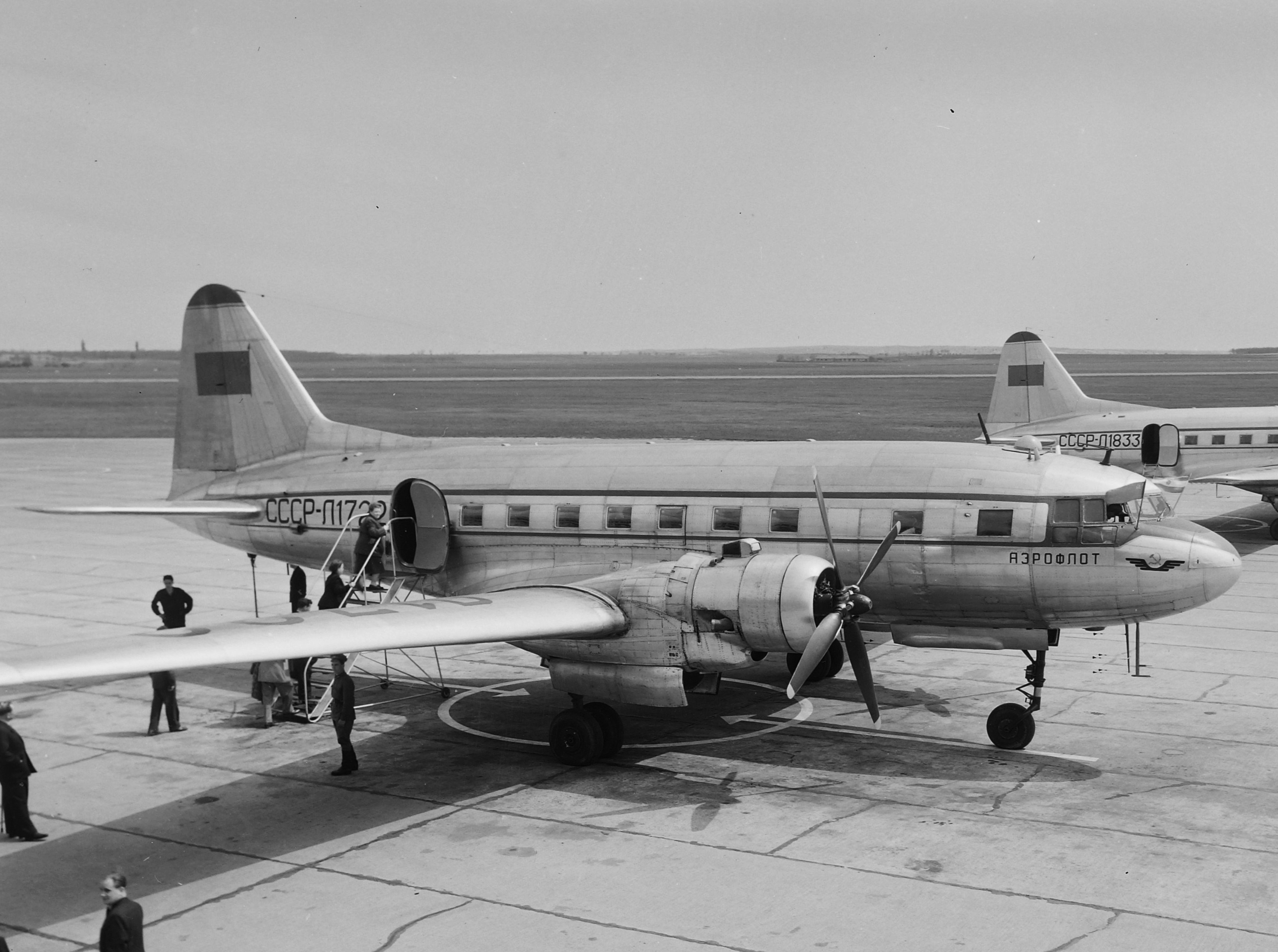
- An Aeroflot Ilyushin Il-12

Accident
- Date: 12 October 1948
- Summary: Unexplained disappearance (probably CFIT)
- Site: Main Caucasian Range near Yevlakh, Azerbaijan SSR

Aircraft
- Aircraft type: Ilyushin Il-12
- Operator: Aeroflot
- Registration: CCCP-Л1450
- Flight origin: Tashkent Airport, Uzbek SSR
- 1st stopover: Baku Airport, Azerbaijan SSR
- 2nd stopover: Tbilisi Airport, Georgia SSR
- Destination: Adler Airport
- Passengers: 6
- Crew: 4
- Fatalities: 10
- Survivors: 0

On 12 October 1948, an Aeroflot Ilyushin Il-12 crashed during a scheduled flight from Baku Airport to Tbilisi Airport. The plane or its debris was never found. All 10 people aboard the aircraft are presumed to have died.

== Aircraft ==
The aircraft involved was a twin-engine Ilyushin Il-12 (serial number: 25-17, c/n 8302517). The aircraft's first flight was in 1948 and was given to the Uzbekistan division of Aeroflot with registration CCCP-Л1450. It had 274 flight hours when the accident happened.

== Flight and accident ==
On 11 October, the aircraft took off from Tashkent on a flight to Baku and landed at Baku at 11:15 local time. Due to bad weather, the aircraft stayed overnight at Baku. The next day, the crew decided to fly to Adler via Yevlakh and Tbilisi, without ATC permission. Baku Airport was closed to incoming flights due to strong winds, but the head of the airport allowed the aircraft to take off despite the conditions and without briefing the crew. During the flight, the crew radioed three times that they could not establish a connection with the direction finder at Tbilisi Airport nor tune to the airport radio. ATC reported that the radio was working, but the direction finder could not detect the aircraft. The radio was turned on, but an incorrect call sign was given. At 12:13 the crew radioed that the airport radio was not working and that they were returning to Baku, but Baku ATC did not realize this. The crew then radioed their position, over the Yevlakh region and demanded the Yevlakh radio be turned on. This was the last message from the aircraft. Due to a malfunction of the automatic transmitter, messages were sent every 3-6 minutes instead of the normal 30 seconds. No further communications were heard from the aircraft and it never arrived at its destination. A search was launched for the missing aircraft, but it was never found.

== Investigation ==
The aircraft was flying at 3,000 m (9,800 ft) in clouds, and this may have caused wing icing. The pilot, flying blind, probably attempted to straighten the route and fly to Tbilisi directly, but this would take the aircraft over the southern slopes of the Main Caucasian Ridge and 70–80 km (43–50 mi) from Yevlakh. The wind was also blowing the aircraft towards the mountains. Due to the radio problems, the crew probably became disorientated and later descended below the clouds thinking they were near Baku, when it fact they were further north over mountains, where the aircraft probably struck a mountain hidden in cloud.

Radio equipment failure was also blamed.
