= Novosibirsk Air Enterprise =

Airline from Russia

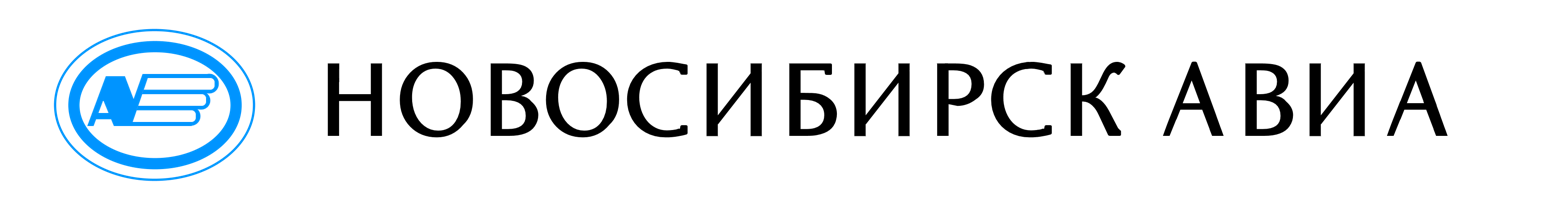
IATA	ICAO	Call sign
-	NBE	NAKAIR
- Founded: 1995
- Ceased operations: 2011
- Hubs: Severny Airport
- Fleet size: 9 (in 2009)
- Headquarters: Novosibirsk, Russia
- Key people: Igor Borodij (Director General)

Novosibirsk Air Enterprise was an airline based in Novosibirsk, Russia. It operated passenger and cargo services and aerial surveying work. It was established and started operations in 1929 as Novosibirsk Air Squad. Its main base was Severny Airport. In 1995 it was reorganized to the state-owned Novosibirsk Air Enterprise and after going through bankruptcy in 2004, it was privatized in 2005. In November 2010, the company went bankrupt again, and in 2011, 8 of its 9 planes, as well as other property, were sold. The company's certificate was cancelled in July 2011.

== Fleet ==
The Novosibirsk Air Enterprise fleet in March 2009 included:

- 1 × Antonov An-24B
- 5 × Antonov An-24RV
- 3 × Antonov An-30

In August 2006 the airline also operated:

- 3 × Antonov An-24
- 1 × Let L-410 UVP
