= ČSA Flight 548 =

1956 aviation accident

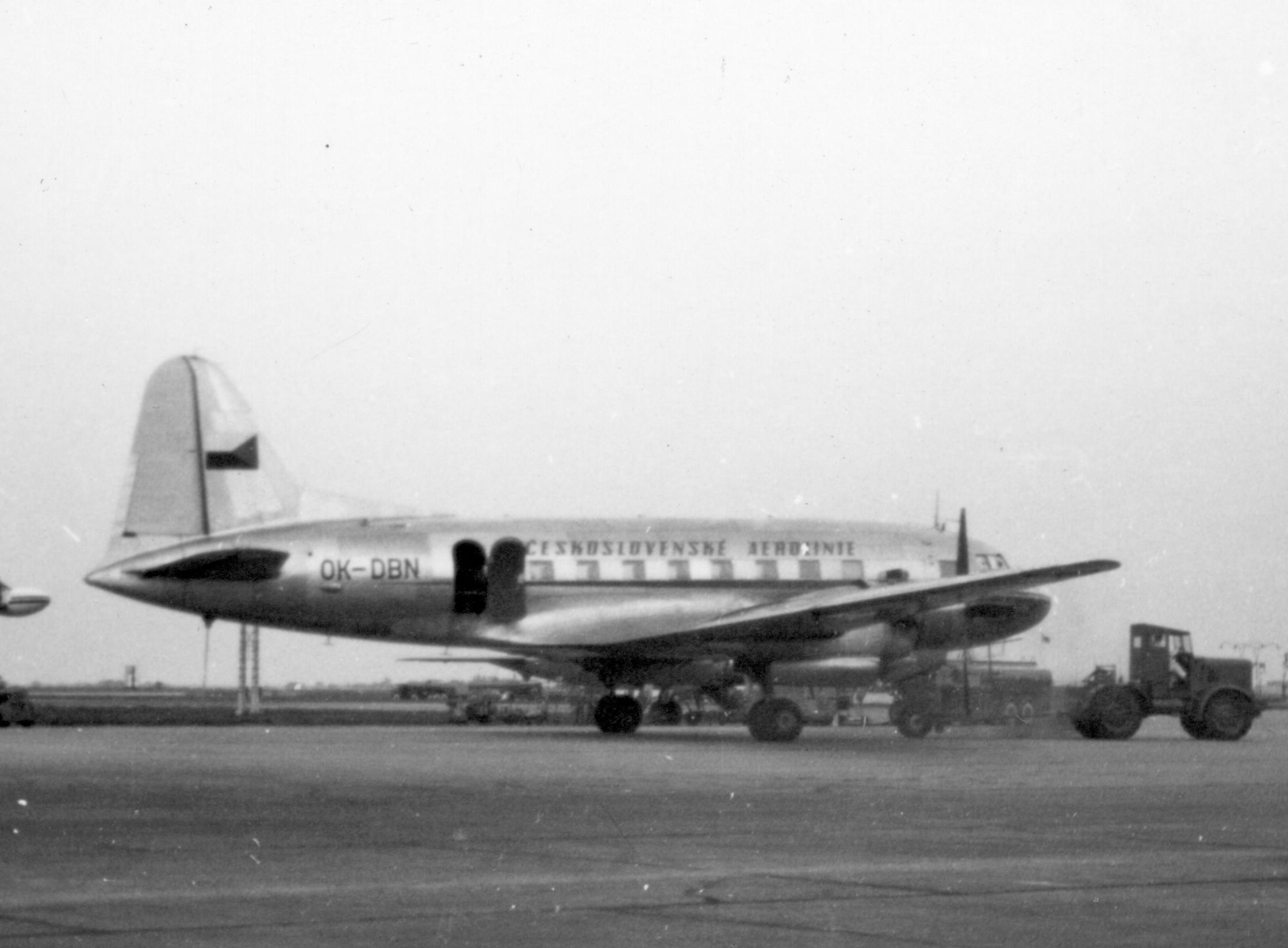
- A Ilyushin Il-12 of (ČSA) Československé Státní Aerolinie similar to the incident aircraft

Accident
- Date: 24 November 1956
- Summary: Engine failure shortly after take-off
- Site: Eglisau, Switzerland

Aircraft
- Aircraft type: Ilyushin Il-12B
- Operator: (ČSA) Československé Státní Aerolinie
- Registration: OK-DBP
- Flight origin: Zurich, Switzerland
- Destination: Prague, Czechoslovakia
- Occupants: 23
- Passengers: 18
- Crew: 5
- Fatalities: 23
- Survivors: 0

On 24 November 1956 the (ČSA) Československé Státní Aerolinie Ilyushin Il-12B "OK-DBP" was an international scheduled passenger flight from Zurich to Prague. Shortly after take off from Zurich Airport the airplane crashed 12 kilometres (7.5 mi) north of the airport in a field near Eglisau and Wasterkingen, Switzerland. All 23 people on board were killed.

On the same day another international scheduled passenger flight crashed, the 1956 Paris DC-6 crash.

The crash is listed as one of the main flight accidents in Switzerland.

== Flight and crash ==
The affected airplane of the crash was an Ilyushin Il-12 with tail number "OK-DBP". It was operated by ČSA Czechoslovak Airlines. The airplane was seven years old with its first flight in 1949. Earlier in the day on 24 November 1956, the airplane had already done a return flight from Prague to Zurich. During this return flight it was reported that the airplane had already had engine problems.

In the evening on 24 November 1956 the airplane departed again from Zurich Airport for an international passenger flight from Zurich to Prague. Shortly after take-off the airplane experienced an engine failure. While attempting to return to the airport, the airplane went out of control and crashed nose first at 18:20 local time 12 kilometres (7.5 mi) north of the airport in a field near Wasterkingen, Switzerland close to the German border. The aircraft exploded upon impact, killing all 23 people on board and forming a crater 10 metres wide and 3 meters deep.

Soon after the crash, Czechoslovak aviation experts started an investigation.

== Victims ==
Nationality of the victims
Nationality	Crew	Passengers
China	—	10
Czechoslovakia	—	6
Bolivia	—	2
Total	5	18

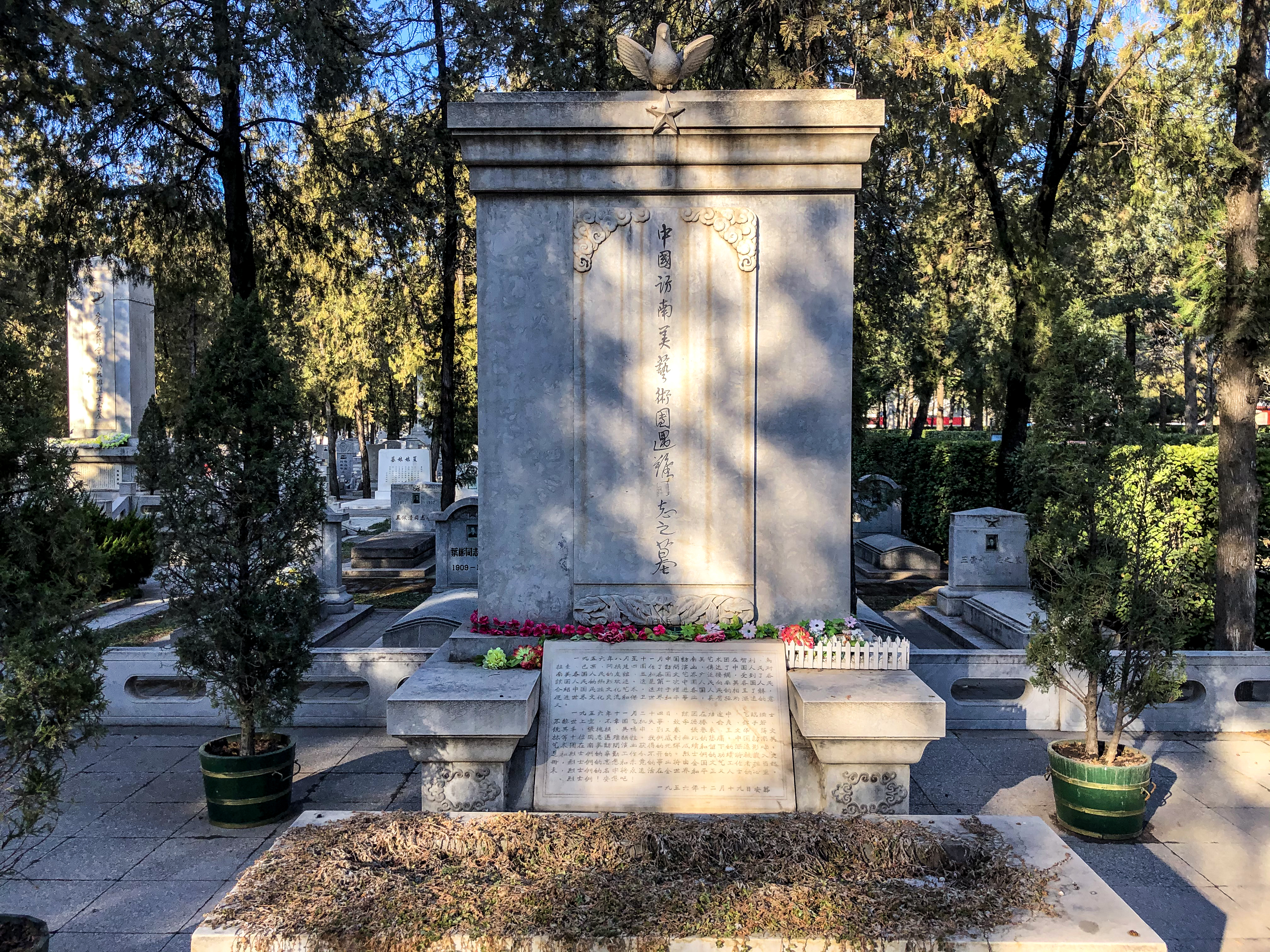
Monument to the Chinese victims at Babaoshan Revolutionary Cemetery, Beijing

There were 23 people on board the airplane: 18 passengers and 5 crew members. All 23 people were killed in the crash. The passengers consisted of 10 Chinese people, six Czech people and two Bolivian people. The pilot of the flight was Josef Plechatý.

Among the passengers were five people from the Czechoslovak ice hockey team TJ Baník Chomutov ZJF (now called Piráti Chomutov) and a reporter, playing in the highest national league, the Czechoslovak Extraliga. The team was on return after playing international matches in Switzerland. The team booked in a flight earlier, but the team was asked to give up some seats of their return flight. The six who changed to this flight were the club's founders, Stanislav Vaisochr, the chairman of the physical education unit Jan Výborný, goalkeeper Miroslav Pašek and forwards Zdeněk Nový and Ondřej Borovička and a reporter. Two of the three players were also players of the Czechoslovakia men's national ice hockey team: the 34 year old Pašek and the 25 year old Nový.

The ten Chinese people were members of the China National Opera from Beijing. They were on return to China after an opera tour in Latin America and Western Europe.

== See also ==
- List of accidents involving sports teams
