= Karmanovo =

Karmanovo (Russian: Карманово) is the name of several rural localities in Russia:

- Karmanovo, Tatyshlinsky District, Republic of Bashkortostan, a village in Bul-Kaypanovsky Selsoviet of Tatyshlinsky District of the Republic of Bashkortostan
- Karmanovo, Yanaulsky District, Republic of Bashkortostan, a selo in Karmanovsky Selsoviet of Yanaulsky District of the Republic of Bashkortostan
- Karmanovo, Kaluga Oblast, a village in Yukhnovsky District of Kaluga Oblast
- Karmanovo, Kostroma Oblast, a village in Loparevskoye Settlement of Galichsky District of Kostroma Oblast
- Karmanovo, Kursk Oblast, a selo in Karmanovsky Selsoviet of Zheleznogorsky District of Kursk Oblast
- Karmanovo, Taldomsky District, Moscow Oblast, a village in Tempovoye Rural Settlement of Taldomsky District of Moscow Oblast
- Karmanovo, Zaraysky District, Moscow Oblast, a village in Karinskoye Rural Settlement of Zaraysky District of Moscow Oblast
- Karmanovo, Borovichsky District, Novgorod Oblast, a village in Peredskoye Settlement of Borovichsky District of Novgorod Oblast
- Karmanovo, Moshenskoy District, Novgorod Oblast, a village in Kirovskoye Settlement of Moshenskoy District of Novgorod Oblast
- Karmanovo, Omsk Oblast, a village in Khokhlovsky Rural Okrug of Sargatsky District of Omsk Oblast
- Karmanovo, Smolensk Oblast, a selo in Karmanovskoye Rural Settlement of Gagarinsky District of Smolensk Oblast
- Karmanovo, Republic of Tatarstan, a selo in Zainsky District of the Republic of Tatarstan
- Karmanovo, Firovsky District, Tver Oblast, a village in Velikooktyabrskoye Rural Settlement of Firovsky District of Tver Oblast
- Karmanovo, Kuvshinovsky District, Tver Oblast, a village in Borzynskoye Rural Settlement of Kuvshinovsky District of Tver Oblast
- Karmanovo, Udomelsky District, Tver Oblast, a village in Ryadskoye Rural Settlement of Udomelsky District of Tver Oblast
