= Karmanovo, Tatyshlinsky District, Republic of Bashkortostan =

Karmanovo Карманово
- Village
- Location within Bashkortostan Location within Russia
- Coordinates: 56°24′N 55°42′E
- Country: Russia
- Region: Bashkortostan
- District: Tatyshlinsky District
- Time zone: UTC+5:00

Karmanovo (Russian: Карманово; Bashkir: Ҡарман, Qarman) is a rural locality (a village) in Bul-Kaypanovsky Selsoviet, Tatyshlinsky District, Bashkortostan, Russia. The population was 37 as of 2010. There is 1 street.

== Geography ==
Karmanovo is located 20 km northwest of Verkhniye Tatyshly (the district's administrative centre) by road. Starokaypanovo is the nearest rural locality.
