= Linee Aeree Italiane Flight 451 (1956) =

1956 aviation accident

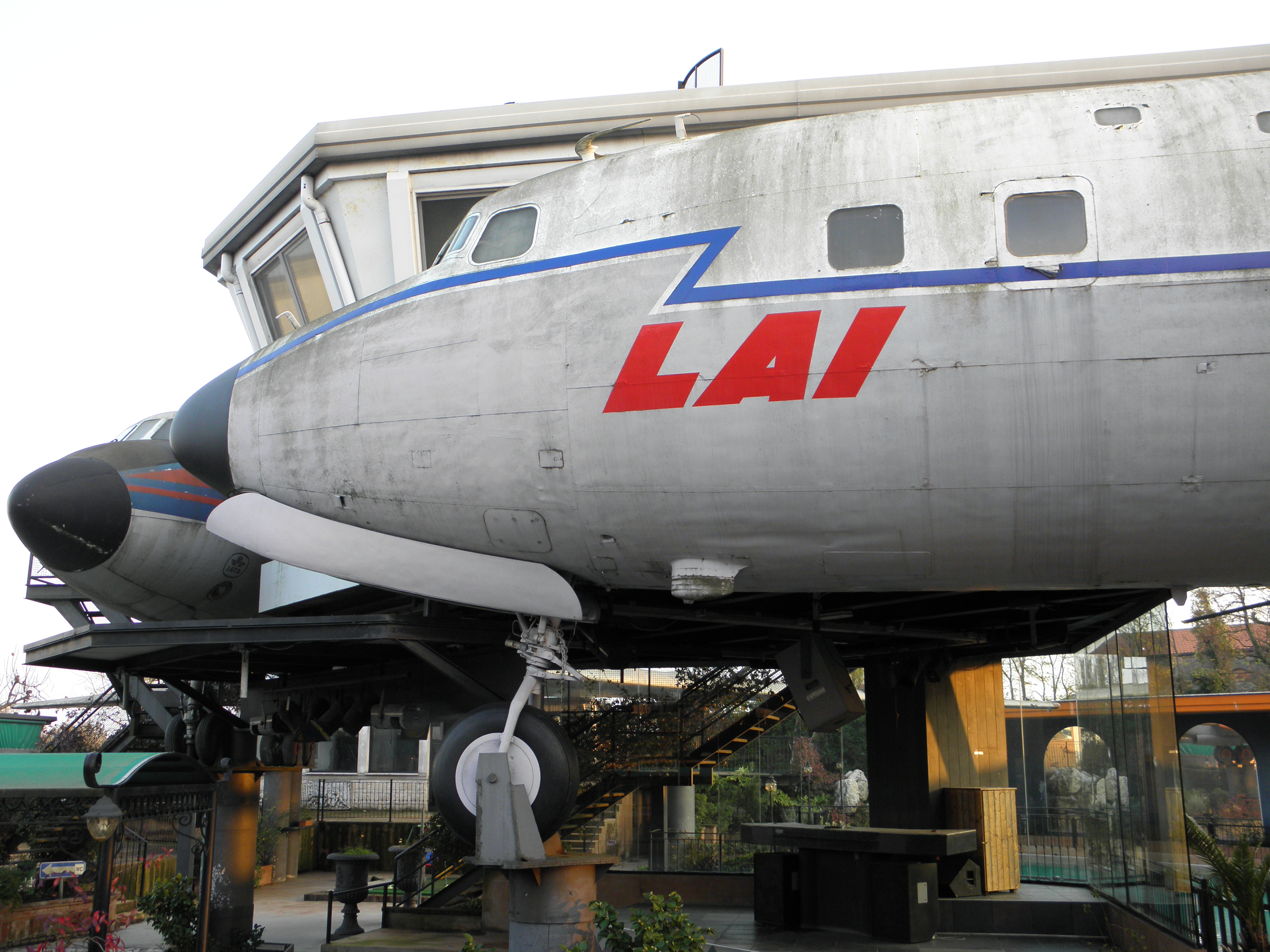
- A DC-6B of Linee Aeree Italiane similar to the incident aircraft (on display).

Accident
- Date: 24 November 1956
- Summary: Loss of control for undetermined reasons
- Site: Paray-Vieille-Poste, France

Aircraft
- Aircraft type: Douglas DC-6B
- Operator: Linee Aeree Italiane
- Registration: I-LEAD
- Flight origin: Rome, Italy
- Stopover: ~~Milan, Italy~~ (skipped)
- 2nd stopover: Paris Orly Airport, France
- 3rd stopover: Shannon Airport, Ireland
- Destination: New York, United States
- Passengers: 25
- Crew: 10
- Fatalities: 34
- Injuries: 1
- Survivors: 1

On 24 November 1956 the Linee Aeree Italiane Douglas DC-6B "I-LEAD" was an international scheduled passenger flight from Rome via Paris and Shannon to New York. Shortly after take off from Paris Orly Airport the airplane lost altitude and crashed into houses in the commune Paray-Vieille-Poste. 34 of the 35 people on board were killed, including Italian orchestral conductor Guido Cantelli.

On the same day another notable international scheduled passenger flight crashed, the 1956 Eglisau Ilyushin Il-12 plane crash.

The crash happened two years after 1954 Linee Aeree Italiane Flight 451; the same flight from Rome to New York with the same flight number and similar Douglas DC-6B that crashed killing 26 people.

== Flight and crash ==
On 24 November 1956 the Linee Aeree Italiane Douglas DC-6B with tail number “I-LEAD” an international scheduled passenger flight from Rome via Milan, Paris and Shannon to New York. The aircraft was new, in service since 5 November 1956, making its fourth flight.

The plane skipped the stopover at Milan due to fog and arrived an hour too early at Paris Orly Airport. The plane departed from Orly at 00:35am. The weather was cold and misty with visibility of 2.2 kilometres. Shortly after take off the airplane was not able to elevate further. The pilot said that he was not able to reach height and would return to the airport. The airplane hit the roof of a house in commune Paray-Vieille-Poste.

According to eye witnesses there was an explosion and the airplane broke apart. The airplane crashed into a worker's house a few 100 metres further away. The airplane had also hit an electricity cable and there was an explosion. There was a large fire, partly due to the 23000 liters of fuel the airplane had on board. The two houses were destroyed. Wreckage lay up to 500 meters from the crash site. The four engines were flung in four different directions.

== Rescue operation ==
The local fire department and the fire department of the United States Air Force went to the fires. Shortly after the crash there were 200 policemen and firefighters at the crash area. It took until after 9am to free bodies from the wreckage. Most of the bodies were transported to the marriage chamber of the city hall of Paray-Vieille-Poste.

== Victims ==
Initial reports stated that on the plane were 36 people: 26 passengers and ten crew members. Twenty-four passengers boarded in Rome and an additional two boarded in Paris. Later reports and the final refer stated there were not 26 but 25 passengers. The passengers consisted of one Turkish passenger, twelve American passengers and the others being Italian passengers. Nine of the ten crew members were Italian citizens; the stewardess was a French citizen. Captain Attilio Vazzoler was 41 years old and was one of the more experienced pilots of the company with more than ten thousand hours of flight.

Thirty-four of the 35 people on board were killed in the accident: the ten crew members and 24 passengers, including a baby. One of the passengers killed was Italian orchestra conductor Guido Cantelli, who was the musical director of Teatro alla Scala in Milan. He was on his way to New York to meet Italian conductor Arturo Toscanini. Cantelli was 36 years old. In the three houses that burned down there was only one person with minor injuries. Two firemen were injured after a wall collapsed in one of the burning houses.

There were initially two survivors reported, passengers Niccodemo and Concetta Finamore, an Italian married couple, both rescued with severe burn injuries. Niccodemo later succumbed to his wounds, leaving Concetta as the sole survivor.

== Investigation ==
After investigation, according to the final report, the initial and direct cause of the crash are unclear. The loss of altitude after take off is mentioned to be the main cause of the crash. It’s unknown why the aircraft lost altitude however. The regulations in force were observed, however unmarked obstructions in the take off path constituted an aggravating factor. No malfunctioning of the aircraft was found. The crew was qualified and had had sufficient rest. There was a film of frost on the upper surface of the extremity of each wing, as reported by an Orly employee. It is stated that it is improbable this affected the flight.
