= LAI-Linee Aeree Italiane =

Linee Aeree Italiane SpA
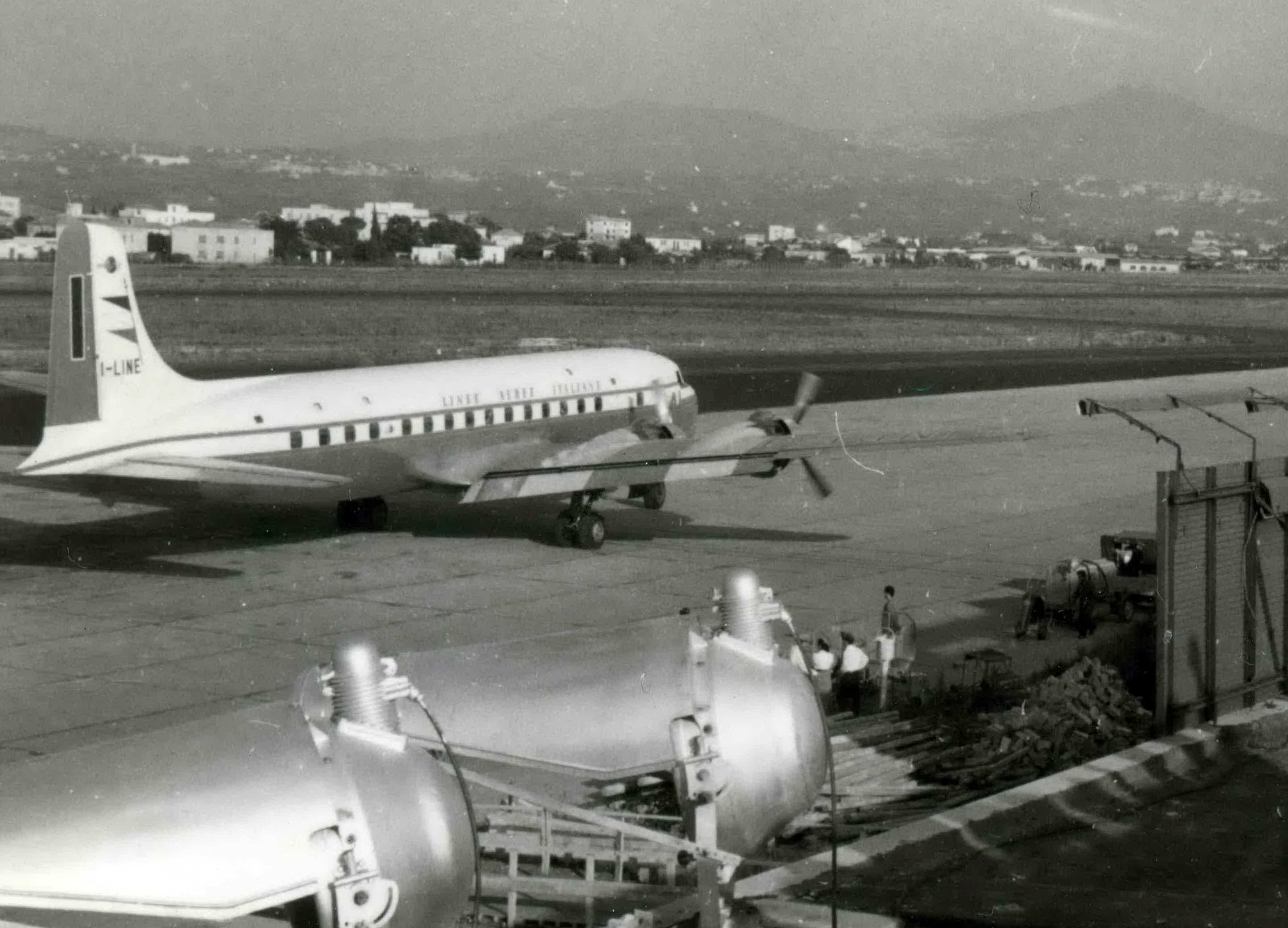
- Douglas DC-6
IATA	ICAO	Call sign
LI	—	—
- Founded: 1946
- Commenced operations: 14 April 1947
- Ceased operations: 11 November 1957 when merged to form Alitalia-Linee Aeree Italiane
- Hubs: Rome
- Secondary hubs: Milan
- Alliance: TWA
- Parent company: IRI (60%), TWA (40%)
- Headquarters: Rome
- Key people: prince Marcantonio Pacelli President - Luigi Gallo General Manager

Linee Aeree Italiane S.p.A. (abbreviated to LAI) was an Italian airline founded in 1946 to restart scheduled flights in Italy after the end of World War II. After a period of technical innovation and success, political pressure forced the company to merge with a partner/rival and create Alitalia-Linee Aeree Italiane.

== History ==
=== The beginnings ===
Thanks to the lifting of the Allied veto on the reconstitution of Italian civil aviation, LAI was founded on September 16, 1946, on the initiative of the US airline Transcontinental Western Air (TWA) (40%) and IRI (Institute for Industrial Reconstruction) (60%). The agreement with TWA actually dated back to February 11. Prince Marcantonio Pacelli, nephew of Pope Pius XII, was appointed president. Air Force former general Luigi Gallo, an experienced pilot, was appointed general manager. Technical supervision was entrusted to TWA, represented on the board of directors by Warren Lee Pierson. In 1947, a capital increase saw FIAT (7%), Società Italiana per le Strade Ferrate Meridionali (7%), and Piaggio (6%) join the shareholder pool.

Flight operations began on April 14, 1947, from Rome-Urbe airport to Cagliari, Milan, Catania-Palermo, with seven Douglas DC3s salvaged from decommissioned war material and converted for civilian use. That same year, LAI also began its first international flights to Athens–Istanbul and Tunis. In 1948, Barcelona was added.

LAI was a key player in the expansion of Italian commercial aviation in the 1950s: it was the country's leading air transport company, surpassing even Alitalia, then a separate company (controlled by IRI and British European Airways), with which it was actually in competition. The first Douglas DC-6s, purchased with funds from the European Reconstruction Program (ERP), arrived at the right time, as 1950 coincided with the catholic Holy Year. It was also the first Italian airline to operate from 1950 direct transatlantic flights to the United States (New York), using Douglas DC-6s. Coinciding with this event, the hub, the operational base, was moved to Rome Ciampino Airport.

=== The growth ===
In 1952, LAI absorbed ALI-Flotte Riunite, further expanding its domestic and European network. Beginning in 1953, the Convair CV-240, bought second-hand, was also introduced into the fleet. The twin-engine aircraft had been previously used intensively and had troubled the electrical and hydraulic systems.

Overall, it can be said that these results were achieved thanks in part to the support of shareholder TWA, which provided high-performance aircraft by the standards of the time, as well as significant financial resources, vision, and managerial direction, including route planning. The operating years between 1948 and 1953, in fact, all closed with a profit. In the last year, LAI operated 25 domestic, 22 international, and 12 intercontinental routes, flying 7.6 million kilometers and carrying 151,000 passengers. In the mid-1950s, former military pilot and now industrialist Franco Palma acquired a 10% stake in the company and was appointed CEO and vice president. His relationship with General Gallo was not cordial, and a sense of uncertainty began to spread within the airline. Palma was behind the Lockheed L-1649 order (January 1956), also sponsored by TWA, which even promised to make available four of the Boeings ordered to the Italian partner. The order for the L-1649 was cancelled, and the four ships went straight to TWA. The Vickers Viscount had better luck, with six series 700 examples ordered in May 1956 and introduced on the main European routes from the following summer.

=== End of the airline ===
After the November 1956 accident, Marcantonio Pacelli resigned as president and was replaced by an Air Force general. On January 15, Luigi Gallo was rudely dismissed, and Franco Palma became general manager. Flight operations were entrusted to Aldo Tait, a highly professional pilot. Over the following weeks, government officials advised Palma to step aside, while TWA made it clear it would gladly sell all its shares (30%). In the middle of summer, the company's merger with Alitalia was officially announced. LAI went into voluntary liquidation on October 31, and on the same date, its personnel, fleet, and concessions were transferred to Alitalia. IRI held a 71.5% stake in this company. LAI ceased operations on November 1, 1957, when its merger with Alitalia (also controlled by IRI) became effective, creating Alitalia - Linee Aeree Italiane.

== Fleet ==
LAI fleet consisted of the following aircraft types:

- 18 × Douglas DC-3 in service 1947–1957 (+ 8 more inherited from ALI-Flotte Riunite)
- 4 × General Dynamics Convair CV-240 in service 1953–1956
- 4 × Douglas DC-6 in service 1950–1957
- 4 × Douglas DC-6B in service 1954–1957
- 6 × Vickers Viscount 700 in service 1957

4 Lockheed L-1649s were ordered but later cancelled.

== Incidents and accidents ==
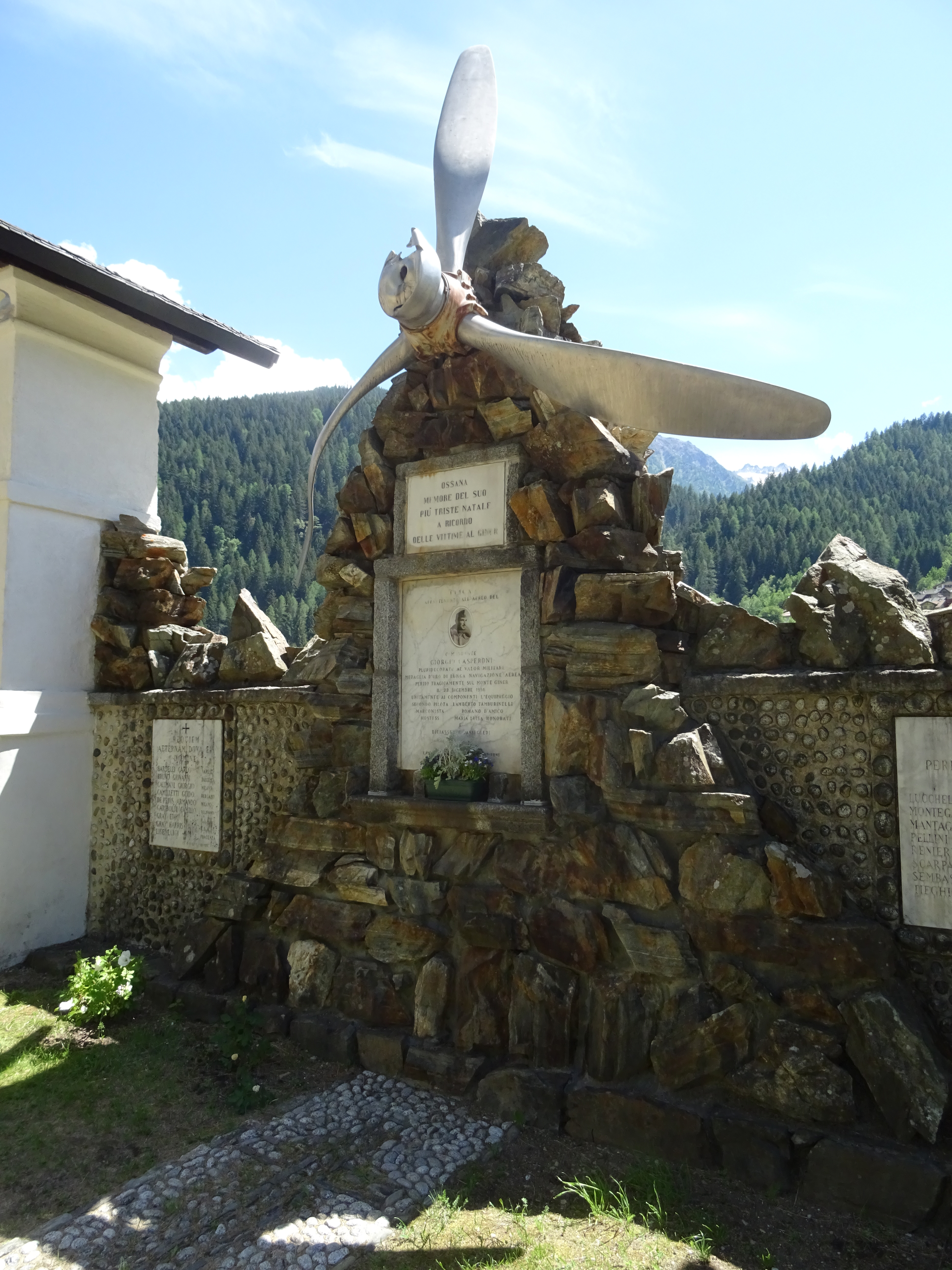
Monument to the victims of the Mount Giner air crash

- November 28, 1951: Douglas DC-3, registered I-LETR, crashed after takeoff from Milan's Malpensa airport; fortunately, no casualties.
- December 23, 1951: Douglas DC-6, registered I-LUCK, crashed on landing at Milan's Malpensa airport; fortunately, no casualties.
- January 26, 1953: Douglas DC-3, registered I-LAIL, crashed near the town of Sinnai (Sardinia) due to a wing failure, killing all 19 people on board.
- April 10, 1954: Douglas DC-3, registered I-LENT, crashed after takeoff from Ciampino airport (Rome); no casualties.
- December 18, 1954: Linee Aeree Italiane Flight 451 — Douglas DC-6, registered I-LINE, crashed on approach to New York/Idlewild (JFK) airport after a 2.5-hour holding pattern, with 6 survivors and 26 deaths.
- November 23, 1956: Linee Aeree Italiane Flight 451 — Douglas DC-6B, registered I-LEAD, departing from Paris-Orly airport, crashed seconds after takeoff, killing 34 of the 35 people on board.
- December 22, 1956: Douglas DC-3, registered I-LINC, crashed on Mount Giner, near Ossana, killing 21 people. The flight changed course in bad weather conditions.
- January 2, 1957: Douglas DC-3, registered I-LEDA, destroyed on landing at Reggio Calabria airport; no casualties.
