= KLM Flight 633 =

1954 aviation accident

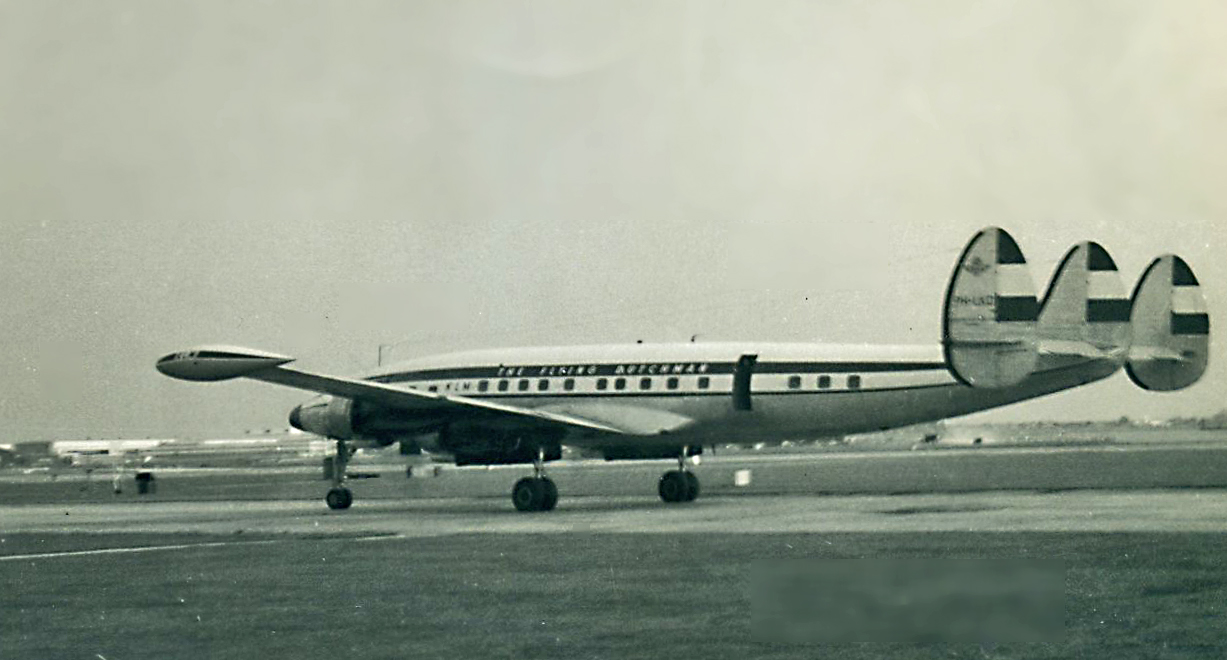
- A KLM L-1049 similar to the one involved in the crash.

Accident
- Date: September 5, 1954
- Summary: Mechanical failure
- Site: Shannon, Ireland

Aircraft
- Aircraft type: Lockheed L-1049C-55-81 Super Constellation
- Aircraft name: Triton
- Operator: KLM
- Registration: PH-LKY
- Flight origin: Schiphol Airport, Amsterdam
- Stopover: Shannon, Ireland
- Destination: Idlewild Airport, New York City
- Passengers: 46
- Crew: 10
- Fatalities: 28
- Injuries: 20
- Survivors: 28

KLM Flight 633 was a passenger flight from Amsterdam to New York City. On 5 September 1954, immediately after takeoff from Shannon Airport, the Super Constellation Triton ditched on a mudbank in the River Shannon. 28 people were killed in the accident. It was caused by an unexpected re-extension of the landing gear, possibly compounded by pilot error.

== Triton disaster ==
The Lockheed Super Constellation Triton (registration PH-LKY) was piloted by Adriaan Viruly, one of the airline's most senior pilots. After a refuelling stop at Shannon, the plane took off for the transatlantic leg of the flight at about 02:40. There were 46 passengers and ten crew on board. Shortly after takeoff, the pilot reduced power from maximum to METO (Maximum Except Take Off). The pilot was unaware that the landing gear was not retracted, and as result the aircraft descended to touch down in the Shannon estuary. It turned around on impact and broke into two sections.

The aircraft was partially submerged, and at least one of the fuel tanks had ruptured during the crash. The fuel fumes rendered many passengers and crew unconscious, who then drowned in the rising tide. In the end, three crew-members and 25 passengers perished.

Even though the crash occurred less than one minute after the plane took off from Shannon Airport, airport authorities remained unaware of the disaster until the mud-caked third pilot (navigator) of the craft, Johan Tieman, stumbled into the airport and reported, "We've crashed!" That was 2 1/2 hours after the plane fell. Mr. Tieman had swum ashore and floundered painfully across the marshes to the airport, whose lights were clearly visible from the scene of the crash. It was not until 7 o'clock in the morning - 4 1/2 hours after the crash - that the first launch reached the survivors, who were huddled on a muddy flat in the river.

== Cause of the accident ==
The official investigation concluded that the accident was caused by an unexpected re-extension of the landing gear and the captain's incorrect behaviour in this situation. Viruly, who had been only one year from retirement, rejected the responsibility for the crash and was bitter about his subsequent treatment by KLM. In an interview he later stated that there simply had not been enough time to react.
