= Aeroflot Flight 10 (1954) =

1954 aviation accident

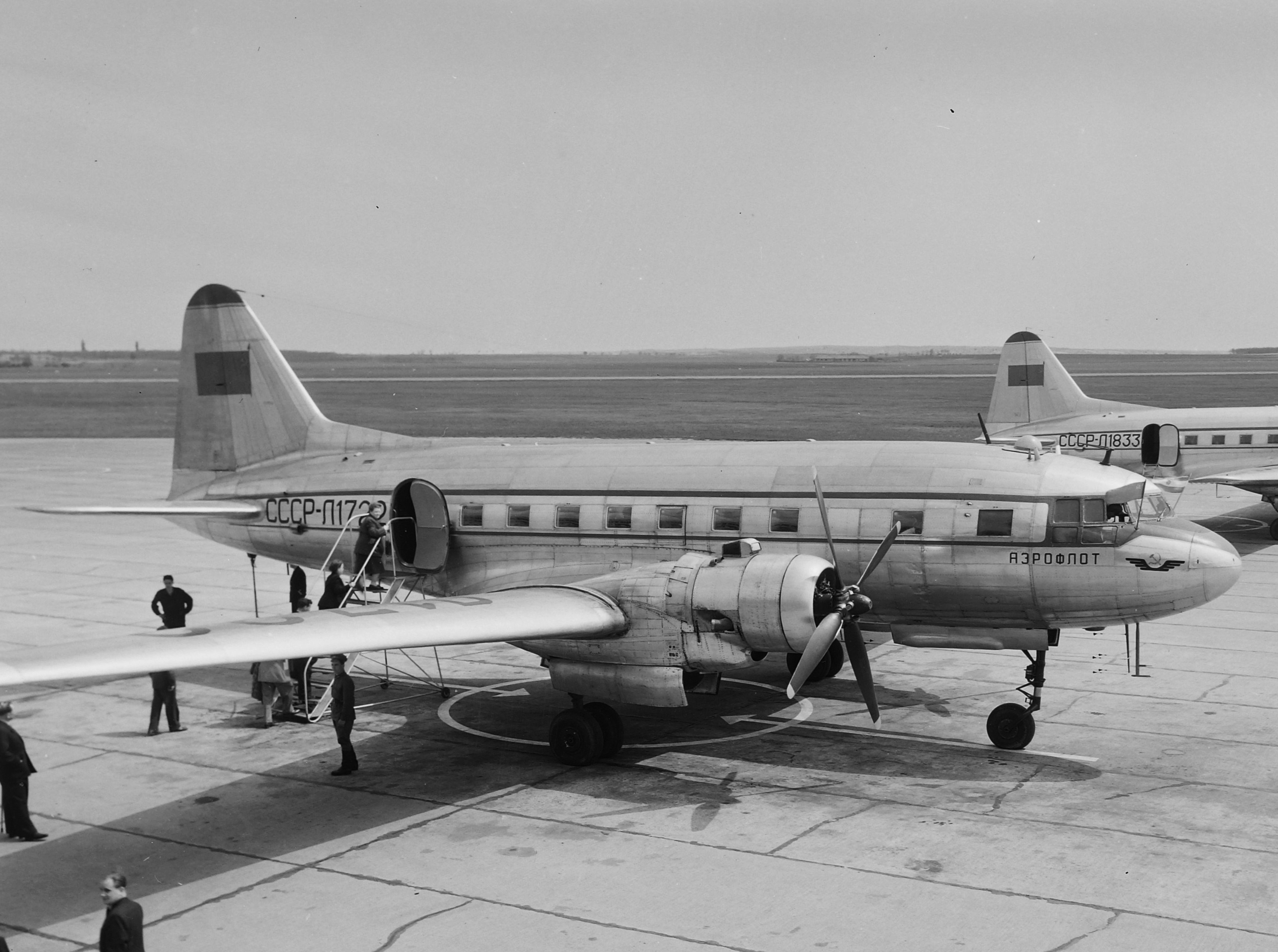
- A similar Il-12 to the accident aircraft.

Accident
- Date: 27 September 1954
- Summary: Controlled flight into terrain
- Site: Near Severny Airport, USSR

Aircraft
- Aircraft type: Ilyushin Il-12P
- Operator: Aeroflot
- Registration: СССР-Л1365
- Flight origin: Yuzhno-Sakhalinsk Airport, Yuzhno-Sakhalinsk, USSR
- 1st stopover: Krasnoyarsk Airport, Krasnoyarsk, USSR
- Last stopover: Severny Airport, Novosibirsk, USSR
- Destination: Moscow Vnukovo Airport, Moscow, USSR
- Passengers: 24
- Crew: 5
- Fatalities: 29
- Survivors: 0

Aeroflot Flight 10 was a scheduled passenger flight from Yuzhno-Sakhalinsk Airport to Vnukovo Airport with stopovers at Krasnoyarsk Airport and Severny Airport. On 27 September 1954, the Ilyushin Il-12 flying this route crashed near Severny Airport after it struck trees. Of the 29 occupants onboard, none survived.

== Aircraft ==
The aircraft, an Ilyushin Il-12P registered as СССР-Л1365, went into operation in 1947. It had a factory number of 30086 and a serial number of 086. It was manufactured by Factory Number 30.

The crew consisted of:

- Pilot-in-command Aleksandr Maksimovich Usachev
- Trainee Georgiy Antonovich Sukharev
- Co-pilot Yakov Aleksandrovich Konovalov
- Flight engineer Sergey Fedorovich Shachnev
- Radio operator Yakov Yakovlevich Shestak

== Accident ==
The Il-12 departed Krasnoyarsk at 22:17. The visibility was forecast as 4–10 km (2.5–6.2 mi; 2.2–5.4 nmi) at the time of takeoff. Despite a warning being received by the station at 00:12 that the airport was covered in fog and had poor visibility, the forecaster on duty reported the weather conditions to the crew at 00:25. As the aircraft approached Novosibirsk, the visibility worsened to about 400 m (1,300 ft). The captain abandoned the approach due to the plane being too far to the left of the runway.

After a few minutes, the crew started another approach with a visibility of 100 m (330 ft). Without sighting the ground, the pilot-in-command continued the approach, with permission from the air traffic controller, and descended below the decision height. At 00:57, the Il-12 struck trees and crashed into a wooded area near the airport, killing all 29 occupants onboard. There was no fire.

Flight 10 was approaching from the south, where there were no approach lights, and the non-directional beacon worked improperly.

== Cause ==
The investigation determined that the visibility was minimal. Furthermore, the crew did not have the runway and ground in sight. It was necessary to divert to an alternative airport, which in this case would have been Kemerovo or Barabinsk. As a consequence, the crew controlled flight into terrain.

The investigation listed these factors as the causes of the accident:

- The decision of the crew to land in minimal weather
- Failure of the air traffic controller to inform the pilots about the foggy weather
- The absence of radio equipment in the airport to communicate with aircraft in the south
