= Magdagachi Airport =

Military airport in Magdagachi, Amur Oblast, Russia

Magdagachi
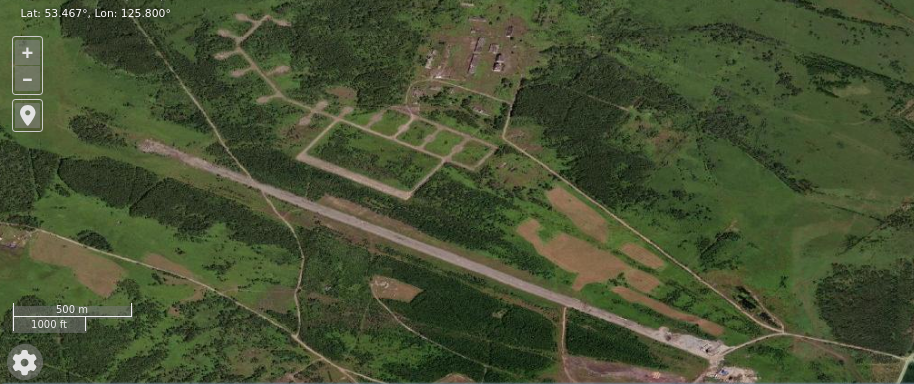
- Satellite imagery of Magdagachi Airport
- IATA: GDG; ICAO: UHBI

Summary
- Airport type: Military
- Operator: Russian Army
- Location: Magdagachi
- Elevation AMSL: 1,211 ft / 369 m
- Coordinates: 53°28′0″N 125°48′0″E
- Interactive map of Magdagachi

Runways
Direction	Length		Surface
Direction	ft	m	Surface
	5,905	1,800	Concrete

Magdagachi Airport (IATA: GDG, ICAO: UHBI) is a small airport in Russia's Amur Oblast, located 3 km north of Magdagachi. It is an old 1960s-era base in poor condition due to poor maintenance and the often harsh local climate. Satellite images show that it has a hardened runway, 10 revetments, and a small tarmac apron. During the mid-1970s the U.S. Department of Defense cited this as one of the bases used by the Soviet Union's first two identified air assault brigades. This brigade was the 13th Separate Air Assault Brigade, formed in 1969.

== See also ==
- List of airports in Russia
