= Severny Airport =

Airport in Novosibirsk, Russia

Severny Airport Новосибирск-Северный
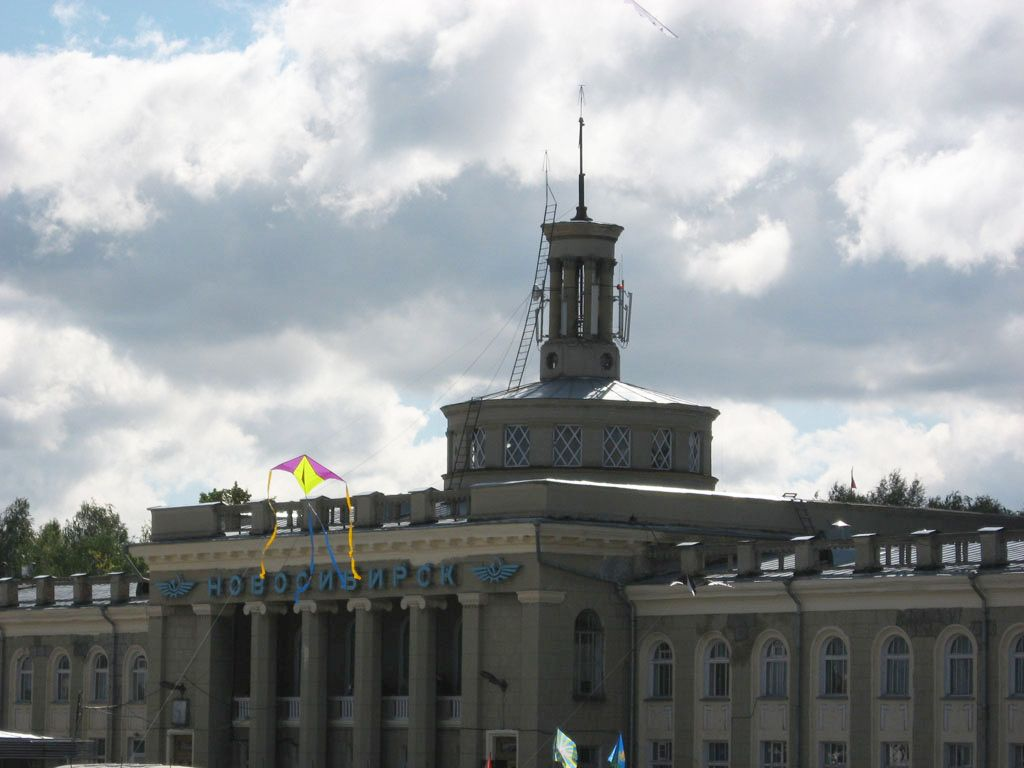
- View of the main terminal building.
- IATA: none; ICAO: UNCC

Summary
- Airport type: Public
- Operator: JSC "Novosibirsk Air Enterprise"
- Location: Novosibirsk
- Elevation AMSL: 558 ft / 170 m
- Coordinates: 55°5′30″N 82°54′24″E
- Interactive map of Severny Airport

Runways
Direction	Length		Surface
Direction	ft	m	Surface
02/20	5,426	1,654	Asphalt

Severny Airport (Russian: Аэропорт "Северный", English: Northern airport) (ICAO: UNCC) was a small airport in northern part of Novosibirsk, Russia. Opened in 1929, it was the only airport in Novosibirsk until Tolmachevo Airport opened in 1957. JSC "Novosibirsk Air Enterprise" was the main airline operating out of this airport, serving regional routes by An-2, An-24, An-26, An-30, and Let-410 aircraft.

Following the second bankruptcy of Novosibirsk Air Enterprise (after which the airline ceased operations) in 2010, the airport closed in February 2011. As of 2015, part of its airfield is used as a heliport for local police helicopters and a nearby aircraft maintenance facility.

== See also ==
- List of airports in Russia
