= Minsk-1 Airport =

Former airport of Minsk, Belarus

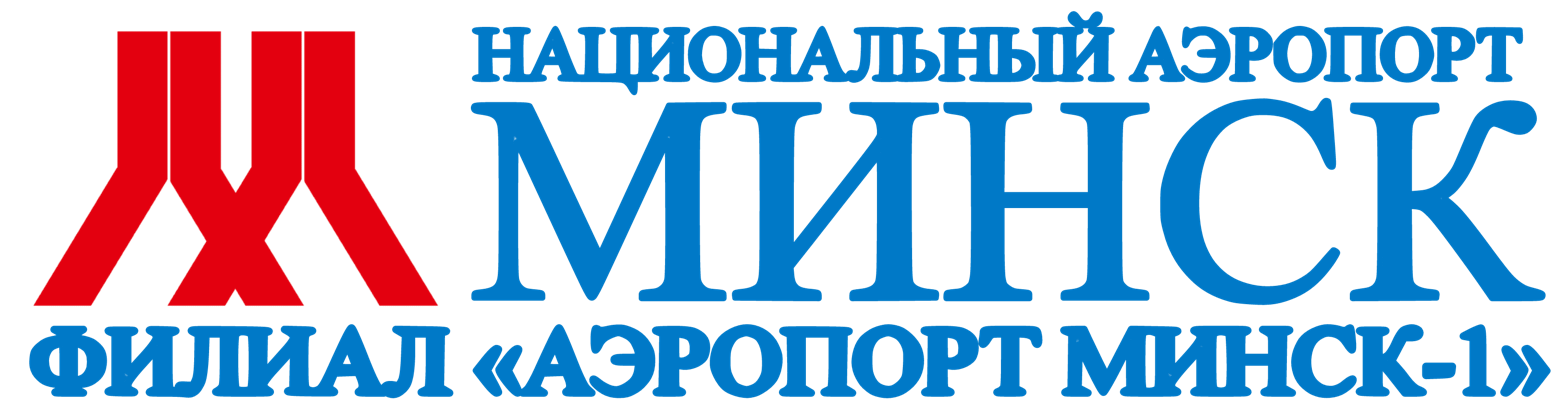
- Logo of Minsk-1 Airport

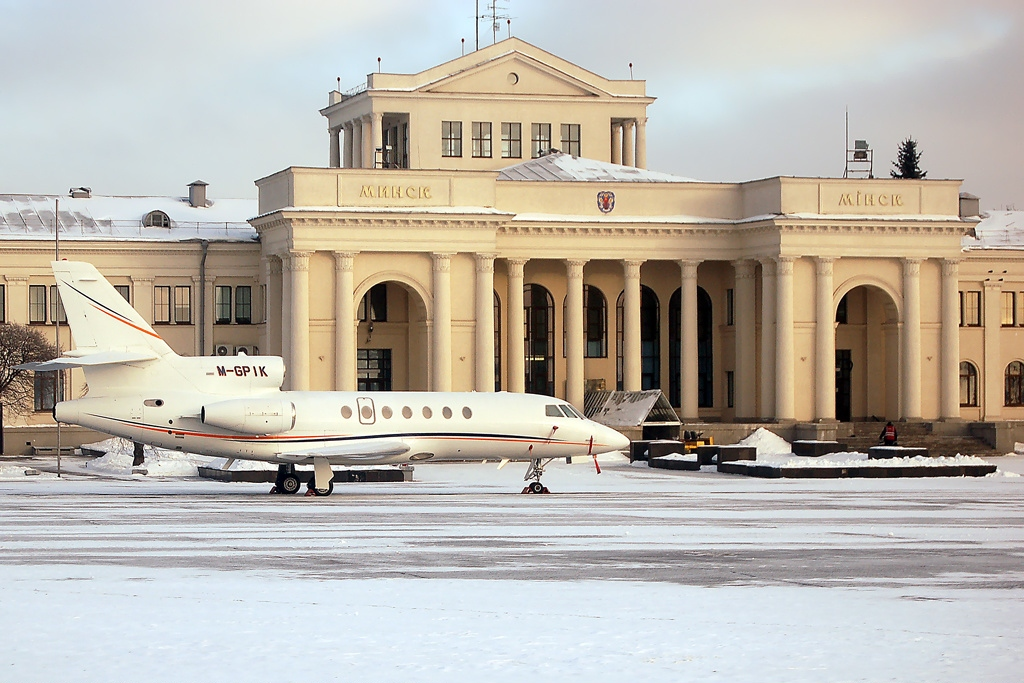
- Minsk-1 Airport in 2010
- IATA: MHP; ICAO: UMMM

Summary
- Airport type: Defunct
- Serves: Minsk, Belarus
- Opened: 7 November 1933
- Closed: 23 December 2015
- Elevation AMSL: 748 ft / 228 m
- Coordinates: 53°51′52″N 27°32′23″E
- Interactive map of Minsk-1 Airport

Runways
Direction	Length		Surface
Direction	ft	m	Surface
12/30	6,562	2,000	Asphalt (Closed)

Minsk-1 Airport (IATA: MHP, ICAO: UMMM) was an airport located just a few kilometres south from the centre of Minsk in Belarus. It served as the main airport for Minsk from 1933 to 1982, when Minsk-2 Airport was commissioned. From 1982 until closure in 2015 it served as a secondary airport.

== History ==
Minsk-1 was built in 1933 roughly five kilometres to the south of the historical centre. It was the major airport of Minsk until the new airport Minsk-2, now named Minsk National Airport, opened in 1982.

After 1982, it mainly served domestic routes in Belarus and short-haul routes to Moscow, Kyiv and Kaliningrad. Minsk-1 was closed in December 2015 because of the noise pollution in the surrounding residential areas. The land of the airport is currently being redeveloped for residential and commercial real estate, branded as Minsk-City, as well as the new Zelenaluzhskaya line of the Minsk Metro.

In February 2006 a decision was made to transfer the Minsk aircraft repair plant situated on the Minsk-1 site out of the city line. In 2018 Aircraft Repair Plant Avia407 completed its move to the new Minsk National Airport. 320 ha of freed land will be transferred to the city authorities for real estate development. Commercial flights were scheduled until 26 October 2012 when flights to Moscow-Vnukovo operated by UTair Aviation moved to the larger Minsk National Airport.

The airport officially shut down on 23 December 2015.

The remaining buildings were demolished in 2019. As of 2025, the airport land and its surroundings are being redeveloped into a new residential and commercial district, known as "Minsk World" («Минск Мир»).
