= Linee Aeree Italiane Flight 451 (1954) =

1954 aircraft accident in New York

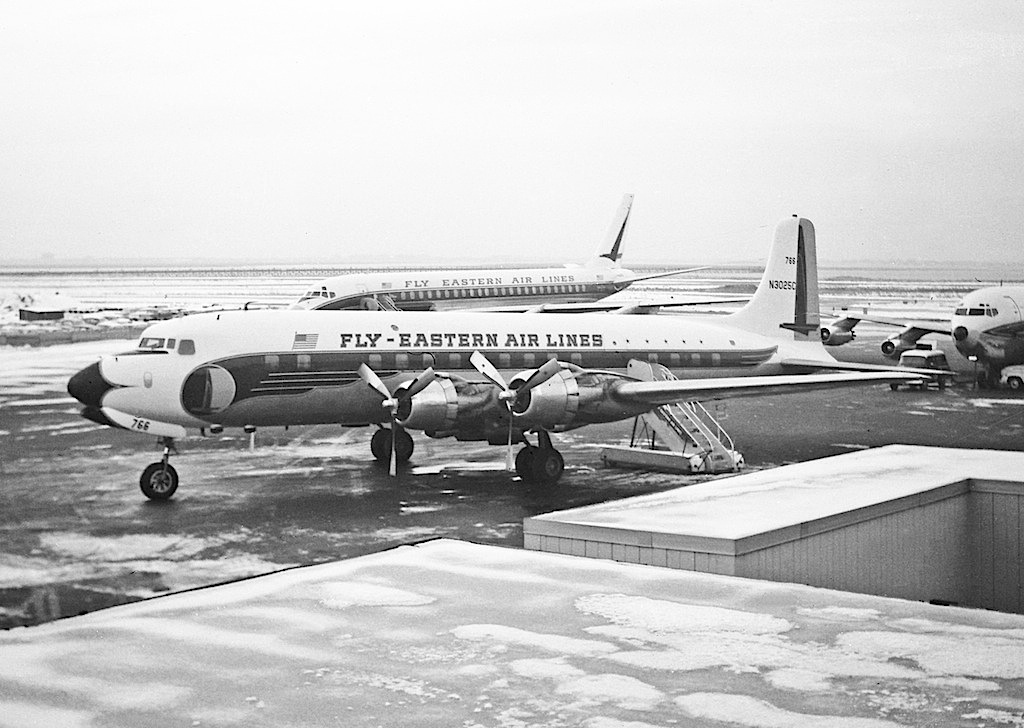
- A Douglas DC-6B, similar to the accident aircraft

Accident
- Date: December 18, 1954
- Summary: Controlled flight into terrain, pilot error
- Site: New York-Idlewild Airport, New York City

Aircraft
- Aircraft type: Douglas DC-6B
- Operator: Linee Aeree Italiane
- Registration: I-LINE
- Flight origin: Rome, Italy
- Stopover: ~~Milan, Italy~~ (skipped)
- 2nd stopover: ~~Paris Orly Airport, France~~ (skipped)
- 3rd stopover: Shannon Airport, Ireland
- 4th stopover: Gander International Airport, Canada
- 5th stopover: Boston International Airport, United States
- Destination: New York-Idlewild Airport, United States
- Occupants: 32
- Passengers: 22
- Crew: 10
- Fatalities: 26
- Survivors: 6

Linee Aeree Italiane Flight 451 was a scheduled international flight from Rome to New York City. On the 18th of December, 1954 it descended too low and crashed into a pier while on approach to New York City's Idlewild airport. All 10 crew and 16 out of 22 passengers were killed.

== Background ==
=== Aircraft ===
The accident aircraft was a Douglas DC-6B with the serial number 44418 and Italian registry I-LINE. It was manufactured on the 24th of June, 1954, and had since accumulated 1,412 flight hours.

=== Crew ===
In command was Captain Guglielmo Algarotti, age 52, had accumulated 14,734 flight hours. First Officer Vittorio Bortignoni, age 39, had a total of 4,674 flight hours. Second Pilot Francesco Miraglia, age 35, had 2,005 flight hours. Flight Engineer Umberto Cheli, age 48, had 6,900 flight hours. Flight Engineer Ernesto Leone, age 48, had accumulated 1,580 flight hours. The flight crew also included Radio Operator Mario Parodi, age 47.

== Flight ==
Flight 451 departed Rome at 18:40 Greenwich time on December 17, an hour and ten minutes behind schedule. Stops at Milan and Paris were cancelled due to weather, and the flight proceeded to Shannon where it landed at 23:20. The aircraft crossed the Atlantic and reached Gander and Boston with no difficulty. The crew reported to Idlewild approach control at 11:22 EST, and was cleared to enter a holding pattern 13 nautical miles southwest of the airport. Due to poor weather conditions, the flight continued to circle until it was cleared for approach to runway 22 at 11:59, however this approach was discontinued 19 minutes later and the flight returned to the holding pattern. The crew received clearance for an ILS approach to runway 04 at 13:07, however this approach was aborted as well. Another approach was attempted shortly after, this time a Ground Controlled Approach, but was abandoned as well. At 13:49 the flight was cleared for a fourth approach to the airport, an ILS approach to runway 04.

The approach was erratic, first deviating to the right of the localizer course and descended below the glide path (the optimal descent profile). The controller alerted the crew to this, to which they responded by turning to the left past the localizer course and several hundred feet left of it, and by climbing, although it was insufficient to correct their altitude. The aircraft then again descended, and after another warning by the controller the crew again executed an abrupt climb, reaching the glide slope. However the plane again started descending and at 14:00 the left wing struck a pier that supported the approach lights extending 770 meters from the approach end of runway 04, exploding into flames. The aircraft continued for around 300 meters, rotating 180 degrees, before crashing in the 10 meter deep water and sinking beside the pier.

== Investigation ==
The crash was investigated by the Civil Aeronautics Board. Even though the last and fatal approach was being made with the help of ILS, which allowed the crew to see the optimal path to touchdown, both vertically (glide slope) and horizontally (localizer), the plane was always off this path, suggesting that the crew didn't use this assistance and descended visually, hoping to break out of the clouds and see the runway. They may have, while descending, broken out of a fog bank and saw that they were only 200 feet from the water, leading them to climb back into the clouds. The pilots would probably have then descended again to regain visual contact or to stop the ascent, causing them to fall to an even lower altitude than before. The crew again climbed to avoid impact. A third descent was then commenced. It was suggested by the investigators that during the final descent the crew may have been fooled by the approach lights, though it can't be known.

Fatigue is believed to have played a large role in the accident. Even though there is no reason to believe procedures regarding rest time were broken, not only did the flight from Rome to New York last 22 1/2 hours, the crew then spent 2 1/2 hours in a holding pattern, and would have been mentally and physically exhausted by the time of the accident.

The board determines that the probable cause of this accident was an erratic approach which resulted in a descent to an altitude too low to avoid striking the pier. A contributing factor to this accident was pilot fatigue due to the particular and difficult circumstances.

— Civil Aeronautics Board
