= Liam Davison =

Australian author (1957–2014)

- Born: Liam Patrick Davison; 29 July 1957; Melbourne, Victoria, Australia
- Died: 17 July 2014 (aged 56); Malaysia Airlines Flight 17, near Hrabove, Ukraine
- Occupations: Novelist, reviewer
- Spouse: Frankie Davison (also died on 17 July 2014)

Liam Patrick Davison (29 July 1957 – 17 July 2014) was an Australian novelist and reviewer. He was born in Melbourne, where, until 2007, he taught creative writing at the Chisholm Institute in Frankston.

== Biography ==
Davison was educated at St Bede's College, Melbourne and Melbourne Teacher's College. He was awarded the National Book Council's Banjo Award for Fiction in 1993 and shortlisted for several literary prizes such as The Age Book of the Year Award and the Victorian Premier's Literary Award. His work has appeared in many Australian literary anthologies. He was an occasional reviewer for The Australian newspaper.

== Death ==
Davison and his wife Frankie, a teacher at Toorak College, were among 298 people who died on 17 July 2014 aboard Malaysia Airlines Flight 17, which was shot down over Ukraine by Russian mercenaries during the War in Donbas.

== Publications ==
- The Velodrome (1988)
- The Shipwreck Party (Short stories) (1989)
- Soundings (1993)
- The White Woman (1994)
- The Betrayal (1999)
- The Spirit of Australia (with Jim Conquest) (1999)
- The Florilegium (2001)
- Collected Stories (1999, 2001, 2003, 2011, 2012, 2013)
