= Shuba Jay =

Malaysian businesswoman and actress (1976–2014)

- Shuba Jay in 2013
- Born: Shubashini Jeyaratnam; 15 July 1976
- Died: 17 July 2014 (aged 38); Malaysian Airlines Flight 17, near Hrabove, Ukraine
- Occupations: Actress, businesswoman
- Years active: 2001–2014
- Spouse: Paul Goes (m. 2010)
- Children: 1
- Website: shubajay.com (archived)

Shubashini "Shuba" Jeyaratnam (15 July 1976 – 17 July 2014), also known by stage names Shuba Jay and Shuba Jaya, was a Malaysian entrepreneur, stage performer, and actress who achieved popularity through her roles in several TV shows. Of Indian Tamil descent, she was killed, together with her husband and daughter, in the shootdown of Malaysia Airlines Flight 17.

== Career ==
In her university studies she received a Bachelor of Arts in Communications. After working as a copywriter for the New Straits Times, Jay worked in the newspaper's advertising studio before moving to the advertising department. In 2009 she was part of the 15Malaysia project, a series of short films on various socio-political themes. In 2010, Jay and her father took part in the reality TV show Mari Menari (Malay for Let's Dance) on Astro Ria. In 2011, she started acting and became known for her role in several local TV shows such as Spanar Jaya, Gadis 3 and Sugumana Sumaigal. She also appeared in several local films such as Relationship Status (2012) and Tokak (2013), and performed on stage in Fourplay, Charley's Auntie and Hungry for Hope.

== Personal life ==
Jay met her Dutch future husband, Paul Goes, during a holiday in Vietnam. Shortly after her marriage in 2010, Jay became an advocate for breastfeeding and home birthing. The home birth of her daughter Kaela was reported in local media. According to The Wall Street Journal, she was known to her fans as "Shuba Jay".

She was recognised by Prestige Magazine as one of Malaysia's top 40 individuals under the age of 40.

== Death ==
Jay and her family were on board Malaysia Airlines Flight 17 when it was shot down by Russian mercenaries during the war in Donbas on 17 July 2014, killing all people on board. Many local actors and film directors expressed shock at her sudden death, which took place just two days after her 38th birthday.

Newsbook published an interview with the husband of her husband's sister. According to the interview, Jay was a well-known actress in Malaysia who wanted to continue working on her career outside of her home country.

The bodies of Shuba Jay and her family arrived in Malaysia on 2 September, and funeral rites were conducted the same day at the Nirvana Memorial Centre.
