= Malaysia Airlines Flight 17 =

2014 aircraft shootdown over Ukraine

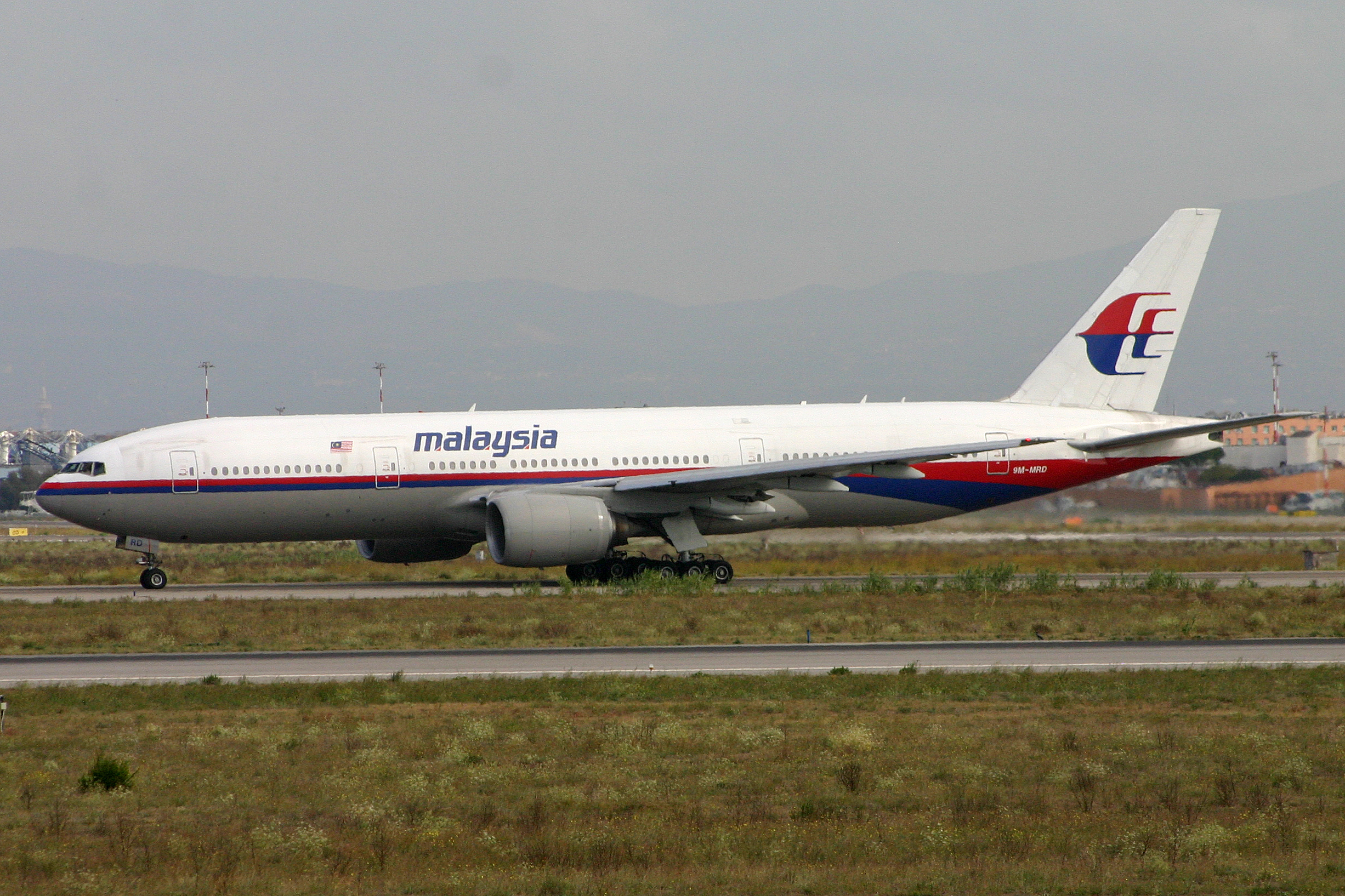
- 9M-MRD, the aircraft involved, seen in 2011

Shootdown
- Date: 17 July 2014
- Summary: Shot down by a Buk 9M38 surface-to-air missile transported from Russia on the day of the crash
- Site: Near Hrabove, Donetsk Oblast, Ukraine; 48°08′18.1″N 38°38′21.3″E

Aircraft
- Aircraft type: Boeing 777-2H6ER (Note: The aircraft was a Boeing 777–200 (Extended Range "ER") model; Boeing assigns a unique code for each company that buys one of its aircraft, which is applied as an infix to the model number at the time the aircraft is built, hence "777-2H6(ER)" designates a 777–200 built for Malaysia Airlines (customer code H6).)
- Operator: Malaysia Airlines
- IATA flight No.: MH17
- ICAO flight No.: MAS17
- Call sign: MALAYSIAN 17
- Registration: 9M-MRD
- Flight origin: Amsterdam Airport Schiphol, Haarlemmermeer, Netherlands
- Destination: Kuala Lumpur International Airport, Sepang District, Malaysia
- Occupants: 298
- Passengers: 283
- Crew: 15
- Fatalities: 298
- Survivors: 0

Malaysia Airlines Flight 17 (Note: MH is the IATA designator. The flight was also marketed as KLM Flight 4103 (KLM4103) through a codeshare, and has been commonly referred to as "MH17", "Flight 17" or "Flight MH17".) was a scheduled passenger flight from Amsterdam to Kuala Lumpur that was shot down by Russian-backed forces with a Buk 9M38 surface-to-air missile on 17 July 2014, while flying over eastern Ukraine. All 283 passengers and 15 crew were killed. Contact with the aircraft, a Boeing 777-200ER, was lost when it was about 50 kilometres (31 mi; 27 nmi) from the Ukraine–Russia border, and wreckage from the aircraft landed near Hrabove in Donetsk Oblast, Ukraine, 40 km (25 mi; 22 nmi) from the border. The shoot-down occurred during the war in Donbas over territory controlled by Russian separatist forces in Ukraine.

The responsibility for investigation was delegated to the Dutch Safety Board (DSB) and the Dutch-led joint investigation team (JIT), which in 2016 reported that the aircraft had been downed by a Buk surface-to-air missile launched from pro-Russian separatist-controlled territory in Ukraine. The JIT found that the Buk originated from the 53rd Anti-Aircraft Missile Brigade of the Russian Federation and had been transported from Russia on the day of the crash, fired from a field in a rebel-controlled area, and that the launch system returned to Russia the following day.

The findings by the DSB and JIT were consistent with earlier claims by American and German intelligence sources and by the Ukrainian government. On the basis of the JIT's conclusions, the governments of the Netherlands and Australia held Russia responsible for the deployment of the Buk installation and began pursuing legal remedies in May 2018. The Russian government denied involvement in the shooting down of the aircraft, and its account of how the aircraft was shot down has varied over time. Coverage in Russian media has also differed from that in other countries, which initially characterised it as separatist forces shooting down a "Ukrainian Air Force An-26 transport plane" before switching to blaming Ukrainian forces for shooting down MH17.

On 17 November 2022, following a trial in absentia in the Netherlands, two Russians and a Ukrainian separatist were found guilty of murdering all 298 people on board flight MH17. The Dutch court also ruled that Russia was in control of the separatist forces fighting in eastern Ukraine at the time.

MH17 was Malaysia Airlines' second aircraft loss during 2014, after the disappearance of Flight 370 four months prior on 8 March. It is also the deadliest aircraft shoot-down incident to date and was the deadliest plane crash of the 2010s.

== Aircraft ==
Flight 17, which was also marketed as KLM Flight 4103 (KL4103) through a codeshare agreement, was operated with a Boeing 777-2H6ER, (Note: The aircraft is a Boeing 777-200ER (for Extended Range) model; Boeing assigns a unique customer code for each company that buys one of its aircraft, which is incorporated into the model number when the aircraft is built. The code for Malaysia Airlines is "H6", hence "777-2H6ER".) serial number 28411, registration 9M-MRD. Powered by two Rolls-Royce Trent 892 engines and carrying 280 seats (33 business and 247 economy), the aircraft had recorded more than 76,300 hours in 11,430 cycles before the crash. The aircraft was in an airworthy condition at departure.

The Boeing 777, which entered commercial service on 7 June 1995, has one of the best safety records among commercial aircraft. In June 2014, there were about 1,212 aircraft in service, with 340 more on order.

== Passengers and crew ==
People on board by nationality
Nation	Number
Australia	27
Belgium	4
Canada (Note: Including: 1 dual Canadian-Romanian citizen)	1
Germany (Note: Including: 1 dual German-Dutch citizen)	4
Indonesia	12
Malaysia (Note: 28 passengers and 15 crew)	43
Netherlands (Note: Including: 1 dual Dutch-Belgian citizen; 1 dual Dutch-Israeli citizen; 1 dual Dutch-Italian citizen; 1 dual Dutch-American citizen; 1 dual Dutch-Malaysian citizen; 3 Dutch-Vietnamese citizens)	193
New Zealand	1
Philippines	3
United Kingdom (Note: Including: 1 dual British-South African citizen; 1 dual British-New Zealand citizen)	10
Total	298

The incident is the deadliest airliner shoot-down incident to date. All 283 passengers and 15 crew died. By 19 July, the airline had determined the nationalities of all 298 passengers and crew.

The crew were all Malaysian, while over two-thirds (68%) of the passengers were Dutch. Most of the other passengers were Malaysians and Australians; the remainder were citizens of seven other countries. At least twenty family groups were on the aircraft, and eighty passengers were under the age of 18.

Among the passengers were delegates en route to the 20th International AIDS Conference in Melbourne, including Joep Lange, a former president of the International AIDS Society, which organised the conference. Many initial reports had erroneously indicated that around 100 delegates to the conference were aboard, but this was later revised to six. Also on board were Dutch Senator Willem Witteveen, Australian author Liam Davison, and Malaysian actress Shuba Jay.

The flight crew were captains Wan Amran bin Wan Hussin (49) and Eugene Choo Jin Leong (44), and first officers Ahmad Hakimi bin Hanapi (29) and Muhamad Firdaus bin Abdul Rahim (26). Captain Wan Amran had a total of 13,239 flight hours, including 7,989 in Boeing 777s. Captain Choo had a total of 12,385 flight hours, including 7,303 in Boeing 777s. First Officer Ahmad had a total of 3,190 flight hours, including 227 in Boeing 777s. First Officer Firdaus had a total of 4,058 flight hours, including 296 in Boeing 777s. (Note: The family name is Choo, as the Chinese name is Choo Jin Leong (Chinese: 朱仁隆; pinyin: Zhū Rénlóng; Pe̍h-ōe-jī: Chu Jîn-liông). He should be referred to by his family name, Choo. Ethnic Malays, such as the other three pilots, do not have family names, and so they are referred to by their given names.)

== Background ==
The armed conflict in Eastern Ukraine led some airlines to avoid eastern Ukrainian airspace in early March 2014 due to safety concerns. In the months prior to 17 July, reports circulated in the media on the presence of weapons, including surface-to-air missiles, in the hands of the rebels that were fighting the Ukrainian government in eastern Ukraine.

On 26 May, a spokesperson of the Ukrainian Armed Forces stated that a surface-to-air missile system that was being used by the rebels near Donetsk airport had been destroyed by a helicopter of the Ukrainian army. On 6 June 2014 The International New York Times reported that surface-to-air missiles had been seized from military bases. On 11 June, the newspaper Argumenty nedeli reported that a Buk-M1 missile launcher had been present in an area under the separatists' control. On 29 June the Russian news agencies reported that insurgents had obtained a Buk missile system after having taken control of Ukrainian military unit A-1402; and the Donetsk People's Republic claimed possession of such a system in a since-deleted tweet.

Such air defence systems cannot reliably identify and avoid civilian aircraft. The Ukrainian authorities declared in the media that this system was not operational. According to the subsequent statement of the Security Service of Ukraine, three Buk missile systems were located on militia-controlled territory at the time that Malaysia Airlines Boeing 777 was shot down. On the night following the downing of MH17, two Buk launcher vehicles, one of which carried three missiles, (out of a normal complement of four), was observed moving into Russia.

Several aircraft from the Ukrainian Air Force were shot down in the months and days preceding the MH17 incident. On 14 June 2014, a Ukrainian Air Force Ilyushin Il-76 military transport was shot down on approach to Luhansk International Airport, with loss of nine crew members and forty troops. On 14 July 2014, a Ukrainian Air Force An-26 transport aircraft flying at 6,500 m (21,300 ft) was shot down. The militia reportedly claimed via social media that a Buk missile launcher, which they had previously seized and made operational, had been used to bring down the aircraft. American officials later said evidence suggested the aircraft had been shot down from Russian territory.

On 16 July, the Ministry of Defence of Ukraine reported that at about 13:00 local time "terrorists" used MANPADs against a Su-25 jet which was performing a flight mission in the ATO zone. According to the report, the jet received minor damage and was forced to make a landing. Later, the Ministry of Defence of Ukraine reported on the second Su-25 that was attacked on the same day at about 19:00 local time near the Ukrainian-Russian border in the area of Amvrosiivka. According to the details reported by Ukraine's RNBO spokesperson Andriy Lysenko, the Ukrainian Su-25 was shot down by an R-27T medium range air-to-air missile fired by a MiG-29 jet from Russian territory while the Su-25 was at an altitude of 8,250 m. The Russian Defence Ministry said that the accusations were false. In response to additional questions by the Dutch Safety Board, the Ukrainian authorities reported that a "provisional investigation" had revealed that the aircraft had been shot down while flying at an altitude of 6,250 m. Ukrainian authorities also thought that the Su-25 could have been shot down with a Pantsir missile system from Russian territory, though they thought this less likely.

On 17 July, an Associated Press journalist saw a Buk launcher in Snizhne, in Donetsk Oblast, 16 kilometres (10 mi) southeast of the crash site. The reporter also saw seven separatist tanks near the town. Associated Press journalists reported that the Buk M-1 was operated by a man "with unfamiliar fatigues and a distinctive Russian accent" escorted by two civilian vehicles. The battle around Savur-Mohyla has been suggested as the possible context in which the missile that brought down MH17 was fired, as separatists deployed increasingly sophisticated anti-aircraft weaponry in this battle, and had brought down several Ukrainian jets in July.

In April, the International Civil Aviation Organization had warned governments that there was a risk to commercial passenger flights over south-eastern Ukraine. The American Federal Aviation Administration issued restrictions on flights over Crimea, to the south of MH17's route, and advised airlines flying over some other parts of Ukraine to "exercise extreme caution". This warning did not include the MH17 crash region. 37 airlines continued overflying eastern Ukraine and about 900 flights crossed the Donetsk region in the seven days before the Boeing 777 was shot down. Russian air traffic controllers issued a notice effective 17 July at 00:00 with two conflicting altitude restrictions in the airspace in the adjacent area over Russia below 32,000 feet (9,800 m) and below 53,000 feet (16,000 m). Long-distance flights typically travel at altitudes of 33,000 to 44,000 feet, so the second restriction would effectively close that airspace to civilian overflights, but the second restriction was not noted by the automated systems of Malaysian Airlines and the route was not changed. The reason given for the notice was "armed conflict in Ukraine". Russian authorities told the Dutch Safety Board the notice had been published "to create agreement with the adjoining Ukrainian airspace", but provided no clarification for the higher restriction.

The airspace above Donetsk was managed by Ukraine. The Ukrainian authorities imposed restrictions for flights under 32,000 feet (9,800 m), but did not consider closing the airspace to civil aviation completely. Like other countries, Ukraine receives overflight fees for commercial aircraft that fly over its territory and this may have contributed to the continued availability of civilian flight paths through the conflict zone. However, the Netherlands, where the main investigation was conducted, did not hold Ukraine accountable for not closing its airspace due to lack of evidence that it should have done so.

== Flight and shoot-down ==
Route of Malaysia Airlines Flight 17

Routes of Malaysia Airlines Flight 17 (MH17) and Singapore Airlines Flight 351 (SQ351), including airspace restrictions

On Thursday, 17 July 2014, Malaysia Airlines Flight 17 departed from Amsterdam Airport Schiphol Gate G3 at 12:13 CEST (10:13 UTC), thirteen minutes later than the scheduled departure time, and took off at 12:31 local time (10:31 UTC). It was due to arrive at Kuala Lumpur International Airport at 06:10 MYT on Friday, 18 July (22:10 UTC, 17 July).

=== Cruise ===
According to the original flight plan, MH17 was to fly over Ukraine at flight level 330 (33,000 feet or 10,060 metres) and then change to FL 350 around the Ukrainian city of Dnipropetrovsk. When it reached the area as planned, at 15:53 local time (12:53 UTC), Dnipropetrovsk Air Control (Dnipro Control) asked MH17 if they could climb to FL 350 as planned, and also to maintain separation from another flight, Singapore Airlines Flight 351 (SQ351), also at FL 330. The crew asked to remain at FL 330 and the air traffic controller approved this request, moving the other flight to FL 350. At 16:00 local time (13:00 UTC), the crew asked for a deviation of 20 nautical miles [nmi] (37 km; 23 mi) to the left (north) off course, on airway L980, due to weather conditions. This request was also approved by Dnipro Control ATC. The crew then asked if they could climb to FL 340, which was rejected as this flight level was not available, so MH17 remained at FL 330. At 16:19 local time (13:19 UTC), Dnipro Control noticed that the flight was 3.6 nmi (6.7 km; 4.1 mi) north of the centreline of its approved airway and instructed MH17 to return to the track. At 16:19 local time (13:19 UTC), Dnipro Control contacted Russian ATC in Rostov-on-Don (RND Control) by telephone and requested clearance to transfer the flight to Russian airspace. After obtaining permission, Dnipro Control attempted to contact MH17 for handing them off to RND Control at 16:20 local time (13:20 UTC), but the aircraft did not respond. When MH17 did not respond to several calls, Dnipro Control contacted RND Control again to check if they could see the aircraft on their radar. RND Control confirmed that the airliner had disappeared.

=== Shoot-down ===
==== Flight data recordings ====
The Dutch Safety Board reported that both the cockpit voice recorder (CVR) and the flight data recorder (FDR) stopped recording at 16:20:03 local time (13:20:03 UTC). The last FDR data indicates that the plane was at the position of 48.12715 N 38.52630538 E located west of the urban-type settlement Rozsypne (Розсипне), near Hrabove, heading east-southeast (ESE, 115°) at an altitude of 32,998 feet (10,058 m) above sea level with a ground speed of 494 knots (915 km/h; 568 mph) and an indicated airspeed of 293 knots (543 km/h; 337 mph). The flight recorders show no sign of warning or unusual occurrence prior to the end of their recordings, but two sound peaks are heard in the last 20 milliseconds of the CVR recording.

==== Missile strike ====
At 16:20:03 local time (13:20:03 UTC), a Buk ground-to-air missile, which had been launched from an area southeast of the aircraft, detonated outside the aircraft, just above and to the left of the cockpit. The blast and fragments of the missile severely damaged the cockpit and instantly killed three crew members in it. Evidence on the left engine intake ring and left wing tip suggests that the left wing and left engine had also been hit by shrapnel from the missile. An explosive decompression occurred, tearing the forward section of the aircraft into pieces, causing the middle and rear sections to tear into three sections and depressurizing the cabin. The explosive decompression could have incapacitated most occupants of the aircraft before the crash, though investigators never ruled out the possibility that some were still conscious when the aircraft hit the ground. Some occupants might have suffered serious injuries that contributed to their deaths before the crash. The aircraft fell rapidly and continued disintegrating before hitting the ground.

==== In-flight breakup ====
Investigators were able to determine how the aircraft disintegrated and crashed. The aircraft began disintegrating immediately after being struck by a missile. Investigators believed that the disintegration of the forward section of the fuselage started between the left-side cockpit windows and the forward, left-exit door. The cockpit section and the business class section of the aircraft began tearing into a number of pieces before the aircraft descended rapidly toward the ground. During that period of time, the left engine intake ring had also fallen off the engine and fell in the same place as where some of these pieces fell.

As the aircraft was falling, the instability and aerodynamic loads of the aircraft stressed its fuselage, resulting in further disintegration. Shortly before crashing into the ground, the rear section of the fuselage, just behind where the two wings were attached to the fuselage, was separated from the middle portion of the fuselage. At the same time, the two wing tips had fallen off from the wings of the aircraft. The tail section, which was just behind the aft exit doors, was also separated from the rear section. The pair of horizontal stabilizers and the vertical stabilizer were also separated from the tail section prior to impacting the ground. The middle portion, including the two wings and two engines, eventually crashed into farmland and its large volume of jet fuel exploded upon impact.

The positions of the aircraft wreckage suggest that the plane might have been upside down when the rear and middle sections disintegrated, and the middle portion probably crashed inverted while travelling rearward. Investigators could not specify the exact time when each major section of the plane hit the ground. However, they estimated that the middle portion of the aircraft had impacted the ground within 1–1 1/2 minutes after the beginning of the in-flight breakup.

=== Debris field ===
The disintegration of the plane had caused the seats, pieces of interior wall and floor, overhead compartments, and other interior structures of the aircraft to fall out. Some bodies, personal belongings, and other light objects had also fallen out of the plane. As a result of the mid-air disintegration, the debris of the plane landed in six different areas.

In the investigation report, the position where the plane was struck by a missile is identified as the "last FDR point" because it is where the flight data recorder stopped recording. A few parts of the business class and cockpit sections landed on farmland far north of the last FDR point. The business class section and the left engine intake ring landed in the large residential area of Petropavlivka, northeast of the last FDR point. The cockpit and the forward cargo section, including the nose landing gear, landed on farmland far southeast of the last FDR point and southwest of the village of Rozsypne. The tail and the rear fuselage sections landed farther east of the last FDR point, while the middle portion of the aircraft landed at 48°8′17″N 38°38′20″E, just northeast of them.

Most of the debris of the aircraft, which were the middle and rear sections, landed near the southwest of the village of Hrabove, north of Torez (now also known as Chystiakove). The wreckage had spread over a 50-square-kilometre (19 mi^{2}) area in Donetsk Oblast, eastern Ukraine. The fireball on impact is believed to have been captured on video. Photographs from the site of the crash show scattered pieces of broken fuselage and engine parts, bodies, and passports. Some of the wreckage fell close to houses. Dozens of bodies fell into crop fields, and some fell into houses.

=== Nearby aircraft ===
Three other commercial aircraft were in the vicinity when the Malaysian airliner was shot down:

- Air India Flight 113 (AI113), a flight from Delhi to Birmingham operated by a Boeing 787 Dreamliner with the aircraft registration VT-ANB.
- EVA Air Flight 88 (BR88), a Boeing 777 en route from Paris to Taipei; and
- Singapore Airlines Flight 351 (SQ351), a Boeing 777 en route from Copenhagen to Singapore which was 33 kilometres (21 mi) away, and thus the closest aircraft to MH17.

== Recovery of bodies ==
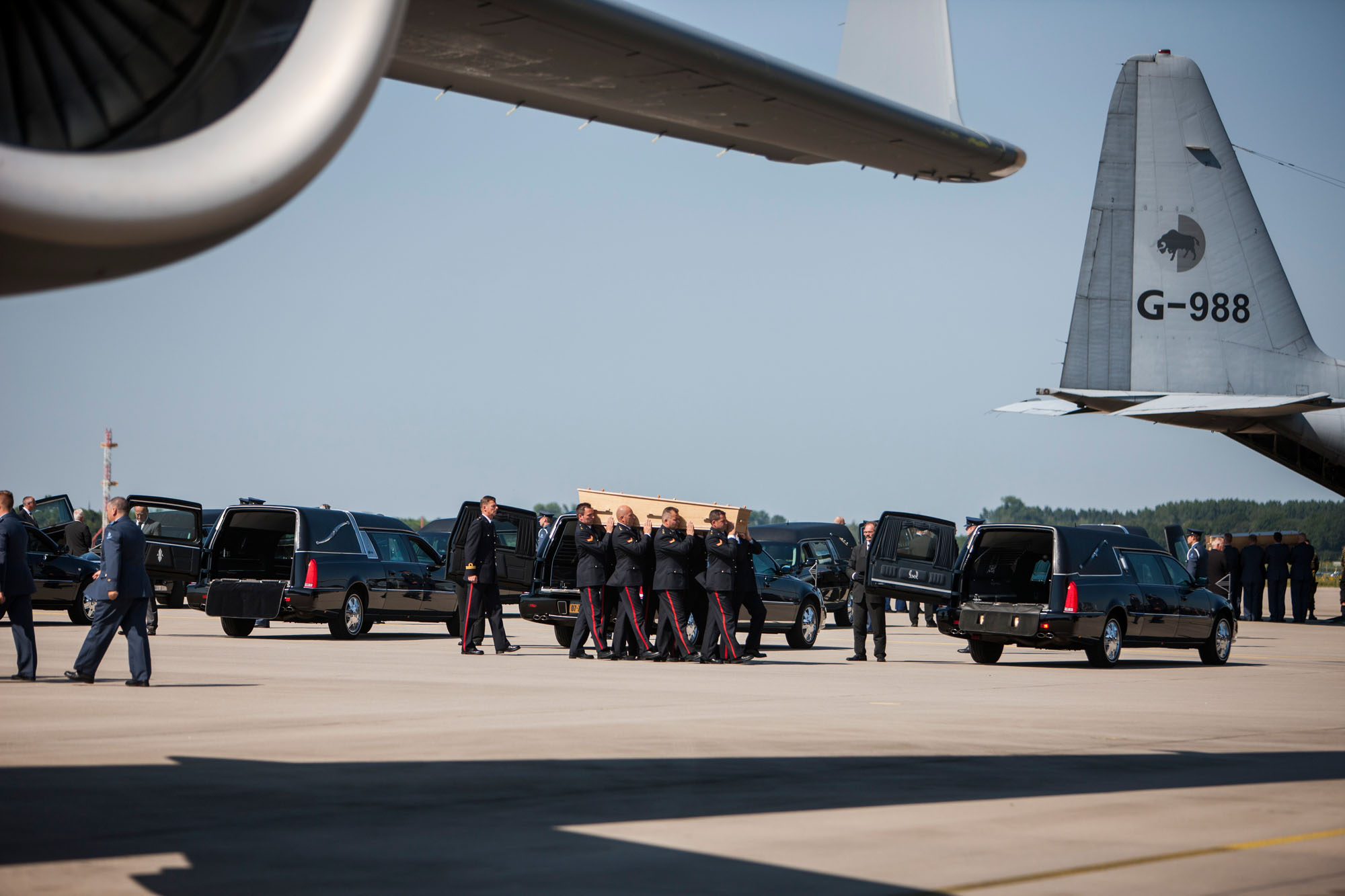
First arrival of bodies at Eindhoven Airport

A Ukraine Foreign Ministry representative said that the bodies found at the crash site would be taken to Kharkiv for identification, 270 kilometres (170 mi) to the north. By the day after the crash, 181 of the 298 bodies had been found. Some were observed being placed in body bags and loaded onto trucks.

Dutch Prime Minister Mark Rutte initially complained about looting of personal belongings from the dead and the careless handling of their bodies, but later stated they had been handled with more care than originally reported. Other media complained that credit and debit cards were being looted, and there were accusations that evidence at the crash site had been destroyed. The Guardian noted that tales of looting seemed to be exaggerated, but the chaos at the crash site risked the accidental destruction of evidence which, the paper contended, journalists were contributing to.

On 20 July, Ukrainian emergency workers, observed by armed pro-Russian separatists, began loading the remains of the passengers of MH17 into refrigerated railway wagons for transport and identification.

On 21 July, pro-Russian rebels allowed Dutch investigators to examine the bodies. By this time, 272 bodies had been recovered, according to Ukrainian officials. Remains left Torez on a train on the evening of 21 July, en route to Kharkiv to be flown to the Netherlands for identification. On the same day, Malaysian Prime Minister Najib Razak announced that the Malaysian government had reached a tentative agreement to retrieve the remains of the Malaysians who died in the crash, following any necessary forensic work.

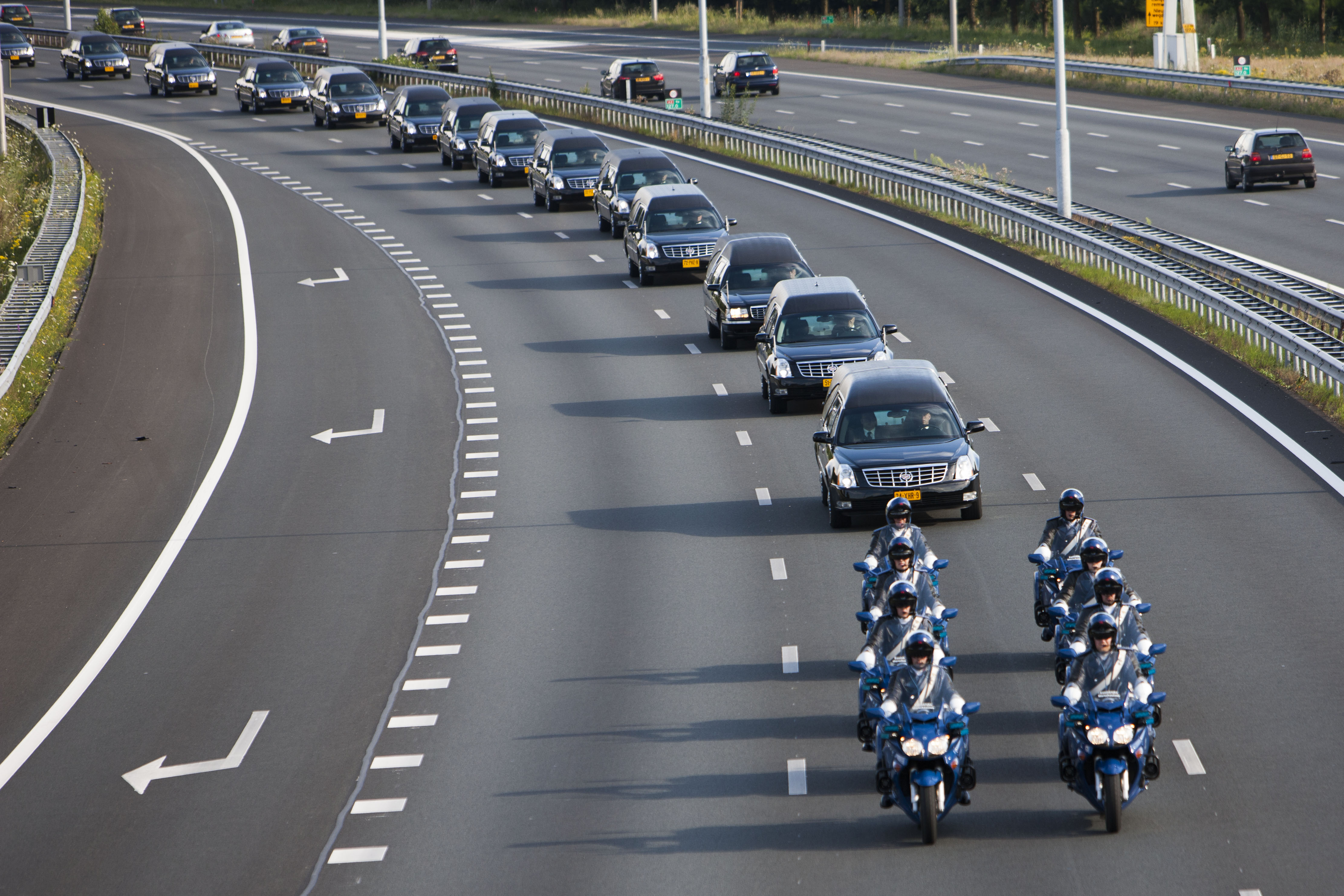
Convoy of 40 hearses heading to Hilversum, Netherlands, while other traffic stopped

It was reported on 21 July that with 282 bodies and 87 body fragments found, there were still 16 bodies missing. An agreement had been reached that the Netherlands would co-ordinate the identification effort. A train carrying the bodies arrived at the Malyshev Factory, Kharkiv on 22 July. Dutch authorities stated that they found 200 bodies on the train when it arrived at Kharkhiv, leaving almost 100 unaccounted for. In late July, the UK Metropolitan Police sent specialist officers to Ukraine to assist with the recovery, identification and repatriation of bodies.

The first remains were flown to Eindhoven in the Netherlands on 23 July, moved there with Dutch air force C-130 and Australian C-17 transport aircraft, which landed at Eindhoven Airport just before 16:00 local time. The day after, another 74 bodies arrived. The examination and identification of the bodies was conducted at the Netherlands Army medical regiment training facility in Hilversum and was coordinated by a Dutch forensic team.

On 1 August, it was announced that a search and recovery mission, including about 80 forensic police specialists from the Netherlands, Malaysia and Australia, and led by Colonel Cornelis Kuijs of the Royal Marechaussee, would use drones, sniffer dogs, divers and satellite mapping to search for missing body parts at the crash site. Australian officials had believed that as many as 80 bodies were still at the site, but after some days of searching the international team had "found remains of only a few victims" and concluded that "the recovery effort undertaken by local authorities immediately after the crash was more thorough than initially thought."

On 6 August, Dutch Prime Minister Mark Rutte announced that the recovery operation would be temporarily halted due to an upsurge in fighting around the crash site threatening the safety of crash investigators and recovery specialists, and that all international investigators and humanitarian forces conducting searches would leave the country, leaving behind a small communications and liaison team.

On 22 August, the bodies of 20 Malaysians (of 43 killed in the incident) arrived in Malaysia. The government announced a National Day of Mourning, with a ceremony broadcast live on radio and television.

On 9 October, a spokesman for the Dutch National Prosecutor's Office stated that one victim had been found with an oxygen mask around his neck; a forensic investigation of the mask for fingerprints, saliva and DNA did not produce any results, and it is therefore not known how or when the mask got around the neck of the victim.

By 5 December 2014, the Dutch-led forensic team had identified the bodies of 292 out of 298 victims of the crash. In February and April 2015, new remains were found on the site, after which only two victims, both Dutch citizens, had not been identified.

== Aftermath ==
About 90 minutes after the incident, Ukraine closed all routes in Eastern Ukrainian airspace, at all altitudes. The incident dramatically heightened fears about airliner shoot-downs, leading to some airlines announcing that they would avoid flying over the conflict zones.

Shortly after the incident, it was announced that Malaysia Airlines would retire flight number MH17 and change the Amsterdam–Kuala Lumpur route to flight number MH19 beginning on 25 July 2014, with the outbound flight MH16 unchanged. Malaysia Airlines ended its service to Amsterdam on 25 January 2016, opting to codeshare with KLM on the KUL-AMS route instead. Following the shootdown, shares in Malaysia Airlines dropped by nearly 16%.

On 23 July 2014, two Ukrainian military jets were hit by missiles at the altitude of 17,000 feet (5,200 m) close to the area of the MH17 crash. According to the Ukrainian Security Council, preliminary information indicated that the missiles came from Russia.

In July 2015, Malaysia proposed that the United Nations Security Council set up an international tribunal to prosecute those deemed responsible for the downing of the aircraft. The Malaysian resolution received the support of 11 of the 15 members in the council, with three abstentions. The resolution was vetoed by Russia. The Russian government proposed an alternative draft resolution, which would not have set up a tribunal.

== Investigation ==
Two parallel investigations were led by the Dutch, one into the technical cause of the crash, and a separate criminal inquiry. The technical report was released on 13 October 2015, and the criminal investigation reported some of their findings in September 2016. According to the Convention on International Civil Aviation, the country in which an aviation incident occurs is responsible for the investigation, but that country may delegate the investigation to another state; Ukraine has delegated the leadership of both investigations to the Netherlands.

=== On-site investigation ===
In the hours following the crash, a meeting was convened of the Trilateral Contact Group. After they had held a video conference with representatives of insurgents affiliated with the Donetsk People's Republic (who controlled the area where the aircraft crashed), the rebels promised to "provide safe access and security guarantees" to "the national investigation commission" by co-operating with Ukrainian authorities and OSCE (Organization for Security and Co-operation in Europe) monitors. During the first two days of investigation, the militants prevented the OSCE and the workers of Ukrainian Emergencies Ministry from freely working at the crash site. Andrei Purgin, a leader of the Donetsk People's Republic, declared later that "we will guarantee the safety of international experts on the scene as soon as Kiev concludes a ceasefire agreement".

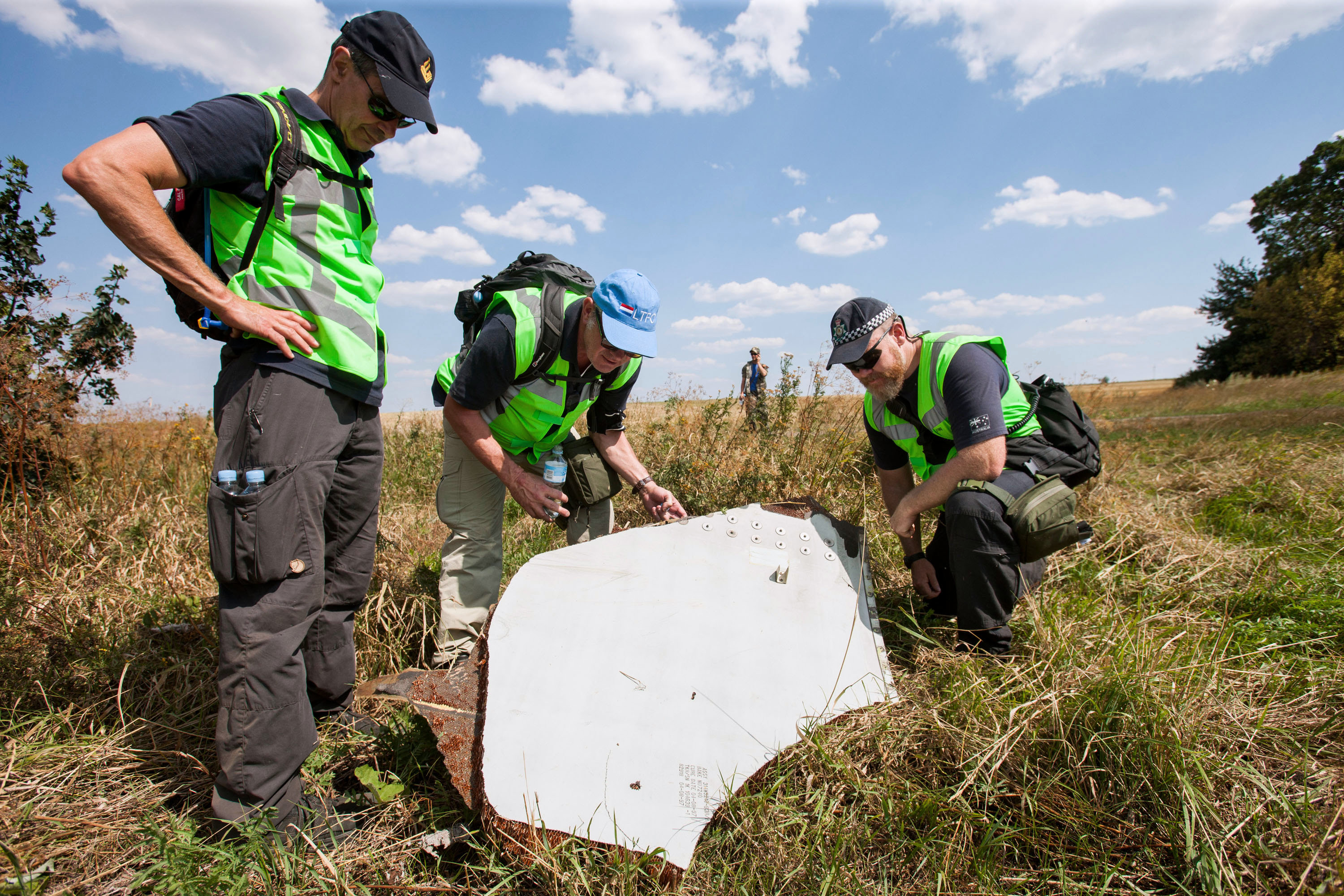
Dutch and Australian police at the crash site on 3 August 2014

By 18 July 2014, the flight data recorder and the cockpit voice recorder had been recovered by separatists, and three days later were handed over to Malaysian officials in Donetsk. The voice recorder was damaged but there was no evidence that data had been tampered with.

The National Bureau of Air Accidents Investigation of Ukraine, which led investigations, both off- and on-site, during the first days after the crash, had by August 2014 delegated the investigation to the DSB because of the large number of Dutch passengers and the flight having originated in Amsterdam.

On 22 July 2014, a Malaysian team of 133 officials, search and recovery personnel, and forensics, technical and medical experts arrived in Ukraine. Australia sent a 45-member panel headed by former Air Chief Marshal Angus Houston, who had earlier supervised the MH370 probe. Approximately 200 special forces soldiers from Australia were also deployed to provide support for the JIT investigators. The United Kingdom sent six investigators from the Air Accidents Investigation Branch (AAIB) and the UK Foreign Office sent extra consular staff to Ukraine. It took until late July before the full international team could start working at the crash site, under the leadership of the Dutch Ministry of Defence.

On 30 July 2014, a Ukrainian representative said that pro-Russian rebels had mined approaches to the crash site and moved heavy artillery.

On 6 August 2014, the experts left the crash site due to concerns about their safety. In mid-September they unsuccessfully attempted to regain access to the site. On 13 October 2014, a Dutch-Ukrainian team resumed recovery of victims' personal belongings. In mid-November 2014, work was undertaken to remove part of the wreckage from the crash site. Earlier efforts by the recovery team to salvage the MH17 wreckage had been frustrated by disagreements with the local rebels. The recovery operation took a week. The debris was transported to the Netherlands where investigators reconstructed parts of the aircraft.

In August 2015, possible Buk missile launcher parts were found at the crash site by the Dutch-led joint investigation team (JIT).

=== Cause of the crash ===
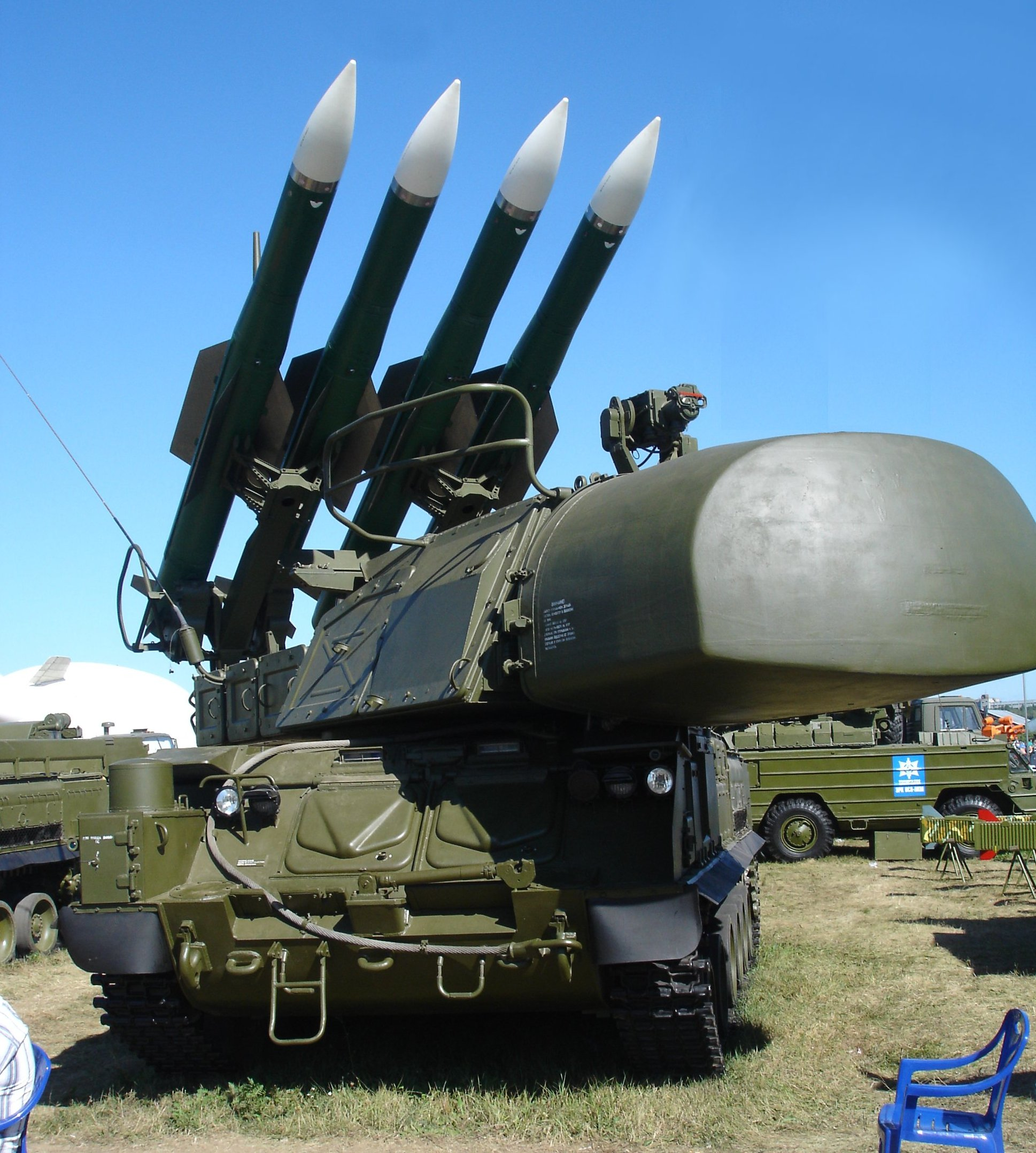
A mobile Buk surface-to-air missile launcher, similar to that used in the incident

External audio
- Pro-Russian rebels discuss the shooting down of an aircraft Intercepted phone calls, verified with voice recognition by the U.S. National Security Agency, between rebels discussing which rebel group shot down the aircraft and initial reports that it was a civilian aircraft. Audio (in Russian) released by the Security Service of Ukraine with English subtitles.

Soon after the crash, both American and Ukrainian officials said that a 9M38 series surface-to-air missile strike was the most likely cause. If so, then the missile was fired from a mobile Soviet-designed Buk missile system (NATO reporting name: SA-11 "Gadfly"). At the time, Buk was the only surface-to-air missile system known to be deployed in the region that was capable of reaching the cruising altitude of commercial air traffic. Such systems, unless they receive information from larger networks, have limited capacity to distinguish between military and civilian aircraft.

According to defence analyst Reed Foster (from Jane's Information Group), the contour of the aluminium and the blistering of the paint around many of the holes on the aircraft fragments indicate that small, high-velocity fragments entered the aircraft externally, a damage pattern indicative of a Buk. Ballistics specialist Stephan Fruhling of the Australian National University's Strategic and Defence Studies Centre concurred with this, explaining that since it struck the cockpit rather than an engine it was probably a radar-guided, rather than heat-seeking, missile equipped with a proximity fuzed warhead such as a Buk.

Shortly after the crash, Igor Girkin, leader of the Donbas separatists, was reported to have posted on social media network VKontakte, taking credit for downing a Ukrainian An-26. This news was repeated by channels in Russia, with LifeNews reporting "a new victory of Donetsk self-defence who shot down yet another Ukrainian airplane". Russian news agency TASS also reported eyewitness accounts claiming that the Donbas militia had just shot down a Ukrainian An-26 military aircraft with a missile. The separatists later denied involvement, saying they did not have the equipment or training to hit a target at that altitude. Russian media also reported that Alexander Borodai called one of the Moscow media managers 40 minutes after the crash, saying that "likely we shot down a civilian airliner".

Witnesses in Torez reported sightings on the day of the incident of what appeared to be a Buk missile launcher, and AP journalists reported sightings of a Buk system in separatist controlled Snizhne. The witness reports backed up photographs and videos which had been posted online, of the Buk launcher in rebel-held territory.

On 19 July 2014, Vitaly Nayda, the chief of the Counter Intelligence Department of the Security Service of Ukraine (SBU), told a news conference, "We have compelling evidence that this terrorist act was committed with the help of the Russian Federation. We know clearly that the crew of this system were Russian citizens." He cited what he said were recorded conversations in which separatists expressed satisfaction to Russian intelligence agents that they had brought down an aircraft. One of the separatists acknowledged that the conversations had taken place, but denied that they were related to the crash of MH17 and blamed the Ukrainian government for shooting it down. According to Nayda, a Buk launcher used in the shoot-down was moved back into Russia the night after the attack. The SBU released another recording, which they said was of pro-Russian-separatist leader Igor Bezler being told of an approaching aircraft two minutes before MH17 was shot down. Bezler said the recording was real, but referred to a different incident. The head of the SBU, Valentyn Nalyvaichenko, later claimed that rebels had intended to shoot down a Russian airliner in a false flag operation to give Russia a pretext to invade Ukraine, but shot down MH17 by mistake.

Journalists from the Associated Press in Snizhne, Ukraine reported seeing a Buk M-1 enter the town operated by a man "with unfamiliar fatigues and a distinctive Russian accent" escorted by two civilian vehicles, which then moved off in the direction where the shoot-down later occurred. According to Ukrainian counterterrorism chief, Vitaly Nayda, after downing the airliner under separatist direction, the launcher's Russian crew quickly moved it back across the border into Russia.

American officials said that satellite data from infrared sensors detected the explosion of Flight MH17. American intelligence agencies said that analysis of the launch plume and trajectory suggested the missile was fired from an area near Torez and Snizhne. The Daily Telegraph said: "The Telegraph's own inquiries suggest the missile, an SA-11 from a Buk mobile rocket launcher, was possibly fired from a cornfield about 19 kilometres (12 mi) to the south of the epicentre of the crash site." Other sources suggest the missile was launched from the separatist-controlled town of Chernukhino. Several other media outlets including The Guardian, The Washington Post and the Sydney Morning Herald, reported that the aircraft was believed to have been downed by a rebel-fired missile.

On 28 July 2014, Ukrainian security official Andriy Lysenko announced, at a press conference, that black box recorder analysis had revealed that the aircraft had been brought down by shrapnel that caused "massive explosive decompression." Dutch officials were reported to be "stunned" by what they saw as a "premature announcement" and said that they had not provided this information.

On 8 September 2014, the BBC released new material by John Sweeney who cited three civilian witnesses from Donbas who saw the Buk launcher in the rebel-controlled territory on the day when MH17 crashed. Two witnesses said the crew of the launcher and a military vehicle escorting it spoke with Moscow accents. On the same day Ignat Ostanin, a Russian journalist, published an analysis of photos and films of Buk units moving in Russia and Ukraine in the days before and after the MH17 crash. According to Ostanin, the markings on the specific launcher suspected of being used to shoot MH17, together with the number plates of the large goods vehicle that carried the launcher, suggested that it belonged to the 53rd Anti-Aircraft Missile Brigade of the Air Defence Forces of the Russian Ground Forces.

On 8 October 2014, the president of the German Federal Intelligence Service (BND) gave a presentation about MH17 to a German parliamentary committee overseeing intelligence activities. According to Der Spiegel, the report contained a detailed analysis which concluded that pro-Russian separatists had used a captured Ukrainian Buk system to shoot down Flight MH17. The report also noted that "Russian claims the missile had been fired by Ukrainian soldiers and that a Ukrainian fighter jet had been flying close to the passenger jet were false". The Attorney General of Germany opened an investigation against unknown persons due to a suspected war crime.

Between November 2014 and May 2016, UK-based investigative collective Bellingcat made a series of claims, based on their examination of photos in social media and other open-source information. Bellingcat said that the launcher used to shoot down the aircraft was a Buk of the Russian 53rd Anti-Aircraft Missile Brigade based in Kursk, which had been transported from Donetsk to Snizhne and was controlled by separatists in Ukraine on the day of the attack, and that the Buk launcher had a serial number 332.

On 22 December 2014, the Dutch news service RTL Nieuws published a statement from an unnamed local resident who said he had witnessed the shooting down of MH17, which he said was shot down by a missile from rebel territory. He had taken photographs which he had passed to the SBU.

In January 2015, a report produced by the German investigative team CORRECT!V concluded a Buk surface-to-air missile launcher operated by the 53rd Anti-Aircraft Missile Brigade shot down MH17. Other circumstantial evidence was presented separately by various parties that supported this version, identifying specific launcher vehicle, operator name, truck transporting it and its alleged route through Russia and Ukraine.

In March 2015, Reuters published statements from named witnesses from Chervonyi Zhovten (Ukrainian: Червоний Жовтень), close to Torez and Snizhne, who said they saw the Buk rocket passing over the village when it was fired from a field around 1.5 kilometres (0.93 mi) away. It also published a statement from a witness who was said to be a separatist fighter (referred to by first name only) who confirmed that the launcher was placed in that area on the day of the Boeing crash to prevent Ukrainian airstrikes.

In July 2015, News Corp Australia published the transcript of a 17-minute video recorded at the scene shortly after the crash. The transcript and published segments of the video indicated that Russian-backed rebels arrived at the crash site expecting to find the wreckage of a military aircraft and crew who had parachuted from the aircraft.

In May 2016, Stratfor released satellite imagery taken five hours before the crash which showed a Russian Buk system travelling on a flatbed truck east through Makiivka, 40 kilometres (25 mi) away from Snizhne. Stratfor's concluded that a Buk system had moved from the Russian border toward Donetsk on 15 July 2014, and then moved back to the east on the afternoon of 17 July 2014, hours before Flight MH17 was shot down.

=== Dutch Safety Board reports ===
==== Preliminary report ====
On 9 September 2014, the preliminary report was released by the Dutch Safety Board (DSB). This preliminary report concluded that there was no evidence of any technical or operational failure in the aircraft or from the crew prior to the ending of the CVR and FDR recordings at 13.20:03 hrs (UTC). The report also said that "damage observed on the forward fuselage and cockpit section of the aircraft appears to indicate that there were impacts from a large number of high-energy objects from outside the aircraft". According to the investigators, this damage probably led to a loss of structural integrity that caused an in-flight break-up first of the forward parts of the aircraft and then of the remainder with an expansive geographic spread of the aircraft's pieces.

Tjibbe Joustra, Chairman of the Dutch Safety Board, explained that the investigation thus far pointed "towards an external cause of the MH17 crash", but determining the exact cause required further investigation. They also said that they aimed to publish the final report within a year of the crash date.

==== Final report ====
Narrated reconstruction of the missile impact, produced by the Dutch Safety Board

The Dutch Safety Board (DSB) issued its final report on the crash on 13 October 2015. The report concluded that the crash was caused by a Buk 9M38-series surface-to-air missile with a 9N314M warhead. The warhead detonated outside and above the left-hand side of the cockpit. Fragments from the exploding warhead killed the three people in the cockpit and caused structural damage to the airliner leading to an in-flight break-up resulting in a wreckage area of 50 square kilometres (19 sq mi) and loss of the lives of all 298 occupants. Based on evidence they were able to exclude meteor strikes, the aircraft having technical defects, a bomb, and an air-to-air attack as causes of the crash. Calculating the trajectory of the missile, the Dutch National Aerospace Laboratory determined that it was fired within a 320-square-kilometre (120 sq mi) area southeast of Torez. Narrowing down a specific launch site was outside the DSB's mandate. The findings did not specify who launched the Buk missile, but the area identified by the DSB was controlled by pro-Russian separatists at the time of the downing, according to the final report.

In addition to the technical investigation, the selection of the flight route was also investigated by the DSB. Some airlines had avoided eastern Ukrainian airspace prior to the MH17 shootdown, while many others, including 62 operators from 32 countries, had continued to fly routes over the region. The DSB judged that the Ukrainian authorities should have closed the airspace above eastern Ukraine prior to the incident due to the ongoing conflict and earlier military shootdowns, but noted that states involved in armed conflicts rarely did so. It recommended that such states should exercise more caution when evaluating their airspace, and that operators should more thoroughly assess the risks when selecting routes over areas of conflict.

=== Criminal investigation ===
The criminal investigation into the downing of MH17 is being led by the Public Prosecution Service of the Dutch Ministry of Justice, and is the largest in Dutch history, involving dozens of prosecutors and 200 investigators. Investigators interviewed witnesses and examined forensic samples, satellite data, intercepted communications, and information on the Web. Participating in the investigation along with the Netherlands, are the four other members of the joint investigation team (JIT), Belgium, Ukraine, Australia, and lastly, Malaysia, which joined in November 2014. Early in the investigation, the JIT eliminated accident, internal terrorist attack or air-to-air attack from another aircraft as the cause of the crash.

In December 2014, in a letter to the Security Council, the Netherlands' United Nations representative wrote that "the Dutch government is deliberately refraining from any speculation or accusations regarding legal responsibility for the downing of MH17". Also in December, the assistant secretary of the United States Department of State's European and Eurasian Affairs stated that the United States had given all of the information they held, including classified information, to the Dutch investigators and to the International Civil Aviation Organization (ICAO).

On 30 March 2015, the JIT released a Russian-language video calling for witnesses in the Donetsk and Luhansk regions who might have seen a Buk missile system. The video included some previously undisclosed recordings allegedly of tapped phone conversations between rebel fighters about the Buk. In one recording, of a conversation a few hours after the aircraft was shot down, a fighter says that a member of the Buk's accompanying crew had been left behind at a checkpoint. In another recording, dated the day after the shooting down, a rebel allegedly says the Buk system and its crew had been brought from Russia by "the Librarian". The video presented a "scenario" in which a Buk missile was transported on a Volvo low loader truck from Sievernyi (Сєверний), a town located within a kilometre of the Russian border (near Krasnodon), to Donetsk during the night of 16/17 July.

In the week following the public appeal, the JIT received more than 300 responses resulting in dozens of "serious witnesses". In 2016, the presence of the transloader of matching colour with a Buk missile was confirmed on a satellite photo of the area taken just a few hours before the downing of the airliner, which was described as "correlating with other evidence" by Stratfor who found the photo in DigitalGlobe archive.

On 9 April 2015, Dutch authorities made available 569 documents concerning the shootdown. Personal information and official interviews had been redacted. A further 147 documents were not made public.

==== Findings of the joint investigation team ====
On 28 September 2016, the JIT gave a press conference in which it concluded that the aircraft was shot down with a 9M38 Buk missile fired from a rebel-controlled field near Pervomaisky (Первомайський), a town 6 km (3.7 mi) south of Snizhne. It also found the Buk missile system used had been transported from Russia into Ukraine on the day of the crash, and then back into Russia after the crash, with one missile less than it arrived with. The JIT said they had identified 100 people, witnesses as well as suspects, who were involved in the movement of the Buk launcher, though they had not yet identified a clear chain of command to assess culpability, which was a matter for ongoing investigation. The Dutch chief prosecutor said "the evidence must stand before a court" which would render final judgement. During the investigation, the JIT recorded and assessed five billion internet pages, interviewed 200 witnesses, collected half a million photos and videos, and analysed 150,000 intercepted phone calls. According to JIT head prosecutor Fred Westerbeke the criminal investigation is based on "immense body of evidence," including testimonies of live witnesses who saw the Buk launcher, primary radar data, original photos and videos.

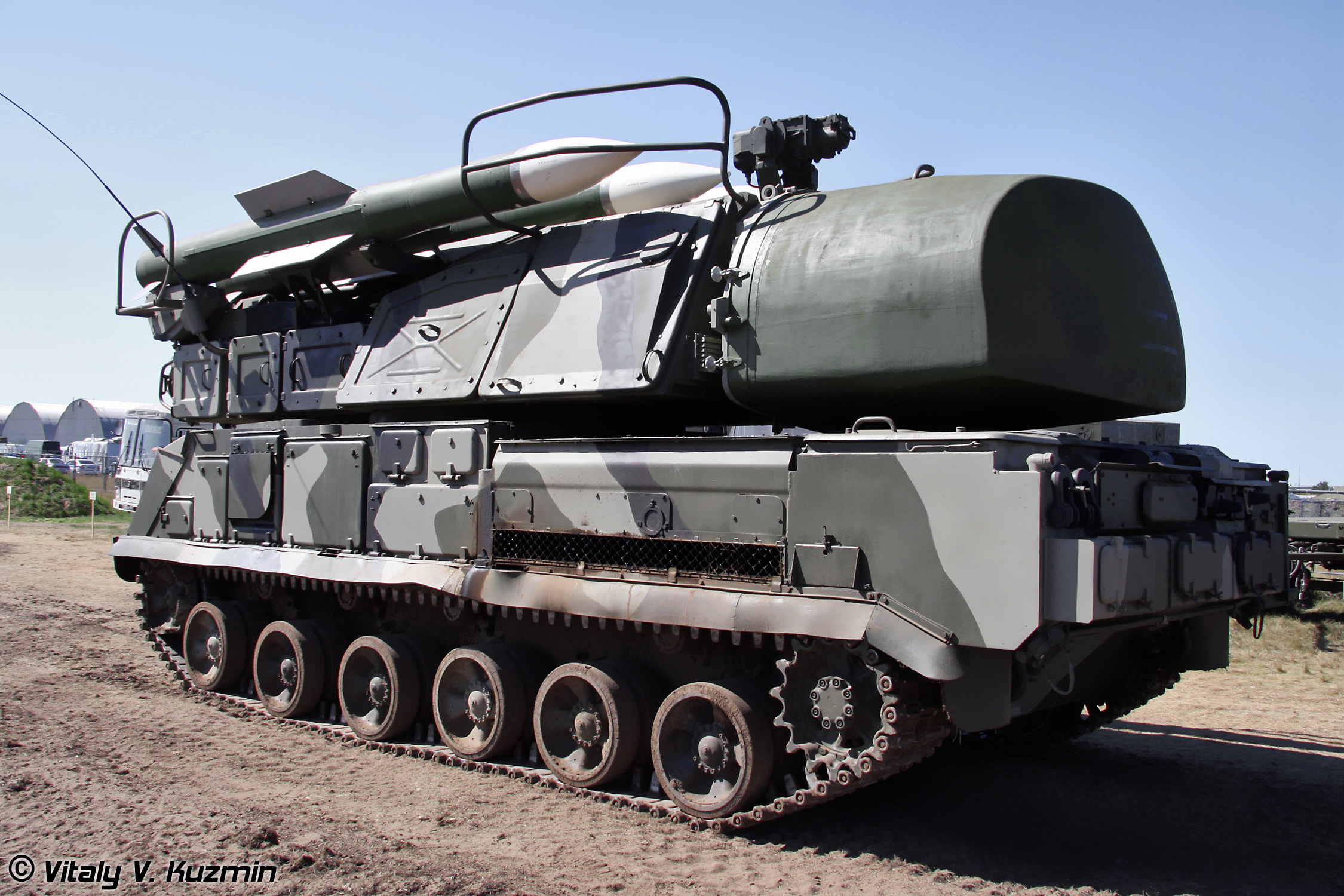
A Buk SAM of the type used by the 53rd Anti-Aircraft Missile Brigade

On 24 May 2018, after extensive comparative research, the JIT concluded that the Buk that shot down the flight came from the Russian 53rd Anti-Aircraft Missile Brigade in Kursk. The head of the National Investigation Service of the Dutch police asked the eyewitnesses and insiders to share information about the identities of the Buk crew members, the instruction the crew members followed and persons responsible for the operational deployment of the involved Buk on 17 July 2014. According to Dutch Public Prosecution Service, by 24 May 2018 "the authorities of the Russian Federation have ... not reported to the JIT that a Buk of the 53rd Brigade was deployed in Eastern Ukraine and that this Buk downed flight MH17." In response, Russian President Vladimir Putin stated that Russia would analyse the JIT conclusion, but would acknowledge it only if it became party to the investigation. The Russian Ministry of Defence in turn stated that no Russian Buk crossed the border with Ukraine.

On 25 May 2018, the governments of the Netherlands and Australia issued a joint statement in which they laid responsibility on Russia "for its part" in the crash. The Netherlands and Australian foreign ministers stated that they would hold Russia legally responsible for shooting the airliner down. Netherlands Foreign Minister Stef Blok stated that "the government is now taking the next step by formally holding Russia accountable," and, "The Netherlands and Australia today asked Russia to enter into talks aimed at finding a solution that would do justice to the tremendous suffering and damage caused by the downing of MH17. A possible next step is to present the case to an international court or organization for their judgment."

Several other countries and international organisations expressed their support for the JIT's conclusions and the joint statement by the Netherlands and Australia. UK Foreign Secretary Boris Johnson said the United Kingdom "fully supports Australia and the Netherlands," calling on Russia to cooperate. High Representative Federica Mogherini of the EU stated that the European Union "calls on the Russian Federation to accept its responsibility" and to cooperate as well. The German government called on Russia to "fully explain the tragedy." The US Department of State issued a statement saying that the United States "strongly support the decisions by the Netherlands and Australia," requesting Russia to acknowledge its involvement and to "cease its callous disinformation campaign." NATO Secretary General Jens Stoltenberg called on Russia to "accept responsibility and fully cooperate ... in line with United Nations Security Council Resolution 2166."

In response to the JIT's conclusions, Russian President Vladimir Putin reiterated that the Russians are "not involved in it." Following release of the JIT report, Malaysian Prime Minister Mahathir Mohamad said the JIT was making Russia a "scapegoat" and that he did not believe the Russians whom the JIT had charged were involved. Conversely the Malaysian prosecutor supported the investigation by saying the findings "are based on extensive investigations and also legal research".

==== Proposed international tribunal ====
In June 2015, the Netherlands, supported by the other JIT members, sought to create an international tribunal to prosecute those suspected of downing the Malaysian airliner, which would take up the case after the closing of the criminal investigation. The Dutch hoped that an international tribunal would induce Russian cooperation, which was considered critical. In late June 2015, the Russian government rejected a request by the five countries on the investigative committee to form a UN tribunal which would try those responsible for the shooting down of the aircraft, calling it "not timely and counterproductive." On 8 July 2015, Malaysia, a member of the UN Security Council, distributed a draft resolution to establish such a tribunal. This resolution was jointly proposed by the five JIT member countries. Russian UN Ambassador Vitaly Churkin responded, "I don't see any future for this resolution. Unfortunately, it seems that this is an attempt to organize a grandiose, political show, which only damages efforts to find the guilty parties." Russia later circulated a rival resolution which criticised the international investigation's lack of "due transparency" and demanded those responsible be brought to justice, but which did not call for a tribunal. In a vote, Malaysia's resolution gained majority support of the UNSC, but was vetoed by Russia.

==== Criminal prosecution ====
In a statement made on 5 July 2017 by the Dutch Minister of Foreign Affairs Bert Koenders, it was announced that the JIT countries would prosecute any suspects identified in the downing of flight MH17 in the Netherlands and under Dutch law. A treaty between the Netherlands and Ukraine made it possible for the Netherlands to prosecute in the cases of all 298 victims, regardless of their nationality. This treaty was signed on 7 July 2017, and went into force on 28 August 2018. On 21 March 2018, the Dutch government sent legislation to the parliament, allowing the suspects involved to be prosecuted in the Netherlands under Dutch law.

On 19 June 2019, the Dutch Public Prosecution Service charged four people with murder in connection with the shooting down of the aircraft: three Russians, Igor Girkin, Sergey Dubinsky, and Oleg Pulatov, and one Ukrainian, Leonid Kharchenko. International arrest warrants were issued in respect of each of the accused. One of the suspects, Lieutenant Colonel Oleg Pulatov, expressed his intention to join the legal process by being represented in court. Hearings in the trial began at the District Court of The Hague on 9 March 2020, with none of the accused in attendance. Igor Girkin gave an interview to journalist Graham Phillips saying he would not attend the trial because he did not recognise the court's jurisdiction over Russian citizens. He said that he was not involved in the shoot-down, and that he considered the government of Ukraine to be responsible for the loss of life, because "only a moron or a criminal would send an airliner into a zone of active hostilities".

In July 2019, SBU arrested Vladimir Tsemakh, head of air defence in DPR-controlled Snizhne during the attack on MH17. Bellingcat described him as an important eye-witness to the events surrounding the downing of flight MH17. Bellingcat analysed his possible role and said that a video showed Tsemakh making "what appears to be a damning admission to his personal involvement in hiding the Buk missile launcher in the aftermath of its use on 17 July 2014". In August 2019, Russia reportedly added Tsemakh to its list in a previously agreed exchange of prisoners of war with Ukraine. In an article, The Insider website commented on Russia's motives in requesting the exchange of a Ukrainian citizen. On 4 September 2019, an appeals court in Kyiv ruled to release Tsemakh. On 7 September 2019, Tsemakh was released during a Ukraine-Russia prisoner exchange. According to the Dutch Foreign Minister Stef Blok, the exchange had been delayed for a week so that Tsemakh could be questioned by the Dutch Public Prosecution Service as a witness about the events surrounding the downing of flight MH17. The Dutch Prime Minister Mark Rutte, the Minister of Justice and Security Ferd Grapperhaus, the JIT, and Blok added that the Netherlands regretted Tsemakh, who is a 'person of interest', being included in the exchange due to pressure on Ukraine from Russia. Piet Ploeg, Chairman of the victims' relatives organisation "Stichting Vliegramp MH17", called Tsemakh's release "unacceptable". The Dutch Public Prosecution Service (OM) requested that Tsemakh, who is not a Russian citizen, be extradited from Russia to the Netherlands. On 14 November 2019 the JIT published a new witnesses appeal and simultaneously released a number of recorded conversations of rebel leaders. JIT was particularly interested in "the command structure and the role that Russian government officials may have played."

A number of witness statements, especially from the DPR armed forces, were presented anonymously due to fear of reprisal from Russia. Although the Russian secret service attempted to hack into the Malaysian Attorney-General's office, investigation files of the Australian Federal Police and offices at The Hague, prosecutors say the identities of the witnesses still remained secure. The Dutch court, on considering defendant Oleg Pulatov's appeal against anonymous testimony, allowed twelve anonymous witness statements in the trial but barred the anonymous testimony of one witness.

On 7 June 2021, the trial moved on to the evidence phase, during which lawyers and judges discussed their findings. Witnesses were called in to supply additional information. On 21 December 2021, the Prosecution recommended life sentences for four suspects accused of downing the plane.

The trial reconvened on 7 March 2022, with the defence presenting oral arguments. On 17 November 2022, the court handed down life sentences to three defendants, Igor Girkin, Sergey Dubinskiy and Leonid Kharchenko for the murder of 298 passengers and crew. A fourth defendant, Oleg Pulatov, was acquitted on grounds of insufficient involvement in the incident. The presiding judge, Hendrik Steenhuis, said the court had concluded that MH17 was shot down by a Russian-made Buk missile launched from an agricultural field in eastern Ukraine, citing extensive evidence that did not leave "any possibility for reasonable doubt whatsoever" and that Russia had overall control of the separatist forces in eastern Ukraine when the plane was shot down.

The court concluded that the crew of the Buk Telar system had likely mistaken MH17 for a Ukrainian military aircraft. The court further concluded that although the Russian Federation exercised control over the separatist forces, the defendants in the trial did not have combatant status under international law since they were not part of the Russian Armed Forces.

==== European Court of Human Rights ====
On 10 July 2020, the Dutch government announced that it intended to take Russia to the European Court of Human Rights for "its role in the downing" of Flight MH17. By doing so, it said, it was "offering maximum support" to the individual cases already brought to the Court by the victims' families.

On 25 January 2023, the ECHR ruled that it could adjudicate the case against Russia because evidence had established that the separatist militias were "under the jurisdiction of the Russian Federation" and that Moscow "had a significant influence on the separatists' military strategy".

On 9 July 2025 the ECHR ruled that Russia was responsible for the downing of the plane and the deaths of everyone onboard. It further ruled that Russia had not performed any investigation, had not cooperated with the international investigation and had actively interfered with it, and it had not provided any legal remedy to the victims.

==== Convention on aviation legal action ====
On 14 March 2022, Australia and the Netherlands announced that they had launched a joint legal action against Russia under Article 84 of the Convention on International Civil Aviation. On 12 May 2025, the International Civil Aviation Organization (ICAO) council ruled that Russia was in breach of the Chicago convention and responsible for downing MH17.

== British ISC report ==
On 20 December 2017, the Intelligence and Security Committee of the UK Parliament published its annual report. It contains a section titled "Russian objectives and activity against UK and allied interests" which quotes MI6 as stating: "Russia conducts information warfare on a massive scale... An early example of this was a hugely intensive, multichannel propaganda effort to persuade the world that Russia bore no responsibility for the shooting down of [Malaysian Airlines flight] MH-17 (an outright falsehood: we know beyond any reasonable doubt that the Russian military supplied and subsequently recovered the missile launcher)".

== Identification of command figures ==
In December 2017, the Russian investigative portal The Insider, the news agency McClatchyDC, and Bellingcat, following a joint investigation, confirmed the identity of a high-ranking military officer using a call-sign "Dolphin" to be Colonel General Nikolai Fedorovich Tkachev. Tkachev is heard supervising the operation of Buk delivery and set-up in wiretaps acquired by JIT. In April 2020 the same three teams identified another high-ranking figure in the chain of command referred to by many DPR and LPR operatives as "Vladimir Ivanovich" to be FSB Colonel General Andrey Ivanovich Burlaka, first deputy chief of the Russian border service.

== Civil cases ==
In July 2015, a writ was filed in an American court by families of 18 victims accusing the separatist leader Igor Girkin of "orchestrating the shootdown" and the Russian government of being complicit in the act. The writ was brought under the Torture Victim Protection Act of 1991. In May 2016 families of 33 victims of the crash filed a claim against Russia and president Vladimir Putin in the European Court of Human Rights, arguing Russian actions violated the passengers' right to life. A group of 270 relatives of Dutch victims joined the claim in May 2018 after the JIT concluded that Russia was involved. The Dutch government supported this claim by taking Russia to the European Court of Human Rights in July 2020, assuming that Moscow had "effective control" of the area of Ukraine where the missile was launched. In January 2023, the Grand Chamber of the European Court of Human Rights found that the "areas in eastern Ukraine in separatist hands were, from 11 May 2014 and up to at least 26 January 2022, under the jurisdiction of the Russian Federation", pointing to the presence in eastern Ukraine of Russian military personnel and regular Russian troops.

In July 2016, Malaysia Airlines was sued in Malaysia by 15 passengers' families in two separate writs, each brought under the Montreal Convention, arguing that the airline should not have chosen that route. A month earlier, a separate lawsuit was brought by the families of six crew members who alleged negligence and breach of contract by the airline.

== Reactions ==
=== Countries ===
Ukrainian President Petro Poroshenko called the crash the result of an act of terrorism, and also called for an international investigation into the crash.

Malaysian Deputy Foreign Minister Hamzah Zainuddin said that the foreign ministry would be working with the Russian and Ukrainian governments with regard to the incident. Prime Minister Najib Razak said that Malaysia was unable yet to verify the cause of the crash but that, if the airliner was shot down, the perpetrators should be swiftly punished. The Malaysian government flew the national flag at half-mast from 18 July until 21 July.

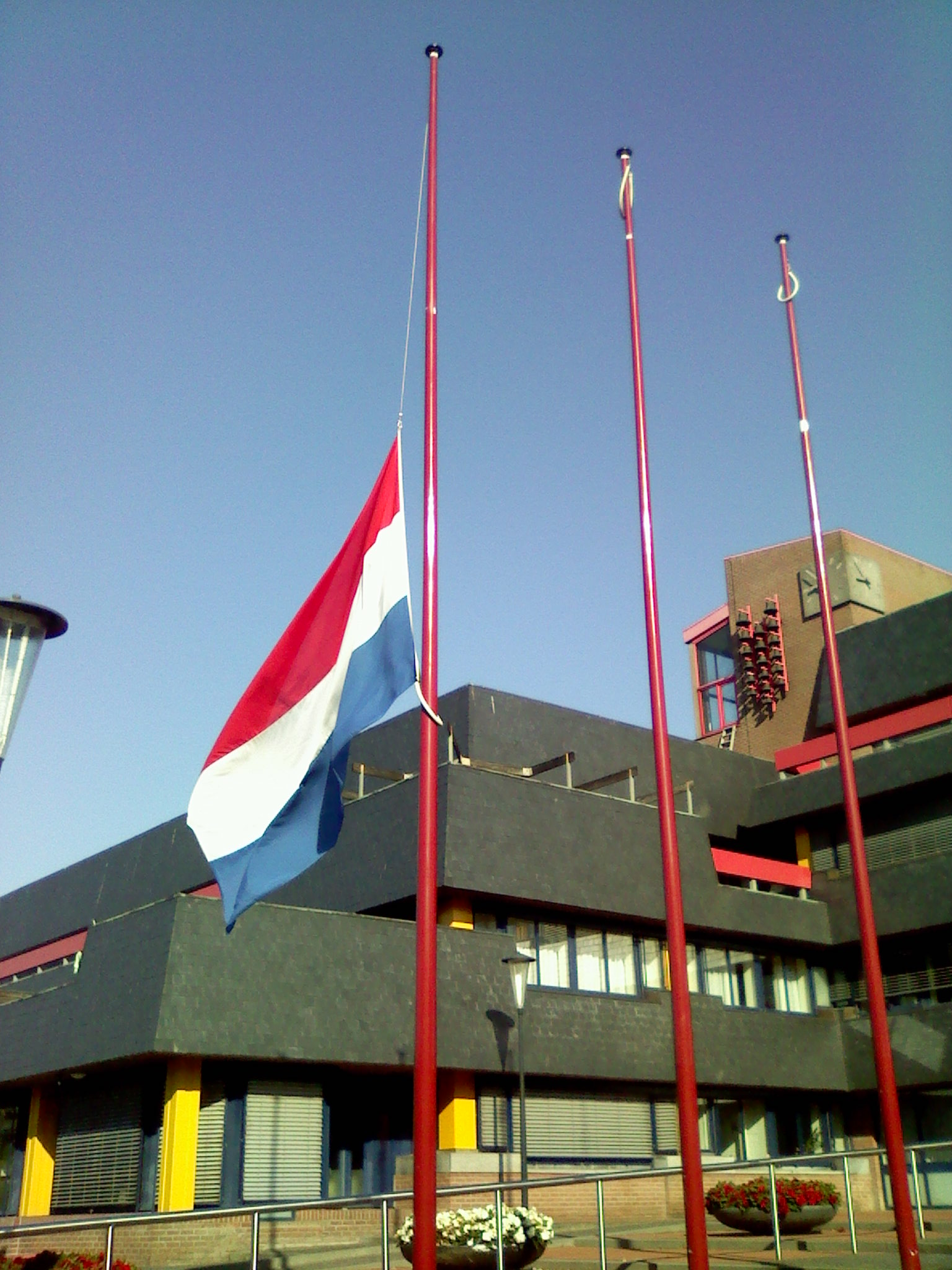
Dutch flag at half mast in front of Hoorn city hall during the national day of mourning on 23 July 2014

Dutch Prime Minister Mark Rutte and King Willem-Alexander voiced their shock at the crash, and Minister of Foreign Affairs Frans Timmermans joined the Dutch investigation team sent to Ukraine. Dutch government buildings flew the flag at half-mast on 18 July. Music was cancelled and festivities were toned down on the last day of the Nijmegen Marches. On 21 July the Netherlands opened a war crimes investigation on the downing of the aircraft and a Netherlands public prosecutor went to Ukraine as part of this investigation. Rutte threatened tough action against Russia if it did not help in the investigation. On the same day, Timmermans spoke at the UN Security Council Meeting, after the council had unanimously condemned the shooting down of MH17. An increase in negative emotions and somatic complaints was observed in the Dutch population during the first four days after the MH17 crash. Russell Shorto of Time wrote that due to the small size of the Netherlands, "everyone is within a couple of degrees of separation of everyone else". Shorto noted: "the proportionate loss of life for a country the size of the United States would be about 6,000 people".

Russian President Vladimir Putin said that Ukraine bore responsibility for the incident which happened in its territory, which he said would not have happened if hostilities had not resumed in the south-east of Ukraine. At the end of July, State Duma deputy Ilya Ponomarev said in an interview for Die Welt that the separatists had shot down the airliner by mistake and that Putin now realised he had supplied the weapon to the "wrong people". The Danish Institute for International Studies pointed to the similarities of the reaction to the downing of Korean Airlines flight KAL-007 in 1983 where the USSR initially denied any involvement.

Australian Prime Minister Tony Abbott said in an address to parliament that the aircraft was downed by a missile which seemed to have been launched by Russian-backed rebels. Julie Bishop, the Australian Minister for Foreign Affairs, said in an interview on Australian television that it was "extraordinary" that her Russian counterparts had refused to discuss the downing of MH17 when the Russian ambassador was summoned to meet her. The Russian government was critical of Abbott's response; Abbott was one of the first world leaders to publicly connect the shoot-down to Russia. Abbott later criticised the recovery efforts as "shambolic", and "more like a garden clean-up than a forensic investigation"; Bishop publicly warned separatist forces against treating the victims' bodies as hostages. Abbott also said in an interview on 13 October 2014, in anticipation of Russia's President Vladimir Putin's attendance at the 2014 G20 summit, scheduled for mid-November 2014 in Brisbane, Australia: "Australians were murdered. They were murdered by Russian-backed rebels using Russian-supplied equipment. We are very unhappy about this." In 2024, the documentary television series Nemesis revealed that Abbott considered deploying Australian troops to the crash site.

United States President Barack Obama said the United States would help determine the cause. In a press statement, White House spokesman Josh Earnest called for an immediate ceasefire in Ukraine to allow for a full investigation. Vice-president Joe Biden said the aircraft appeared to have been deliberately shot down, and offered American assistance for the investigation into the crash. American Ambassador to the United Nations Samantha Power called on Russia to end the war. The British government requested an emergency meeting of the United Nations Security Council and called an emergency Cobra meeting after the incident. Chairman of the US Joint Chiefs of Staff Martin E. Dempsey said that instead of backing away from supporting the rebels following the shooting down, Putin had "taken a decision to escalate."

=== Organisations ===
On 17 July, the European Union's representatives José Manuel Barroso and Herman Van Rompuy released a joint statement calling for an immediate and thorough investigation. The EU officials also said that Ukraine has first claim on the aircraft's black boxes.

The International Civil Aviation Organization announced, on 18 July, that it was sending its team of experts to assist the National Bureau of Air Accidents Investigation of Ukraine (NBAAI), under Article 26 of the Convention on International Civil Aviation. The United Nations Security Council adopted Resolution 2166 on 21 July, regarding an official crime investigation into the incident. On 24 July 2014 the ICAO issued a State Letter reminding signatory states of their responsibilities with respect to the safety and security of civil aircraft operating in airspace affected by conflict.

=== Memorials ===
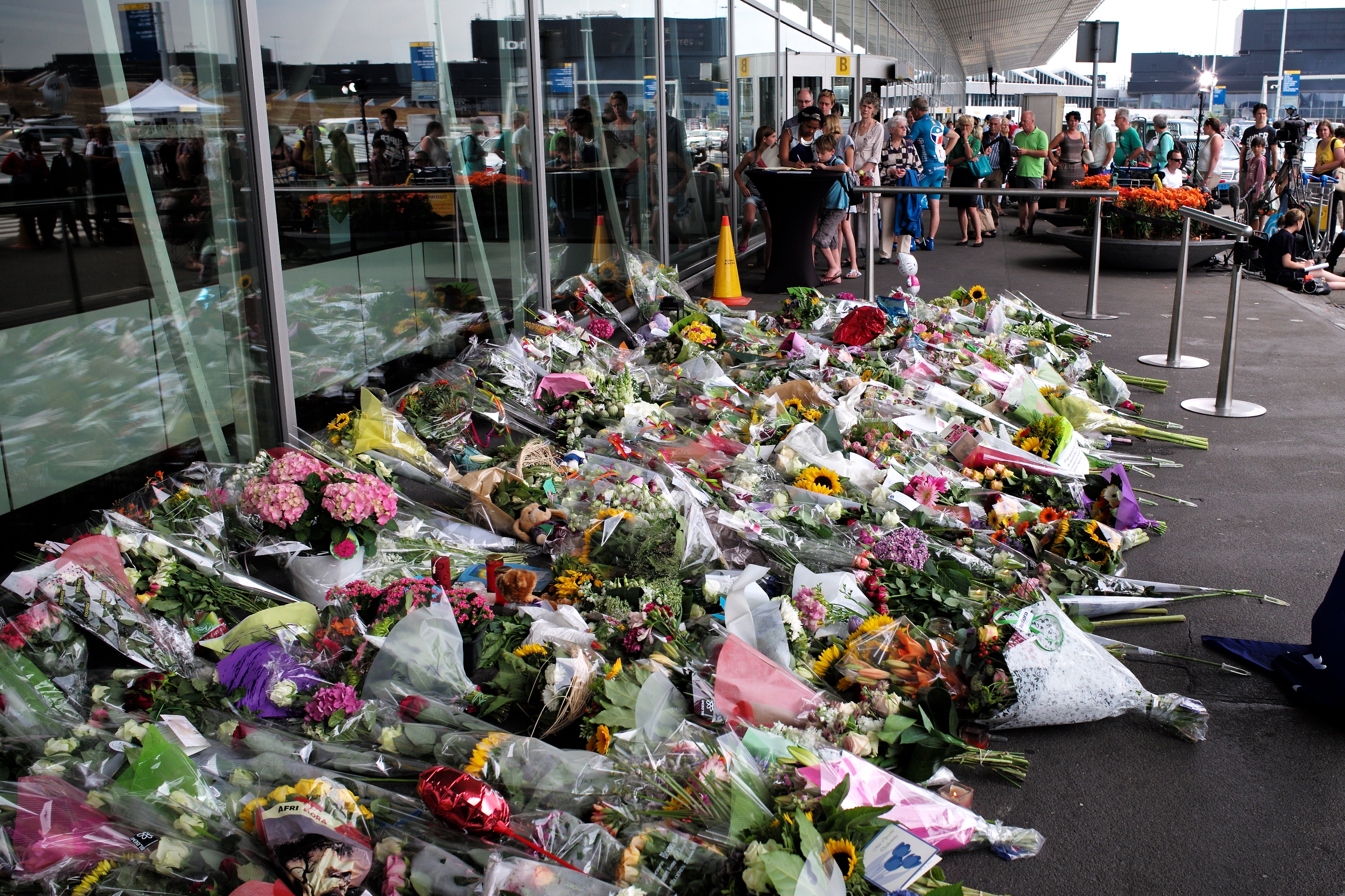
A makeshift memorial at Schiphol Airport for the victims of Flight MH17

After the crash, memorial services were held in Australia and in the Netherlands, which declared 23 July – the day when the first victims arrived in the country – a national day of mourning, the first in the country since the assassination of U.S. President John F. Kennedy in 1963, and the first to commemorate any Dutch person since Queen Wilhelmina during her funeral in 1962. The opening ceremony of the AIDS 2014 conference, on 20 July, of which several delegates had been on board Flight MH17, began with a tribute to the victims of the crash. In Malaysia, makeshift memorials were created in the capital city of Kuala Lumpur.

Amongst the victims of flight MH17 were supporters of Newcastle United Football Club John Alder (63) and Liam Sweeney (28) who were travelling to watch the club play a match in New Zealand. Newcastle United FC paid tribute to them with the club's then-manager, Alan Pardew saying; "Sometimes when you lose lives in that manner, it puts into context what we do. This season we want to give their families something to remember them by, by having a successful season." In 2014 Newcastle United installed the Alder Sweeney Memorial Garden outside their St James' Park stadium in memory of Alder, Sweeney and all those killed on Flight MH17.

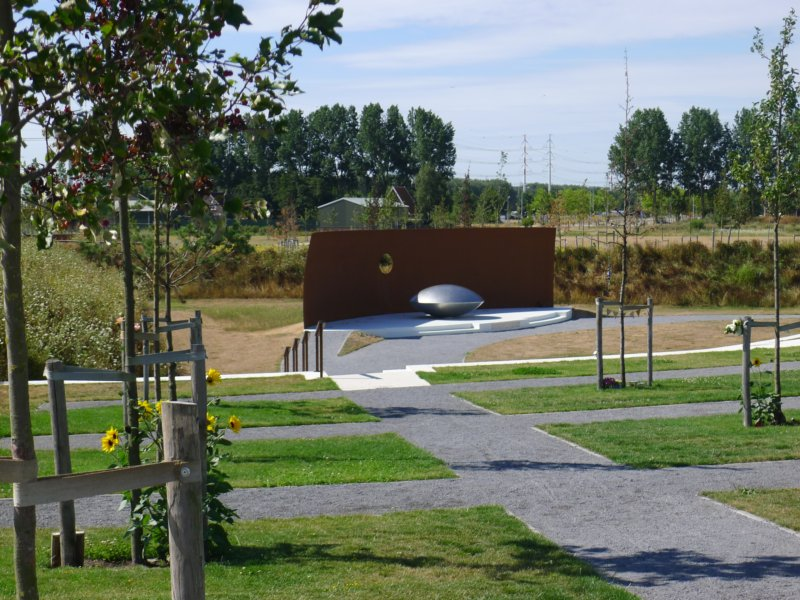
Memorial for the victims of Flight MH17 that was unveiled in 2017 in Vijfhuizen, the Netherlands, near Schiphol Airport

Multiple memorials appeared across the Netherlands. On 17 July 2017, exactly three years after the crash, a memorial in memory of the victims was unveiled in Vijfhuizen, the Netherlands. The opening of the memorial, which is just outside Schiphol Airport, was attended by more than 2000 relatives of victims, King Willem-Alexander and his wife Queen Máxima, Dutch Prime Minister Mark Rutte, Minister of Security and Justice Stef Blok and the speakers of the Dutch Senate and House of Representatives. The memorial includes 298 trees, one tree for each victim.

On 17 July 2015, a year after the crash, sunflower seeds taken from a field near the crash site were grown in tribute to the 15 residents of Hilversum, including three families, who were killed. Amid the ongoing war, Fairfax chief correspondent Paul McGeough and photographer Kate Geraghty collected a keepsake of sunflower seeds from the wreck site for family and friends of the 38 Australian victims, which happened to be viable and had therefore germinated.

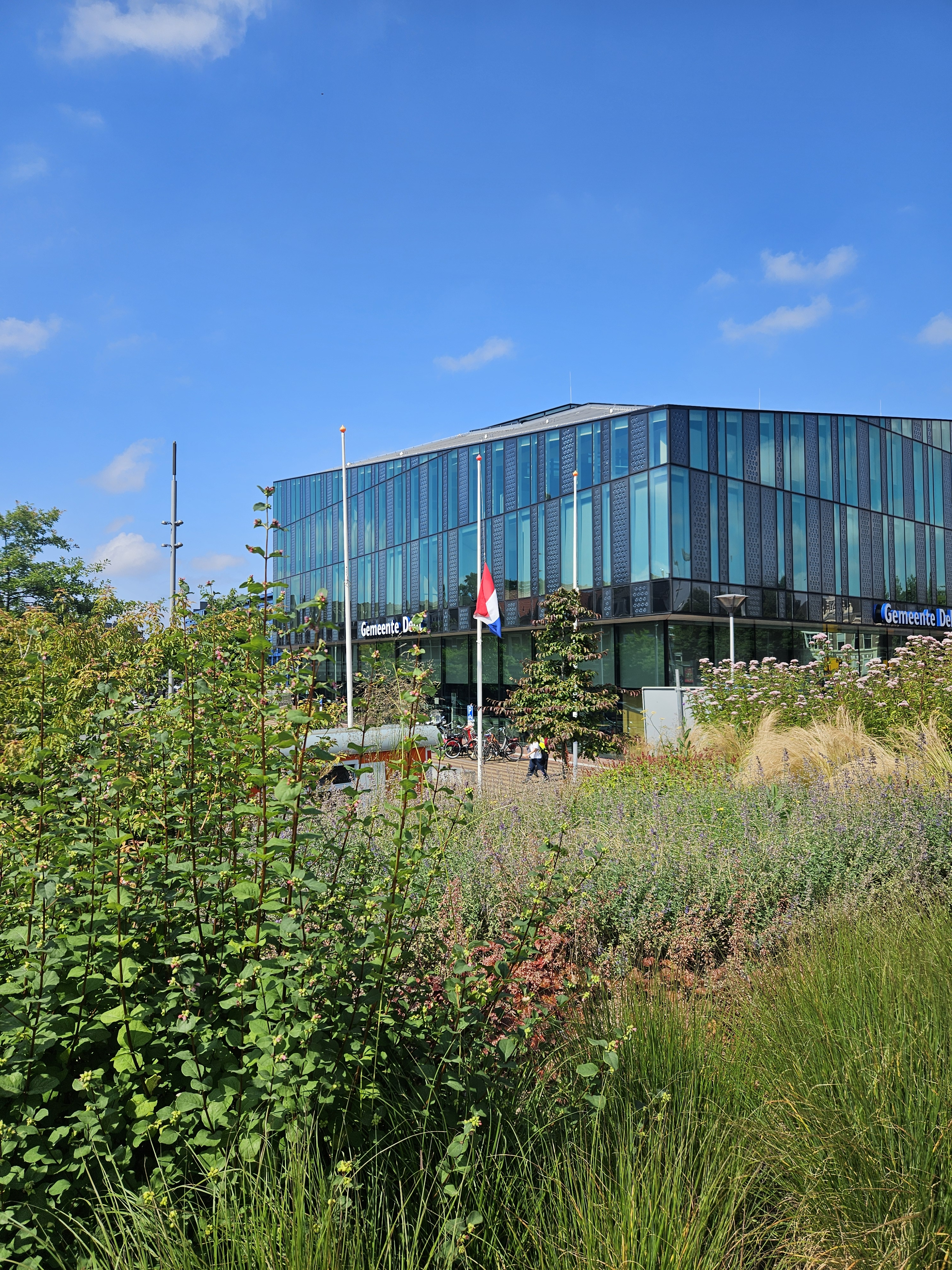
The Dutch national flag at half mast at the Delft municipal offices in 2024 to mark 10 years since the downing of MH17

The tenth anniversary of the crash was commemorated at the National Monument MH17. Prime Minister Dick Schoof delivered a speech. Both he and King Willem-Alexander spoke with the victims' relatives. About 1,300 relatives attended, along with officials from various countries. The ceremony included reading the names of all 298 victims and observing two minutes of silence.

== Russian media coverage ==
Coverage by the Russian media has differed from coverage in most other countries and has changed significantly over time. According to Bellingcat, these changes have usually been in response to new evidence published by DSB and the investigation team. According to a poll conducted by the Levada Center between 18 and 24 July 2014, 80% of Russians surveyed believed that the crash of MH17 was caused by the Ukrainian military. Only 3% of respondents blamed the disaster on the pro-Russian separatists in eastern Ukraine. Researchers said views were influenced by the televisual infosphere. In the three days following the incident, the Russian Internet Research Agency "troll farm" posted 111,486 tweets from fake accounts. Mostly posted in Russian, the tweets initially said the rebels had shot down a Ukrainian aircraft, but quickly changed to accusing Ukraine of carrying out the attack. This is both the largest number of tweets in any 24 hour period, and for any topic in the history of the Internet Research Agency (IRA).

Conversely, the liberal Russian opposition newspaper Novaya Gazeta shortly after the crash published a headline in Dutch that read "Vergeef ons, Nederland" ("Forgive Us, Netherlands").

In July 2014, Sara Firth, who had worked as a correspondent with RT for the previous five years, resigned in protest at the channel's coverage of the crash, which she described as "lies".

=== Initial reactions ===
On the evening of the crash, the LifeNews portal reported that at around 16:00 local time the separatists shot down "Ukrainian Air Force An-26 transport plane" with a missile, calling it "a new victory for the Donetsk militia". The news was immediately picked up and disseminated by many other news websites and the Russia-24 TV channel. Around the same time Leonid Kharchenko, who was responsible for the Buk launcher convoy through DPR, reported to his commander Sergei Dubinsky that the launcher is "on the spot and has already downed one" Ukrainian ground-attack aircraft.

Shortly after it became evident that it was a civilian aircraft which had been shot down, the separatist media denied any responsibility and denied having anti-aircraft missiles capable of reaching the cruising altitude of commercial traffic.

=== Claims of shoot-down by the Ukrainian Air Force ===
For the first year following the crash, Russian state media claimed that a Ukrainian Air Force Su-25 jet had shot down Flight 17. Radar data, allegedly from Russian air traffic controllers, which was leaked to a Moscow newspaper, was claimed to be proof that there were Ukrainian military jets near MH17. Russia claimed that a Ukrainian Air Force deserter had told them that he had overheard Ukrainian pilots discussing having shot down the wrong plane on the day MH17 crashed.

On 15 November 2014, Russia's Channel One reported a supposedly leaked spy satellite photo which showed the airliner being shot from behind by a Ukrainian Su-25 fighter jet. Many other Russian media reprinted the photo which was immediately dismissed as crudely inauthentic. Among other inconsistencies, both aircraft were massive relative to the terrain below, indicating that it was a crude copy-and-paste job. Later it was disclosed that the photo had been initially emailed to the vice-president of the Russian Union of Engineers by a self-described aviation expert who had found it on a Russian online forum. The aviation expert later apologised, saying that he was unhappy with how the information had been used. In a 2019 interview in The New Yorker magazine, Channel One CEO Konstantin Ernst said that reporting on the satellite photo had been a human mistake, not done on purpose.

On 25 December 2014, Russia's state-operated domestic news agency RIA Novosti quoted the leader of the self-proclaimed Donetsk People's Republic, Alexander Zakharchenko, saying he saw MH17 shot out of the sky by two Ukrainian jets.

The claim that the Su-25 downed the Boeing was part of a strategic narrative that "Ukraine is responsible" and it used altered data as its key deception mechanism. As soon as evidence that a surface-to-air missile and not an air-to-air missile was used to down the Boeing, the Su-25 narrative was changed to one in which MH17 was shot down by a Buk launcher operated by the Ukrainian military.

==== Debunking ====
The Sukhoi Su-25 is a ground attack aircraft and it is not designed to destroy aircraft. The claim that the Su-25 could have downed the Boeing 777 with an air-to-air missile was studied and dismissed by the Joint-investigation team (JIT), Public Prosecution Service and numerous independent experts, including chief designer of the Su-25, Vladimir Babak.

Public prosecutors concluded that the claim was false. The only air-to-air missiles able to shoot down MH17 were either R-33 or R-37, or R-40 missiles and a Su-25 could not carry any of these missiles. Vladimir Babak also said that the Su-25 is slower than a Boeing 777, and the Su-25's maximum altitude was 7 kilometres (4.3 mi), while MH17 was flying at an altitude of 10 kilometres (6.2 mi). Siemon T. Wezeman, a senior researcher from Stockholm International Peace Research Institute (SIPRI), and the Popular Science digital magazine also said that it would be technically impossible for a Su-25 to down such a plane. Aviation engineer Mark Solonin said that the Su-25 does not have an onboard radar and its missiles could not inflict damage similar to that found on Flight 17. Military and security analyst Lukáš Visingr also said that the Su-25 could not shoot down a Boeing 777.

A subsequent presentation of radar data in 2016 by the Russian military no longer showed military aircraft present in the area.

In March 2022, during the Russian invasion of Ukraine, the Russian Embassy in France again falsely blamed the Ukrainian military for the shootdown.

=== Claims of shoot-down by a Ukrainian Buk ===
In May 2015, Novaya Gazeta published a report credited to a group of Russian military engineers. Based on their analysis of debris and damage patterns on the hull of the aircraft, they concluded that the airliner was shot down by a Buk-M1 launcher with a 9M38M1 missile. They claimed that the missile could not have been fired from Snizhne, but was instead fired from Zaroshchenske and that a Ukrainian anti-air unit was located there at that time. In June 2015, the report was the subject of a press conference and was attributed to Mikhail Malisevskiy, chief engineer at Moscow-headquartered Almaz-Antey, the Buk missile manufacturer. The Security Service of Ukraine said that there were inaccuracies in this version, and called part of the report a fake. Ukrainska Pravda questioned claims about the Ukrainian anti-aircraft unit and stated that Zaroshchenske was under control of pro-Russian forces on the day of the shoot-down. Novaya Gazeta published an analysis, also denying the Almaz-Antey version, which contained interviews with inhabitants of Zaroshchenske who denied claims that Ukrainian forces and Buk launchers were present in the village at that time. According to Bellingcat, Russia's satellite images were from June and showed signs of editing.

On 17 September 2018, Russia's Ministry of Defence held a press conference at which Lt. Gen. Nikolai Parshin, chief of the Missile and Artillery Directorate, said that after Dutch investigators displayed parts of the missile and their serial numbers, they had studied and declassified archives at the research centre that produced the Buk missiles. Parshin said the Russian archives showed that the missile that was made from these parts was transported to a military unit in western Ukraine in 1986, and to Russia's knowledge never left Ukraine. Officials also claimed that video evidence presented by the Joint Investigation Team (JIT), in which the missile that allegedly shot down the airliner was shown being moved from Russia into Ukraine, was fabricated.

JIT responded that it had requested details about recovered missile parts from Russia in May 2018, but had received no answer. It said, information from the Russian Ministry of Defence would be carefully studied as soon as the documents were made available, as requested in May 2018 and required by UNSC in 2016. JIT stated it had always carefully analysed information provided by Russia, but information presented to the public was inaccurate on several points. Russia had given differing accounts over time of how MH17 was shot down; for example claiming to have evidence (radar images) that a Ukrainian fighter fired an air-to-air missile at MH17.

=== Conspiracy theories ===
On 18 July, Igor Girkin, the commander of the Donbas People's Militia, was quoted as stating that "a significant number of the bodies weren't fresh". He followed up by saying "Ukrainian authorities are capable of any baseness"; and also claimed that blood serum and medications were found in the wreckage in large quantities. Girkin also claimed that some of the passengers had died a few days before the crash.

According to the Russian military, in what New York magazine called "Russia's Conspiracy Theory", MH17 was shot down by the Ukrainians, using either a surface-to-air missile or a fighter aircraft. On 21 July 2014, the Russian Ministry of Defence (MoD) held a press conference and claimed that satellite photographs showed that the Ukrainian army moved a Buk SAM battery to the area close to the territory controlled by the rebels on the morning of 17 July, hours before the crash. They said the installation was moved away again by 18 July. The Russian MoD also claimed that they had detected a Ukrainian airforce Su-25 and that this ground-attack aircraft approached to within three to five kilometres (2 to 3 mi) of the Malaysian airliner wreckage. In 2015 Bellingcat purchased satellite photos from the same area and time as used by the MoD and demonstrated that the MoD had used older photos (May and June 2014) in their presentation, and that the presentation had been edited to make a Ukrainian Buk launcher appear as if it had been removed after the attack. In the report published by the Dutch Safety Board, an air-to-air missile strike was ruled out.

The Russian government-funded TV network RT initially said that the airliner may have been shot down by Ukraine in a failed attempt to assassinate Vladimir Putin, in a plot which was organised by Ukraine's "Western backers". This was quickly dismissed as Putin's flight route was hundreds of kilometres north of Ukraine.

Other conspiracy theories propagated by Russian pro-government media included claims that the Ukrainians had shot down the airliner by mistake, drawing parallels to the downing of Siberia Airlines Flight 1812 in 2001 (reported in December 2014); that Ukrainian air traffic controllers had deliberately redirected the flight to fly over the war zone; and that the Ukrainian government had organised the attack to discredit the pro-Russian rebels. The number of alternative theories disseminated in Russian mass media started growing as the DSB and JIT investigations increasingly pointed towards the separatists.

In 2017, Dutch newspaper NRC described how false stories about the MH17 crash had been propagated with the support of Christian Democratic Appeal politician Pieter Omtzigt, who introduced a Russian-speaking Ukrainian man as an "eyewitness" to the crash on a public expert debate in May 2017. The man, who was an asylum-seeker from Ukraine, did not witness the crash and his speech, texted to him by Omtzigt prior to the interview, repeated the Russian-promoted version that Ukrainian jets downed the Boeing.

== Maps ==
Location of departure, crash site and destination
Location of departure and crash site

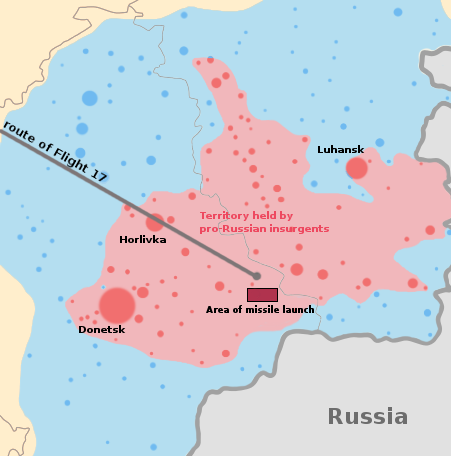
Presumed route ending in an area controlled by pro-Russian rebels according to The New York Times (Note: "A United States official said the missile that shot down the plane was launched from a region near the towns of Torez and Snizhne" See also several mentions of one or both of these towns in the Cause of crash section and elsewhere in this article)

== In popular culture ==
The shootdown of MH17 is featured in the fourth episode of eighteenth season of the Canadian documentary television programme Mayday, in the episode titled "Deadly Airspace". It is also a major event in Maryna Er Gorbach's film Klondike.

== See also ==
- List of deadliest aircraft accidents and incidents
- List of airliner shootdown incidents
