= Russian Union of Engineers =

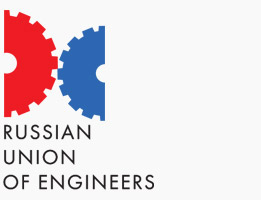
- Trade name: RUE
- Company type: all-Russian organization
- Industry: Professional services
- Headquarters: Russia: Moscow
- Area served: All-Russian
- Key people: Nikolay Koryagin, Ivan Andriyevsky, Konstantin Kovalyov
- Website: rusue.ru

The Russian Union of Engineers (RUE) (Russian: Российский союз инженеров (РСИ)) claims to be an all-Russian nongovernmental organization of engineers, design-engineers, builders, inventors, rationalizers, researchers, scientists, scientific and technical employees, and managers of industrial production. It has published several studies on economics, energy and housing related subjects and a paper on Malaysia Airlines Flight 17.

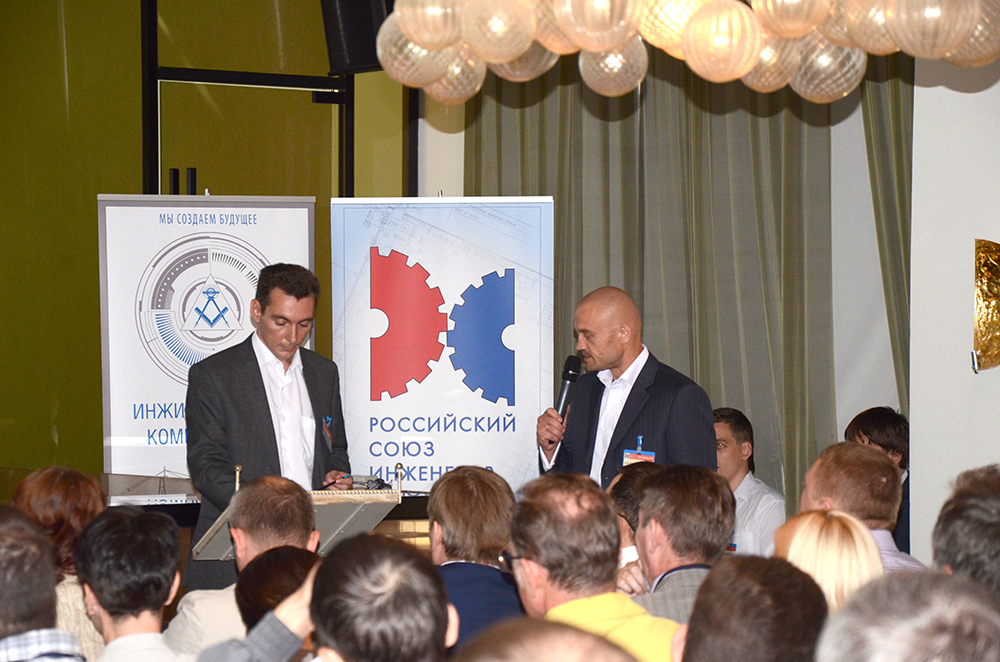
Representatives of Engineering Company "2К" take part in the discussion on the seminar

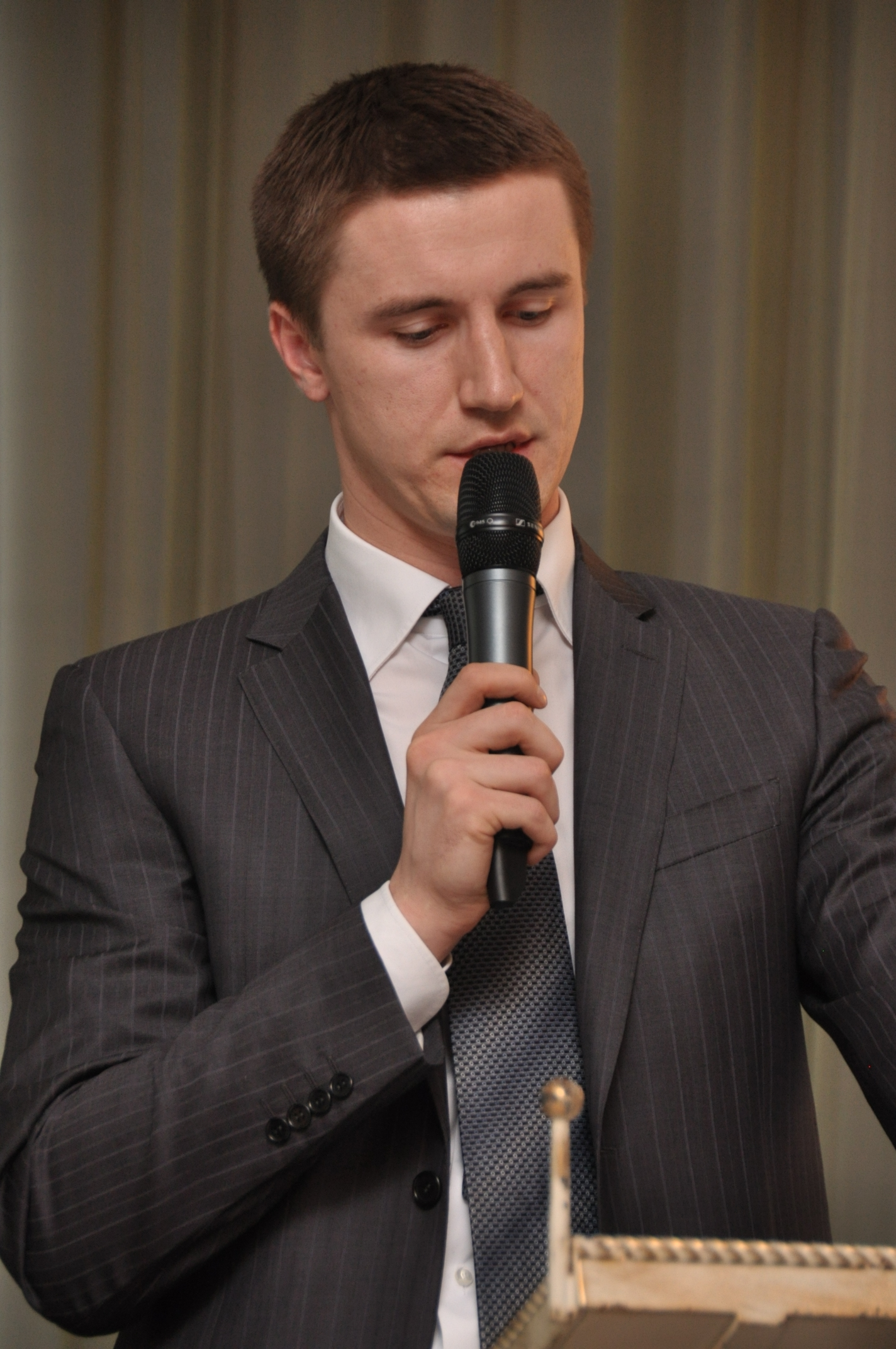
Representative of the Vnesheconombank takes part in the discussion on the seminar

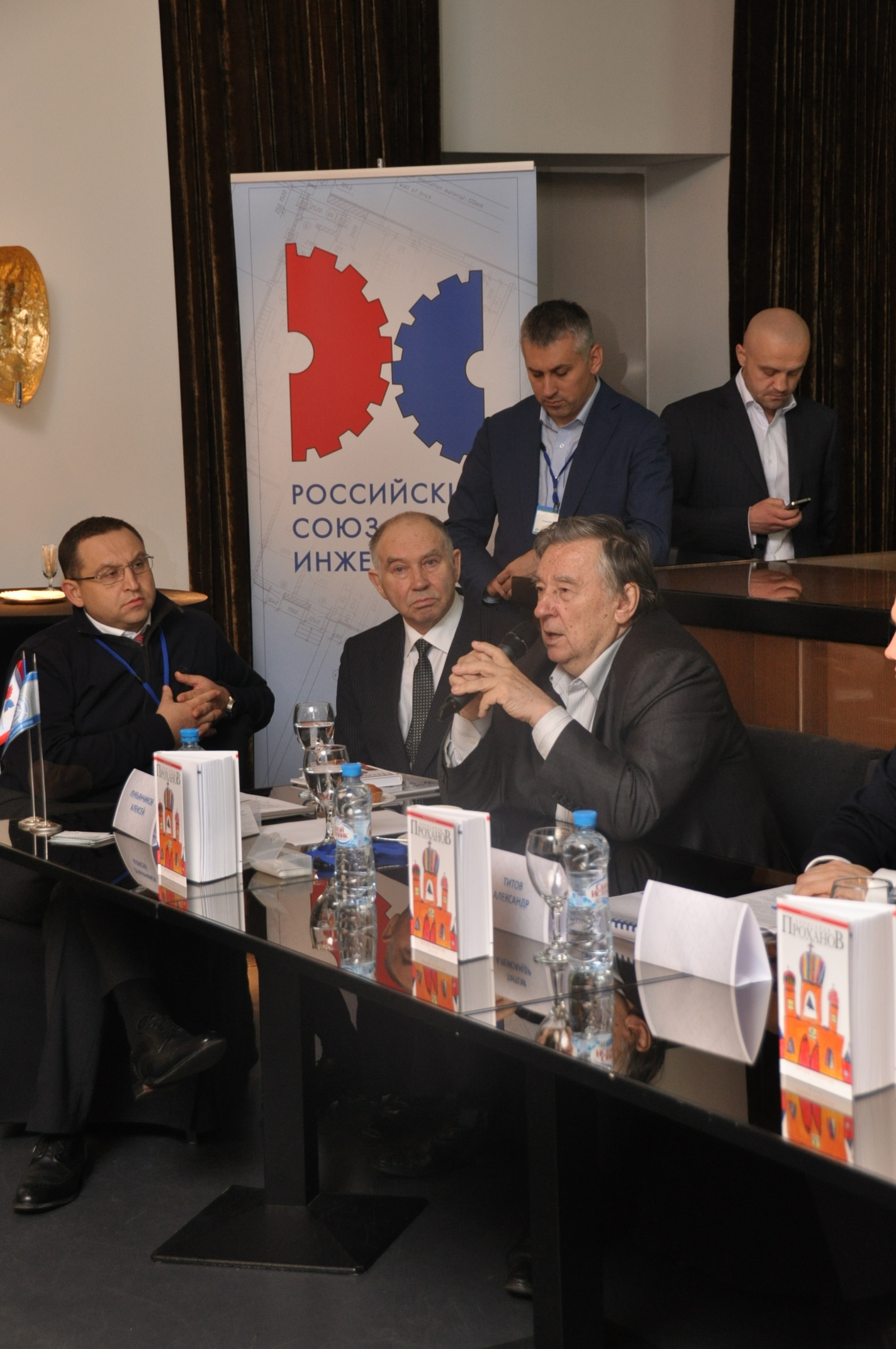
Alexander Andreyevich Prokhanov takes part in the discussion on the seminar

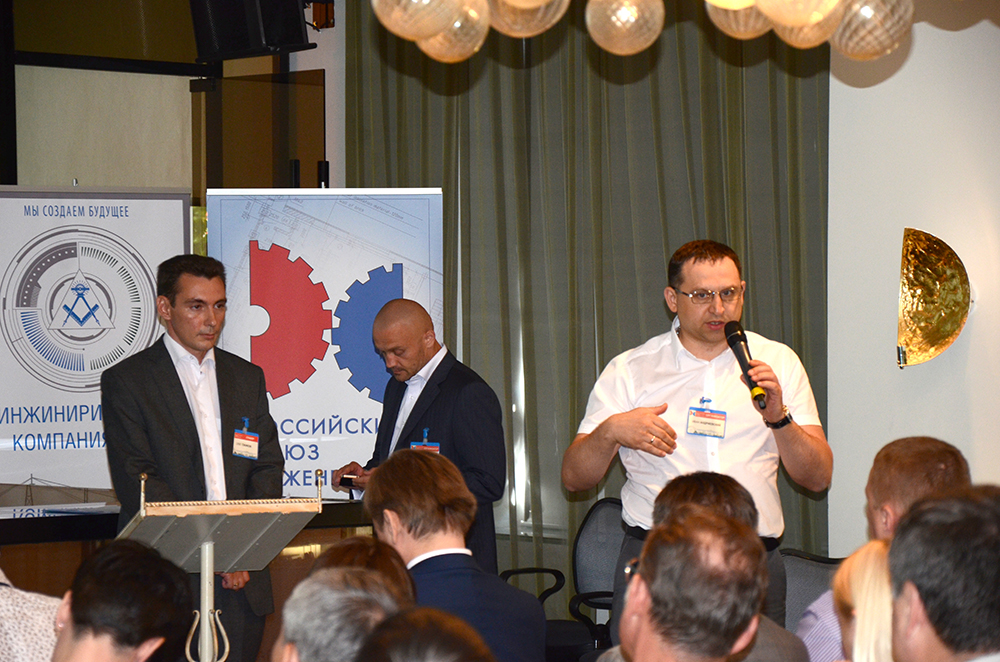
Representatives of Engineering Company "2К" takes part in the discussion on the seminar

== Social projects ==
On January 21, 2012, at the Polytechnical Museum of Moscow, the Russian Union of Engineers presented the general rating of city appeal of Russian cities for 2011.

On May 20, 2013, the Ministry of Regional Development of the Russian Federation, the Federal Agency of Construction and Housing of the Russian Federation, Russian Union of Engineers and the experts of Lomonosov Moscow State University developed a rating and methodology of evaluation of urban environment and analyzed the 50 largest Russian cities. For this work, the Union designed the methods of urban environment quality assessment and a city appeal threshold.

The rating has been developed:

- by the order the President of the Russian Federation defined in paragraph 1 of Assignments No. Pr-534 of the President of the Russian Federation as of February 29, 2012, to executive bodies as a result of the meeting “On measures of implementation of the housing policy” as of February 14, 2012
- by the order of the Chairman of the Government of the Russian Federation defined in paragraph 4 of the List of assignments № VP-P9-1581 “On development of a methodology of assessment of urban environment quality and assessment of the major cities of Russia” of the Chairman of the Government of the Russian Federation as March 20, 2012.

== See also ==
- Science and technology in Russia

== Links to sources ==
- Official website of the Russian Union of Engineers
- Leaders of the Russian Union of Engineers
- Contacts of the Russian Union of Engineers
- Report on activities of the Russian Union of Engineers, Russia 1 channel
- Presentation of the General Rating of Russian Cities, Plekhanov Club
- Democracy in a Technological Society, Langdon Winner, 1992
- The Russian Union of Engineers: The proposal to reduce the tax burden on oil from 55 to 45% - is fully justified
- Russian Union of Engineers came to the conclusion that the Lipetsk almost unfit for life
- The Russian Union of Engineers supports reducing the tax burden on the oil industry
- Novokuznechane leave the city because of the local authorities?
- Russian Union of Engineers presented rating appeal of Russian cities
- The Russian Union of Engineers: Chita characterized by depressive state
- "Russian Union of Engineers': the emergence of the Russian electric prematurely
- After the accident at the Baikonur Cosmodrome launch vehicle "Proton-M" in the "Russian Union of Engineers' expressed the need for the expansion of the Institute of the military office
- The Russian Union of Engineers supports the desire of the authorities to strengthen state control over pricing in the housing sector
