= National Bureau of Air Accidents Investigation of Ukraine =

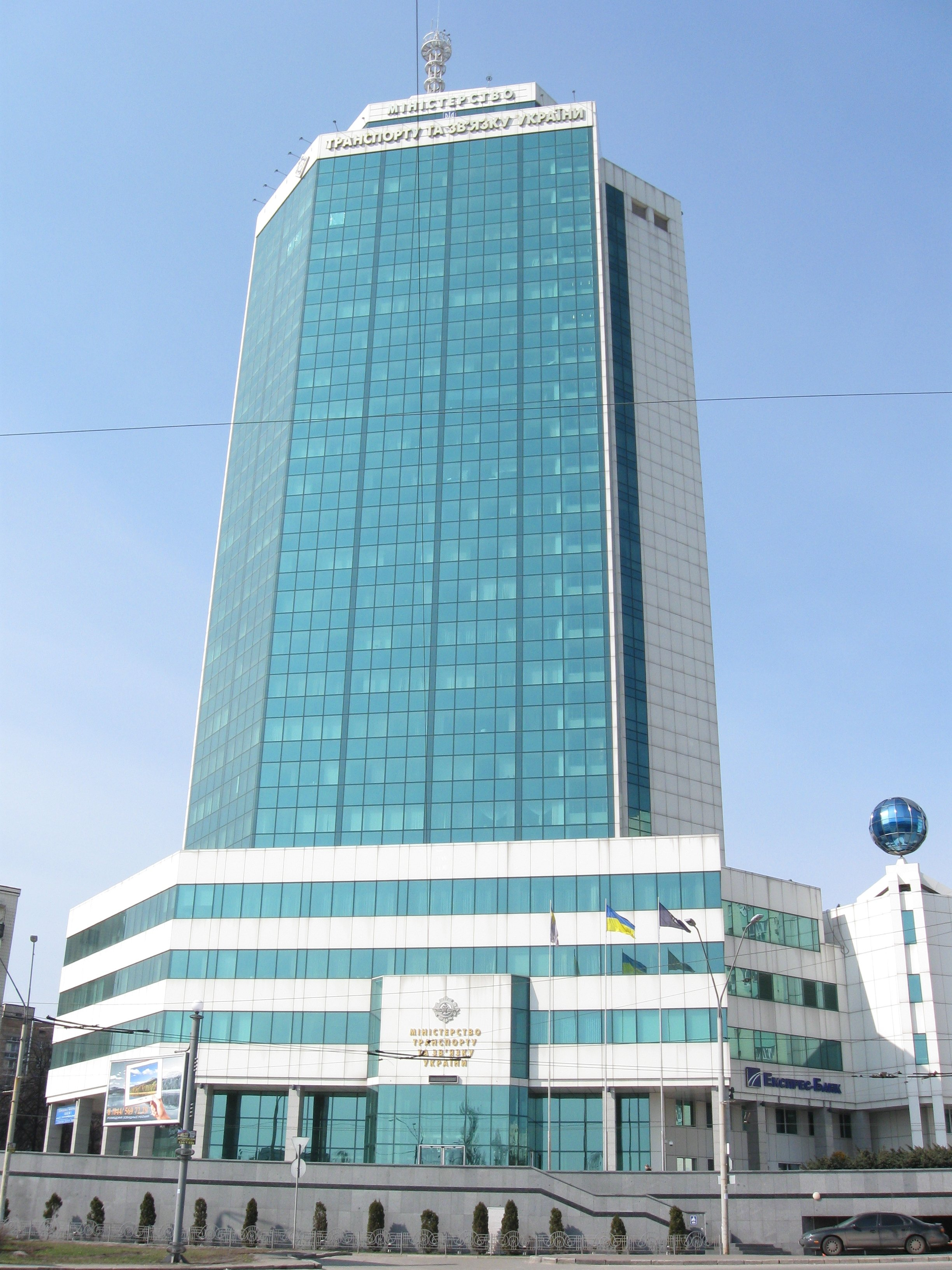
NBAAI headquarters, #14 Peremohy Ave. (UK)

The National Bureau of Air Accidents Investigation of Ukraine (NBAAI, Ukrainian: Національне бюро з розслідування авіаційних подій та інцидентів з цивільними повітряними суднами) is the national civil aviation incident investigation authority of Ukraine, a "specialist expert organization" consisting of 40 experts and subordinated to the Cabinet of Ministers of Ukraine.

The bureau was established on March 21, 2012, by the special Cabinet Decree #228 according to the provisions of the Aerial Code of Ukraine.

As of April 2012, Oleg Babenko was the Bureau Director

Bureau is headquartered in Kyiv at #14 Peremohy Ave. (highrise building of the Ministry of Infrastructure).

== History ==
The NBAAI had requested that the Dutch Safety Board (DSB) participate in the international investigation of Malaysia Airlines Flight 17; the DSB received formal notice of the accident from the NBAAI on 18 July 2014. The NBAAI delegated the investigation to the DSB because of the large number of Dutch passengers and the fact that the flight originated in Amsterdam.

== See also ==
- State Aviation Administration of Ukraine
