= 53rd Anti-Aircraft Missile Brigade =

53rd Guards Anti-Aircraft Missile Brigade (2023–present) 53rd Anti-Aircraft Missile Brigade (1967–2023) 268th Anti-Aircraft Missile Regiment (1961–1967)
- Russian: 53-я зенитная ракетная бригада
- Active: 1961–present
- Country: Soviet Union (1961–1991); Russia (1992–present)
- Branch: Soviet Army (1961–1991); Russian Ground Forces (1992–present)
- Type: Surface-to-air missile brigade
- Part of: 20th Guards Army
- Garrison/HQ: Kursk; MUN 32406
- Equipment: SA-11 Buk

Commanders
- Current commander: Colonel Sergey Muchkayev

The 53rd Guards Anti-Aircraft Missile Brigade is a surface-to-air missile brigade of the Russian Ground Forces. Part of the 20th Guards Army, the brigade is based at Kursk.

Formed from an anti-aircraft regiment in 1967 in Armenia, the brigade was transferred to East Germany shortly after its formation and served as part of the Group of Soviet Forces in Germany for the remainder of the Cold War. After the withdrawal of Soviet troops from Germany in 1992, the brigade was relocated to Kursk.

A joint investigation team of Australia, Belgium, Malaysia, the Netherlands and Ukraine has concluded that the brigade provided the unit that shot down Malaysia Airlines Flight 17 which killed 298 people.

On 21 February 2023, Russian president Vladimir Putin awarded the unit the honorary 'Guards' title for its service in the Invasion of Ukraine.

== History ==
=== Cold War ===
The 268th Anti-Aircraft Missile Regiment was formed in 1961 at Artik with the 7th Guards Army, equipped with the SA-2. On 1 October 1967, it was upgraded into the 53rd Anti-Aircraft Missile Brigade, with the 677th, 679th, and the 682nd Separate Anti-Aircraft Missile Battalions. Around this time the brigade received the SA-4 Krug missile system. Between 20 December 1968 and 7 January 1969 it transferred to East Germany. The brigade became part of the 1st Guards Tank Army at Altenburg. The 677th Battalion was based at Altenburg, the 679th at Merseburg, and the 682nd at Zeitz. On 1 October 1970 the 53rd was transferred to the 20th Guards Army but returned to the 1st Guards Tank Army in 1984. In November 1986 the 1578th Separate Anti-Aircraft Missile Battalion was formed at Oschatz after the 677th moved to Wittenberg. At this time the brigade was reequipped with the SA-11 Buk missile system. In 1992, the brigade was withdrawn to Kursk and became part of the 20th Guards Army.

=== Russian Ground Forces service ===
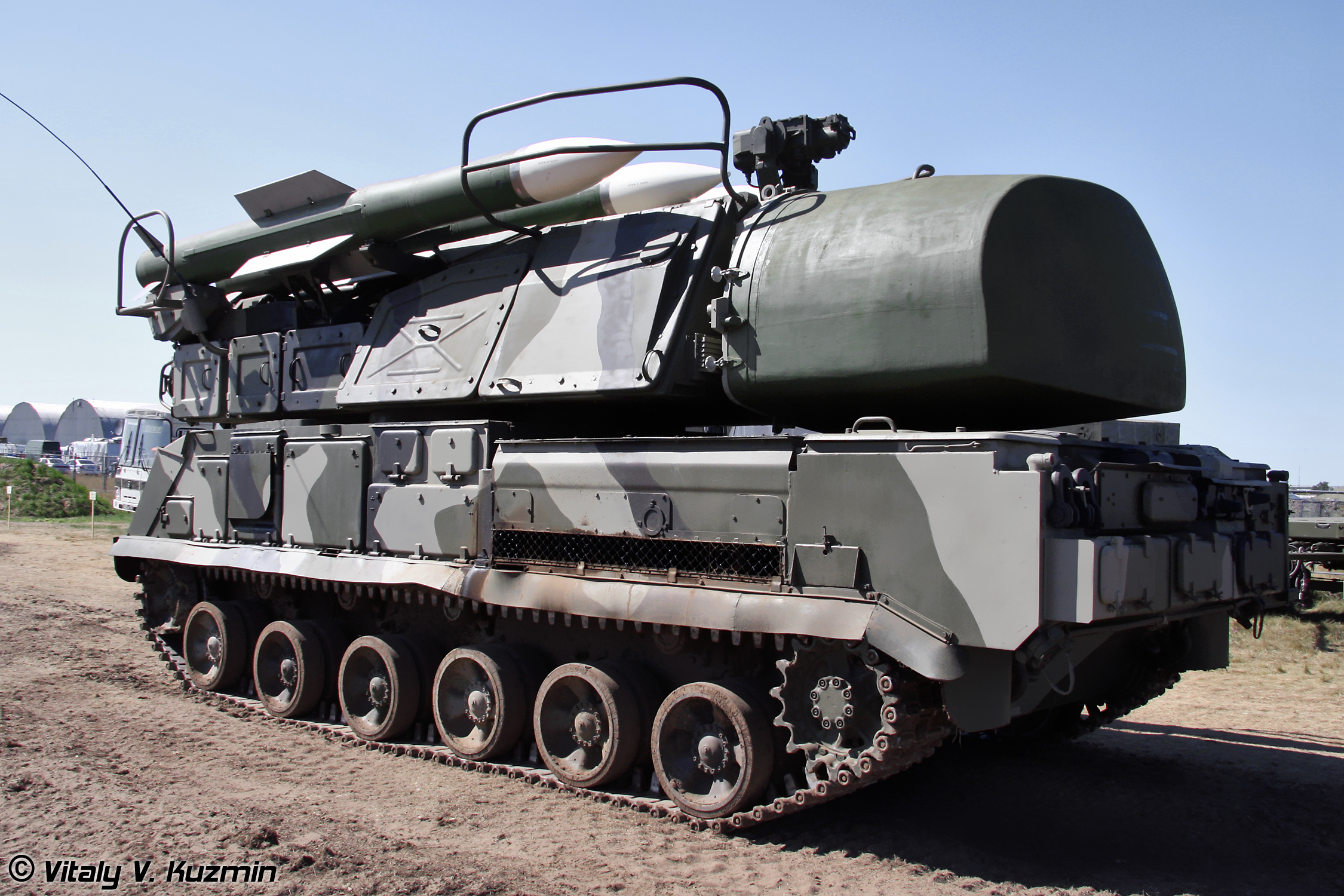
A Buk SAM of the type used by the brigade

Between 1994 and 1998, the 53rd was stationed in Gudauta as part of the Russian peacekeeping mission in Abkhazia. The brigade was repeatedly awarded the prize for being the best air defense brigade in the 20th Guards Army and the Moscow Military District for its performance during exercises between 2005 and 2008. The brigade participated in the 2008 Moscow Victory Day Parade and the exercises "Zapad-2009", "Zapad-2011", and "Zapad-2014."

=== The shooting down of Malaysia Airlines Flight 17 ===
Evidence comparing the vehicles at the scene with military equipment belonging to the brigade.

The brigade was reported by Bellingcat and Correctiv as providing the transporter erector launcher and radar (TELAR) unit that shot down Malaysia Airlines Flight 17 on 17 July 2014. According to Bellingcat's January 2016 investigation, the brigade's soldiers were involved in shooting down of the aircraft.

On 24 May 2018, the joint investigation team (JIT) concluded that MH17 was shot down using a Buk missile system belonging to the 53rd Anti-Aircraft Missile Brigade.

== Commanders ==
The brigade has been commanded by the following officers.

- Colonel I.P. Popov (1967–1973)
- Colonel A.S. Samoylenko (1973–1977)
- Colonel Y.S. Dudchenko (1977–1983)
- Colonel Yu. A. Yarchak (1983–1985)
- Colonel Yu. V. Filkov (1985–1991)
- Colonel I.P. Kondrashov (1991–1992)
- Colonel G.N. Chernov (1992–2004)
- Colonel Alexander Viktorovich Donets (2005–2009)
- Colonel V.V. Kukushkin (2009–2011)
- Colonel A. Vi. Rokossovski (2011–2014)
- Colonel Sergey Borisovich Muchkayev (2014–present)
