= General rating of city appeal =

The general rating of city appeal — is a method for calculating and comparing the city appeal and urban environment, based on determining their number values and the threshold of appeal. The method is based on collection, description and assessment of qualitative and quantitative indices. Quantitative indices are represented by annual statistical data on the cities of the Russian Federation, whereas qualitative characteristics are represented by own properties of a city. The purpose of the rating is to carry out an integrated collective and public analysis of the urban environment, compare urban environments, analyze strengthens and weaknesses and to prepare information for managerial analysis and to make personnel decisions.^{[5]}

== Description ==
The general rating of city appeal for Russian cities was designed by the Russian Union of Engineers in 2012. The rating was designed due to the objective need to conduct a complex analysis and assess disproportions in distribution of population, labour resources and production capacity in the Russian Federation.

The purpose of the rating is to carry out an unbiased and complex appraisal of Russian cities in terms of the criteria which determine the quality level of all spheres of activity of the population, city economy and urban environment.

=== Tasks ===
- To analyze the existing Russian and foreign methods and practices of comparing administrative and territorial units of macroregions and countries.
- To conduct a comprehensive research and determine the criteria and basic indicators of appraisal of cities by means of selected theoretical and methodological disciplines, related to the appraisal of qualitative and quantitative characteristics of objects under research.
- To develop a rating methodology, based on the best Russian and foreign practices.
- To develop a complex rating methodology for comparing cities on the basis of a system of economic parameters.
- To develop a system social and economic parameters, fully charactering functioning of cities.
- To calculate integral parameters, indices and groups of indices in accordance with the developed methodology.
- To outline typical groups (typology) of items according to a range of features, specify similarities and differences in their development outline significant individual differences and analyze the results.
- To develop a monitoring system of social and economic status of the cities under research.

== Rating methodology ==
The methodology of appraisal of city appeal is based on quality assessment of elements of the city economy and comfort of living of citizens. The main method is a procedure borrowed from qualimetry, in which several approaches to quantitative appraisal of quality were developed.

To compare various properties measured in scales different in range and dimension $K_i$, a relative dimensionless ratio, is used to show the degree of approximation of $Qi$, (absolute property indicator) to the maximum $Q^{max}$, and minimum $Q^{min}$. The relative ratio is described as the following relationship $Ki=f{(Q^{min},\ldots,Q_i,\ldots,Q^{max})}$, which may be represented as a normalized function as follows $K_i=\frac{Q_i-Q^{min}}{Q^{max}-Q^{min}}$

To compare the relativities of all properties included in the tree of properties $G_i$, dimensionless importance ratios are used. For the purposes of convenience the following is usually assumed $0<G_i<1$, and $\sum_{i=1}^N G_i=1$

The values of importance ratios are determined with the help of expert and non-expert (analytical) methods. This study combines both techniques (as described below). The relative importance was determined using a method of expert survey involving 50 experts of various industries and areas of business, different social and professional status.

Thus, the qualitative appraisal of quality $K_k$ is expressed using the following formula

$K_k=K_ef \sum_{i=1}^N K_iG_i$, where

$K_ef=1$ for all indices forming a part of the final general index of city appeal. The general city appeal index is directly calculated as an average compound of all characteristics

$G(K_1, K_2, \ldots, K_n)=\sqrt[n]{K_1K_2\cdots K_n}=\left(\prod_{i=1}^n K_i\right)^{1/n}$

The key problem of selection of the minimum combination of properties (indicators) forming a part of the item quality may be solved through the functional and typological analysis considering the quality as a system of objective properties, and based on the volume of the original information (statistical and open-access information). Therefore, to conduct the appraisal, 70 quasisimple properties were selected, forming 41 overall indices, which are, in their turn, interpreted as 13 indices.

== Ranking results ==
The top ten cities are characterized by high indicators in nearly all the aspects. The only exception is the housing affordability factor, in terms of which the leading cities have low indicators because of high prices for 1 square meter of residential space. The cities leading in terms of most indicators are million-plus cities (Moscow, Saint Petersburg, Novosibirsk, Yekaterinburg, Kazan, Krasnoyarsk, Rostov-on-Don, and others); cities having development advantages (Vladivostok, Krasnodar, Sochi, and Kaliningrad); cities that are attractive from the point of view of investments (Tomsk, Omsk, Surgut, Tyumen, Irkutsk, Yaroslavl, Saratov); and Moscow Region cities with high construction rate (Podolsk, Khimki, Balashikha and Mytishchi).

The medium-ranked cities are the cities characterized by dynamic development (Kaluga, Krasnodar, Kislovodsk); industrial cities (Pervouralsk, Chelyabinsk, Ulyanovsk, Kamensk-Uralsky, Shakhty); the single-industry city of Naberezhnye Chelny, as well as Bryansk, Ryazan, Vologda, and Yoshkar-Ola.

The following cities are noted for satisfactory development levels: Orsk, Ulan-Ude, Orenburg, Sterlitamak, Syzran, Ussuriysk, Oktyabrsky, Votkinsk, single-industry cities Magnitogorsk, Nizhni Tagil, and the single-industry city having the highest investment inflow – Nakhodka.

The bottom-ranked cities in most subratings are the North Caucasus cities (Kaspiysk and Yessentuki), cities of the Altai Territory (Rubtsovsk, Barnaul, Biysk), single-industry cities Leninsk-Kuznetsky and Severodvinsk, as well as Artyom, Miass, Novocheboksarsk and Kopeisk. Yamalo-Nenets Autonomous District cities Novy Urengoy and Noyabrsk, in spite of high economic indicators, generally lose on 50% of the indicators.

Overall ranking indicates considerable disproportions in city potential, which becomes clear, if we delete population dynamics indices from the rating. Thus, if we exclude this parameter, the potential of the 1st city will be more than twice as high as of the 10th city and 10 times higher than the potential of the 100th city. Evidently, such a high difference is determined by objective difference of potentials of the cities; it is also important to notice that, in accordance with the Pareto principle, it is not obligatory to improve all the components of qualitative appraisal of cities. Here, the key aspect is economic potential.

It is also necessary to compare some social factors, first of all, the development of healthcare, education, social services because these are the key indicators.

The overall ranking of cities in the rating shows that even absolute leaders are not so far from the cities in the middle of the rating. This is caused by leveling of low indicators of parameters of some leaders. In particular, the value of the general index of Omsk, which ranks 10th, is just 1,2 times (by 20%) higher than that of the mid-city Mezhdurechensk. The only exception is Moscow (the value of the general indicator is 3 times higher than that of Mezhdurechensk; 2,5 times higher than that of the 10th city – Omsk – and twice as high as of the 3rd city – Novosibirsk).

Besides, if we analyze the total of indicators of all the cities as their total potential, then the weight of Moscow – the leader of the rating – is 2%, and the weight of Grozny – the last in the rating - is 0,6%.

For most cities it can be said that the level of economic and industrial development would differ very much depending on living conditions. This is true for nearly all cities. For example, Syberia and Ural are centers for hydrocarbon production and metal mining. With the highest income rates per capita, these cities are characterized by the worst natural climatic conditions and low-developed transport system.

The group of mid-cities comprises rather different cities, ranging from the largest metallurgic mono-cities – Chelyabinsk, Magnitogorsk, Kamensk-Uralsky to cities with quite versatile economy – Vladimir, Yuzhno-Sakhalinsk, Volzhsky. On the whole, this group consists of either industrially developed centers with negative natural and climatic conditions, or mid-cities of old-cultivated regions, characterized by primarily average values of all indicators.

The lowest indices are found among underdeveloped cities of the North Caucasus and South Siberia. This is connected primarily with agricultural specialization of the economy of these cities and adverse effect of conflicts which took place on the territory of the North Caucasus. The group of depressed cities also includes former large and middle-sized industrial centers which are primarily mono-cities – Zlatoust (metallurgy), Leninsk-Kuznetsky (metallurgy), Norilsk (metallurgy), Severodvinsk (defense industry complex). In money terms, the income difference may be more than by 6,7 times, and, as a rule, not in favour of underdeveloped cities, where income growth rate may be observed primarily in budget sectors and general income growth rate is low. In addition, real income of population grows faster, which is determined by constant production growth in innovation industries.

== Theoretical implications ==
The study and appraisal of urban environment, namely, the parameter of appeal for internal and external factors and consumers, is of value:

- For economic science, from the point of view of developing a system of complex research and appraisal of the quality of Russian cities, making development plans directed at comprehensive satisfaction of needs of population;
- For sociology, determining the key factors of perception of the city as a whole and of its individual elements.
- For the development of management potential of municipal authorities in terms of balanced management of the system of urban infrastructure.

== Practical implications of the rating ==
On November 21, 2012, in the Polytechnical Museum of Moscow, the Russian Union of Engineers presented the General rating of appeal of Russian cities for 2011, which attracted much interest among the general public, Mass Media and local, regional and federal authorities.

On May 20, 2013, the Ministry of Regional Development of the Russian Federation, the Federal Agency of Construction and Housing of the Russian Federation, Russian Union of Engineers and the experts of Lomonosov Moscow State University developed a rating and methodology of evaluation of urban environment and analyzed 50 largest Russian cities. For this work, the Union designed the methods of urban environment quality assessment and a city appeal threshold. The rating has been developed:

- by the order the President of the Russian Federation defined in paragraph 1 of Assignments No. Pr-534 of the President of the Russian Federation as of February 29, 2012, to executive bodies as a result of the meeting “On measures of implementation of the housing policy” as of February 14, 2012
- by the order of the Chairman of the Government of the Russian Federation defined in paragraph 4 of the List of assignments № VP-P9-1581 “On development of a methodology of assessment of urban environment quality and assessment of the major cities of Russia” of the Chairman of the Government of the Russian Federation as March 20, 2012.
