= Zaroshchenske =

Zaroshchenske Зарощенське
- Rural settlement
- Location within Ukraine
- Coordinates: 47°58′15″N 38°24′51″E
- Country: Ukraine
- Oblast: Donetsk Oblast

Population (2001 census)
  - Total: 14
- Time zone: UTC+2 (EET)
  - Summer (DST): UTC+3 (EEST)
- Postal code: 86203
- Area code: +380 6255

Zaroshchenske (Ukrainian: Зарощенське) is a rural settlement in Horlivka Raion, Donetsk Oblast, eastern Ukraine. As of 2001 it had a population of 348 people.

Since August 2014, it has been under the occupation of pro-Russian forces.
