= Hrabove, Donetsk Oblast =

Hrabove Грабове Грабово
- Village
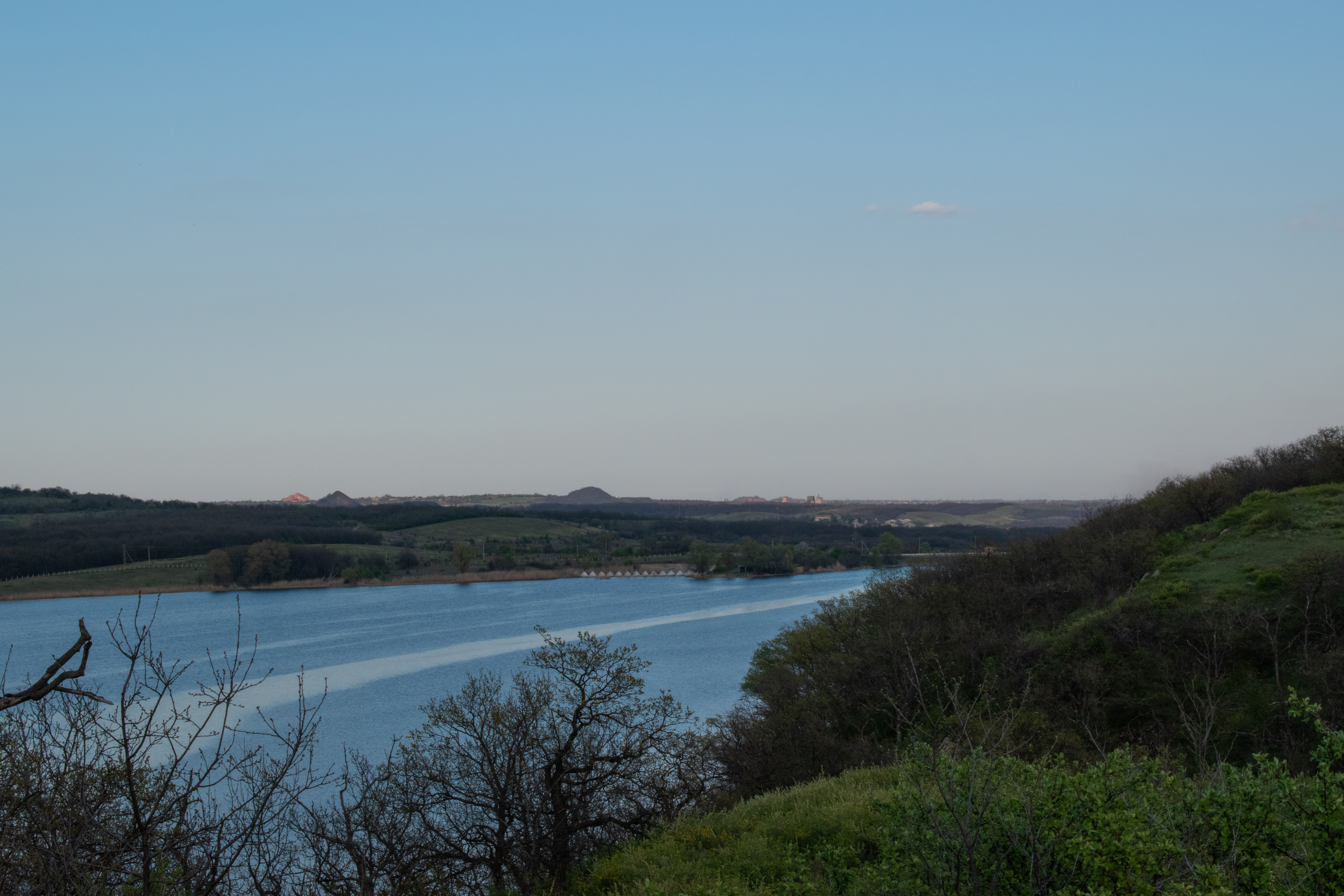
- View towards Hrabove from across the Mius

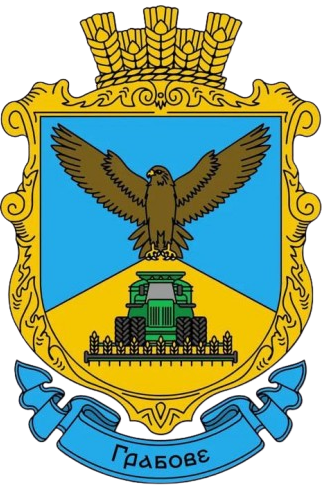
- Coat of arms
- Interactive map of Hrabove
- Location of Hrabove in Donetsk Oblast Hrabove (Donetsk Oblast)
- Coordinates: 48°08′45″N 38°38′54″E
- Country: Ukraine
- Oblast: Donetsk Oblast
- Raion: Horlivka Raion

Government
  - Village Head: Volodymyr Berezhnyi

Area
  - Total: 8.56 km^{2} (3.31 sq mi)
- Elevation: 190 m (620 ft)

Population (2001 census)
  - Total: 1,000
  - Density: 120/km^{2} (300/sq mi)
- Time zone: UTC+2 (EET)
  - Summer (DST): UTC+3 (EEST)
- Postal code: 86234
- Area code: +380 6255
- Website: w1.c1.rada.gov.ua

Hrabove (Ukrainian: Грабове, also spelled as Grabove), also known as Grabovo (Russian: Грабово, romanized: Grabovo) is a village in Horlivka Raion, Donetsk Oblast, eastern Ukraine. Its population was 1,000 as of the 2001 Ukrainian census. It is known for being the crash site of Malaysia Airlines Flight 17, which was shot down by Igor Girkin, Sergey Dubinsky, and Leonid Kharchenko, and crashed in the south of the village.

Hrabove is located beside the Mius river, some ten kilometers north-east of Shakhtarsk, and on the border between the Donetsk and Luhansk Oblast.

== History ==
The village was founded in the late 15th century on the left bank of the river Mius; it was repositioned to its present site in 1787.

A stone church, the Holy Trinity Church, was built in 1803. Its basic form survives to this day, though it was substantially rebuilt in 1903.

After the fall of the Russian Empire, Hrabove was part of the Ukrainian People's Republic. In February 1918, it came under the control of the Makhnovshchina, led by the anarchist revolutionary Nestor Makhno. After the Ukrainian–Soviet War, Hrabove became part of the Ukrainian Soviet Socialist Republic.

During World War II, the area was occupied by Nazi Germany at the conclusion of Operation Barbarossa. It returned to Soviet control following the Donbas strategic offensive of August 1943.

Following the outbreak of the war in Donbas in 2014, Hrabove fell under the control of the Russian-backed breakaway Donetsk People's Republic. In 2022, Russia launched an invasion of Ukraine and unilaterally annexed Donetsk, Kherson, Luhansk and Zaporizhzhia oblasts. In Ukrainian law, Hrabove and the other annexed regions remain part of the "temporarily occupied territories" of Ukraine.

=== Shootdown of Malaysia Airlines Flight 17 ===
The village came to international attention when it became the site of much of the debris from the destruction of the Boeing 777 operating Malaysia Airlines Flight 17 from Amsterdam to Kuala Lumpur, which was shot down in the region on 17 July 2014, killing all 298 on board. At the time, Hrabove was in the area contested by Ukrainian military forces and Russian separatist forces as part of the war in Donbas, and since 2014 has been under the control of the Donetsk People's Republic.

== Politics and national identities ==
The 2001 census indicated a population of 1,000 people, categorized according to preferred mother tongue as 77.5 percent Ukrainian speaking and 22.0 percent Russian speaking, with a handful of Belarusian speakers. Most people living in the village identify as Ukrainian.

Since 2010 the head of the village council has been Volodymyr Berezhnyi (born 1955).
