= List of fatalities from aviation accidents =

Lists of people and groups who died in plane/helicopter crashes

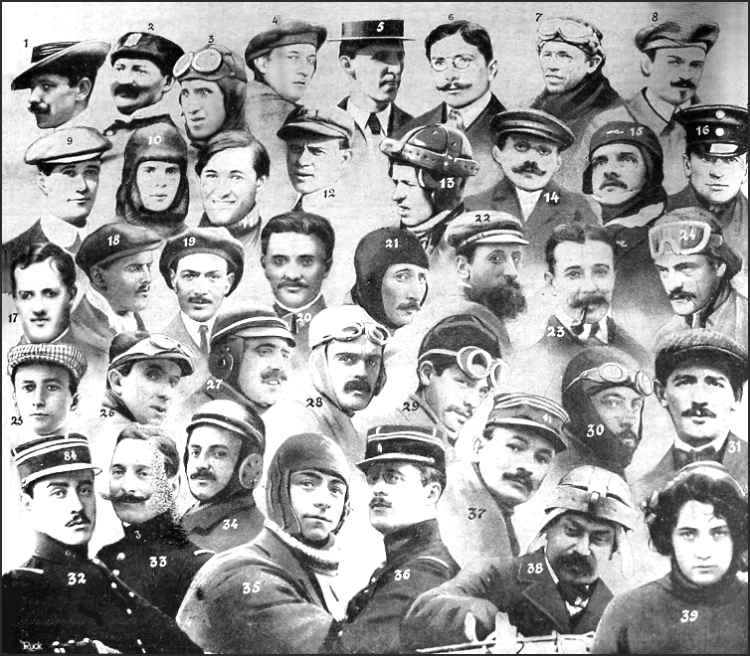
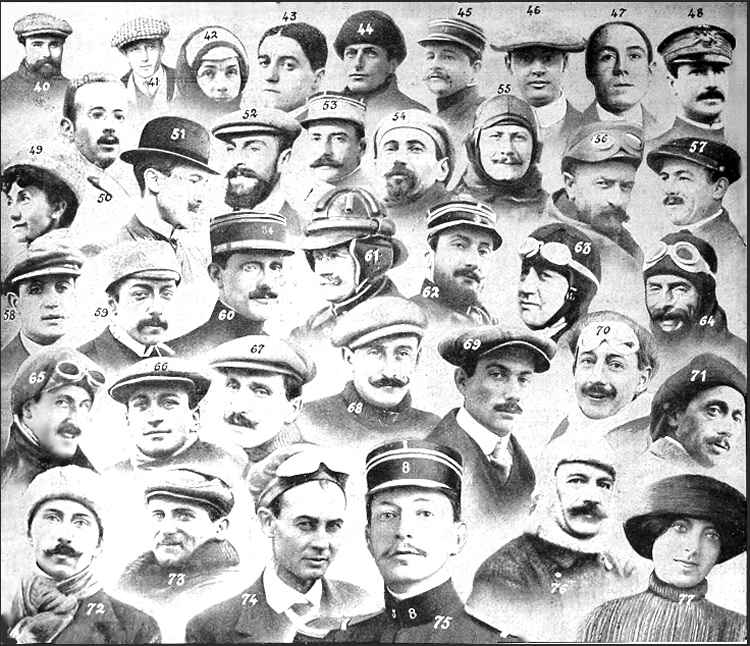
Aviators who died prior to 1912

Many notable human fatalities have resulted from aviation accidents and incidents.

Those killed as part of a sporting, political, or musical group who flew together when the accident took place are usually only listed under the group sections; however, some are also listed as individuals.

== Individuals ==
Name	Nationality	Year	Notability	Flight/aircraft	Crash site	Cause/circumstances
Aaliyah	United States	2001	Actress, singer, and model	Cessna 402	Marsh Harbour, Abaco Islands, The Bahamas	Maximum takeoff weight of airplane substantially exceeded, pilot under the influence of cocaine and alcohol.
Michael J. Adams	United States	1967	Test pilot	X-15 Flight 3-65-97	Randsburg, California, United States	Breakup caused by malfunctioning control system
Adolf II, Prince of Schaumburg-Lippe	Germany	1936	Prince of Schaumburg-Lippe	Ford Trimotor	Zumpango, Mexico	Unspecified engine trouble
Yahaya Ahmad	Malaysia	1997	Entrepreneur, founder of DRB-HICOM	Agusta A109P	Kuala Lipis, Pahang, Malaysia	Mid-air explosion
Sir John Alcock	United Kingdom	1919	Aviator who flew the first non-stop flight across the Atlantic	Vickers Viking	Cottévrard, near Rouen, France	Plane stalled and crashed in fog
Humberto de Alencar Castelo Branco	Brazil	1967	Former President of Brazil	Piper Aztec	Fortaleza, Brazil	In mid-air collision with a Brazilian Air Force Lockheed T-33
Walter Alessandroni	United States	1966	Politician, Pennsylvania Attorney General	Piper PA-23	Somerset County, Pennsylvania, United States	Pilot error
Davey Allison	United States	1993	NASCAR driver	Hughes 369	Talladega, Alabama, United States	Pilot error
Modi Alon	Israel	1948	Military, first IAF pilot to command a combat squadron and to score an aerial victory	Avia S-199	Herzliya, Israel	Struck terrain nose-down after apparent engine trouble during a gear-up landing attempt
Hans Alsér	Sweden	1977	Table tennis player	Linjeflyg Flight 618	Kälvesta, Sweden	Icing of tailplane caused by engines being operated at too low a power setting for anti-ice to be effective
Roald Amundsen	Norway	1928	Explorer	Latham 47	Barents Sea	Disappearance
An Chang-nam	Korea	1930	Aviator		Taiyuan, China	
Maxie Anderson	United States	1983	Record-setting hot-air balloonist	Hot-air balloon	Near Bad Brückenau, West Germany	Gondola release mechanism malfunction
Scott D. Anderson	United States	1999	Minnesota Air National Guard test pilot	Cirrus SR20	Federal Prison Camp, Duluth	Aileron jam during early production flight testing
Elsa Andersson	Sweden	1922	Aviator, parachutist	Parachute	Askersund, Sweden	Parachute failure
Juan Marcos Angelini	Argentina	2018	Racing driver, Turismo Carretera	Pitts Special	Carreras, Santa Fe Province, Argentina	
David Angell	United States	2001	Producer	American Airlines Flight 11	World Trade Center North Tower, New York City	9/11 hijacking by Mohamed Atta
Toivo Antikainen	Finland	1941	Communist leader, military officer		Arkhangelsk, Soviet Union	Was allegedly killed in a plane crash, but some claim he died in Moscow under suspicious circumstances.
Steve Appleton	United States	2012	CEO of Micron at time of incident	Lancair IV-P	Boise Airport, Idaho, United States	Error during emergency landing
Allen Bathurst, Lord Apsley	United Kingdom	1942	Army Officer and Member of Parliament	Handley Page Halifax	Luqa, Malta	Crashed on takeoff
Mel Apt	United States	1956	Test pilot	Bell X-2	Edwards AFB, California, United States	Pilot error
Abdul Salam Arif	Iraq	1966	President of Iraq	de Havilland Dove 1	Southern Iraq	Crashed in a sand storm
Florence Arthaud	France	2015	Sailor	Eurocopter AS350	Villa Castelli, Argentina	Collided in mid-air; see 2015 Villa Castelli mid-air collision
Garnet "Ace" Bailey	Canada	2001	Ice hockey player (NHL)	United Airlines Flight 175	World Trade Center South Tower, New York City	9/11 hijacking by Marwan al-Shehhi
Valentine Baker	United Kingdom	1942	World War I flying ace	Martin-Baker MB 3	RAF Wing, Buckinghamshire, United Kingdom	Engine failure
Daniel Balavoine	France	1986	Singer and songwriter	Aérospatiale AS350 Ecureuil	Gourma-Rharous, Mali	Controlled flight into terrain during a sandstorm, with Thierry Sabine when crashed
G. M. C. Balayogi	India	2002	Politician	Bell 206	Kaikalur, India	Mechanical failure, pilot error
Italo Balbo	Italy	1940	Governor-General of Italian Libya	Savoia-Marchetti SM.79	Tobruk, Italian North Africa	Shot down by friendly fire, Italian anti-aircraft batteries defending the airfield misidentified the aircraft as British
Frederick Banting	Canada	1941	Scientist, co-discovered insulin	Lockheed Hudson	Musgrave Harbour, Newfoundland, Canada	Engine problems
Heinrich Bär	West Germany	1957	Test pilot	LF-1 Zaunkönig	Braunschweig, West Germany	Lost control of aircraft
Silvio Barbato	Italy	2009	Conductor and composer	Air France Flight 447	Atlantic Ocean	Pilot error
Bill Barilko	Canada	1951	Ice hockey player (NHL)	Fairchild 24	100 km N of Cochrane, Ontario, Canada	Pilot inexperience, poor weather, overloaded cargo
Stephen Barnes	United States	2020	Personal injury attorney	TBM 700	Pembroke, New York	Unknown
René Barrientos	Bolivia	1969	President of Bolivia	Hiller UH-12	Arque, Cochabamba Department, Bolivia	Rotors caught on power lines
Charles Bassett	United States	1966	Astronaut	Northrop T-38 Talon	St. Louis, Missouri, United States	With Elliot See; 1966 NASA T-38 crash
Tomáš Baťa	Czechoslovakia	1932	Founder of Bata Shoes company	Junkers F.13	Otrokovice, Czechoslovakia	Poor weather
Mark Bavis	United States	2001	Ice hockey player (AHL)	United Airlines Flight 175	World Trade Center South Tower, New York City	9/11 hijacking by Marwan al-Shehhi
Lincoln Beachey	United States	1915	Aviator, stunt flyer	Beachey-Eaton Monoplane	San Francisco, California, United States	Demonstrating inverted flight at the Panama–Pacific International Exposition. Structural failure while attempting to pull up.
Todd Beamer	United States	2001	Oracle Corporation employee	United Airlines Flight 93	Shanksville, Pennsylvania, United States	9/11 hijacking by Ziad Jarrah
William D. Becker	United States	1943	Politician, mayor of St. Louis	Waco CG-4A-RO	Lambert Field, St. Louis, Missouri, United States	Loss of right wing due to wing strut fitting failure during demonstration flight; Maj. William B. Robertson also dies in this accident
Nick Begich Sr.	United States	1972	US Congressman from Alaska	Cessna 310	Alaska, United States	Disappeared, body never recovered, presumed dead. Hale Boggs was also on this flight.
Derek Bennett	United Kingdom	1978	Racing car designer, driver and founder / owner of Chevron Cars Ltd	Hiway Scorpion B hang glider	Lancashire, United Kingdom	Competed in a competitive event organized by his club. Pilot error likely to have caused by stall whilst attempting a challenging manoeuvre. The pilot had 18 months flying experience.
Berry Berenson	United States	2001	Entertainer, actress, and photographer	American Airlines Flight 11	World Trade Center North Tower, New York City	9/11 hijacking by Mohamed Atta
Brook Berringer	United States	1996	Quarterback for the Nebraska Cornhuskers	Piper J-3 Cub	Raymond, Nebraska, United States	Pilot error (loss of engine power because of fuel valve mis-position)
Lloyd W. Bertaud	United States	1927	Aviator	Old Glory	North Atlantic	Aircraft crashed during an attempt at a transatlantic flight from the United States to Italy.
Lauren Bessette	United States	1999	Sister-in-law of John F. Kennedy Jr.	Piper Saratoga	Martha's Vineyard, Cape Cod, Massachusetts, United States	Pilot error; see John F. Kennedy Jr. plane crash
Carolyn Bessette-Kennedy	United States	1999	Wife of John F. Kennedy Jr.	Piper Saratoga	Martha's Vineyard, Cape Cod, Massachusetts, United States	Pilot error; see John F. Kennedy Jr. plane crash
Tony Bettenhausen Jr.	United States	2000	CART racing driver/owner	Beechcraft Baron	Ann Milton Adams' farm, Harrison County, Kentucky, United States	Airframe icing
Carolyn Beug	United States	2001	Video producer and director music video	American Airlines Flight 11	World Trade Center North Tower, New York City	9/11 hijacking by Mohamed Atta
George Beurling	Canada	1948	World War II ace pilot	Noorduyn Norseman	Rome, Italy	Possible sabotage
Neerja Bhanot	India	1986	Flight attendant who saved lives during a hijacking	Pan Am Flight 73	Karachi, Pakistan	Hijacking
Homi J. Bhabha	India	1966	Nuclear physicist	Air India Flight 101	Mont Blanc, France	Flight dispatched without necessary navigation equipment for the route being flown
Greg Biffle	United States	2025	Retired NASCAR driver	Cessna Citation II	Statesville, North Carolina, United States	Under investigation; see 2025 North Carolina Cessna Citation II crash
Džemal Bijedić	Yugoslavia	1977	Premier of Yugoslavia	Learjet 25	Kreševo, Yugoslavia	Poor weather conditions
Salem bin Laden	Saudi Arabia	1988	Entrepreneur and half-brother of Osama bin Laden	JMB VL-3 Sprint ultra-light aircraft	San Antonio, Texas, United States	Flew into power lines
Muhammad bin Ladin	Saudi Arabia	1967	Entrepreneur and father of Osama bin Laden	Beechcraft Model 18	Oom, 'Asir Province, Saudi Arabia	
Mark Bingham	United States	2001	Public relations executive	United Airlines Flight 93	Shanksville, Pennsylvania, United States	9/11 hijacking by Ziad Jarrah
Jean-Pierre Blanchard	France	1809	Hot air ballooning pioneer	Hot air balloon	The Hague, Netherlands	Died from injuries sustained after falling out of a balloon during cardiac arrest
Sophie Blanchard	France	1819	Female ballooning pioneer	Hot air balloon	Jardin de Tivoli, Paris, France	Fell to her death after the balloon caught fire
Ricardo Boechat	Brazil	2019	Journalist	Bell 206B	São Paulo, São Paulo	Under investigation; see 2019 São Paulo helicopter crash
Barthélemy Boganda	Central African Republic	1959	1st Prime Minister of the Central African Republic	Nord Noratlas	Boda, Lobaye, Central African Republic	Mid-air explosion
Hale Boggs	United States	1972	Politician, US Congressman from Louisiana	Cessna 310	southern Alaska, United States	Disappeared, body never recovered, presumed dead. Nick Begich was also in this flight.
Robert M. Bond	United States	1984	US Air Force lieutenant general	MIG-23	Jackass Flats, Nevada, United States	Reacted improperly to afterburner malfunction, lost aircraft control, fatally injured ejecting at excessive speed
Richard Bong	United States	1945	World War II fighter ace and test pilot	Lockheed P-80 Shooting Star	Burbank, California, United States	Pilot error
Billy Joe Booth	United States	1972	Canadian football player for the Ottawa Rough Riders	Piper Cherokee	Dorchester, Ontario, Canada	Thunderstorm
Bruce Borland	United States	1999	Golf course designer	Learjet 35	Mina, South Dakota, United States	Hypoxia; see 1999 South Dakota Learjet crash. Payne Stewart also died in this accident.
Subhas Chandra Bose	India	1945	Politician and freedom fighter	Mitsubishi Ki-21	Taipei, Japanese Taiwan (alleged)	Cause disputed
Ahmed Ould Bouceif	Mauritania	1979	Politician, Prime Minister of Mauritania	de Havilland Canada DHC-5 Buffalo	Dakar, Senegal	
Olin Branstetter	United States	2011	Businessman and former Oklahoma state senator	Piper PA-28 Cherokee N7746W	Perryville, Arkansas, United States	Controlled flight into terrain
Michel Breistroff	France	1996	Ice hockey defenseman for the Ligue Magnus	TWA Flight 800	East Moriches, New York, United States	Mid-air explosion
Ron Brown	United States	1996	Politician, US Secretary of Commerce	Boeing CT-43	Dubrovnik, Croatia	Pilot error
Kobe Bryant	United States	2020	Retired NBA all-star basketball player	Sikorsky S-76	Calabasas, California, United States	Uncontrolled flight into terrain due to pilot error (continued VFR into IMC) and spatial disorientation; John Altobelli also died in the crash. See 2020 Calabasas helicopter crash.
Oleg Bryjak	Germany	2015	Bass-baritone opera singer	Germanwings Flight 9525	Prads-Haute-Bléone, Alpes-de-Haute-Provence, France	Co-pilot committed murder–suicide by deliberately crashing the plane, killing all 150 passengers. His colleague Maria Radner was also on board.
Kurt Budke	United States	2011	College basketball coach	Piper PA-28 Cherokee N7746W	Perryville, Arkansas, United States	Controlled flight into terrain
Antony Bulwer-Lytton, Viscount Knebworth	United Kingdom	1933	Politician	Hawker Hart	RAF Hendon	Aircraft failed to recover from dive while practising display for air pageant
Milo Burcham	United States	1944	Test pilot for Lockheed	Lockheed YP-80 Shooting Star	Burbank, California, United States	Engine flame-out
Tom Burnett	United States	2001	Vice President and Chief Operating Officer of Thoratec Corporation	United Airlines Flight 93	Shanksville, Pennsylvania, United States	9/11 hijacking by Ziad Jarrah
William D. Byron	United States	1941	Politician; US Congressman from Maryland	Eastern Air Lines Flight 21	Atlanta, Georgia, United States	Inadvertently descended into trees due to incorrect altimeter setting. Eddie Rickenbacker survived this crash.
Tomas Cabili	Philippines	1957	Philippine senator	Douglas C-47 Skytrain	Mount Manunggal, Balamban, Cebu, Philippines (22 mi NW)	See 1957 Cebu Douglas C-47 crash
Felipe Camiroaga	Chile	2011	Television presenter (Television Nacional de Chile)	Chilean Air Force CASA C-212 Aviocar	off Robinson Crusoe Island, Chile	Loss of control in adverse weather
Eduardo Campos	Brazil	2014	Politician, presidential candidate in Brazilian general election, 2014	2014 Santos Cessna Citation crash	Santos, Brazil	Nose-down collision with ground during poor weather shortly after aborting landing, caused by pilot disorientation.
Fanny Cano	Mexico	1983	Entertainer, actress	Aviaco Flight 134	Madrid, Spain	Collision resulting from runway incursion, caused by poor visibility and taxiway signage
Guido Cantelli	Italy	1956	Orchestra conductor	1956 Paris DC-6 crash	Paris-Orly Airport, France	Crashed on takeoff
Gheorghe Caranda	Romania	1912	Army officer, first Romanian airplane accident casualty	Farman	Bucharest, Romania	Plane crash during training on Cotroceni Airfield
Mel Carnahan	United States	2000	Governor of Missouri	Cessna 335	Goldman, Missouri, United States	Thunderstorm
Bernt Carlsson	Sweden	1988	Assistant-Secretary-General of the UN, UN Commissioner for Namibia	Pan Am Flight 103	Lockerbie, Scotland, United Kingdom	Terrorism
Emilio Carranza	Mexico	1928	Mexican "Charles Lindbergh"	Ryan Brougham	Tabernacle, New Jersey, United States	Weather?
Sonny Carter	United States	1991	Astronaut	Atlantic Southeast Airlines Flight 2311	Brunswick, Georgia, United States	Malfunction of the left engine propeller control unit. Senator John Tower also died in this crash.
Claudio Cassinelli	Italy	1985	Actor	Bell 206B	Page, Arizona, United States	Rotor blades struck bridge due to pilot error and aircraft fell into canyon during filming of Vendetta dal futuro
Kathleen Cavendish, Marchioness of Hartington	United States	1948	Sister of U.S. President John F. Kennedy	de Havilland Dove	Saint-Bauzile, Ardèche, France	
Cecilie, Hereditary Grand Duchess of Hesse	Greece	1937	Princess of Greece and Denmark, sister of Prince Philip	Junkers Ju 52	Ostend, Belgium	Crashed into a factory chimney; see 1937 Sabena Junkers Ju 52 Ostend crash
Carl Cederström	Sweden	1918	Aviator	Blériot XI	Gulf of Bothnia	
Marcel Cerdan	France	1949	World boxing champion	Lockheed Constellation	São Miguel Island, Azores, Portugal	Controlled flight into terrain, mountain
Frank Charles	United Kingdom	1939	Motorcycle speedway rider	Slingsby Petrel	Great Hucklow, Derbyshire, East Midlands, England	Died in gliding competition
Bill Chase	United States	1974	Trumpet player and band leader	Piper PA-30 Twin Comanche	Jackson, Minnesota, United States	Poor weather
Jorge Chávez	Peru	1910	Aviator	Blériot XI	Domodossola, Italy	Inadequate repairs to aircraft
Néstor Chávez	Venezuela	1969	Major League Baseball player	Viasa Flight 742	Maracaibo, Venezuela	Struck power lines during takeoff
Valery Chekalov	Russia	2023	Head of logistics of Wagner Group	Embraer Legacy 600	Kuzhenkino, Tver Oblast, Russia	Under investigation; see 2023 Wagner Group plane crash
Saulos Chilima	Malawi	2024	Vice-President of Malawi	Dornier 228	Chikangawa Forest Reserve, Malawi	Crashed during landing due to pilot error; see 2024 Chikangawa Dornier 228 crash. Patricia Shanil Muluzi also died in this accident
Viktor Chistiakov	Soviet Union	1972	Actor, parodist	Aeroflot Flight 1491	Kharkiv, Soviet Union	Structural failure leading to a loss of control
Prince Christoph of Hesse	Germany	1943	Prince of Hesse, nephew of Wilhelm II	Siebel Fh 104 Hallore	Forlì, Italy	
Ted Christopher	United States	2017	American racing driver	Mooney M20-C	North Branford, Connecticut	Total loss of engine power due to fuel starvation as the result of foreign object debris in the fuel selector valve
Camilo Cienfuegos	Cuba	1959	Revolutionary	Cessna 310	Caribbean	Disappeared, body never recovered, presumed dead
Juan de la Cierva	Spain	1936	Inventor of the autogyro	KLM Douglas DC-2	Croydon Air Port, South London	Aircraft hit house after taking off in fog. Arvid Lindman was also killed.
Buddy Clark	United States	1949	Entertainer and singer	Cessna	Los Angeles, United States	Pilot error
Roberto Clemente	Puerto Rico	1972	Major League Baseball player	Douglas DC-7	off the coast of Isla Verde, Puerto Rico	Mechanical problems; overloaded plane
Patsy Cline	United States	1963	Entertainer and country singer	Piper Comanche	Camden, Tennessee, United States	Severe weather; Cowboy Copas and Hawkshaw Hawkins were also killed in this accident.
Robert Cocking	United Kingdom	1837	Watercolour artist and amateur scientist	Dihedral Parachute	Lee Green, England	Parachute broke up in mid-air after release from a balloon
Samuel Cody	United States	1913	Aviation pioneer and showman	Cody Floatplane	Farnborough, Hampshire, England	Aircraft broke up at 200 ft; thrown out of aircraft
Bessie Coleman	United States	1926	Aviator, first African-American woman pilot	Curtiss JN-4	Jacksonville, Florida, United States	Thrown from aircraft after controls jammed while she was riding as a passenger. She was not wearing a seatbelt.
Bob Collins	United States	2000	Entertainer, WGN (AM) radio personality	Zlín Z 42	Waukegan, Illinois, United States	Mid-air collision
George W. Collins	United States	1972	Politician, US Congressman from Illinois	United Air Lines Flight 553	Chicago, United States	Pilot error
Richard L. Conolly	United States	1962	United States Navy admiral	American Airlines Flight 1	Jamaica Bay, Queens, New York, United States	Loss of control at takeoff due to autopilot malfunction caused by electrical short
Maurice Connolly	United States	1921	Politician, former US Congressman from Iowa	Curtiss Eagle	Indian Head, Maryland, United States	Severe weather
Weldon B. Cooke	United States	1914	Aviator	Wright aircraft	Pueblo, Colorado, United States	
John Cooper	United Kingdom	1974	athlete, silver medalist at the 1964 Summer Olympics	Turkish Airlines Flight 981	Ermenonville, France	Cargo hatch and control cable failures
Cowboy Copas	United States	1963	Entertainer and country music singer	Piper Comanche	Camden, Tennessee, United States	Severe weather; Patsy Cline and Hawkshaw Hawkins were also killed in this accident.
Frank Eugene Corder	United States	1994		Cessna 150	Washington, D.C., United States	Intentionally crashed a stolen airplane on the White House lawn
Philippe Cousteau	France	1979	Oceanographer	PBY Catalina	Lisbon, Portugal	Nosed over during high-speed water taxi
Jacquie de Creed	United Kingdom	2011	Record breaking stunt performer	Piper PA-30 Twin Comanche	Mont Agel, France	Crashed while flying through dense fog at low altitude
Jim Croce	United States	1973	Entertainer and singer	Beechcraft Model 18	Natchitoches, Louisiana, United States	Collision with trees
Townsend Cromwell	United States	1958	Oceanographer	Aeroméxico Flight 111	Guadalajara, Mexico	Crashed into mountain
Hansie Cronje	South Africa	2002	Cricket captain	Hawker Siddeley HS 748	George, Western Cape, South Africa	Unserviceable navigational equipment
Albert Scott Crossfield	United States	2006	Test pilot	Cessna 210	Gordon County, Georgia, United States	Aircraft broke up in thunderstorm; ATC error; pilot error
Vicki Cruse	United States	2009	Stunt pilot	Zivko Edge 540	Silverstone Circuit, Northamptonshire, England	Crashed during competition aerobatics. Aircraft failed to recover from a downwards snap roll manoeuvre, causing it to rotate until it struck the ground.
Carlos Cruz	Dominican Republic	1970	World boxing champion	1970 Dominicana de Aviación DC-9 crash	Punta Caucedo	Fuel contamination
Rodney Culver	United States	1996	American National Football League player	ValuJet Flight 592	Florida Everglades, United States	Fire in-flight
Bronson M. Cutting	United States	1935	Politician, US Senator from New Mexico	TWA Douglas DC-2	Atlanta, Missouri, United States	Bad weather
Adelino Amaro da Costa	Portugal	1980	Politician, defense minister of Portugal	Cessna 421	Loures, Portugal	Sabotage
Marcel Dadi	France	1996	Entertainer and musician	TWA Flight 800	East Moriches, New York (8 mi E)	Mid-air explosion
Harold Edward Dahl	United States	1956	Aviator during the Spanish Civil War	Douglas DC-3	Canada	Severe weather
Steponas Darius	Lithuania	1933	Aviator	Lituanica	Pszczelnik, Myślibórz County, Poland	
Kenneth Davidson	United Kingdom	1954	Cricketer	Boeing 377	Prestwick, Scotland	
Donny Davies	United Kingdom	1958	Cricketer and journalist	Munich air disaster	Munich, West Germany	Failure to take off due to slush on runway
Olivier Dassault	France	2021	Billionaire and French MP	Eurocopter AS350 Écureuil	Deauville, Northwestern France	Under investigation; see 2021 Touques Airbus AS350B helicopter crash
Liam Davison	Australia	2014	Author	Malaysia Airlines Flight 17	Hrabove, Ukraine	Airliner shot down
Geoffrey de Havilland Jr.	United Kingdom	1946	Test pilot	de Havilland DH 108	Hoo Peninsula	Aircraft broke up while carrying out high-speed tests
John de Havilland	United Kingdom	1943	Test pilot	de Havilland Mosquito	Hatfield, England	Mid-air collision
Léon Delagrange	France	1910	Aviator and sculptor	Bleriot XI	Bordeaux, France	
Glen de Vries	United States	2021	Businessman and space tourist	Cessna 172	Hampton Township, New Jersey, United States	Crash in a heavily wooded area
B. H. DeLay	United States	1923	Stunt pilot, airport owner, aviation-school owner	the "Wasp"	Venice, Los Angeles, California, United States	Substandard wing pins
Glen Dell	South Africa	2013	Aviator	Extra EA-300	Secunda, Mpumalanga	Crashed during an airshow
John Denver	United States	1997	Entertainer, singer, songwriter, actor	Rutan Long-EZ	Pacific Grove, California, United States	Aircraft unfamiliarity; faulty assembly (deviation from original design)
Alison Des Forges	United States	2009	Human rights investigator and expert on the Rwandan genocide	Colgan Air Flight 3407	Clarence Center, New York	Icing, pilot error
Gabriel Diniz	Brazil	2019	Singer and songwriter	Piper PA-28 Cherokee	Estância, Sergipe, Brazil	Crashed in bad weather
Leila Diniz	Brazil	1972	Actress	Japan Air Lines Flight 471	New Delhi, India	Controlled flight into terrain
José Dolhem	France	1988	Racing car driver	Mitsubishi MU-2	Saint-Étienne, France	
Georg Donatus, Hereditary Grand Duke of Hesse	Germany	1937	Hereditary Grand Duke of Hesse	Junkers Ju 52	Ostend, Belgium	Crashed into a factory chimney; see 1937 Sabena Junkers Ju 52 Ostend crash
Jane Dornacker	United States	1986	Actress and radio station traffic reporter	Enstrom F-28	New York City	Main rotor seizure due to improper maintenance. Dornacker was live on the air for WNBC (AM) at the time of the crash.
Randy Dorton	United States	2004	Chief engine builder of Hendrick Motorsports	Beechcraft Super King Air 200	Martinsville, Virginia, United States	Pilot error. Several members of Hendrick family also died including Ricky Hendrick.
Jessica Dubroff	United States	1996	Aviator, 7-year-old aspiring pilot	Cessna 177	Cheyenne, Wyoming, United States	Aircraft lost control in thunderstorm; deliberate takeoff because of media commitments; pilot error
William Dyess	United States	1943	Aviator, United States Army Air Forces Lieutenant Colonel	Lockheed P-38 Lightning	Burbank, California, United States	Aircraft caught fire while on a training mission near highly populated Burbank, California. Instead of parachuting to safety, he remained at the controls and saved countless civilian lives by guiding it into a vacant lot.
Amelia Earhart	United States	1937	Aviator, pioneer woman pilot	Lockheed Model 10 Electra	Pacific Ocean, near Howland Island	Disappeared together with navigator Fred Noonan during global circumnavigation attempt, cause undetermined, body and aircraft never found; see speculation on Earhart's disappearance
Beverly Eckert	United States	2009	Activist, co-chair of the 9/11 Family Steering Committee	Colgan Air Flight 3407	Clarence Center, New York	Icing; pilot error
Glen Edwards	United States	1948	Test pilot, namesake of Edwards AFB	Northrop YB-49	Edwards Air Force Base, United States	Aircraft broke apart
Richard E. Ellsworth	United States	1953	Aviator, United States Air Force Brigadier General	Convair B-36	Trinity Bay, Newfoundland and Labrador	Controlled flight into terrain into a hill
Theodore G. Ellyson	United States	1928	First American naval aviator	Loening OL-7	Chesapeake Bay	
Eugene Ely	United States	1911	Aviator, pioneer pilot in American naval aviation	Curtiss Model D	Macon, Georgia, United States	Crashed while pulling from a dive.
Robert Henry English	United States	1943	Rear-Admiral, Commander, Submarines, U.S. Pacific Fleet	Pan Am Flight 1104	near Ukiah, California, United States	Pilot error
Harald Ertl	Austria	1982	Formula One racer	Beechcraft Bonanza	Niederweidbach, NW Giessen, Germany	Engine failure
José Félix Estigarribia	Paraguay	1940	President of Paraguay	Potez 25	Altos, Paraguay	
Philip Don Estridge	United States	1985	Project manager for IBM PC	Delta Air Lines Flight 191	Dallas/Fort Worth International Airport, United States	Microburst-induced wind shear
William Evans	United Kingdom	1913	Cricketer	Cody Floatplane	Farnborough, Hampshire, England	Aircraft broke up at 200 ft, thrown out of aircraft
John Fairey	United Kingdom	2009	Aisplay pilot	Percival Provost	Bishop Norton, Lincolnshire, England	
Igor Farkhutdinov	Russia	2003	Politician, governor of Sakhalin	Mil Mi-8	Petropavlovsk-Kamchatsky, Russia	Pilot error
Ferdinand Ferber	France	1909	Aviation pioneer	Voisin biplane	Boulogne-sur-Mer, France	Pilot error
Fernandão	Brazil	2014	Footballer	Helibras AS 350BA	Aruanã River, 9 miles from Aruanã, Goiás	Under investigation
Manuel J. "Pete" Fernandez	United States	1980	Aviator, ace pilot in the Korean War	Piper Geronimo	Grand Bahama Island	
Denys Finch Hatton	United Kingdom	1931	Game hunter	de Havilland Gypsy Moth	Voi, Kenya	
Ron Flockhart	United Kingdom	1962	Racing car driver, 24 Hours of Le Mans winner	CAC Mustang	Australia	Lost control in cloud
Cornelia Fort	United States	1943	First WAFS fatality	Vultee BT-13 Valiant	10 miles south of Merkel, Texas, United States	Mid-air collision
Steve Fossett	United States	2007	Entrepreneur, commodities trader	American Champion Decathlon	Sierra Nevada Mountains, United States	Pilot error following downdrafts resulting in Controlled flight into terrain
Jimmy Franklin	United States	2005	Aviator, aerobatic pilot	Waco UPF-7	Moose Jaw, Canada	Collision with Bobby Younkin
Arch Freeman	United States	1918	Pioneer aviator	Airco DH.4	Moraine, Ohio	Engine failure during takeoff
Winfried Freudenberg	East Germany	1989	Berlin Wall defectee	Homemade balloon	Zehlendorf, Berlin	Cause of crash unknown, fell into a garden of a villa in an attempt to defect to West Berlin.
Lucas Frota	Brazil	2026	Music producer	Bell 206	Rio de Janeiro, Brazil	Collided with another helicopter midair; see 2026 Rio de Janeiro mid-air collision. Oliver Tree, Gaspi and Lucas A. Vignale also died in this accident
Reinhard Furrer	Germany	1995	Scientist and astronaut	Messerschmitt Bf 108	Berlin	Lost control of aircraft
Yuri Gagarin	Soviet Union	1968	First man in space	Mikoyan-Gurevich MiG-15UTI	Kirzhach	Unknown
Sanjay Gandhi	India	1980	Son of Indira Gandhi	Pitts S-2A Special	Safdarjung Airport, New Delhi, India	Pilot error
Matthew Gannon	United States	1988	CIA Officer	Pan Am Flight 103	Lockerbie, Dumfries and Galloway, Scotland	Terrorist bomb
John Garang	Sudan	2005	Vice President of Sudan	Mil Mi-17	South Sudan	Controlled flight into terrain (mountains), disputed
Carlos Gardel	Argentina	1935	Singer	Ford Trimotor	Medellin, Colombia	SACO Trimotor collided with a Trimotor of SCADTA while preparing for takeoff
Gaspi	Argentina	2026	YouTuber, Internet personality and humourist	Bell 206	Rio de Janeiro, Brazil	Collided with another helicopter midair; see 2026 Rio de Janeiro mid-air collision. Oliver Tree, Lucas A. Vignale and Lucas Frota also died in this accident
Tom Gastall	United States	1956	Major League Baseball player	Ercoupe	Riviera Beach, Maryland	
Harold Geiger	United States	1927	Army Major, aviation pioneer, namesake of Geiger Field	Airco DH.4	Olmsted Field, Pennsylvania	
Bruce Geller	United States	1978	Producer and creator of Mission: Impossible	Cessna Skymaster	Santa Barbara, California	Weather conditions
Edward Gent	United Kingdom	1948	High Commissioner for the Federation of Malaya	Avro York	Northwood, London	1948 Northwood mid-air collision
Troy Gentry	United States	2017	Entertainer, country music singer and guitarist	Schweizer 269C	Medford, New Jersey	Uncontrolled descent during a power-off autorotation landing attempt; see 2017 Medford, New Jersey, helicopter crash
Prince George, Duke of Kent	United Kingdom	1942	Duke of Kent	Short Sunderland	Scotland	Controlled flight into terrain in bad weather
Abdul Rahim Ghafoorzai	Afghanistan	1997	Prime minister of the Northern Alliance government	Antonov An-32	Bamyan Province, Afghanistan	
Stasys Girėnas	Lithuania	1933	Aviator	Lituanica	Pszczelnik, Myślibórz County, Poland	
Jeremy Glick	United States	2001	Marketing executive	United Airlines Flight 93	Shanksville, Pennsylvania, United States	9/11 hijacking by Ziad Jarrah
Luis Gneiting	Paraguay	2018	Minister of Agriculture and Livestock of Paraguay	Beechcraft Baron	Ayolas, Paraguay	Aircraft crashed shortly after take-off
Cecil Grace	United Kingdom	1910	Aviator	Short S.27	English Channel	Disappeared, body never recovered, presumed dead
Rolls Gracie	Brazil	1982	Martial artist, practitioner of Brazilian Jiu-Jitsu	Hang glider	Mauá, São Paulo, Brazil	
Bill Graham	United States	1991	Rock concert promoter	Bell 206	Vallejo, California	Flew into power lines
Richard E. Gray	United States	1982	Aviator, test pilot	Cessna T-37 Tweet	Edwards Air Force Base	
Keith Green	United States	1982	Entertainer, contemporary Christian musician	Cessna 414	Lindale, Texas	Aircraft overloaded
Isaac Grünewald	Sweden	1946	Expressionist painter, modernist	Junkers Ju 52	Oslo, Norway	
Michael Grzimek	West Germany	1959	Zoologist	Dornier Do 27	Serengeti, Tanzania	Collision with vulture
Prince Gustaf Adolf, Duke of Västerbotten	Sweden	1947	Swedish Prince, Duke of Västerbotten	Douglas DC-3	Kastrup, Denmark	Locked elevator, pilot error
Werner Haas	Germany	1956	Motorcycle racer	Jodel D9 Bebe	near Neuburg/Donau, Germany	
Juvénal Habyarimana	Rwanda	1994	President of Rwanda	Dassault Falcon 50	Kigali, Rwanda	Aircraft shot down by unknown assassins; Burundian president Cyprien Ntaryamira and 10 others also killed
Mohammed Ali Ahmed al-Haddad	Libya	2025	Chief of the General Staff of the Libyan Army	Dassault Falcon 50	Near Haymana, Turkey	Under investigation; see Harmony Jets Flight 185
Roy Halladay	United States	2017	Baseball player	ICON A5	Gulf of Mexico	
Gustav Hamel	United Kingdom	1914	Aviator	Morane-Saulnier	English Channel	Unknown. His body was found in the sea five weeks later, but it was not recovered
A. P. Hamann	United States	1977	City Manager of San Jose, California	Tenerife airport disaster	Canary Islands, Spain	Airplane collision
Frederick Hamilton-Temple-Blackwood, 3rd Marquess of Dufferin and Ava	United Kingdom	1932	Soldier and politician	Junkers F13	Meopham, Kent, United Kingdom	Structural failure
Dag Hammarskjöld	Sweden	1961	Secretary-General of the United Nations 1953–1961	Douglas DC-6B	Ndola, Rhodesia and Nyasaland	Crashed into terrain, cause undetermined, possibly pilot error or external attack; see 1961 Ndola Transair Sweden DC-6 crash
Wal Handley	United Kingdom	1941	Motorcycle racer	Bell P-39 Airacobra	Kirkbampton, Cumberland, England	
Laurence G. Hanscom	United States	1941	Journalist and aviator	Single-motor biplane	Saugus, Massachusetts	Crashed while performing stunts
Jim Hardin	United States	1991	Major League Baseball player	Beechcraft Bonanza	Key West, Florida	Propeller failure
Matthew Harding	United Kingdom	1996	Vice-chairman of Chelsea Football Club	Aerospatiale AS355 F1 Squirrel	Middlewich, Cheshire, England	Pilot error
Charles Hardy	Australia	1941	Senator	Airlines of Australia de Havilland Puss Moth	Coen River, Australia	Mechanical fault
Raymond Harries	United Kingdom	1950	Second World War fighter ace	Gloster Meteor	Near Sheffield, Yorkshire, England	Fuel exhaustion
Barbara Jane Harrison	United Kingdom	1968	Air stewardess	Boeing 707	Heathrow Airport, London	Awarded George Cross for her actions during the fire that befell BOAC Flight 712
Charles Hawker	Australia	1938	Cabinet minister	Australian National Airways Kyeema	Mount Dandenong (Victoria), Australia	Pilot error; 18 fatalities
Harry Hawker	Australia	1921	Aviator, pioneer and co-founder of Hawker Aircraft	Nieuport Goshawk	Hendon Aerodrome, Hendon, north London, England	Distraction of a hemorrhage while in flight cause a crash.
Hawkshaw Hawkins	United States	1963	Entertainer, country music singer	Piper Comanche	Camden, Tennessee	crashed in bad weather; Patsy Cline and Cowboy Copas were also killed in this accident.
John Heinz	United States	1991	US Senator	Piper Aerostar	Lower Merion Township, Pennsylvania	Collided with Bell 412 during aerial landing gear inspection; see 1991 Merion mid-air collision
Cheryll Heinze	United States	2012	State legislator from Alaska	Cessna 206	in Beluga Lake, Alaska near Homer Airport	Plane flipped upon landing
Brenda Hean	Australia	1972	Environmental activist	de Havilland Tiger Moth	en route from Tasmania to Canberra	Vanished
Mack Hellings	United States	1951	Racing driver	Piper PA-20 Pacer	Kern County, California	
Ricky Hendrick	United States	2004	Racing driver, son of Rick Hendrick and owner of Hendrick Motorsports	Beechcraft Super King Air 200	Martinsville, Virginia	Pilot error. Several members of the Hendrick family and Randy Dorton also died in the crash.
Eric Hertz	New Zealand	2013	Business executive at telecom company 2degrees	Beechcraft Baron	Tasman Sea off Kawhia Harbour	Airspeed decayed for undetermined reasons and aircraft entered a spin
Bonny Hicks	Singapore	1997	Model, writer	SilkAir Flight 185; Boeing 737	Palembang, Indonesia	Crashed during flight
Graham Hill	United Kingdom	1975	F1 racing driver	Piper PA 23-250 Turbo-Aztec	Near Arkley golf course, North London	See Graham Hill plane crash. Hit trees when coming in to land due to fog.
James DeWitt Hill	United States	1927	Aviator	Old Glory	North Atlantic	Aircraft crashed during an attempt at a transatlantic flight from the United States to Italy.
Ployer Peter Hill	United States	1935	Test pilot	Boeing Model 299	Wright Field, Ohio	Failure to remove gust locks before flight. Les Tower also died in this crash.
Larry Hillblom	United States	1995	Business executive, founder of DHL Express	Republic RC-3 Seabee	Saipan	Disappeared
John Stuart Hindmarsh	United Kingdom	1938	Racecar driver and aviator, Le Mans 24 Hours winner	Hawker Hurricane I	St. George's Hill, Weybridge	aircraft failed to recover from dive, possible carbon monoxide poisoning of pilot
Bert Hinkler	Australia	1933	Aviator	de Havilland Puss Moth	Pratomagno Alps in Italy	
Steve Hislop	United Kingdom	2003	Motorcycle racer, Isle of Man TT winner	Robinson R44	Hawick, Scotland	Crashed after the main rotor struck the tailboom, causing it to detach, probably caused by excessively low rotor RPM
Tommy Hitchcock Jr.	United States	1944	Polo player	North American P-51 Mustang	Salisbury, Wiltshire, England	Aircraft failed to recover from dive
Al Holbert	United States	1988	Racing driver, 24 Hours of Le Mans winner	Piper Aerostar 601P	Ohio State University Airport, Columbus, Ohio	Lost control after takeoff with one half of two-part entry door open
Buddy Holly	United States	1959	Singer-songwriter	Beechcraft Bonanza	Clear Lake, IA	Pilot error continued VFR into IMC; J.P. "The Big Bopper" Richardson and Ritchie Valens were also killed in this accident (see The Day the Music Died).
Saul Horowitz Jr.	United States	1975	Construction company executive	Eastern Air Lines Flight 66	John F. Kennedy International Airport, Jamaica, Queens, New York, United States	Wind shear stemming from a microburst
James Horner	United States	2015	Film score composer	Short Tucano	Los Padres National Forest, California	Under investigation
István Horthy	Hungary	1942	Deputy Regent of Hungary	MÁVAG Héja	Ilovskoye, Soviet Union	Aircraft stalled and crashed
Leslie Howard	Great Britain	1943	English stage and screen actor	KLM Royal Dutch Airlines/BOAC Flight 777/Douglas DC-3	Commercial flight from Portugal to England, shot down in Bay of Biscay by Luftwaffe	All 17 passengers and crew killed
Ken Hubbs	United States	1964	Major League Baseball player	Cessna 172	Provo, Utah	Continued VFR into IMC
Gary Hubler	United States	2007	Aviator and aircraft racer	Tuttle Cassutt IIIM (modified)	Reno, Nevada	Collision with another airplane during the Reno Air Races Formula One race
Viera Husáková	Czechoslovakia	1977	First lady of Czechoslovakia	Mil Mi-8	Bratislava Airport, Czechoslovakia (now Slovakia)	Pilot error, insufficient orientation during a landing attempt in a dense fog
Steven F. Hyde	United States	1989	CEO of Trump Casino	Agusta 109A helicopter	Forked River, New Jersey	Helicopter crashed when overhead and tail rotors broke off from the craft; also killed were fellow Trump Casino executives Mark Grossinger Ettes and Jonathan Benanav. Company founder (and future U.S. president) Donald Trump was reportedly scheduled to go with them on the flight, but cancelled at the last minute.
Jorge Ibargüengoitia	Mexico	1983	Novelist and playwright	Avianca Flight 011	Madrid, Spain	Improper navigation during approach
Pedro Infante	Mexico	1957	Entertainer, singer and actor	Consolidated B-24 Liberator	Mérida, Yucatán, Mexico	
Guy Jackson	Ireland	1972	Tennis player	British European Airways Flight 548	Staines-upon-Thames, England	Pilot error
Junaid Jamshed	Pakistan	2016	Singer	Pakistan International Airlines Flight 661	Havelian, Pakistan	Engine failure
Anna Jantar	Poland	1980	Entertainer, singer	LOT Polish Airlines Flight 007	Warsaw, Poland	Struck trees during landing go around
Shuba Jay	Malaysia	2014	Actress	Malaysia Airlines Flight 17	Hrabove, Ukraine	Airliner shootdown
Jayan	India	1980	Entertainer, Malayalam film actor	Bell 47	Sholavaram, Tamil Nadu	Accident while performing a film stunt
Paul Jeffreys	United Kingdom	1988	Musician	Pan Am Flight 103	Lockerbie, Scotland	Terrorism
Alex Johnson	United Kingdom	1944	Footballer	Douglas C-47 Skytrain	near Salalah, Oman	Crashed into a mountain due to a Controlled flight into a mountain.
Amy Johnson	United Kingdom	1941	Aviator, pioneer woman pilot	Airspeed Oxford	Thames Estuary	Fuel exhaustion while ferrying aircraft due to 100% cloud cover at destination. Pilot abandoned aircraft over water and succumbed to hypothermia before rescue
Jed Johnson	United States	1996	Designer	TWA Flight 800	East Moriches, New York (8 mi E)	Mid-air explosion
Martin Johnson	United States	1937	Adventurer and film producer	Western Air Express Flight 7	near Saugus, California	Controlled flight into terrain into mountainous terrain
Ralph Johnstone	United States	1910	Aviator, first American pilot fatality	Wright Model B	Denver, Colorado	Crashed on 17 November 1910
Charles Edward Jones	United States	2001	Astronaut	American Airlines Flight 11	World Trade Center North Tower, New York City	9/11 hijacking by Mohamed Atta
Lech Kaczyński	Poland	2010	President of Poland	Polish Air Force Tupolev Tu-154	Smolensk North Airport, Russia	Officially attributed to controlled flight into terrain due to pilot error, but official findings are disputed; see Smolensk air disaster
Gunnar Källén	Sweden	1968	Theoretical physicist, professor	Cessna	Hanover, Germany	Private plane
Otto Kalvitsa	Finland	1930	Aviator, polar explorer	Junkers W 33	Sangar, Soviet Union	Finnish-born Soviet aviator who crashed in a heavy snow storm
Ahmed Kandil	Egypt	1950	Swimmer	Spitfire	Port Said, Egypt	Egyptian swimmer who was killed in a plane crash while serving with the Egyptian Air Force when his Spitfire collided in mid-air with another Spitfire over Port Said.
Paris Kanellakis	Greece	1995	Computer scientist, professor	American Airlines Flight 965	Buga, Colombia	Navigational errors by flight crew
William Kapell	United States	1953	Classical pianist	BCPA Flight 304	near Woodside, California	Controlled flight into terrain into mountainous terrain
Rashid Karami	Lebanon	1987	Prime Minister of Lebanon	Aérospatiale Puma	Lebanon	Bomb
Will Kirk Kaynor	United States	1929	US Congressman from Massachusetts	Fokker F.VII	Bolling Field near Washington, D.C.	
George E. M. Kelly	United States	1911	Fourth American pilot killed, second in a military aircraft	Curtiss Model D	San Antonio, Texas	Aviator. Crashed from broken strut.
Byron Kennedy	Australia	1983	Film director	Bell 206B JetRanger	Warragamba Dam, New South Wales, Australia	Helicopter was flying at 10-foot when it hit the water with the rear of the skids when it attempted to climb, pilot error.
John F. Kennedy Jr.	United States	1999	Son of John F. Kennedy	Piper PA-32R	Atlantic Ocean off Martha's Vineyard	Pilot error; see John F. Kennedy Jr. plane crash
Joseph P. Kennedy Jr.	United States	1944	Older brother of John F. Kennedy	Consolidated B-24 Liberator modified as a flying bomb	near Blythburgh, Suffolk, England	Killed on a combat flight during Operation Aphrodite
Dorjee Khandu	India	2011	Chief Minister of Arunachal Pradesh	Eurocopter	Lobotang, Arunachal Pradesh, India	Poor Condition of the Helicopter.
Iven Carl Kincheloe Jr.	United States	1958	Korean War ace pilot and test pilot	Lockheed F-104 Starfighter	Edwards Air Force Base	
Charles Kingsford Smith	Australia	1935	Aviator	Lockheed Altair	Andaman Sea	Disappeared during an England to Australia record flight attempt, body never recovered, presumed dead.
Nile Kinnick	United States	1943	American football player; winner of the 1939 Heisman Trophy	Grumman F4F Wildcat	Caribbean	Training accident
Florence Klingensmith	United States	1933	Aviator	Gee Bee Model Y Senior Sportster	National Air Races, Chicago, Illinois	Parachute fouled in fuselage during bail out after plane started breaking up.
Gary Knopp	United States	2020	Alaska State Representative	Piper PA-12 Super Cruiser	Kenai Peninsula, Alaska	Collision with de Havilland Canada DHC-2 Beaver, cause attributed to both pilots filing to comply with the see and avoid rule; see 2020 Alaska mid-air collision
Mineichi Koga	Japan	1944	Admiral, Commander-in-Chief of Combined Fleet	Kawanishi H8K	Philippine Sea between Davao and Palau	Aircraft disappeared in typhoon
Giannos Kranidiotis	Greece	1999	Diplomat and politician	Dassault Falcon 900	Romania	
Robert Kronfeld	Austria	1948	Gliding champion and test pilot	General Aircraft GAL.56	Hampshire, England, United Kingdom	Aircraft failed to recover from inverted dive during stall tests, observer bailed out at low altitude but pilot was unable to exit aircraft
Alan Kulwicki	United States	1993	NASCAR driver	Fairchild Merlin IIIC	Tri-Cities Regional Airport, Blountville, Tennessee	Engine failure due to ice accumulation
Wendell Ladner	United States	1975	ABA basketball player	Eastern Air Lines Flight 66	John F. Kennedy International Airport, Queens, New York	Windshear
Joseph LaMotta	United States	1998	Chef, son of Jake LaMotta	Swissair Flight 111	Atlantic Ocean southwest of Halifax International Airport, Nova Scotia, Canada	In-flight fire caused by faulty wiring of entertainment system
Joep Lange	Netherlands	2014	President of the International AIDS Society	Malaysia Airlines Flight 17	Hrabove, Ukraine	Airliner shootdown
Gwen Shamblin Lara	United States	2021	Author, dietitian and church founder	Cessna Citation I/SP	Percy Priest Lake, Tennessee	Loss of control in low visibility; husband Joe Lara also died in this accident; see 2021 Percy Priest Lake Cessna Citation crash
Joe Lara	United States	2021	Actor, martial artist and musician	Cessna Citation I/SP	Percy Priest Lake, Tennessee	Loss of control in low visibility; wife Gwen Shamblin Lara also died in this accident; see 2021 Percy Priest Lake Cessna Citation crash
Eugène Lefebvre	France	1909	First person to die while piloting a powered airplane and the second person to be killed in an airplane crash	Wright Model A	Port-Aviation ("Juvisy Airfield"), Viry-Châtillon, France	Crashed from 20 feet (6.1 m)
Raymonde de Laroche	France	1919	First woman to earn a pilot's license	experimental Caudron	Le Crotoy, France	
Leif Holger Larsen	Norway	2015	Diplomat	Mil Mi-17	Naltar Valley, Pakistan	Loss of control due to mechanical failure
Guadalupe Larriva	Ecuador	2007	Defence minister of Ecuador	Aérospatiale Gazelle	Manta Air Base, Ecuador	Collision with another Gazelle during a night training flight
Alexander Lebed	Russia	2002	Presidential candidate, governor of Krasnoyarsk	Mil Mi-8	Yermakovsky District, Russia	Pilot error, foggy weather
Mickey Leland	United States	1989	US Congressman from Texas	de Havilland Canada DHC-6 Twin Otter	Gambela Region, Ethiopia	
Tony Lema	United States	1966	Champion golfer	Beechcraft Twin Bonanza	near Munster, Indiana	Fuel starvation
Léon Lemartin	France	1911	Aviator	Bleriot XI	Paris, France	Crashed on 18 June 1911 in Paris to London air race.
Léon Letort	France	1913	Aviator	Bleriot XI	Barbezieux-Saint-Hilaire aerodrome	Crashed on 10 December 1913 in Paris-Bordeaux-Paris air race
Jim LeRoy	United States	2007	Stunt performer Bulldog Airshows	Pitts Special	Dayton International Airport	Failed recovery during airshow maneuver
Daniel Lewin	United States	2001	Founder and CTO of Akamai	American Airlines Flight 11	World Trade Center North Tower, New York City	Stabbed above around Massachusetts and New York during hijacking
Cory Lidle	United States	2006	Major League Baseball player	Cirrus SR20	New York City	pilot error; Controlled flight into terrain
Otto Lilienthal	Germany	1896	Glider pioneer	Lilienthal Normalsegelapparat	Stölln, Havelland, Brandenburg, Germany	wing stall
Lin Biao	China	1971	Military commander	Hawker Siddeley Trident	Öndörkhaan, Mongolia	fleeing a coup attempt
Arvid Lindman	Sweden	1936	Former Prime Minister of Sweden	KLM Douglas DC-2	Croydon Air Port, South London	aircraft hit house after taking off in fog; Juan de la Cierva also killed
Jerry Litton	United States	1976	U.S. Representative from Missouri	Beechcraft Baron	Chillicothe, Missouri	Engine failure during takeoff
Ormer Locklear	United States	1920	Aerobatic and stunt performer	Curtiss "Jenny"	Los Angeles, California	during filming of The Skywayman
Carole Lombard	United States	1942	Actress	TWA Flight 3 Douglas DC-3	Mount Potosi, Nevada, United States	Controlled flight into terrain
Alfred Loewenstein	Belgium	1928	Entrepreneur and financier	Fokker F.VII	Fell from his plane over the English Channel	
Domingo Lucenario Jr.	Philippines	2015	Diplomat	Mil Mi-17	Naltar Valley, Pakistan	loss of control due to mechanical failure
Einar Lundborg	Sweden	1931	Aviator	Svenska Aero Jaktfalken	Malmslätt, Sweden	test flight
Ernest Lundeen	United States	1940	US Senator from Minnesota	Pennsylvania Central Airlines Flight 19	Lovettsville, Virginia	lightning strike
Pam Lychner	United States	1996	Real estate agent & sex offender activist	TWA Flight 800	Atlantic Ocean near East Moriches, New York	mid-air explosion
Nancy Lynn	United States	2006	Eerobatic pilot and flight instructor	Extra EA-300	Culpeper Regional Airport, Culpeper, Virginia	Disorientation while performing an aerobatic maneuver, which resulted in the airplane's inadvertent impact with the ground. Contributing to the accident was the pilot's overuse of prescription medication.
Muhammadu Maccido	Nigeria	2006	The 19th Sultan of Sokoto	ADC Airlines Flight 053; Boeing 737	Abuja, Nigeria	cause disputed
Samora Machel	Mozambique	1986	President of Mozambique	Tupolev Tu-134	Mbuzini, Lebombo Mountains, South Africa	Controlled flight into terrain during an instrument approach
Elsie Mackay	United Kingdom	1928	Socialite and Trans-Atlantic pioneer	Stinson Detroiter	Mid-Atlantic	Disappeared without trace over the Atlantic
Alejandro Maclean	Spain	2010	Stunt pilot, Red Bull Air Race competitor	Edge 540	Casarrubios del Monte, Province of Toledo	Crashed into the ground during stunt routine
Mitsuyasu Maeno	Japan	1976	Erotic film actor	Piper Cherokee	Setagaya, Tokyo	Controlled flight into terrain into a house during a kamikaze attack
John Gillespie Magee Jr.	United States	1941	Aviator and poet	Supermarine Spitfire V AD291	Roxholm, England	collision with an Airspeed Oxford
Ramon Magsaysay	Philippines	1957	President of the Philippines	Presidential plane crash, "Mt. Pinatubo"	Mount Manunggal, Cebu, Philippines	
Jonathan Mann	United States	1998	AIDS researcher and WHO official	Swissair Flight 111	Atlantic Ocean southwest of Halifax International Airport, Nova Scotia, Canada	In-flight fire caused by faulty wiring of entertainment system
Paul Mantz	United States	1965	Racing and stunt pilot	Phoenix P-1	Winterhaven, California	during filming of The Flight of the Phoenix
Rocky Marciano	United States	1969	Former world boxing champion	Cessna 172	Newton, Iowa	not qualified to fly on instruments
Christophe de Margerie	France	2014	CEO of Total S.A.	Dassault Falcon 50	Moscow, Russia	Collided on take-off with a snow plow that had strayed onto the runway
Dean Paul Martin	United States	1987	Actor, singer and son of Dean Martin	McDonnell Douglas F-4 Phantom II	San Bernardino Mountains. California	During maneuvers with his Air Force Reserve unit
Eduardo Mata	Mexico	1995	Orchestra conductor and composer.	Piper Aerostar	Toluca, Mexico	Aircraft crashed after entering a stall while attempting emergency landing
Enrico Mattei	Italy	1962	President of Eni	Morane-Saulnier MS.760 Paris	Bascapè, Italy	Crashed during stormy weather on approach to the Linate Airport. Unsubstantiated reports of a bomb explosion.
Belvin Maynard	United States	1922	Pioneer aviator		Rutland, Vermont, United States	Nosedived while attempting a tailspin at a low altitude during a flying exhibition
Joseph C. McConnell	United States	1954	Korean War ace pilot	F-86H Sabre	Edwards Air Force Base	control malfunction attributed to a missing bolt
James McCudden	United Kingdom	1918	World War I fighter ace	Royal Aircraft Factory SE.5a	Auxi-le-Château, France	Engine malfunction on takeoff
Larry McDonald	United States	1983	Congressman from Georgia	Korean Air Lines Flight 007	Near Moneron Island, Soviet Union	Shot down by Soviet air force
Jack McGee	United States	1918	Aviator	Gallaudette Hydroplane	Greenwich Bay	Pontoon dipped into the water, causing his plane to topple into the water where he drowned.
Colin McRae	United Kingdom	2007	Scottish rally driver	Eurocopter AS350	Lanark, Scotland	Pilot error
Marília Mendonça	Brazil	2021	Singer	2021 Piedade de Caratinga Beechcraft King Air crash	Piedade de Caratinga, Brazil	Under investigation
Alan P. Merriam	United States	1980	Ethnomusicologist	LOT Polish Airlines Flight 007	Warsaw, Poland	loss of control due to fire caused by disintegrating turbine disc
Eve Meyer	United States	1977	Actress, Playboy centerfold June 1955	Tenerife airport disaster; Boeing 747-100	Tenerife, Canary Islands, Spain	runway collision
George S. Mickelson	United States	1993	Governor of South Dakota	Mitsubishi MU-2B-60	Dubuque, Iowa	metal fatigue of propeller hub caused by improper design and manufacturing
Glenn Miller	United States	1944	Musician, Big Band leader	Noorduyn Norseman	English Channel	disappeared, body never recovered, presumed dead
Vittorio Missoni	Italy	2013	CEO of Missoni	Britten-Norman Islander	Los Roques, Venezuela	Unknown, under investigation
John Purroy Mitchel	United States	1918	Former Mayor of New York City	Thomas-Morse S-4	Lake Charles, Louisiana	Fell from airplane from not wearing a seatbelt; namesake of the former Mitchel Air Force Base.
Lydia Möcklinghoff	Germany	2026	Zoologist	Neiva-built EMB-810D	near Campo Grande, Brazil	Plane crashed in dense fog.
William A. Moffett	United States	1933	U.S. Navy rear admiral	USS Akron (ZRS-4)	Atlantic Ocean off New Jersey	Dirigible crashed and sank in storm
Emilio Mola	Spain	1937	Nationalist General	Airspeed Envoy	Spain	Flew into mountain
Werner Mölders	Germany	1941	Leading Luftwaffe fighter ace	Heinkel He 111	Breslau, Germany	Passenger aboard aircraft that crashed while landing in thunderstorm
John Joseph Montgomery	United States	1911	Inventor, Aviator	Evergreen monoplane glider	San Jose, California, United States	turbulence, which caused a stall.
Grace Moore	United States	1947	Opera singer	Douglas DC-3	Kastrup, Denmark	locked elevator, pilot error
Joaquín García Morato	Spain	1939	Top fighter ace of Spanish Civil War	Fiat CR.32	Spain	Crashed during low-level aerobatic demonstration for newsreel cameras
Paul Morgan	United Kingdom	2001	Racing car engineer and co-founder of Ilmor Engineering	Hawker Sea Fury	Sywell, England	overturned on landing
deLesseps Story Morrison	United States	1964	Former Mayor of New Orleans	Piper PA-23 Registration: N5211Y	Ciudad Victoria, Mexico	
Vic Morrow	United States	1982	Actor	Bell UH-1 Iroquois	Ventura County, California, between Santa Clarita and Piru	Helicopter crashed on top of him after special effects explosion damaged its tail rotor during filming of Twilight Zone: The Movie
Juan Camilo Mouriño	Mexico	2008	Secretary of the Interior (Mexico)	Learjet 45	Mexico City, Mexico	
Camille Muffat	France	2015	Swimmer; Olympic gold medalist	Eurocopter AS350	Villa Castelli, Argentina	collided in mid-air; see 2015 Villa Castelli mid-air collision
Kuniko Mukōda	Japan	1981	Writer, mainly television drama	Far Eastern Air Transport Flight 103	94 miles (151 km) south of Taipei, Taiwan	Fuselage structure failure caused by corrosion
Patricia Shanil Muluzi	Malawi	2024	Former First Lady of Malawi	Dornier 228	Chikangawa Forest Reserve, Malawi	Crashed during landing due to pilot error; see 2024 Chikangawa Dornier 228 crash. Saulos Chilima also died in this accident
Thurman Munson	United States	1979	Major League Baseball player	Cessna Citation I/SP	Akron, Ohio	Pilot error
Audie Murphy	United States	1971	Medal of Honor recipient and actor	Aero Commander 680	Catawba, Virginia	Controlled flight into terrain – Flew into clouds while using visual flight rules.
Vadim Naumov	Russia	2025	Pair skater	Bombardier CRJ701ER	Potomac River, Washington, D.C., United States	Federal Aviation Administration (FAA) route design and oversight failures; see 2025 Potomac River mid-air collision. His wife Evgenia Shishkova also died in this accident
Fatma Ceren Necipoğlu	Turkey	2009	Harpist	Air France Flight 447	Atlantic Ocean	controlled stalled flight into sea at night due to icing leading to pilot error
Ricky Nelson	United States	1985	Actor and singer	Douglas DC-3	De Kalb, Texas	Crashed into trees and utility poles during emergency landing attempt prompted by dense cabin smoke of undetermined origin
Gerda Neumann	Denmark	1947	Singer and actress	Douglas DC-3	Kastrup, Denmark	Locked elevator, pilot error
Ginette Neveu	France	1949	Classical violinist	Lockheed Constellation	São Miguel Island, Azores, Portugal	Controlled flight into terrain: mountain
Charles Franklin Niles	United States	1916	Pioneer aviator	Moisant monoplane	Fairgrounds Oshkosh, Wisconsin	Crashed while performing a loop 25 June 1916; died of injuries 26 June 1916
Iveson B. Noland	United States	1975	Episcopal prelate, Bishop of Louisiana	Eastern Air Lines Flight 66	John F. Kennedy International Airport, Jamaica, Queens, New York, United States	Wind shear stemming from a microburst
Fred Noonan	United States	1937	Pioneering flight navigator	Lockheed Model 10 Electra	Pacific Ocean, near Howland Island	Disappeared together with pilot Amelia Earhart during global circumnavigation attempt, cause undetermined, body and aircraft never found; see speculation on Earhart's disappearance
Grant Notley	Canada	1984	Politician, leader of the opposition in Alberta	Piper Navajo Chieftain	High Prairie, Alberta, Canada	
Cyprien Ntaryamira	Burundi	1994	President of Burundi	Dassault Falcon 50	Kigali, Rwanda	Aircraft shot down by unknown assassins; Rwandan president Juvénal Habyarimana and 10 others also killed
Grady Nutt	United States	1982	Minister and Christian comedian	Beechcraft Baron 55	Cullman, Alabama	cause of crash undetermined, weather (fog and rain) considered factors
Donald Grant Nutter	United States	1962	Governor of Montana	Douglas C-47 Skytrain	Wolf Creek, Montana	crashed during snow storm
Charles Nungesser	France	1927	World War I flying ace	Levasseur PL.8	North Atlantic Ocean	Disappeared, body never recovered, presumed dead
Tengku Rizal Nurdin	Indonesia	2005	Governor of North Sumatra	Mandala Airlines Flight 091	Medan, Indonesia	crashed upon takeoff
Barbara Olson	United States	2001	Lawyer and commentator	American Airlines Flight 77	The Pentagon, Arlington, Virginia	hijacking by Hani Hanjour
Jerome F. O'Malley	United States	1985	Military general, commander of U.S. Air Force Tactical Air Command	North American CT-39A Sabreliner	Wilkes-Barre/Scranton International Airport, Pennsylvania	runway overrun caused by faulty brakes
Rudy Ortiz	Guatemala	2014	Military officer, head of the military	Bell 206	El Aguacate, Nentón, Huehuetenango Department	
Rafael Osuna	Mexico	1969	Tennis player	Mexicana de Aviación Flight 704	Salinas Victoria, Mexico	hit mountain during approach to land
Renny Ottolina	Venezuela	1978	TV producer and entertainer	Cessna 310	Maiquetía, Venezuela	disappeared, was a presidential candidate at the time.
Robert Overmyer	United States	1996	NASA astronaut, test pilot	Cirrus VK-30	Duluth, Minnesota, United States	wing stall during full-flap stall testing
Carlos Pace	Brazil	1977	Formula One driver	Piper	Mairiporã	Controlled flight into terrain, weather-related
Ali Reza Pahlavi	Iran	1954	Iranian Prince	Beechcraft B35 Bonanza (registration EP-AAI)	Alborz Mountains, Iran	
Park Kyung-won	Korea	1933	One of earliest Korean female aviators	Salmson 2A2	Hakone, Japan	fog
Gordon Parks Jr.	United States	1979	Film director	small private plane	Nairobi, Kenya	Crashed after takeoff.
Al Passarell	Canada	1986	Politician	DeHavilland Beaver	near Dease Lake, British Columbia	passenger in float-equipped DHC Beaver that crashed in lake during attempt to land in glassy water conditions
Ajit Pawar	India	2026	Politician	2026 Baramati Learjet 45 crash	Baramati Airport, Baramati, Pune district, Maharashtra, India	Loss of control, under investigation
Pedro Luiz	Brazil – Belgium	2009	Third in succession to the now extinct throne of Brazil	Air France Flight 447	Atlantic Ocean	Pitot tube icing; pilots, confused by inconsistent air data, stalled the aircraft
John-Olof Persson	Sweden	1989	Former Mayor of Stockholm	Beechcraft Model 99	Oskarshamn, Sweden	Flygolyckan i Oskarshamn 1989 (crash info in Swedish)
Dan Petrescu	Romania	2021	Romanian businessman and billionaire, one of the richest persons in Romania at the time	Pilatus PC-12	Milan, Italy	2021 Milan airplane crash
Vladimir Pettay	Russia	2011	Russian international football referee	RusAir Flight 9605	Republic of Karelia, Russia	Controlled flight into terrain
Jerry Pettis	United States	1975	Representative from California	Beech Bonanza	Banning, California	Flew into obscured pass at low altitude.
Jean-François Pilâtre de Rozier	France	1785	Hot air ballooning pioneer	Hot air balloon	Wimille	Crashed in an attempt to fly across the English Channel
Percy Pilcher	United Kingdom	1899	Inventor and aviation pioneer	Glider The Hawk	Market Harborough, Leicestershire, England	Structural failure; tail detached from glider
Sebastián Piñera	Chile	2024	Former President of Chile	Robinson R44	Lake Ranco	Crashed into lake
Lionel Poilâne	France	2002	Baker and entrepreneur	Agusta A109	off Cancale	crashed in sea during attempt to land on island off the coast in fog
Wiley Post	United States	1935	Aviation pioneer	Lockheed Model 9 Orion (modified)	Walakpa Bay near Barrow, Alaska	engine failure; killed in the same crash as Will Rogers
Francis Gary Powers	United States	1977	1960 U-2 incident pilot	Bell 206 Jet-Ranger (KNBC News Helicopter) (modified)	Los Angeles, CA	pilot error and fuel starvation
Jim Prentice	Canada	2016	Former Premier of Alberta	Cessna Citation	Lake Country, British Columbia, Canada	Aircraft crashed shortly after take-off
Yevgeny Prigozhin	Russia	2023	Russian oligarch and founder of Wagner Group	Embraer Legacy 600	Kuzhenkino, Tver Oblast, Russia	Under Investigation; see 2023 Wagner Group plane crash
David Purley	United Kingdom	1985	Formula One driver	Pitts Special	The sea off Bognor Regis, West Sussex, England	
Harald Quandt	West Germany	1967	Industrialist	Beechcraft King Air	Italy	
Edson Queiroz	Brazil	1982	Entrepreneur	VASP Flight 168	Serra da Aratanha, near Pacatuba, Ceará, Brazil	
Harriet Quimby	United States	1912	First licensed female pilot in the U.S.	Blériot two seater	Squantum, Massachusetts	Fell from airplane from not wearing a seatbelt
Maria Radner	Germany	2015	Opera singer	Germanwings Flight 9525	Prads-Haute-Bléone, Alpes-de-Haute-Provence, France	Co-pilot committed murder–suicide by deliberately crashing the plane, killing all 150 passengers. Her colleague Oleg Bryjak was also on board.
Ralph Rainger	United States	1942	Composer and songwriter	Douglas DC-3 – American Airlines Flight 28	Chino Canyon, Riverside County, California, United States	mid-air collision
Ebrahim Raisi	Iran	2024	President of Iran	Bell 212	Varzaqan, East Azerbaijan Province, Iran	See: 2024 Varzaqan helicopter crash
Ángel Rama	Uruguay	1983	Writer, academic, and literary critic	Avianca Flight 011, Boeing 747	near Madrid, Spain	Controlled flight into terrain
Bipin Rawat	India	2021	Chief of Defence Staff (CDS) of the Indian Armed Forces	Mil Mi-17	Coonoor taluk, Nilgiris district.	2021 Indian Air Force Mil Mi-17 crash
Otis Redding	United States	1967	Singer-songwriter	Beechcraft Model 18	Lake Monona, Madison, Wisconsin, United States	
Y. S. Rajasekhara Reddy	India	2009	Chief Minister of Andhra Pradesh, India	Bell 430	Nallamala, India	
Jim Reeves	United States	1964	Country music singer	Beechcraft Debonair	Brentwood, Tennessee, United States	
Bo Rein	United States	1980	LSU Tigers college football coach	Cessna 441	Atlantic Ocean near Norfolk, Virginia	Plane veered well off course, ran out of fuel and crashed into the Atlantic Ocean. Speculated loss of cabin pressure incapacitated Rein and pilot Lewis F. Benscotter.
Lance Reventlow	United States	1972	Entrepreneur and racecar driver	Cessna 206	Aspen, Colorado	attempted to fly into a blind canyon and stalled the aircraft while trying to turn around.
Randy Rhoads	United States	1982	Guitarist with Ozzy Osbourne	Beechcraft Model 35 Bonanza	Leesburg, Florida	crashed after wing clipped Ozzy Osbourne's tour bus during ultra-low-level fly-by
J. P. "The Big Bopper" Richardson	United States	1959	Singer, songwriter, disc jockey	Beechcraft Bonanza	Clear Lake, IA	Pilot error (continued VFR into IMC); Buddy Holly and Ritchie Valens also died in this accident (see The Day the Music Died).
Vincent Crane Richmond	United Kingdom	1930	Airship designer	Royal Airship Works R101	Beauvais, France	damage to fabric covering in bad weather leading to loss of gas and lift causing gentle descent into ground followed by fire and explosion
Jack Ridley	United States	1957	Test pilot	Douglas C-47	Tokyo, Japan	crashed into a snow-covered mountainside
Jenni Rivera	United States	2012	Singer	Learjet 25 N345MC	Near Iturbide, Nuevo Leon, Mexico	Mechanical failure
William B. Robertson	United States	1943	Aviator, co-founder of Lambert Field and Robertson Aircraft Corporation, Missouri Air National Guard commander	Waco CG-4A-RO	Lambert Field, St. Louis, Missouri, United States	Loss of right-hand wing due to wing strut fitting failure during demonstration flight; St. Louis mayor William D. Becker also dies in this accident
Jesse Robredo	Philippines	2012	Secretary of the Interior and Local Government	Piper PA-34 Seneca	Waters near Masbate, Philippines	Engine failure
Knute Rockne	Norway	1931	Notre Dame Fighting Irish football coach	Transcontinental & Western Air Fokker F-10	Bazaar, Kansas, United States	structure failure of wing
Calbraith Perry Rodgers	United States	1912	Aviator, made the first transcontinental airplane flight across the U.S.	Wright "Vin Fiz Flyer"	Long Beach, California	Bird strike over water
Stan Rogers	Canada	1983	Singer	Air Canada Flight 797	Boone County, KY	In-flight fire. Made emergency landing in Cincinnati Airport.
Will Rogers	United States	1935	Actor, humorist, singer	Lockheed Model 9 Orion (modified)	Walakpa Bay near Barrow, Alaska	Engine failure; killed in same crash as Wiley Post
Jaime Roldós Aguilera	Ecuador	1981	President of Ecuador	Beechcraft Super King Air	Ecuador	flew into mountain
Charles Rolls	United Kingdom	1910	Co-founder of Rolls-Royce Motors	Short-Wright Flyer (modified)	Bournemouth, England	tail structural failure.
Lester Roloff	United States	1982	Christian evangelist, operator of teenage homes	Cessna 210	near Normangee, Texas	crash likely due to thunderstorm activity in the area
Hillevi Rombin	Sweden	1996	Miss Universe 1955, national decathlon	Beechcraft Musketeer C-23	California, United States	engine failure caused by improper maintenance
Marie Rossi	United States	1991	First female combat commander (US)	Boeing CH-47 Chinook	Northern Saudi Arabia	collision with microwave tower
Constantin Rozanoff	France	1954	World War II ace and test pilot	Dassault Mystère IV	Melun, France	electrical problems
Edvard Rusjan	Austria-Hungary	1911	First Slovene aviator, aircraft constructor	Mercep-Rusjan monoplane	Belgrade, Serbia	Structural failure of the wing due to windy conditions.
Mary Russell, Duchess of Bedford	United Kingdom	1937	Record-setting aviator, Duchess of Bedford	De Havilland DH.60 Moth Major	North Sea, off Great Yarmouth, England	body never recovered
Thierry Sabine	France	1986	Paris-Dakar rally founder	Aérospatiale AS350 Ecureuil	Mali	Controlled flight into terrain during a sandstorm, with Daniel Balavoine
Francisco Sá Carneiro	Portugal	1980	Prime Minister of Portugal	Cessna 421	Camarate, Loures, district of Lisbon, Portugal	sabotage
Ghazi Sadiq	Sudan	2012	Guidance and Endowments minister	Antonov An-26	Nuba Mountains south Talodi, South Kordofan, Sudan	Controlled flight into terrain due to heavy rain; see 2012 Talodi Antonov An-26 crash
George Saitoti	Kenya	2012	Politician and Internal Security Minister	2012 Kenya Police helicopter crash (Eurocopter AS350 Écureuil)	Near Nairobi, Kenya	Crew lost control of the helicopter in conditions of poor visibility
Kyu Sakamoto	Japan	1985	Singer	Japan Air Lines Flight 123	Mount Osutaka, Japan	maintenance error leading to structural failure and hydraulic fluid loss with loss of control
Emiliano Sala	Argentina	2019	Professional footballer	2019 English Channel Piper PA-46 crash	Off Guernsey, Channel Islands	under investigation
William Sample	United States	1945	U.S. Navy rear admiral	Martin PBM Mariner	near Wakayama, Japan	wreckage and bodies not found for more than 37 months after crash
José Sanjurjo	Spain	1936	General/Coup Leader/Aspiring Dictator	Small Biplane	Estoril, Portugal	Overloaded Cargo
Pablo Santos	Mexico	2006	Actor	Piper PA-46	Toluca, Mexico	
Richard C. Saufley	United States	1916	U.S. Navy aviation pioneer, altitude and endurance record holder	Curtiss Model E	Santa Rosa Island, Florida	Crashed at 8-hour-51-minute mark of attempt to break own flight endurance record
Hans Schemm	Germany	1935	Bavarian minister of education	Heinkel sport model	Bayreuth, Germany	crashed into aerodrome roof when landing
Eddie August Schneider	United States	1940	Transcontinental record holder	Piper J-3	Floyd Bennett Field, New York	mid-air collision
Art Scholl	United States	1985	Aerobatic and stunt performer	Pitts Special	Near Carlsbad, California	Failed to recover from inverted spin during filming of Top Gun
Philippa Schuyler	United States	1967	Musician	helicopter	Da Nang, Vietnam	pilot error
Madhavrao Scindia	India	2001	Politician	Cessna C-90	Bhogaon, India	Engine fire
Elliot See	United States	1966	Astronaut	Northrop T-38 Talon	St. Louis, Missouri	with Charles Bassett; 1966 NASA T-38 crash
Antoine de Saint-Exupéry	France	1944	Writer and aviator	Lockheed F-5 Lightning	Mediterranean Sea south of Marseille	Crashed at sea, cause undetermined
Thomas Selfridge	United States	1908	First powered-airplane fatality. First military-aviation fatality. First passenger fatality. Namesake of Selfridge Field.	Wright Model A	Fort Myer, Arlington County, Virginia	Right propeller failure. U.S. Army Signal Corp contract acceptance trial flight piloted by Orville Wright, who was seriously injured.
Wilbur Shaw	United States	1954	Three-time Indianapolis 500 winner	Cessna	Decatur, Indiana	weather
Bell M. Shimada	United States	1958	Fisheries scientist	Aeroméxico Flight 111	Guadalajara, Mexico	Crashed into mountain
Shin Ki-ha	South Korea	1997	Four-term lawmaker and parliamentary leader	Korean Air Flight 801	Nimitz Hill, Guam	Improperly navigated approach
Evgenia Shishkova	Russia	2025	Figure skating coach and competitor	Bombardier CRJ701ER	Potomac River, Washington, D.C., United States	Federal Aviation Administration (FAA) route design and oversight failures; see 2025 Potomac River mid-air collision. Her husband Vadim Naumov also died in this accident
Larry Shue	United States	1985	Playwright	Beechcraft Model 99	Grottoes Grove, Virginia	hit mountain during approach to land
Richard Ormonde Shuttleworth	United Kingdom	1940	Racing driver, aviator and collector	Fairey Battle	Near RAF Benson, Oxfordshire, England	Flew into hill during solo night flying exercise
Władysław Sikorski	Poland	1943	Prime Minister of Poland	Consolidated Liberator II	Sea near Gibraltar	night take-off and pilot – only survivor – states elevator jammed, unable to climb. Aircraft hit water and sank
Hanwant Singh	India	1952	Maharajah of Jodhpur	Beechcraft Bonanza	India	
Larkin I. Smith	United States	1989	US Congressman from Mississippi	Cessna 177RG	Janice, Mississippi	In flight loss of control by the Non-Instrument rated pilot after encountering Instrument meteorological conditions resulting in the airplane spiraling into a wooded area.
Art Smith	United States	1926	Aviator	Curtiss Carrier Pigeon	Montpelier, Ohio	
Samantha Smith	United States	1985	Young activist	Bar Harbor Airlines Flight 1808	Auburn, Maine	Improper execution of instrument approach; failed to initiate timely go-around
Robert Smithson	United States	1973	Land art artist	Beechcraft Baron	Amarillo, Texas	pilot error
Earl Snell	United States	1947	Governor of Oregon	Beech Bonanza	Lakeview, Oregon	weather
Soundarya	India	2004	Kannada film actress, Kannada and Tamil actress	Cessna 180	Bangalore, India	aircraft crashed after takeoff
Vichai Srivaddhanaprabha	Thailand	2018	Billionaire businessman, owner of Premier League football club Leicester City	2018 Leicester helicopter crash	Leicester, East Midlands, UK	Loss of yaw control owing to a failure of the tail rotor control linkage
Mike Stefanik	United States	2019	NASCAR Driver	Aero-Works Aerolite 103 ultralight	Sterling, Connecticut	Engine failure leading to loss of power while attempting to land
Milan Rastislav Štefánik	Czechoslovakia	1919	Czechoslovak politician and French general	Caproni Ca.3	Ivanka pri Dunaji near Bratislava Airport, Czechoslovakia (now Slovakia)	unclear, probably wind shear
Laurence Steinhardt	United States	1950	United States Ambassador to Canada	Douglas C-47 Skytrain	Ramsayville near Ottawa, Ontario, Canada	
Ted Stevens	United States	2010	Former U.S. Senator	de Havilland Canada DHC-3 Otter (DHC-3T turbine conversion)	Dillingham, Alaska	Cause undetermined. Former NASA administrator Sean O'Keefe survived this crash.
Payne Stewart	United States	1999	Champion golfer	Learjet 35	Mina, SD (crash site). Location at time of death undetermined.	Hypoxia; see 1999 South Dakota Learjet crash. Bruce Borland also died in this accident.
Joseph Warren Stilwell Jr.	United States	1966	Brigadier-General United States Army	Douglas C-47 Skytrain	Pacific Ocean en route San Francisco – Honolulu	Body never recovered, presumed dead. Aircraft failed to arrive in Honolulu
Shirley Strachan	Australia	2001	Singer, Skyhooks	Bell 47	near Kilcoy, Queensland	flew into mountain in turbulence
Erik Strandmark	Sweden	1963	Actor	Cessna Skywagon	Trinidad and Tobago	
Jud Strunk	United States	1981	Singer, songwriter, comedian	Fairchild PT-19	Carrabassett Valley, Maine	Incapacitation – Pilot suffered heart attack during takeoff phase of flight
Haris Suleman	United States	2014	Record attempt to become the youngest pilot to fly around the world in 30 days	Beechcraft A36 Bonanza	Pacific Ocean, near Pago Pago	Crashing in the sea.
Thaddeus C. Sweet	United States	1928	US Congressman from New York	Curtiss O-1B Falcon	Whitney Point, New York	
Frank Swift	United Kingdom	1958	Goalkeeper, Manchester City and England, journalist	Airspeed Ambassador	Munich-Riem Airport, Germany	Munich air disaster caused by slushy runway conditions
Manuel Scorza	Peru	1983	Author	Aviaco Flight 134	Madrid, Spain	Collision resulting from runway incursion, caused by poor visibility and taxiway signage
Kazuharu Sonoda	Japan	1987	Professional wrestler	South African Airways Flight 295	Mauritius	Fire developed in the cargo section on the main deck which was probably not extinguished before crashing into the Indian Ocean. His wife was also killed in the crash.
Frank Tallman	United States	1978	Stuntman	Piper PA-23 Aztec	Trabuco Canyon, California	Controlled flight into terrain – Continued VFR into IMC
Ganapathi Thanikaimoni	India	1986	Palynologist	Pan Am Flight 73	Jinnah International Airport in Karachi, Pakistan	Murdered on the ground by terrorists who hijacked the plane
Jacques Thibaud	France	1953	Classical violinist	Lockheed Constellation	Nice, France	Controlled flight into terrain
Christopher Thomson, 1st Baron Thomson	United Kingdom	1930	British Secretary of State for Air	R101 disaster	Beauvais, France	Weather-related
June Thorburn	United Kingdom	1967	English actress	Iberia Flight 062 (Sud Caravelle)	Blackdown, Sussex, England	Controlled flight into terrain
Melanie Thornton	United States	2001	Singer, member of La Bouche	Crossair Flight 3597	Bassersdorf, Switzerland	Deliberate descent below minimum descent altitude (Decision Height) without having the required visual contact to the approach lights or the runway.
Enoch Thulin	Sweden	1919	Aeronautics industry leader, founder of AB Thulinverken	Thulin K	Landskrona, Sweden	Structural failure
Morris M. Titterington	United States	1928	Aviator and engineer	Travel Air	Snyders, Pennsylvania, United States	Flew into mountain in bad weather
Mike Todd	United States	1958	Film producer	Lockheed Model 18 Lodestar	Grants, New Mexico	Icing
Fritz Todt	Germany	1942	Nazi official	Heinkel He 111	Rastenburg, Germany	Crashed after take-off
Rick Tolley	United States	1970	Marshall University football head coach	Southern Airways Flight 932	Huntington, West Virginia	Descent below Minimum Descent Altitude during a nonprecision approach under adverse operating conditions, without visual contact with the runway environment.
Peter Tomarken	United States	2006	Former game show host, Press Your Luck	Beechcraft A36 Bonanza	Santa Monica Bay	engine failure after takeoff, due to maintenance error
Omar Torrijos	Panama	1981	Presiden of the Panamanian Revolution	de Havilland Canada DHC-6 Twin Otter	Marta Hill, Coclesito, near Coclé province, Panama	1981 Panamanian Air Force Twin Otter crash
John Tower	United States	1991	Former US Senator from Texas	Atlantic Southeast Airlines Flight 2311	Brunswick, GA	Malfunction of the left engine propeller control unit.
Marta Traba	Argentina	1983	Author	Aviaco Flight 134	Madrid, Spain	Collision resulting from runway incursion, caused by poor visibility and taxiway signage
Boris Trajkovski	Macedonia	2004	President of the Republic of Macedonia	Beechcraft 200 Super King Air	near Mostar	aircraft flew into mountain during approach to land in poor weather
Robert F. Travis	United States	1950	Brigadier general, U.S. Air Force	USAF Boeing B-29 Superfortress	Fairfield-Suisun Air Force Base, Fairfield, California	Attempted emergency landing due to runaway propellers and landing gear problems; see 1950 Fairfield-Suisun Boeing B-29 crash
Oliver Tree	United States	2026	Musician	Bell 206	Rio de Janeiro, Brazil	Collided with another helicopter midair; see 2026 Rio de Janeiro mid-air collision. Gaspi, Lucas A. Vignale and Lucas Frota also died in this accident
Gennady Troshev	Russia	2008	Military commander	Boeing 737	Perm, Russia	pilot error, see Aeroflot Flight 821
Curtis Turner	United States	1970	NASCAR driver	Aero Commander 500 Registration: N701X	Mahaffey, Pennsylvania	Engine failure on approach resulted in spin and subsequent crash; pilot impairment due to alcohol ingestion
Charles Ulm	Australia	1934	Air pioneer, made the first trans-Pacific flight from the United States to Australia	Airspeed Envoy	Pacific Ocean	Disappeared, body never recovered, presumed dead. Was flying between mainland United States and Hawaii during US-Australia record flight attempt.
Dmitry Utkin	Russia	2023	Military officer and founder of Wagner Group	Embraer Legacy 600	Kuzhenkino, Tver Oblast, Russia	Under Investigation; see 2023 Wagner Group plane crash
Ritchie Valens	United States	1959	Singer	Beechcraft Bonanza	Clear Lake, IA	Pilot error (Continued VFR into IMC); Buddy Holly and J.P. "The Big Bopper" Richardson also died in this accident (see The Day the Music Died).
Nick Vanos	United States	1987	NBA player for the Phoenix Suns	Northwest Airlines Flight 255	Detroit Metropolitan Wayne County Airport	Flightcrew failed to deploy flaps/slats prior to takeoff resulting in stall
Alexis Vastine	France	2015	Boxer	Eurocopter AS350	Villa Castelli, Argentina	collided in mid-air; see 2015 Villa Castelli mid-air collision
Stevie Ray Vaughan	United States	1990	Guitarist and singer	Bell 206B JetRanger (N16933)	East Troy, Wisconsin	impact with hillside during fog/inclement weather
Lucas A. Vignale	Argentina	2026	Director and screenwriter	Bell 206	Rio de Janeiro, Brazil	Collided with another helicopter midair; see 2026 Rio de Janeiro mid-air collision. Oliver Tree, Gaspi and Lucas Frota also died in this accident
Nevill Vintcent	India	1942	Pioneer of early Indian aviation	Lockheed Hudson (AM946)	English Channel	Missing on a flight from Portreath, Cornwall to Gibraltar, presumed enemy action.
Aurel Vlaicu	Romania	1913	Engineer, inventor, airplane constructor and early pilot	A Vlaicu II	Câmpina, Romania	in attempt to be the first to fly across the Carpathian Mountains
Lothar von Richthofen	Germany	1922	World War One ace pilot	LVG C.VI	Fuhlsbüttel, Germany	
Gustav Wagemann	Germany	1933	German lawyer and judge	Lufthansa	Fuhlsbüttel, Germany	collided with signal tower when landing in dense fog
Joseph A. Walker	United States	1966	Test pilot	Lockheed F-104 Starfighter	Barstow, California	Collided with North American XB-70 Valkyrie in a tight group formation for a publicity photo
John T. Walton	United States	2005	Son of Walmart founder Sam Walton	CGS Hawk Arrow	Jackson Hole, Wyoming	control failure due to maintenance error
George Welch	United States	1954	World War II Pearl Harbor pilot and test pilot	North American F-100 Super Sabre	Edwards AFB	demonstration flight
Paul Wellstone	United States	2002	US Senator from Minnesota	Beechcraft A100 King Air	Eveleth, Minnesota	aircraft stalled and crashed during approach to land in snow
Peter Wentworth-Fitzwilliam	United Kingdom	1948	8th Earl FitzWilliam	de Havilland Dove	France	
Oscar Westover	United States	1938	Major General, Chief of the United States Army Air Corps	Northrop A-17AS	Burbank, California	aircraft crashed in crosswind short of runway on landing approach
Walther Wever	Germany	1936	Generalleutnant, Chief of the Luftwaffe General Staff	Heinkel He 70	Dresden, Germany	aircraft crashed on takeoff due to maintenance error
Bill Whittington	United States	2021	Racing driver, 24 Hours of Le Mans winner	Swearingen Merlin	near Winslow, Arizona	
Prince William of Gloucester	United Kingdom	1972	British royalty, cousin of Elizabeth II	Piper PA-28R Arrow	near Wolverhampton Airport, England	aircraft he was piloting crashed immediately after take-off while he was participating in Goodyear Trophy Air Race
Arland D. Williams Jr.	United States	1982	Investment banker	Air Florida Flight 90	Washington, D.C. and Arlington County, Virginia	Atmospheric icing, Pilot error due to poor weather
Ernest Willows	United Kingdom	1926	Welsh airship pioneer	balloon	Hoo Park, Kempston, Bedford, England	
Al Wilson	United States	1932	Actor and stunt pilot	Curtiss Model D (replica)	Cleveland, Ohio	collision with autogyro at Cleveland Air Races
Orde Wingate	United Kingdom	1944	Soldier and founder of the Chindits	North American B-25 Mitchell	India	
Steve Wittman	United States	1995	Aircraft designer and builder and air-race pilot	Wittman O&O (Experimental) Registration: N41SW	Stevenson, Alabama	In-flight break-up due to improperly installed wing fabric
Willem Witteveen	Netherlands	2014	Senator, legal scholar and author	Malaysia Airlines Flight 17	Hrabove, Ukraine	airliner shootdown
Charles B. Yates	United States	2000	Politician, former New Jersey State Senator	Mitsubishi MU-2B-26A	Edgartown, Massachusetts	failure to follow instrument flight procedures resulting in collision with a tree
Don Yenko	United States	1987	Former racecar driver and owner and founder of Yenko Chevrolet	Cessna 210	Charleston, West Virginia	landing error
Shen Yi-ming	Taiwan	2020	Chief of the General Staff (Republic of China)	Sikorsky UH-60 Black Hawk	Wulai District, New Taipei, Taiwan	Pilot error due to inclement weather; see 2020 ROCAF UH-60M crash
Kongjian Yu	China	2025	Landscape architect and urban planner	Cessna 175	Aquidauana, Mato Grosso do Sul, Brazil	possible unsuccessful landing attempt after a go-around at a non-permitted time during a visual flight; see 2025 Aquidauana Cessna 175 crash
Lino Zanussi	Italy	1968	Businessman and appliance manufacturer	Piaggio PD-808 I-PIAI	San Sebastion, Spain	Controlled flight into terrain in bad weather
Teori Zavascki	Brazil	2017	Supreme court judge	Hawker Beechcraft King Air C90	Paraty, Rio de Janeiro	Under investigation.
Muhammad Zia-ul-Haq	Pakistan	1988	President of Pakistan	Lockheed C-130 Hercules	near Bahawalpur, Pakistan	sabotage
Aleksandr Zuyev	Russia	2001	Fighter pilot and Eastern Bloc defector	Yakovlev Yak-52	Bellingham, Washington	Aircraft failed to recover from an accelerated stall

== Musical groups or artists ==
Name	Nationality	Year	Description of members	Flight/aircraft	Location	Cause/circumstances
Aaliyah	United States	2001	Singer Aaliyah and members of her entourage	Cessna 402	Marsh Harbour Airport, Abaco Islands, The Bahamas	Aircraft was overloaded and the pilot lacked proper qualifications to fly it; see 2001 Marsh Harbour Cessna 402 crash
Alexandrov Ensemble	Russia	2016	Artistic director Valery Khalilov and 63 choir members	Tupolev Tu-154B-2	Black Sea near Sochi, Russia	Spatial disorientation; see 2016 Russian Defence Ministry Tupolev Tu-154 crash
The Blackwood Brothers	United States	1954	Baritone singer and pilot R.W. Blackwood and bass singer Bill Lyles	Beechcraft Model 18	Clanton, Alabama, United States	Aircraft stalled during attempted landing
China National Opera (Beijing)	China	1956	Ten members	Ilyushin Il-12	Eglisau, Switzerland	ČSA Flight 548
Jim Croce	United States	1973	Others killed in the crash were pilot Robert N. Elliott, Croce's bandmate Maury Muehleisen, comedian George Stevens, manager and booking agent Kenneth D. Cortese, and road manager Dennis Rast.	Beechcraft E18S	Natchitoches, Louisiana	Pilot's failure to see the obstruction due to physical impairment and because fog reduced his vision.
Buddy Holly, Ritchie Valens, J. P. Richardson	United States	1959	All three tourmates were killed, along with pilot Roger Peterson	Beechcraft Bonanza	Clear Lake, Iowa, United States	Controlled flight into terrain; see The Day the Music Died
Bar-Kays, Otis Redding	United States	1967	Four of six Bar-Kays members died: Ronnie Caldwell, Phalon Jones, Jimmy King and Carl Cunningham. Ben Cauley survived the crash and James Alexander was not on the plane. Also on board and killed was soul singer Otis Redding.	Beechcraft Model 18	Lake Monona, Madison, Wisconsin, United States	Cause undetermined
Chase	United States	1974	Four of eight band members were killed (Bill Chase, Walter Clark, John Emma and Wally Yohn)	Piper Twin Comanche	Jackson, Minnesota, United States	Controlled flight into terrain during landing descent
Keith Green	United States	1982	Green was killed along with 10 other passengers - including 2 of his children - and the pilot.	Cessna 414	Garden Valley, Texas; United States	Plane was determined to be dangerously overloaded; contributing to the crash shortly after takeoff.
Lynyrd Skynyrd	United States	1977	Lead vocalist Ronnie Van Zant, guitarist Steve Gaines, and back-up singer Cassie Gaines	1977 Convair 240 crash	Northeast of Gillsburg, Mississippi, United States	Fuel exhaustion
Reba McEntire's band	United States	1991	Guitarist Chris Austin, backup singer Paula Kaye Evans, bassist Terry Jackson, bandleader Kirk Cappello, guitarist Michael Thomas, drummer Tony Saputo, and keyboardist Joey Cigainero. McEntire herself was not on board.	British Aerospace BAe 125	San Diego, California, United States	Pilot's failure to maintain proper altitude and clearance over mountainous terrain, and the copilot's failure to adequately monitor the progress of the flight
Mamonas Assassinas	Brazil	1996	All five members were killed.	Learjet 25	Cantareira mountain range, Brazil	Controlled flight into terrain; see 1996 Madrid Taxi Aéreo Learjet 25 crash
Glenn Miller	United States	1944	Miller and all occupants of the transport plane.	Noorduyn Norseman	English Channel	disappeared, body never recovered.
Oliver Tree, Lucas Frota	United States	2026	Tree and the 6 other victims currently unidentified.	Bell 206	Rio de Janeiro, Brazil	Collided with another aircraft midair; see 2026 Rio de Janeiro mid-air collision
The Nelons	United States	2024	3 of the 4 members (Kelly Nelon Clark, her husband Jason Clark and their daughter Amber Nelon Kistler) were killed along with 3 other passengers and the pilot. Another daughter, Autumn Nelon Streetman, was not on board.	Pilatus PC-12	North of Gillette, Wyoming; United States	Under investigation; more in 2024 Gillette Pilatus PC-12 crash
Rick Nelson	United States	1985	All seven passengers, including Nelson. Both crew escaped.	Douglas DC-3		Fire on board caused by a defective heater. The plane made an emergency crash landing in a field, but all passengers died in the burning fuselage.
Passion Fruit	Germany	2001	Two of the Eurodance trio died: Maria Serrano Serrano and Nathalie van het Ende. Debby St. Maarten survived the crash. Former lead singer of La Bouche, Melanie Thornton was also killed in this crash.	Crossair Flight 3597	Bassersdorf, Switzerland	Controlled flight into terrain; crashed in hills short of runway during landing approach
Stevie Ray Vaughan	United States	1990	All five people - Vaughan, the pilot, and three members of Eric Clapton's entourage - died in the crash.	Helicopter	Near East Troy, Wisconsin; United States	The helicopter crashed into a hill due to low visibility conditions according to the NTSB.

== Political groups ==
Name	Nationality	Year	Description of members	Flight/aircraft	Location	Cause/circumstances
Australian Government	Australia	1940	10 fatalities, including cabinet ministers Geoffrey Street, James Fairbairn and Henry Gullett, and senior army officer Brudenell White	Lockheed Hudson	Canberra, Australia	1940 Canberra air disaster
Philippine Government	Philippines	1957	25 fatalities, including President Ramon Magsaysay, Education Secretary Gregorio Hernandez Jr., Senator Tomas Cabili, Congressman Pedro Lopez and Philippine Air Force Commanding General Benito Ebuen	Douglas C-47 Skytrain	Balamban, Philippines	1957 Cebu Douglas C-47 crash
Participants of the 60th National Defence Course	Finland	1978	15 fatalities, including 4 Members of the Parliament, 3 executives of governmental agencies, 3 business executives and 2 military commanders. The future Finnish president Tarja Halonen was not on the flight because she was expecting her baby, and doctor had prohibited her to enter the aircraft (she took a train instead).	Douglas DC-3	Rissala, Finland	1978 Finnish Air Force DC-3 crash
Pakistan–United States delegation	Pakistan	1988	30 fatalities, including President Muhammad Zia-ul-Haq, Chairman Joint Chiefs of Staff Committee Akhtar Abdur Rahman, United States Ambassador to Pakistan Arnold Lewis Raphel, US Brigadier General Herbert M. Wassom, and a group of senior Pakistani army officers.	Lockheed C-130B Hercules	Bahawalpur, Pakistan	1988 Pakistan Air Force C-130B crash
Polish official delegation to the Katyn war cemetery	Poland	2010	President Lech Kaczyński; First Lady Maria Kaczyńska; Former president of the Republic of Poland in exile Ryszard Kaczorowski; Senator Janina Fetlińska; Stanisław Komorowski; Andrzej Kremer, Tomasz Merta and others	Tupolev Tu-154M	Smolensk North Airport, Smolensk	Smolensk air disaster

== Sporting teams ==
Name	Nationality	Year	Team members killed	Flight/aircraft	Location	Cause/circumstances
Alianza Lima	Peru	1987	42 fatalities, including 16 players, coach Marcos Calderón, staff, cheerleaders, and crewmembers, with the exception of one survivor (the plane pilot)	Fokker F27-400M	Pacific Ocean, six miles from Ventanilla, Callao, Peru	Malfunctioning indicator, see 1987 Alianza Lima plane crash
Apex Motorsports	United Kingdom	2008	Three people total: team manager Richard Lloyd, driver David Leslie and a data engineer.	Cessna Citation 501	Farnborough, London	2008 Biggin Hill Cessna Citation crash
Associação Chapecoense de Futebol	Brazil	2016	71 people died in the crash, including 19 Chapecoense footballers and their coach, many staff members, officials and journalists. It is the deadliest accident in South America involving a sports team.	LaMia Flight 2933	Medellín, Colombia	LaMia Flight 2933
TJ Baník Chomutov ZJF	Czechoslovakia	1956	23 people died in the crash, six associated with this ice hockey team: three players (including Miroslav Pašek and Zdeněk Nový), two top club officials and a reporter	ČSA Flight 548	Eglisau, Switzerland	see: ČSA Flight 548
Bulgarian rhythmic gymnastics team; Polish track cycling team	Bulgaria	1978	5 Bulgarian gymnasts with coach; 5 Polish cyclists	Tupolev Tu-134		Balkan Bulgarian Airlines Flight 107
Bury St Edmunds Rugby Club	United Kingdom	1974	346 fatalities, including 18 members of rugby team	Turkish Airlines Flight 981 – McDonnell Douglas DC-10	Ermenonville Forest, France	Sudden decompression and severed controls after a cargo door failed.
Cal Poly San Luis Obispo	United States	1960	16 members of the college American football team and six others	Curtiss C-46 Commando	Toledo Express Airport	California Polytechnic State University football team plane crash
Canadian football Western All-Stars team	Canada	1956	Saskatchewan Roughriders players Mel Becket, Mario DeMarco, Gordon Sturtridge and Ray Syrnyk; Winnipeg Blue Bombers player Cal Jones	Trans-Canada Air Lines Flight 810-9	Mount Slesse, British Columbia	Crashed into mountain, cause undetermined; engine failure and bad weather were possible factors
Colourful 11 football team	Netherlands; Suriname	1989	14 players and their coach	Surinam Airways Flight 764	Zanderij airport	Controlled flight into terrain due to pilot error
Cuban national fencing team	Cuba	1976	All 24 members of the team, trainers and the coach	Cubana de Aviación Flight 455	Payne's Bay, Barbados	Bombing
Embassy Hill	UK	1975	six people total, including former F1 world champion Graham Hill, driver Tony Brise, team manager Ray Brimble, two mechanics and designer Andy Smallman.	Piper Aztec	Arkley, London, England, UK	crashed on golf course while attempting to land at nearby Elstree Airfield in fog
University of Evansville basketball team	United States	1977	29 players, staff and fans	Douglas DC-3	Evansville Regional Airport, Evansville, Indiana	Air Indiana Flight 216
Hendrick Motorsports	United States	2004	10 people associated with the team, including family, team crew, and pilots	Beechcraft Super King Air 200	Stuart, Virginia, USA	2004 Hendrick Motorsports aircraft crash
Lokomotiv Yaroslavl	Russia	2011	26 players and 3 coaches	Yakovlev Yak-42	Near Yaroslavl, Russia	Lokomotiv Yaroslavl plane crash
Manchester United	United Kingdom	1958	23 people total; including eight footballers: Geoff Bent, Roger Byrne, Eddie Colman, Duncan Edwards, Mark Jones, David Pegg, Tommy Taylor, and Billy Whelan; coach Bert Whalley, trainer Tom Curry, and club secretary Walter Crickmer. Also Frank Swift, a former player.	Airspeed Ambassador	Munich-Riem Airport	Munich air disaster
Marshall University football team	United States	1970	37 team members, five coaches, seven staff members, and 21 boosters	Southern Airways Flight 932		
Oklahoma State University	United States	2001	Ten people associated with men's basketball team (including two players)	Beechcraft Super King Air		Oklahoma State Cowboys basketball team plane crash
Old Christians Club rugby team	Uruguay	1972	11 players and the team physician; basis for 1974 book Alive: The Story of the Andes Survivors; survivors resorted to cannibalism	Fairchild FH-227	Andes	Uruguayan Air Force Flight 571
FC Pakhtakor Tashkent	Soviet Union	1979	17 players	Tupolev Tu-134	In the air above Dniprodzerzhynsk	1979 Dniprodzerzhynsk mid-air collision
Palmas Futebol e Regatas	Brazil	2021	Team owner Lucas Meira; four footballers: Marcus Molinari, Guilherme Noé, Lucas Praxedes, and Ranule; and the pilot	Beechcraft Baron	Porto Nacional, Tocantins	2021 Palmas FR plane crash
Puerto Rico women's national volleyball team	Puerto Rico	1970	Most members of the team	Dominicana de Aviación McDonnell Douglas DC-9		1970 Dominicana de Aviación DC-9 crash
A.C. Torino	Italy	1949	18 players, club officials, and journalists			Superga air disaster
USA Boxing team	United States	1980	14 boxers and 8 staff members	LOT Polish Airlines Flight 007		
USAC officials	United States	1978	8 lead officials	Piper Navajo		
U.S. Figure Skating team	United States	1961	all 18 skaters, coaches, and judges	Sabena Flight 548	Brussels, Belgium	Possible failure of flight controls
Wichita State University football team	United States	1970	14 players, plus head coach and 16 others	Martin 4-0-4	Silver Plume, Colorado	Wichita State University football team plane crash
Zambia national football team	Zambia	1993	All 18 footballers, including Efford Chabala and Wisdom Mumba Chansa	de Havilland Canada DHC-5 Buffalo	Libreville, Gabon	Gabon air disaster
