= Ottolina =

Ottolina is a surname.

- Renny Ottolina (1928 – 1978), Venezuelan producer and entertainer
- Rhona Ottolina (1955 – 2017), Venezuelan politician
- Sergio Ottolina (1942 – 2023), talian sprinter

== See also ==
- Ottolini
