= Paul Kollsman =

German-American inventor

- Born: February 22, 1900; Freudenstadt, German Empire
- Died: September 26, 1982 (aged 82); Beverly Hills, California, United States
- Known for: Barometer, flight instruments
- Scientific career
- Fields: Engineer, inventor

Paul Kollsman (February 22, 1900, in Germany – September 26, 1982, in Beverly Hills, California) was a German-American inventor. He invented the first sensitive barometer, a key enabler of instrument flight in airplanes.

The United States Patent Office cites him as the inventor on 124 patents.

== Biography ==
Kollsman studied engineering and science in Stuttgart and Munich. In 1923 he emigrated from Germany to the United States, following his younger brother Ernest Otto Kollsman, who had emigrated earlier.

He worked as a truck driver or truck driver's assistant until he found a position at Pioneer Instrument Company in Brooklyn, New York, where he learned to make various aircraft instruments.

He left Pioneer in 1928 and with $500 saved while working, Paul and his brother Otto founded Kollsman Instruments Co. in Brooklyn New York.

In 1929 U.S. Army Lt. James H. Doolittle was leading the development of equipment and methods for instrument flying, under the sponsorship of the Daniel Guggenheim Fund for the Promotion of Aeronautics. He learned of a new altimeter design submitted to the Bureau of Standards by Paul Kollsman, and arranged a meeting.

On August 30, 1929, Doolittle and Kollsman took the altimeter on a test flight in a Vought O2U, a two seat biplane, with Kollsman holding the altimeter in his lap. Doolittle said the altimeter "performed perfectly", with accuracy an order of magnitude better than other altimeters of the day. Harry F. Guggenheim stated the accuracy as 10 feet.

Doolittle had a Kollsman altimeter installed in a Consolidated NY-2 biplane, and on September 24, 1929, flew two instrument flights of 10 to 15 minutes duration at Mitchell Field on Long Island, the first flight in fog, the second using a hood after the fog lifted.

A short time later the Kollsman company received an order from the U.S. Navy for 300 altimeters, their first commercial success. Subsequent models were modified to allow the pilot to easily set a local altimeter setting, shown in the "Kollsman window". By the mid-1930s Kollsman altimeters dominated the aircraft market.

In 1940 the Kollsman Instrument Company was sold to Square D Company of Detroit for over $4,000,000. Paul became a Square D vice president in charge of the Kollsman Instrument division. Otto, who had been the company treasurer and controller, retired after the sale, and died on August 12, 1942.

After the merger Paul Kollsman and Square D president F. W. Magin gave $50,000 to the Institute of the Aeronautical Sciences in New York to establish the Paul Kollsman Library. The Institute, an ancestor of the American Institute of Aeronautics and Astronautics (AIAA), claimed that this was the most complete private aeronautical library in the United States. They offered to loan books by mail for the price of postage to anyone requesting them.

In 1951 Square D sold the Kollsman division to Standard Coil Products Co. of Chicago, a maker of TV tuners, for over $5,000,000. Standard Coil named long-time Kollsman general manager Victor Carbonara as vice-president of the division, implying that Paul Kollsman left the company after this sale.

In 1940 Kollsman purchased 800 acres (320 ha) of land outside Manchester, Vermont from International Paper Company, and founded Snow Valley, which formally opened in January 1942, and was one of the earliest ski areas in the United States. Snow Valley operated continuously until 1984, and in 1983 hosted the first U.S. Open Snowboarding Championships — now held annually at Stratton, Vermont. Snow Valley is being redeveloped as a private sporting community.

In 1944 Kollsman married Baroness Julie "Luli" Dorothea Baronin von Bodenhausen, an actress and author, in New York City; she died in 1951. In 1952 he married his second wife, Eva F. Kollsman, who survived him. Paul Kollsman died at Cedars-Sinai Medical Center in Los Angeles, California in 1982.

== Estate ==
In 1945 Kollsman purchased The Enchanted Hill, a fabulous estate in Beverly Hills, California, which contained a Mediterranean Revival main house of 10,000 square feet with 12 acres (4.9 ha) of formal gardens, which Mr. Kollsman eventually augmented to 120 acres (49 ha), designed by acclaimed architect Wallace Neff. The estate, which was described by architectural historian Sam Watters as "fantastical", had been built in 1925 at the top of Angelo Drive by MGM screenwriter Frances Marion and her cowboy-star husband, Frederick Clifton Thomson. Among other features, the estate included a mahogany-floored stable for Thomson's horse "Silver King". It was considered one of the finest estates in all of Los Angeles, was called a "poetic hilltop paradise, a timeless homage to the natural beauty that was once Los Angeles." Microsoft co-founder Paul Allen acquired the estate from Kollsman's widow, Eva, in 1997 for $20 million and razed the landmark house in 2000, with plans to build two 50,000-square-foot (4,600 m^{2}) mansions in its place. As of 2015 the site remains undeveloped, overgrown with brush and weeds. After Allen's death in 2018 it sold in 2021 for $65 million, under half of the original asking price.
