= View-limiting device =

Aviation training device

In aviation training, a view-limiting device simulates instrument meteorological conditions (IMC) by restricting a pilot's field of view only to the flight instruments. They are worn by pilots who are working toward an instrument rating, which allows a pilot to fly under instrument flight rules in conditions that do not permit visual flight. They are also used by instrument-rated pilots while practicing instrument flight to maintain competency.

Examples include foggles and the IFR hood. Foggles are glasses that have been frosted on the top half of the lenses to simulate foggy conditions.

== Use in training ==
View-limiting devices are widely used in instrument flight training to simulate the loss of outside visual references while still allowing a flight instructor to monitor the environment. In addition to traditional airplane instrument training, they are used in scenario-based helicopter training that recreates inadvertent flight into instrument meteorological conditions (IMC), including VFR into IMC scenarios. Safety campaigns and training syllabi recommend combining view-limiting devices with structured exercises and simulator sessions to teach pilots how quickly spatial disorientation can develop and to reinforce early avoidance and transition-to-instruments procedures. The U.S. Helicopter Safety Team (USHST) has promoted inadvertent-IMC awareness training and related safety resources for helicopter pilots, including the “56 Seconds to Live” campaign and guidance on simulator-based training.

== See also ==
- Safety pilot
- FAA Practical Test
- Continued VFR into IMC
