= Valery Chekalov =

Russian mercenary logistician (1976–2023)

- Валерий Евгеньевич Чекалов
- Born: Valery Yevgenyevich Chekalov; 10 January 1976; Vladivostok, Russian SFSR, Soviet Union
- Died: 23 August 2023 (aged 47); Kuzhenkino, Tver Oblast, Russia
- Cause of death: Plane crash
- Burial place: Saint Petersburg, Russia

Valery Yevgenyevich Chekalov (Russian: Валерий Евгеньевич Чекалов; 10 January 1976 – 23 August 2023) was a Russian mercenary leader, head of logistics of the Wagner private military company, and a close confidant of Wagner leader Yevgeny Prigozhin. Chekalov was Wagner's "logistics mastermind" and controlled several Prigozhin-linked front companies that coordinated Wagner Group activities in Libya and Syria, including managing mercenaries, securing weapons, and running Wagner's business operations in Syria and Africa. For his activities on Prigozhin's behalf, the United States sanctioned Chekalov in July 2023.

Chekalov was killed on 23 August 2023 in a plane crash in Tver Oblast, alongside Prigozhin and Dmitry Utkin.

== Personal life ==
Valery Yevgenyevich Chekalov was born on 10 January 1976. He was originally from Vladivostok, but had lived in St. Petersburg, Russia, since 2008. He was married and had previously served in the Russian Navy.

== Career with Wagner Group ==
Chekalov was a senior deputy to Wagner Group leader Yevgeny Prigozhin and served as the Wagner Group's "logistics mastermind". His call sign was "Rover". Among his responsibilities was reportedly arranging Prigozhin's travel. Chekalov also was a long-time senior employee in Concord Management and Consulting, the holding company for Prigozhin's business empire. He owned St. Petersburg-based Kollektiv Servis (also rendered Kollective Services), which shared an address with and was linked to Concord.

From at least 2020 until 2022, Chekalov was the director and controlled Neva JSC, a company associated with the Wagner Group's activities in Libya and Syria. Neva owned Krasnogorsk-based Evro Polis (also rendered Euro Policy). Evro Polis supplied anti-mine armored trucks to Wagner forces in Libya and had signed an agreement in December 2016 to fight alongside the Syrian Arab Army for a 25% share of oil and gas production from liberated fields in Syria. On 26 January 2018, the United States sanctioned Evro as an entity owned or controlled by Prigozhin and for its role in Syria. On 13 December 2021, the European Union sanctioned Evro Polis for its role as "a front for the Wagner Group in Syria".

== Sanctions ==
On 20 July 2023, the United States sanctioned Chekalov personally for his role in facilitating the shipment of weapons and munitions to Russia on Prigozhin's behalf, in violation of existing U.S. sanctions against Prigozhin.

== Death ==
Chekalov was killed on 23 August 2023 in the Tver Oblast plane crash, alongside Prigozhin and Dmitry Utkin. He was 47.

Chekalov was buried on 29 August at the Severnoye cemetery in St. Petersburg. The ceremony was attended by dozens of family and friends, including individuals identified by Reuters as Wagner mercenaries.

== See also ==
- Suspicious Russia-related deaths since 2022
