= Ottolini =

Ottolini is a surname.

- Luigi Ottolini (1925– 2002), Italian operatic tenor
- Luisa Ottolini (born 1954), Italian physicist
- Robyn Ottolini (born 1995), Canadian country singer and songwriter

== See also ==
- Ottolina
