= Safety pilot =

Role in aircraft pilot training

In aviation, a safety pilot is used during pilot training.

== Instrument training ==
During training for instrument flight under visual meteorological conditions, a safety pilot is a pilot who helps maintain visual separation from other aircraft, clouds, and terrain while another pilot is wearing a view-limiting device for the purposes of simulating instrument conditions.

Before a pilot is issued with an instrument rating, the instructor acts as safety pilot. However, after a pilot has been issued with an instrument rating, to maintain currency, he or she must complete at least six instrument approaches, practice holding procedures, and practice intercepting and tracking courses with the use of navigation systems every six months. One way to achieve this is under actual instrument conditions, however an alternative is to fly under visual conditions with a safety pilot.

The safety pilot does not have to be a flight instructor, and does not have to be instrument rated. This makes using a safety pilot a cheaper option than flying with an instructor.

Both pilots must agree before the flight which pilot is pilot in command (PIC) for legal purposes. However, both pilots may be able to log time as PIC. While the training pilot is "under the hood", the safety pilot is acting as PIC and can log time for that period.

== First officer training ==
Modern airliners require two pilots. When a junior first officer is still undergoing training, a safety pilot will sit in the jump seat to monitor the junior first officer and the captain. A safety pilot sitting in a jump seat cannot log time as flight hours.
