= Instrument meteorological conditions =

Flight category requiring pilots to fly with instruments rather than sight

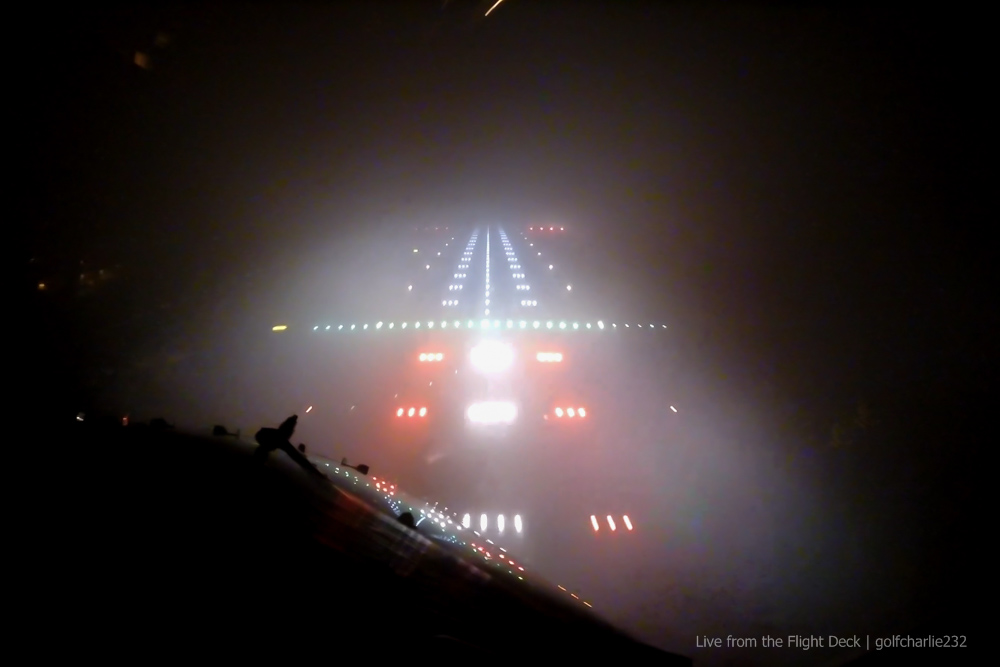
A pilot's view of the runway just before landing in thick fog at night

In aviation, instrument meteorological conditions (IMC) are weather conditions that require pilots to fly primarily by reference to flight instruments, and therefore under instrument flight rules (IFR), as opposed to flying by outside visual references under visual flight rules (VFR). Typically, this means flying in cloud or poor weather, where little or nothing can be seen or recognised when looking out of the window. Simulated IMC can be achieved for training purposes by wearing view-limiting devices, which restrict outside vision and force the trainee to rely on instrument indications only.

== Distinction from Visual Meteorological Conditions ==
The weather conditions required for flight under VFR are known as visual meteorological conditions (VMC). The boundary criteria between VMC and IMC are known as VMC minima. IMC and VMC are mutually exclusive. In fact, instrument meteorological conditions are defined as less than the minima specified for visual meteorological conditions. Conditions that are above VMC minima but relatively close to one or more of them are sometimes referred to as marginal VMC, and flight in such conditions is referred to as marginal VFR.

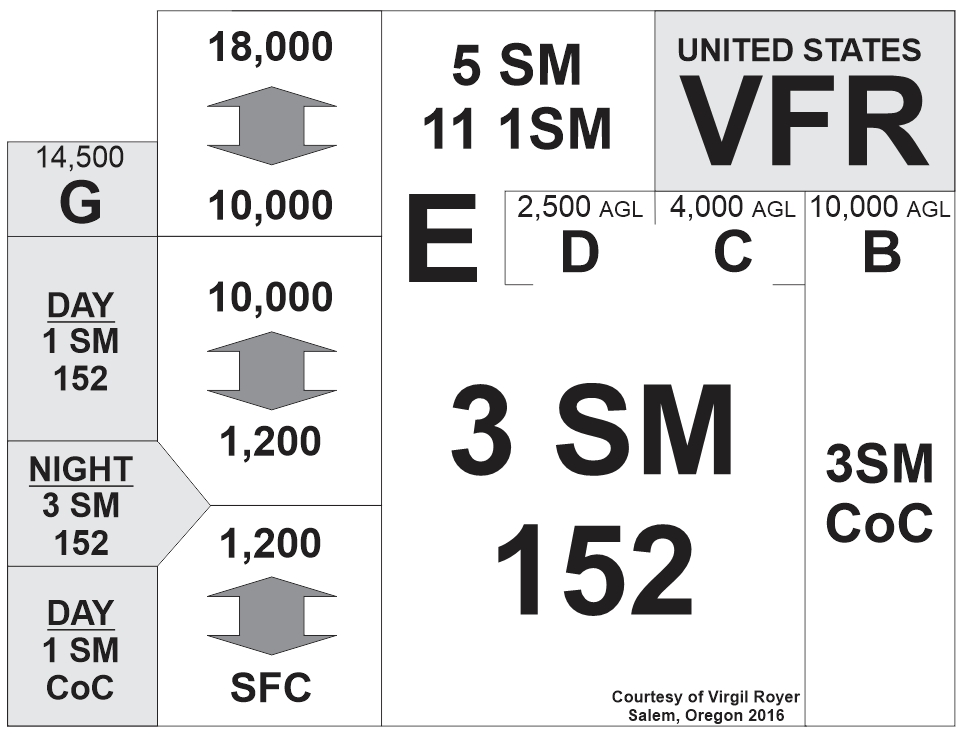
Summary of United States VMC minima (14 CFR 91.155), providing requirements for minimum visibility and separation from clouds for different airspace classes. In this example, for airspace classes C/D/E up to an altitude of 10,000 ft (3,000 m) AMSL, whether day or night, VMC minima require 3 miles (5 km) of visibility (denoted "3 SM") and cloud clearance of 1,000 ft (300 m) above, 500 ft (150 m) below, and 2,000 ft (610 m) horizontally ("152").

ICAO recommends the VMC minima internationally; they are defined and enforced by national regulations, which rarely significantly vary from ICAO. The typical variation is in the units of measurement as different regulatory authorities use different units of measurement in aviation.

The VMC minima tend to be stricter in controlled airspace, where there is increased air traffic, therefore greater visibility and cloud clearance is desirable. The degree of separation provided by air traffic control is also a factor. For example, in strictly-controlled class A and B airspace, where all aircraft are provided with positive separation, the VMC minima feature visibility limits only, whereas in classes C–G airspace, where some or all aircraft are not separated from each other by air traffic control, the VMC minima also feature cloud separation criteria.

=== Visibility and separation from clouds ===
With good visibility, pilots can determine the aircraft attitude by utilising visual cues from outside the aircraft, most significantly the horizon. Without such external visual cues, pilots may be subject to sensory illusions and must use an alternative reference for the attitude, which is usually provided by gyroscopically-driven instruments such as the attitude indicator ("artificial horizon"). The availability of a good horizon cue is controlled by meteorological visibility, hence minimum visibility limits feature in the VMC minima.

Because the basic traffic avoidance principle of flying under visual flight rules (VFR) is to "see and avoid", it follows that distance from clouds is an important factor in the VMC minima: as aircraft flying in clouds cannot be seen, a buffer zone from clouds established by the minimum separation requirements provides for time to react to an unseen/unknown aircraft exiting the clouds, especially when air traffic control may not be enforcing aircraft separation (as in airspace classes C-G).

=== Use of flight instruments under VMC ===
IMC should not be confused with IFR (instrument flight rules) – IMC describes the actual weather conditions, while IFR describes the rules under which the aircraft is flying. Aircraft can (and often do) fly IFR in clear weather, for operational reasons or when flying in airspace where flight under VFR is not permitted; for example, in the United States, flight under VFR in class A airspaces is prohibited except in emergencies. Indeed by far the majority of commercial flights are operated solely under IFR.

It is possible to be flying under IFR in conditions that are legally considered VMC, but still be forced to rely on flight instruments for attitude control because there is no distinct external horizon; for example, at night over water, which may create a so-called black hole effect if the sky and ground are equally dark, or when lights on the water cannot be distinguished from stars in the sky.

== Inadvertent entry into Instrument Meteorological Conditions ==
If weather deteriorates during flight or the aircraft flies into clouds, a flight that started out under VFR may turn into a flight under IMC. This is known as inadvertent entry into instrument meteorological conditions (IIMC), or more briefly VFR into IMC. IIMC is a potentially dangerous situation that has resulted in many accidents, as pilots may succumb to spatial disorientation, leading to loss of control or controlled flight into terrain. Statistics from the Federal Aviation Administration indicate that spatial disorientation is a factor in approximately 15% of general aviation accidents; of those, approximately 90% are fatal. Other statistics indicate that 4% of general aviation accidents were attributable to weather; of those weather-related accidents, 50% resulted from VFR into IMC, and 72% of the VFR into IMC accidents were fatal.

In the 180—Degree Turn Experiment conducted in 1954 by the University of Illinois, twenty student pilots flew from VFR into simulated IMC; after entry, all of them eventually reached a dangerous flight condition or attitude (Note: The authors defined the dangerous flight condition or attitude as one of the following four situations: 1. A stall, either normal or accelerated; 2. A bank exceeding 45°; 3. An excessive speed (more than normal fast cruise); 4. Obvious or prolonged loss of altitude or directional orientation) over a period ranging from 20 to 480 seconds. The average time to reach a dangerous condition was 178 seconds, echoed in the title of the "178 Seconds to Live" article distributed by the Federal Aviation Administration in 1993; however, the original 1954 study was noted for simulating an aircraft the subjects had little to no experience with, and only providing a partial instrument panel. In addition, the "178 seconds" average time was extracted from the preliminary evaluation; after training for a standardized procedure to exit IMC, each student pilot was tested three times, and 59 of the 60 resulting simulated flights successfully resulted in a controlled descent out of the cloud deck without reaching a dangerous condition.

== Safety and training ==
Unintended entry into instrument meteorological conditions remains a significant contributor to loss of control and controlled flight into terrain accidents, particularly for pilots operating under visual flight rules without recent instrument experience. Accident investigations and safety studies have highlighted that VFR flights continuing into deteriorating weather can lead to spatial disorientation and loss of situational awareness within seconds, especially in helicopters and light airplanes. In response, regulators and safety organizations promote scenario-based training, simulator exercises and decision-making tools that teach pilots to avoid marginal conditions, recognize early signs of weather deterioration and, if necessary, promptly transition to instrument flight rather than continuing VFR into IMC.

== See also ==
- Bárány chair
