= Wagner Group activities in Libya =

Russian paramilitary group operations

The Wagner Group, also known as PMC Wagner, a Russian paramilitary organization also described as a private military company (PMC), a network of mercenaries, and a de facto unit of the Russian Ministry of Defence (MoD) or Russia's military intelligence agency, the GRU, has conducted operations in Libya since late 2018.

== Introduction to the Libyan Civil War ==
Military situation in Libya in November 2018

In October 2018, the British tabloid The Sun cited British intelligence officials that two Russian military bases had been set up in Benghazi and Tobruk, in eastern Libya, in support of Field Marshal Khalifa Haftar who leads the Libyan National Army (LNA) in that country's civil war. It was said the bases were set up under the cover of the Wagner Group and that 'dozens' of GRU agents and special forces members were acting as trainers and liaisons in the area. Russian Kalibr missiles and S-300 SAM systems were also thought to be set up in Libya.

The Head of the Russian contact group on intra-Libyan settlement, Lev Dengov, stated that The Sun report did not "correspond to reality", although RBK TV also confirmed the Russian military deployment to Libya. By early March 2019, according to a British government source, around 300 Wagner PMCs were in Benghazi supporting Haftar. At this time, the LNA was making large advances in the country's lawless south, capturing a number of towns in quick succession, including the city of Sabha and Libya's largest oil field. By 3 March, most of the south, including the border areas, was under LNA control.

Following the southern campaign, the LNA launched an offensive against the GNA-held capital of Tripoli, but the offensive stalled within two weeks on the outskirts of the city due to stiff resistance. At the end of September, following reports of GNA airstrikes killing Russian mercenaries during the month south of Tripoli, including one that reportedly left dozens dead and Wagner commander Alexander Kuznetsov injured, Western and Libyan officials stated that during the first week of September more than 100 Wagner PMCs arrived on the frontline to provide artillery support for Haftar's forces. Following the GNA's recapture of a village south of Tripoli from the LNA, the GNA found the abandoned belongings of one of the PMCs.

Subsequently, at the sites of various clashes along the frontline, GNA militiamen were recovering Russian material being left behind. By early November, the number of PMCs had grown to 200 or 300 and Wagner snipers were causing a number of casualties among GNA frontline fighters, with 30 percent of the deaths in one unit being due to the Russian snipers. On one day, nine GNA fighters were killed by sniper fire. In another incident at the frontline town of 'Aziziya, three GNA fighters were killed by snipers while assaulting a Russian-occupied school. The PMCs eventually blew a hole in the wall of a classroom and escaped as the GNA attacked the school with Turkish armored vehicles. The PMCs' snipers killed a number of competent GNA mid-level commanders along the frontline. The presence of the PMCs also leads to more precise mortar fire being directed at the GNA. The PMCs were also equipped with laser-guided howitzer shells and thus artillery fire had become more precise through laser designation from ground spotters. They were also reportedly using hollow point ammunition in contravention of rules of war. With the ground fighting in the war among the local factions being considered amateurish, it was thought that the arrival of the PMCs could have an outsized impact. Additionally, the PMCs introduced land mines and improvised explosive devices into the conflict, planting a number of booby traps and minefields on the outskirts of Tripoli, as well as at least in one residential neighborhood of the capital. According to Jalel Harchaoui, a Libya expert at The Netherlands Institute of International Relations, the PMCs' toughness, lethal techniques and coordination discipline instilled fear in the GNAs' forces as their morale suffered.

== Detention and execution of civilians by Russian PMCs ==
A Wagner headquarters was set up at a hospital in the town of Esbia, 50 kilometers south of Tripoli, where the PMCs were stated to have detained and shot the family of a man who had stumbled upon the contractors by mistake. Three people were killed, while the man and another family member managed to survive the execution.

== Russian disinformation campaign in Africa linked to Wagner ==
At the end of October 2019, Facebook suspended accounts it said were part of a Russian disinformation campaign linked to Yevgeny Prigozhin. The campaign targeted eight African countries. At least some of the Facebook accounts came from the Wagner Group and the one operation that was attributed to Wagner was supporting two potential future political competitors in Libya. It had Egyptian page managers and the pages included Muammar Gaddafi nostalgia content. They also bolstered Saif al-Islam Gaddafi. The next month, the GNA stated that two Russians who were arrested by their forces in early July were employed by the Wagner Group. The two were arrested on suspicion of seeking to influence elections and were said to be involved in "securing a meeting" with Saif al-Islam Gaddafi. Later, it was reported that the two Russians had three meetings with Gaddafi by April 2019.

== Sanctions against Russian PMCs in Libya ==
In mid-November, the United States Congress was preparing bipartisan sanctions against the PMCs in Libya, whose number had risen to 1,400, according to several Western officials. The GNA, for its part, stated it documented between 600 and 800 PMCs in the country. These included 25 pilots, trainers and support crew, with the pilots flying missions in refurbished LNA Su-22 fighter-bombers.

== Downing of Italian and US drones in Libya linked to Russian PMCs ==
On 20 November, an Italian military drone crashed near Tripoli, with the LNA claiming it had shot it down. The next day, a US military drone was also shot down over Tripoli, although the LNA stated it had been brought down by mistake. According to the US, the drone was shot down by Russian air defenses which were operated either by Russian PMCs or the LNA. A GNA official also stated that Russian PMCs appeared to be responsible. An estimated 25 Wagner military technicians were thought to have established transmission towers and platforms atop buildings south of Tripoli, which lead to the bringing down of the drones by jamming of control signals for the aircraft.

On 12 December, a new assault by the LNA was launched towards Tripoli, with the LNA making several advances. It was said the Russian PMCs were leading the LNA assault. Over a two-day period, the PMCs, who were equipped with sophisticated drone-jamming technology and artillery, launched 2,500 mortar or artillery projectiles and brought down a Turkish drone which was deployed by the GNA in an attempt to deter the LNA push. The drone was the sixth of seven deployed by Turkey in June that had been brought down by this point. In early January 2020, The Libya Observer reported the Russian Air Force had transported fighters belonging to two other Russian private military companies, Moran and Shield, from Syria to Libya to further support the LNA. Meanwhile, according to Turkish President Recep Tayyip Erdoğan, the number of Wagner PMCs in Libya had reached 2,500. Later, he also accused the United Arab Emirates of providing some financing for the PMCs, while the Le Monde newspaper reported Saudi Arabia was also financing the group.

Following Turkey's and Russia's call for a ceasefire in Libya on 8 January 2020, the GNA claimed a significant number of Wagner fighters had withdrawn from the frontline via helicopters to the Al Jufra Airbase. Towards the end of February, a Wagner PMC stated for the Russian information agency InterRight that all of the PMCs had been withdrawn from Libya due to the ceasefire.

However, at the end of March, the GNA claimed to have targeted a building in the Qasr Bin Ghashir area south of Tripoli which had been occupied by Russian PMCs that had been responsible for several recent attacks on Tripoli neighborhoods. On 2 April, GNA airstrikes in two areas south of Bani Walid targeted an ammunition convoy, as well as a fuel convoy, reportedly destroying six trucks. Wagner PMCs were claimed to be in the vehicles, with one of them being killed and another wounded. On 22 April, the GNA's Interior Minister accused the Wagner Group of carrying out a chemical attack against its forces in the Salah al-Din area of southern Tripoli. According to the Minister, Wagner snipers shot dead GNA fighters who had succumbed to nerve agents.

In early May, according to a UN report, between 800 and 1,200 Wagner PMCs were deployed in Libya in support of the LNA. They were operating in specialized military tasks, including sniper teams. The UN also confirmed the presence of Syrian fighters who were transported to Libya since the start of the year via at least 33 flights operated by the Cham Wings airline. The Syrians numbered less than 2,000 and were made up of former rebels recruited by the Wagner Group, under Russian military supervision, to fight alongside them. Mid-May, GNA artillery reportedly shelled a Wagner base that was used for observation, intelligence and organizing operations.

== GNA captures strategic Al-Watiya Air Base ==
In late May, the GNA captured the strategic Al-Watiya Air Base and advanced into several districts of southern Tripoli, during which they captured three military camps. During the fighting, the GNA reported three Wagner PMCs were killed, with the body of one of them being seized. The first Syrian fighter from the force recruited to support the Wagner Group also died. Following these advances, Wagner's PMCs started to evacuate via Bani Walid's airport to Jufra, with hundreds being evacuated on 25 May. According to the GNA, between 1,500 and 1,600 "mercenaries" withdrew from Tripoli's frontlines in the previous days. The PMCs also pulled back their artillery and other heavy weapons during the withdrawal from southern Tripoli. On 26 May, according to the United States Africa Command (AFRICOM), Russia deployed fighter jets to the Al Jufra Airbase to support Wagner's PMCs. The jets arrived from an airbase in Russia via Syria, where they were repainted to conceal their Russian markings. The LNA denied it received new fighter jets.

Following the collapse of the LNA's offensive on Tripoli, the GNA launched an assault on the LNA-held city of Sirte in early June, managing initially to capture parts of the city, before a LNA counter-attack pushed the GNA's forces back. Subsequently, while the GNA was preparing a second assault, Russian PMCs were planting landmines in and around Sirte to "obstruct the advance" of the GNA. Mid-June, AFRICOM reported one of the newly arrived Russian aircraft was spotted taking off from the Al Jufra Airbase, while a MiG-29 fighter jet was seen operating near Sirte. There was concern the aircraft were being operated by the PMCs. At the end of the month, the GNA claimed a Wagner rocket attack west of Sirte left one civilian dead.

Towards the end of June, the Al Jufra airbase was reportedly turned into a Wagner Group command center for operations to take control of the country's southern oil fields and the PMCs at the base were said to include Ukrainians and Serbians, besides the Russian contractors. Subsequently, Wagner PMCs and pro-LNA Sudanese mercenaries, in coordination with a pro-LNA militia known as the Petroleum Facilities Guard, entered and secured Libya's largest oil field, the El Sharara oil field. The PMCs also secured the oil port of Sidra on the Mediterranean coast. Towards the end of July, "foreign mercenaries" were also reported to be at the Ras Lanuf petrochemical complex, Zuwetina oil port and Zallah field.

In July, the United States imposed sanctions on Wagner individuals and entities for the planting of landmines in and around Tripoli. Meanwhile, according to AFRICOM, Russia continued to supply the LNA through the Wagner Group with SA-22 missile launch vehicles, GAZ Tigr IMVs, Typhoon MRAPs and land mines. A total of 14 Mig-29 and Su-24 fighter jets had also been delivered. According to a UN report, 338 Russian military flights from Syria to Libya were conducted between November 2019, and July 2020, in support of the Wagner Group. In early August, a 21-vehicle Wagner convoy moved from Jufra to Sirte. Concurrently, the LNA, supported by the PMCs, were reinforcing the Jarif valley south of Sirte with ditches and barriers.

Mid-September, it was confirmed the Wagner Group was conducting air-strikes in support of the LNA, with two Mig-29s piloted by the PMCs crashing, one at the end of June, and the other in early September. A video of the second jets' pilot circulated online, showing him being rescued by an LNA combat helicopter after he parachuted and landed in the desert. Towards the end of September, a helicopter transporting ammunition crashed in Sokna, near Al Jufra, while en route to an oil field. Four PMCs were killed in the crash. It was reported in some open source OSINT research sites that Wagner lost at least 6 Pantsir air defense systems in the battles for Libya.

On 23 October 2020, a new cease-fire agreement was reached in Libya, with peace talks to subsequently begin. The talks started on 12 November. However, the same day, the GNA's army stated it would not accept further talks with the presence of the PMCs and their anti-aircraft systems in Sirte, after the LNA conducted live-fire exercises and the PMCs blocked their delegation from landing in Sirte, according to the GNA.

In December 2020, the United States Pentagon revealed that the United Arab Emirates was funding the Russian PMCs in Libya and was the main financial supporter of the Wagner Group. By late January 2021, the PMCs built a large trench, or a series of trenches, extending about 70 kilometers from Sirte towards the Wagner stronghold of Jufra. The trench was bolstered by a series of elaborate fortifications designed to disrupt land attacks. More than 30 defensive positions were dug along the trench with key positions near the Jufra air base and at the Brak airfield further south, where radar defenses were installed and fortified.

On 31 May 2022, Human Rights Watch stated that information from Libyan agencies and demining groups linked the Wagner Group to the use of banned landmines and booby traps in Libya. These mines killed at least three Libyan deminers before the mines' locations were identified.

== Sources ==
- Parker, John W. (2017). Putin's Syrian Gambit: Sharper Elbows, Bigger Footprint, Stickier Wicket. Institute for National Strategic Studies Strategic Perspectives, No. 25. Washington, D.C.: National Defense University Press. ISBN 9780160939983.
