= Rhona Ottolina =

Venezuelan politician

- Born: 15 September 1955
- Died: 30 June 2017 (aged 61); Miami, Florida, U.S.
- Occupation: Politician
- Parent: Renny Ottolina

Rhona Carolina Ottolina Lozada (15 September 1955 – 30 June 2017) was a Venezuelan politician. She served as a deputy in the Venezuelan Chamber of Deputies and was a presidential candidate in 1993.

== Personal life ==
Rhona was the daughter of television presenter Renny Ottolina.
