= Kuzhenkino =

Kuzhenkino (Russian: Куженкино) is the name of several inhabited localities in Bologovsky District of Tver Oblast, Russia.

Urban localities

- Kuzhenkino (urban-type settlement), an urban-type settlement; administratively incorporated as Kuzhenkinskoye Urban Settlement

Rural localities

- Kuzhenkino (rural locality), a selo in Kuzhenkinskoye Rural Settlement
