= Visual flight =

Controlling an aircraft through outside references

Visual flight or visual attitude flying is the control of an aircraft via outside references (such as the sky or the runway in takeoff). For aircraft, the primary visual reference used is usually the relationship between the aircraft's "nose" or cowling against the natural horizon. Regulations for visual flights are under a separate set of visual flight rules.

The pilot can maintain or change the airspeed, altitude, and direction of flight (heading) as well as the rate of climb or rate of descent and rate of turn (bank angle) through the use of the aircraft flight controls and aircraft engine controls to adjust the "sight picture". Some reference to flight instruments is usually necessary to determine exact airspeed, altitude, heading, bank angle and rate of climb/descent.
