= Renny Ottolina =

Venezuelan producer and entertainer

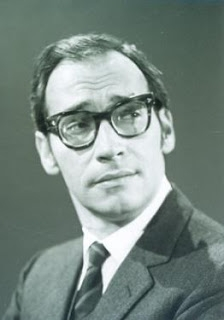
- Born: Reinaldo José Ottolina Pinto; December 11, 1928; Valencia, Carabobo, Venezuela
- Died: March 16, 1978 (aged 49)
- Body discovered: March 22, 1978 Pico Naiguatá
- Spouse(s): Reneé Lozada, divorced 1971
- Children: 3 (including Rhona Ottolina)

Reinaldo José Ottolina Pinto (December 11, 1928 – March 16, 1978) was a Venezuelan producer and entertainer. Born in Valencia, Carabobo, he performed professionally under the name Renny Ottolina.

== Early life ==
His mother Ana Mercedes Pinto died when he was two years old. At the age of six his father (an Italian immigrant) moved him to Caracas with his paternal grandmother. Renny went to different high schools and after he graduated it he knew what he want it and was a fast learner and he was mostly self-taught. At the age of seventeen, he started working in one of only a handful of radio stations that existed at the time in Caracas, as a broadcaster. With his perfect diction and harmonic voice, he quickly became a favorite among listeners. He learned English by working at the American embassy in Caracas.

== Television career ==
Ottolina began his television career in 1952, serving as host of the opening of the now defunct Televisora Nacional. Then, he was hired by the private television station RCTV to host Lo de hoy (Today it), a morning variety show with music and interviews. In 1958 RCTV snatched Ottolina as an independent producer and gave him his own show, El Show de Renny, which became a cornerstone of RCTV's programming.

In 1959 the ABC network took note of Ottolina and brought him to New York, to star in his own TV show. Even though he had a Latin accent, after a short time they moved him to compete with Jack Paar. After almost a year, ABC acquired 45% of the stocks in Televisa, the first privately owned television station in Venezuela, where they offered Ottolina the post of director general. But Ottolina resigned when he solicited stocks in exchange of his full attention.

Then Ottolina returned to RCTV to host his own show. He would typically host it for two consecutive years and then take a year off, spending that time in another country. Due to this, there were interruptions to the show between the years 1959 and 1961, 1962 and 1964, and 1965 and 1967, because he decided "to take and give you a break" for a year. This became a common practice for him, while taking sabbaticals traveling around the World.

While on one of his breaks in 1960, Ottolina hosted an English language program on the New York City television station WABC-TV. When he returned to Venezuela in 1961, he introduced the sketches format to his daily show.

In 1965, Ottolina began hosting another show on RCTV called Renny Presenta... (Renny Presents...), aired at Sunday nights, in which he mostly featured music and would focus on Venezuela and its natural beauties.

Over the years, Ottolina adopted a casual, conversational approach with extensive interaction with guests, which included Charles Aznavour, Ray Charles, Ella Fitzgerald, The Jackson 5, Tom Jones, La Lupe, Javier Solis, Miriam Makeba, Armando Manzanero, Raphael, Elis Regina, Sandro de América, Stevie Wonder and Zimbo Trio, among many significant performers.

In the seventies Ottolina started to enter Venezuelan politics and made many criticisms of corruption to Carlos Andrés Pérez, then President of Venezuela. He lost his spot on RCTV, when management decided Renny was making more money in his time slot than the network was. From there he moved to CVTV, where after a few months the same thing happened; he was more popular than the stations who carried his shows. It was at this point the three major TV stations in Venezuela decided not to allow independent productions. Since they could not compete with, nor control, Ottolina's hypnotic charisma. An old friend working as a radio manager convinced him to come back to his roots in radio; Ottolina did.

On the air again, he began to take a political stand. This served as a platform for the presidential campaign of 1978 when he ran for the President's office.

== Death and legacy ==
Ottolina died in 1978 in a plane crash near the Pico Naiguatá, situated on the border of the states Miranda and Vargas, while continuing his campaign for the presidency, which was ultimately won by Luis Herrera Campins. His untimely death, at the age of 49, led to popular suspicion and numerous rumors, mainly based on a conspiracy theory.

Today Renny Ottolina is remembered as one of the most important public figures in Venezuela. He is remembered as an entertainer for his charisma, creativity and quality as a producer. He was respected as an excellent citizen. His memorable quotes left a lasting impact on the Venezuelan audience and its contemporary culture. Many of his opinions about certain topics and the future stood the test of time. He is now remembered as someone who was ahead of his time.

In honor of Renny Ottolina, in 1998 his birthday, December 11, was declared as National Broadcaster’s Day. The day serves to recognize those announcers who exemplify high ethics and veracity in radio and television broadcasting.

== See also ==
- Venezuelan culture
