= Continued VFR into IMC =

Aviation term

Continued VFR into IMC is when an aircraft operating under visual flight rules intentionally or unintentionally enters into instrument meteorological conditions. Flying an aircraft without visual reference to the ground can lead to a phenomenon known as spatial disorientation, which can cause the pilot to misperceive the angle, altitude, and speed at which the aircraft is traveling. This is considered a very serious safety hazard in general aviation. According to AOPA's Nall Report, approximately 4% of general aviation accidents are weather-related, yet these accidents account for more than 25% of all fatalities.

== Inadvertent entry into Instrument Meteorological Conditions ==
If weather deteriorates during flight or the aircraft flies into clouds, a flight that starts out under VFR may turn into a flight under IMC. This is known as VFR into IMC or Inadvertent Entry Into Instrument Meteorological Conditions (IIMC). IIMC is a dangerous situation that has resulted in many accidents, as pilots may become subject to spatial disorientation without visual cues, leading to loss of control or controlled flight into terrain. Statistics from the Federal Aviation Administration (FAA) indicate that spatial disorientation is a factor in approximately 15% of general aviation accidents; of those, approximately 90% are fatal. Other statistics indicate that 4% of general aviation accidents are attributable to weather; of those weather-related accidents, 50% resulted from VFR into IMC, and 72% of the VFR into IMC accidents were fatal.

In the 180—Degree Turn Experiment conducted in 1954 by the University of Illinois in order to establish a baseline for the effectiveness of instrument training, twenty non-instrument rated pilots flew from VFR into simulated IMC. After entry, all of them reached a dangerous flight condition or attitude (Note: The authors defined the dangerous flight condition or attitude as one of the following four situations: 1. A stall, either normal or accelerated; 2. A bank exceeding 45°; 3. An excessive speed (more than normal fast cruise); 4. Obvious or prolonged loss of altitude or directional orientation) over a period ranging from 20 to 480 seconds. The average time to reach a dangerous condition was 178 seconds, echoed in the "178 Seconds to Live" title of the 1993 article distributed by the Federal Aviation Administration. However critics of the FAA's article point out that the subjects were chosen, per the report, to (a) "have had no previous instrument experience under either simulated or actual conditions", and (b) "have had a minimum of experience in the Beechcraft Bonanza." In addition, "The Beechcraft Bonanza C-35 was selected for these case studies upon the basis of preliminary flight testing which indicated that the technique would be most difficult to accomplish in the Bonanza." (These choices were not oversights, as the study's goal was to show the efficacy of instrument training and thus the scientific method requires establishing a priori to compare against post priori.)

Nonetheless, the 1954 study simulated an aircraft with which the subjects had little to no experience, intentionally chosen to be the most difficult to fly, with only a partial instrument panel, and the subjects themselves were chosen because of their lack of training and experience. In addition, the "178 seconds" average time was extracted from the preliminary evaluation; after training in a standardized procedure to exit IMC, each student pilot was tested three times, and 59 of the 60 simulated flights resulted in successful controlled descent out of the cloud deck without reaching a dangerous condition. As a result, AOPA's and the FAA's 178 second claim is thought by many to significantly mischaracterize the reality of flight in 1954, and does not take into account modern planes, instruments, and training standards.

== Prevention and training ==
Measures to reduce continued VFR into IMC accidents include improved preflight decision-making, enhanced weather awareness tools, simulator-based training and recurrent instrument practice for pilots who normally fly under VFR. In the helicopter sector, safety initiatives have promoted scenario-based training that recreates inadvertent IMC encounters and emphasizes early diversion or transition to instrument flight. One example is the "56 Seconds to Live" awareness video and associated training package produced by the U.S. Helicopter Safety Team (USHST), which has been adopted by operators, training providers and regulators as a tool for illustrating the rapid onset of spatial disorientation and loss of control in VFR flight into cloud.

== Examples of accidents involving continued VFR into IMC ==
- The Day the Music Died
- 2020 Calabasas helicopter crash
- 2015 Eglin Air Force Base helicopter crash

== See also ==
- Graveyard spiral – Spiral dive entered by a pilot due to spatial disorientation
- Aviation safety – State in which risks associated with aviation are at an acceptable level
- Pilot error – Decision, action, or inaction by an aircraft pilot
