= May 29 =

May 29 this year in various calendars
- Friday, 29 May 2026
Akan	Fofie
Armenian	13 Margach 1475
Aztec	Ochpaniztli 19, 10 Mazātl
Babylonian	11 Ayaru, 2337 SE
Balinese pawukon	Luang, Pepet, Pasah, Jaya, Umanis, Tungleh, Sukra of Warigadian, Kala, Urungan, Pati
Bengali	15 Joishtho, BS 1433
Chinese	Yin Water Rabbit・Neck Mansion; Fire Horse Year, Month 4, Day 13 (Xiaoman, 7 days until Mangzhong)
Common Era	29 May 2026 CE
Coptic	21 Pashons, AM 1742
Egyptian	13 Phaophi, 2775 NE
Ethiopian	21 Genbot, 2018 Amätä Məhrät
French Republican	Décade I, Décadi de Prairial de l'Année 234 de la République
Gregorian	29 May, AD 2026
Hebrew	13 Sivan, AM 5786
Hindu	Svātī・Varīyas; Solar: 15 Jyeṣṭha, 1948 SE; Lunisolar: Trayodaśī, Śukla pakṣa of Adhika Jyeṣṭha, 2083 VE; Rāudra・5127 KY・1,872,724
Icelandic	Föstudagur, 7 Skerpla 2026
Islamic	12 Dhu al-Hijjah, AH 1447 (using tabular method)
ISO week date	2026-W22-5
Japanese	13 Uzuki, Reiwa 8 (Shōman, 8 days until Bōshu)
Julian	16 May, AD 2026 (AM 7534)
Julian day	2461190
Korean	13 Baemdal, 4359 DE
Maya	13.0.13.11.7; 0 Zotz, 10 Manik
Roman	ante diem XVII Kalendas Iunias, MMDCCLXXIX AUC
Solar Hijri	8 Khordad, SH 1405
Tibetan	13 sa ga, me pho rta 2153 or 1772 or 1000

<<	May					>>
Su	Mo	Tu	We	Th	Fr	Sa
					1	2
3	4	5	6	7	8	9
10	11	12	13	14	15	16
17	18	19	20	21	22	23
24	25	26	27	28	29	30
31
2026

May 29 in recent years
2026 (Friday)
2025 (Thursday)
2024 (Wednesday)
2023 (Monday)
2022 (Sunday)
2021 (Saturday)
2020 (Friday)
2019 (Wednesday)
2018 (Tuesday)
2017 (Monday)

May 29 is the 149th day of the year (150th in leap years) in the Gregorian calendar; 216 days remain until the end of the year.

== Events ==
=== Pre-1600 ===
- 363 – The Roman emperor Julian defeats the Sasanian army in the Battle of Ctesiphon, under the walls of the Sasanian capital, but is unable to take the city.
- 526 – A catastrophic earthquake hits Antioch, killing several thousands including patriarch Euphrasius.
- 757 – Election of pope Paul I following the death of pope Stephen II in the previous month.
- 1108 – Battle of Uclés: Almoravid troops under the command of Tamim ibn Yusuf defeat a Castile and León alliance under the command of Prince Sancho Alfónsez.
- 1138 – Antipope Victor IV gives up his claim to the papacy due to the instigation of Bernard of Clairvaux.
- 1167 – Battle of Monte Porzio: A Roman army supporting Pope Alexander III is defeated by Christian of Buch and Rainald of Dassel.
- 1176 – Battle of Legnano: The Lombard League defeats Emperor Frederick I.
- 1233 – Mongol–Jin war: The Mongols enter Kaifeng after a successful siege and begin looting in the fallen capital of the Jin dynasty.
- 1328 – Philip VI is crowned King of France.
- 1416 – Battle of Gallipoli: The Venetians under Pietro Loredan defeat a much larger Ottoman fleet off Gallipoli.
- 1453 – Fall of Constantinople: Ottoman armies under Sultan Mehmed II capture Constantinople after a 53-day siege, ending the Roman Empire after over 2,000 years.
- 1555 – The Ottoman Empire and the Safavid Empire sign a peace treaty to end the Ottoman–Safavid War of 1532–1555.

=== 1601–1900 ===
- 1658 – Battle of Samugarh: Decisive battle in the struggle for the throne during the Mughal war of succession (1658–1659).
- 1660 – English Restoration: Charles II is restored to the thrones of England, Scotland and Ireland.
- 1733 – The right of settlers in New France to enslave natives is upheld at Quebec City.
- 1780 – American Revolutionary War: At the Waxhaws Massacre, the British continue attacking after the Continentals lay down their arms, killing 113 and critically wounding all but 53 that remained.
- 1790 – Rhode Island becomes the last of North America's original Thirteen Colonies to ratify the Constitution and become one of the United States.
- 1798 – United Irishmen Rebellion: Between 300 and 500 United Irishmen are executed as rebels by the British Army in County Kildare, Ireland.
- 1807 – Mustafa IV becomes Sultan of the Ottoman Empire and Caliph of Islam.
- 1825 – The Coronation of Charles X of France takes place in Reims Cathedral, the last-ever coronation of a French monarch.
- 1851 – Sojourner Truth delivers her famous Ain't I a Woman? speech at the Woman's Rights Convention in Akron, Ohio.
- 1852 – Jenny Lind leaves New York after her two-year American tour.
- 1861 – The Hong Kong General Chamber of Commerce is founded, in Hong Kong.
- 1864 – Emperor Maximilian I of Mexico arrives in Mexico for the first time.
- 1867 – The Austro-Hungarian Compromise of 1867 ("the Compromise") is born through Act 12, which establishes the Austro-Hungarian Empire.
- 1886 – The pharmacist John Pemberton places his first advertisement for Coca-Cola, which appeared in The Atlanta Journal.
- 1900 – N'Djamena is founded as Fort-Lamy by the French commander Émile Gentil.

=== 1901–present ===
- 1903 – In the May Coup, Alexander I, King of Serbia, and Queen Draga, are assassinated in Belgrade by the Black Hand (Crna Ruka) organization.
- 1913 – Igor Stravinsky's ballet score The Rite of Spring receives its premiere performance in Paris, France, provoking a near-riot.
- 1914 – The ocean liner RMS Empress of Ireland sinks in the Gulf of Saint Lawrence with the loss of 1,012 lives.
- 1918 – Armenia defeats the Ottoman Army in the Battle of Sardarabad.
- 1919 – Albert Einstein's theory of general relativity is tested (later confirmed) by Arthur Eddington and Andrew Claude de la Cherois Crommelin.
- 1920 – The Louth flood of 1920, a severe flash flood in the Lincolnshire market town of Louth, results in 23 fatalities in 20 minutes. It has been described as one of the most significant flood disasters in the United Kingdom during the 20th century.
- 1931 – Michele Schirru, a citizen of the United States, is executed by a Royal Italian Army firing squad for intent to kill Benito Mussolini.
- 1932 – World War I veterans begin to assemble in Washington, D.C., in the Bonus Army to request cash bonuses promised to them to be paid in 1945.
- 1935 – First flight of the Messerschmitt Bf 109 fighter aeroplane.
- 1945 – First combat mission of the Consolidated B-32 Dominator heavy bomber.
- 1947 – United Airlines Flight 521 crashes at LaGuardia Airport, killing 43.
- 1948 – United Nations Truce Supervision Organization is founded.
- 1950 – The St. Roch, the first ship to circumnavigate North America, arrives in Halifax, Nova Scotia, Canada.
- 1953 – Edmund Hillary and Sherpa Tenzing Norgay become the first people to reach the summit of Mount Everest, on Tenzing Norgay's (adopted) 39th birthday.
- 1962 – Chinese police open fire on protesters in Yining, Xinjiang, killing at least five people and wounding a dozen others.
- 1964 – The Arab League meets in East Jerusalem to discuss the Palestinian question, leading to the formation of the Palestine Liberation Organization.
- 1964 – Having deposed them in a January coup South Vietnamese leader Nguyễn Khánh has rival Generals Trần Văn Đôn and Lê Văn Kim convicted of "lax morality".
- 1973 – Tom Bradley is elected the first black mayor of Los Angeles, California.
- 1974 – SETA, a Finnish LGBT rights organisation, is founded in Helsinki.
- 1982 – Pope John Paul II becomes the first pontiff to visit Canterbury Cathedral.
- 1982 – Falklands War: The British Army defeats the Argentine Army at the Battle of Goose Green.
- 1985 – Heysel Stadium disaster: Thirty-nine association football fans die and hundreds are injured when a dilapidated retaining wall collapses.
- 1985 – Amputee Steve Fonyo completes cross-Canada marathon at Victoria, British Columbia, after 14 months.
- 1988 – U.S. President Ronald Reagan begins his first visit to the Soviet Union when he arrives in Moscow for a superpower summit with the Soviet leader Mikhail Gorbachev.
- 1989 – Signing of an agreement between Egypt and the United States that allows for the manufacture of F-16 Falcon parts in Egypt.
- 1990 – The Congress of People's Deputies of Russia elects Boris Yeltsin as President of the Russian Soviet Federative Socialist Republic.
- 1993 – The Miss Sarajevo beauty pageant is held in war-torn Sarajevo drawing global attention to the plight of its citizens.
- 1999 – Olusegun Obasanjo takes office as President of Nigeria, the first elected and civilian head of state in Nigeria after 16 years of military rule.
- 1999 – Space Shuttle Discovery completes the first docking with the International Space Station.
- 2001 – The U.S. Supreme Court rules that the disabled golfer Casey Martin can use a cart to ride in tournaments.
- 2004 – The National World War II Memorial is dedicated in Washington, D.C.
- 2005 – France rejects the Constitution of the European Union in a national referendum.
- 2008 – A doublet earthquake, of combined magnitude 6.1, strikes Iceland near the town of Selfoss, injuring 30 people.
- 2012 – A 5.8-magnitude earthquake hits northern Italy near Bologna, killing at least 24 people.
- 2015 – One World Observatory at One World Trade Center opens.
- 2020 – An oil spill in Norilsk releases 17,500 tons of diesel oil into nearby rivers.
- 2021 – A Cessna Citation I/SP crashes into Percy Priest Lake in Tennessee, killing all six people on board, including actor Joe Lara and his wife Gwen Shamblin Lara.
- 2022 – Tara Air Flight 197 crashes in Nepal's Mustang District, killing 22.

== Births ==
=== Pre-1600 ===
- 1421 – Charles, Prince of Viana (died 1461)
- 1443 – Victor, Duke of Münsterberg, Reichsgraf, Duke of Münsterberg and Opava, Count of Glatz (died 1500)
- 1504 – Antun Vrančić, Croatian archbishop (died 1573)
- 1555 – George Carew, 1st Earl of Totnes, English general and administrator (died 1629)
- 1568 – Virginia de' Medici, Italian princess (died 1615)
- 1594 – Gottfried Heinrich Graf zu Pappenheim, Bavarian field marshal (died 1632)

=== 1601–1900 ===
- 1627 – Anne, Duchess of Montpensier, French princess (died 1693)
- 1630 – Charles II of England (died 1685)
- 1675 – Humphry Ditton, English mathematician and philosopher (died 1715)
- 1716 – Louis-Jean-Marie Daubenton, French zoologist and mineralogist (died 1800)
- 1722 – James FitzGerald, 1st Duke of Leinster, Irish soldier and politician (died 1773)
- 1730 – Jackson of Exeter, English organist and composer (died 1803)
- 1736 – Patrick Henry, American lawyer and politician, 1st Governor of Virginia (died 1799)
- 1780 – Henri Braconnot, French chemist and pharmacist (died 1855)
- 1794 – Johann Heinrich von Mädler, German astronomer and selenographer (died 1874)
- 1797 – Louise-Adéone Drölling, French painter (died 1836)
- 1823 – John H. Balsley, American carpenter and inventor (died 1895)
- 1860 – Isaac Albéniz, Spanish pianist and composer (died 1909)
- 1871 – Clark Voorhees, American painter (died 1933)
- 1873 – Rudolf Tobias, Estonian organist and composer (died 1918)
- 1874 – G. K. Chesterton, English essayist, poet, and playwright (died 1936)
- 1880 – Oswald Spengler, German historian and philosopher (died 1936)
- 1892 – Alfonsina Storni, Swiss-Argentinian poet and author (died 1938)
- 1893 – Max Brand, American journalist and author (died 1944)
- 1894 – Beatrice Lillie, Canadian-English actress, singer and writer (died 1989)
- 1894 – Josef von Sternberg, Austrian-American director, producer, and screenwriter (died 1969)
- 1897 – Erich Wolfgang Korngold, Czech-American pianist, composer, and conductor (died 1957)
- 1899 – Douglas Abbott, Canadian lawyer and politician, 10th Canadian Minister of Defence (died 1987)

=== 1901–present ===
- 1902 – Harry Kadwell, Australian rugby league player and coach (died 1999)
- 1903 – Bob Hope, English-American actor, singer, and producer (died 2003)
- 1904 – Hubert Opperman, Australian cyclist and politician (died 1996)
- 1905 – Sebastian Shaw, English actor, director, and playwright (died 1994)
- 1906 – T. H. White, Indian-English author (died 1964)
- 1907 – Hartland Molson, Canadian captain and politician (died 2002)
- 1908 – Diana Morgan, Welsh-English playwright and screenwriter (died 1996)
- 1910 – Aleksandr Laktionov, Soviet painter (died 1972)
- 1910 – Ralph Metcalfe, American sprinter and politician (died 1978)
- 1913 – Tony Zale, American boxer (died 1997)
- 1914 – Stacy Keach Sr., American actor (died 2003)
- 1914 – Tenzing Norgay, Nepalese-Indian mountaineer (died 1986)
- 1915 – Karl Münchinger, German conductor and composer (died 1990)
- 1917 – John F. Kennedy, 35th President of the United States (died 1963)
- 1917 – Marcel Trudel, Canadian historian, author, and academic (died 2011)
- 1919 – Jacques Genest, Canadian physician and academic (died 2018)
- 1920 – John Harsanyi, Hungarian-American economist and academic, Nobel Prize laureate (died 2000)
- 1920 – Clifton James, American actor (died 2017)
- 1921 – Norman Hetherington, Australian cartoonist and puppeteer (died 2010)
- 1922 – Edith Roger, Norwegian dancer and choreographer (died 2023)
- 1922 – Joe Weatherly, American race car driver (died 1964)
- 1922 – Iannis Xenakis, Greek-French composer, engineer, and theorist (died 2001)
- 1923 – Bernard Clavel, French author (died 2010)
- 1923 – John Parker, 6th Earl of Morley, English colonel and politician, Lord Lieutenant of Devon (died 2015)
- 1923 – Eugene Wright, American jazz bassist (died 2020)
- 1924 – Lars Bo, Danish author and illustrator (died 1999)
- 1924 – Miloslav Kříž, Czech basketball player and coach (died 2013)
- 1924 – Pepper Paire, American baseball player (died 2013)
- 1926 – Katie Boyle, Italian-English actress and television host (died 2018)
- 1926 – Halaevalu Mataʻaho ʻAhomeʻe, Queen Consort of Tonga (died 2017)
- 1926 – Abdoulaye Wade, Senegalese academic and politician, 3rd President of Senegal
- 1927 – Jean Coutu, Canadian pharmacist and businessman, founded the Jean Coutu Group
- 1928 – Freddie Redd, American jazz pianist and composer (died 2021)
- 1929 – Harry Frankfurt, American philosopher and academic (died 2023)
- 1929 – Peter Higgs, English-Scottish physicist and academic, Nobel Prize laureate (died 2024)
- 1929 – Roberto Vargas, Puerto Rican-American baseball player, coach, and manager (died 2014)
- 1932 – Paul R. Ehrlich, American biologist and author (died 2026)
- 1932 – Richie Guerin, American basketball player and coach
- 1933 – Helmuth Rilling, German conductor and educator (died 2026)
- 1933 – Tarquinio Provini, Italian motorcycle racer (died 2005)
- 1934 – Bill Vander Zalm, Dutch-Canadian businessman and politician, 28th Premier of British Columbia
- 1935 – André Brink, South African author and playwright (died 2015)
- 1935 – Sylvia Robinson, American singer and producer (died 2011)
- 1937 – Charles W. Pickering, American lawyer and judge
- 1937 – Irmin Schmidt, German keyboard player and composer
- 1937 – Alwin Schockemöhle, German show-jumper
- 1937 – Harry Statham, American basketball player and coach
- 1938 – Christopher Bland, English businessman and politician (died 2017)
- 1938 – Fay Vincent, American lawyer and businessman, 8th Commissioner of Baseball (died 2025)
- 1939 – Pete Smith, Australian radio and television announcer
- 1939 – Al Unser, American race car driver (died 2021)
- 1940 – Taihō Kōki, Japanese sumo wrestler, the 48th Yokozuna (died 2013)
- 1940 – Farooq Leghari, Pakistani politician, 8th President of Pakistan (died 2010)
- 1941 – Doug Scott, English mountaineer and author (died 2020)
- 1941 – Bob Simon, American journalist (died 2015)
- 1942 – Pierre Bourque, Canadian businessman and politician, 40th Mayor of Montreal
- 1942 – Kevin Conway, American actor and director (died 2020)
- 1943 – Robert W. Edgar, American educator and politician (died 2013)
- 1944 – Bob Benmosche, American businessman (died 2015)
- 1944 – Quentin Davies, English soldier and politician, Shadow Secretary of State for Northern Ireland (died 2025)
- 1945 – Gary Brooker, English singer-songwriter and pianist (died 2022)
- 1945 – Peter Fraser, Baron Fraser of Carmyllie, Scottish lawyer and politician, Solicitor General for Scotland (died 2013)
- 1945 – Julian Le Grand, English economist and author
- 1945 – Martin Pipe, English jockey and trainer
- 1945 – Joyce Tenneson, American photographer
- 1945 – Jean-Pierre Van Rossem, Belgian scholar and author (died 2018)
- 1946 – Fernando Buesa, Spanish politician (died 2000)
- 1947 – Anthony Geary, American actor (died 2025)
- 1948 – Michael Berkeley, English composer and radio host
- 1948 – Keith Gull, English microbiologist and academic
- 1949 – Robert Axelrod, American actor and screenwriter (died 2019)
- 1949 – Brian Kidd, English footballer and manager
- 1949 – Francis Rossi, English singer-songwriter and guitarist
- 1950 – Rebbie Jackson, American singer and actress
- 1951 – Larry Blackmon, American singer-songwriter and producer
- 1953 – Danny Elfman, American film composer, singer-songwriter, producer, and actor
- 1954 – Robert Beaser, American composer and educator
- 1954 – Jerry Moran, American lawyer and politician
- 1955 – Frank Baumgartl, German runner (died 2010)
- 1955 – John Hinckley Jr., American attempted assassin of Ronald Reagan
- 1955 – David Kirschner, American animator, producer, and author
- 1955 – Gordon Rintoul, Scottish historian and curator
- 1955 – Ken Schrader, American race car driver and sportscaster
- 1956 – Mark Lyall Grant, English diplomat, British Ambassador to the United Nations
- 1956 – La Toya Jackson, American singer-songwriter and actress
- 1957 – Steven Croft, English bishop and theologian
- 1957 – Jeb Hensarling, American lawyer and politician
- 1957 – Mohsen Makhmalbaf, Iranian film director
- 1958 – Annette Bening, American actress
- 1958 – Juliano Mer-Khamis, Israeli actor, director, and activist (died 2011)
- 1958 – Uwe Rapolder, German footballer and coach
- 1958 – Mike Stenhouse, American baseball player and sportscaster
- 1959 – Rupert Everett, English actor and novelist
- 1959 – Mel Gaynor, English drummer
- 1959 – Steve Hanley, Irish-English bass player and songwriter
- 1960 – Thomas Baumer, Swiss economist and academic
- 1960 – Mike Freer, English politician
- 1961 – Melissa Etheridge, American singer-songwriter, guitarist, and activist
- 1961 – John Miceli, American drummer
- 1962 – Fandi Ahmad, Singaporean footballer, coach, and manager
- 1962 – Eric Davis, American baseball player
- 1962 – Carol Kirkwood, Scottish weather presenter
- 1962 – Chloé Sainte-Marie, Canadian actress and singer
- 1963 – Blaze Bayley, English singer-songwriter
- 1963 – Zhu Jianhua, Chinese high jumper
- 1963 – Ukyo Katayama, Japanese race car driver
- 1963 – Claude Loiselle, Canadian ice hockey player and manager
- 1964 – Howard Mills III, American academic and politician
- 1964 – Oswaldo Negri Jr., Brazilian race car driver
- 1966 – Natalie Nougayrède, French journalist
- 1967 – Noel Gallagher, English singer-songwriter and guitarist
- 1967 – Mike Keane, Canadian ice hockey player and coach
- 1967 – Steven Levitt, American economist, author, and academic
- 1968 – Torquhil Campbell, 13th Duke of Argyll, Scottish politician
- 1968 – Tate George, American basketball player
- 1968 – Jessica Morden, English politician
- 1968 – Hida Viloria, American activist
- 1970 – Natarsha Belling, Australian journalist
- 1970 – Roberto Di Matteo, Italian footballer and manager
- 1971 – Éric Lucas, Canadian boxer
- 1971 – Bernd Mayländer, German race car driver
- 1971 – Filipa Pinto, Portuguese politician
- 1971 – Jo Beth Taylor, Australian television host and actress
- 1971 – Rob Womack, English shot putter and discus thrower
- 1972 – Laverne Cox, American actress and LGBT advocate
- 1972 – Bill Curley, American basketball player and coach
- 1972 – Simon Jones, English singer and bass player
- 1972 – John Simon, Australian rugby league player
- 1973 – Tomoko Kaneda, Japanese voice actress, singer, and radio personality
- 1973 – Mark Lee, American guitarist and songwriter
- 1973 – Alpay Özalan, Turkish footballer
- 1973 – Myf Warhurst, Australian radio and television host
- 1974 – Steve Cardenas, American martial artist and retired actor
- 1974 – Stephen Larkham, Australian rugby player and coach
- 1974 – Aaron McGruder, American author and cartoonist
- 1974 – Jenny Willott, English politician
- 1975 – Jason Allison, Canadian ice hockey player
- 1975 – Mel B, English singer-songwriter, dancer, and actress
- 1975 – Sven Kubis, German footballer
- 1975 – Sarah Millican, English comedian
- 1975 – Anthony Wall, English golfer
- 1975 – Daniel Tosh, American comedian, television host, actor, writer, and executive producer
- 1976 – Caçapa, Brazilian footballer and manager
- 1976 – Jerry Hairston Jr., American baseball player and sportscaster
- 1976 – Raef LaFrentz, American basketball player
- 1976 – Yegor Titov, Russian footballer
- 1977 – Massimo Ambrosini, Italian footballer
- 1977 – Marco Cassetti, Italian footballer
- 1977 – António Lebo Lebo, Angolan footballer
- 1978 – Pelle Almqvist, Swedish singer-songwriter
- 1978 – Sébastien Grosjean, French tennis player
- 1978 – Adam Rickitt, English singer
- 1979 – Arne Friedrich, German footballer
- 1979 – Brian Kendrick, American wrestler
- 1979 – John Rheinecker, American baseball player (died 2017)
- 1980 – Ernesto Farías, Argentinian footballer
- 1981 – Andrey Arshavin, Russian footballer
- 1982 – Nataliya Dobrynska, Ukrainian heptathlete
- 1982 – Matt Macri, American baseball player
- 1982 – Kim Tae-kyun, South Korean baseball player
- 1984 – Carmelo Anthony, American basketball player
- 1984 – Nia Jax, Australian-American professional wrestler
- 1984 – Funmi Jimoh, American long jumper
- 1984 – Dhar Mann, American entrepreneur, film producer and YouTuber
- 1984 – Andreas Schäffer, German footballer
- 1984 – Ina Wroldsen, Norwegian singer and songwriter
- 1985 – Nathan Horton, Canadian ice hockey player
- 1987 – Lina Andrijauskaitė, Lithuanian long jumper
- 1987 – Jon Holland, Australian cricketer
- 1987 – Issac Luke, New Zealand rugby league player
- 1987 – Kelvin Maynard, Dutch footballer (died 2019)
- 1987 – Noah Reid, Canadian actor, musician, producer, and screenwriter
- 1987 – Rui Sampaio, Portuguese footballer
- 1988 – Muath Al-Kasasbeh, Jordanian captain and pilot (died 2015)
- 1988 – Cheng Fei, Chinese gymnast
- 1988 – Tobin Heath, American soccer player
- 1988 – Steve Mason, Canadian ice hockey player
- 1989 – Ezekiel Ansah, Ghanaian-American football player
- 1989 – Diego Barisone, Argentinian footballer (died 2015)
- 1989 – Riley Keough, American model and actress
- 1990 – Joe Biagini, American baseball pitcher
- 1990 – Erica Garner, American civil rights activist (died 2017)
- 1991 – Yaime Perez, Cuban discus thrower
- 1991 – Tan Zhongyi, Women's World Chess Champion, 2017–2018
- 1992 – Sarah Moundir, Swiss tennis player
- 1992 – Gregg Sulkin, English actor
- 1993 – Jana Čepelová, Slovak tennis player
- 1993 – Maika Monroe, American actress and kiteboarder
- 1993 – Grete Šadeiko, Estonian heptathlete
- 1995 – Konosuke Takeshita, Japanese professional wrestler
- 1997 – Tyler Nevin, American baseball player
- 1998 – Markelle Fultz, American basketball player
- 1998 – Austin Reaves, American basketball player
- 1999 – Park Ji-hoon, South Korean actor and singer
- 2000 – Gennaro Nigro, American soccer player
- 2000 – Adam Zdrójkowski, Polish actor and television presenter
- 2001 – Puka Nacua, American football player
- 2001 – Andrew Torgashev, American figure skater
- 2002 – Paul Skenes, American baseball player
- 2006 – Gukesh Dommaraju, Indian chess player

== Deaths ==
=== Pre-1600 ===
- 931 – Jimeno Garcés of Pamplona
- 1040 – Renauld I, Count of Nevers
- 1259 – Christopher I of Denmark (born 1219)
- 1311 – James II of Majorca (born 1243)
- 1320 – Pope John VIII of Alexandria, Coptic pope
- 1327 – Jens Grand, Danish archbishop (born c. 1260)
- 1379 – Henry II of Castile (born 1334)
- 1405 – Philippe de Mézières, French soldier and author (born 1327)
- 1425 – Hongxi Emperor of China (born 1378)
- 1453 – Ulubatlı Hasan, Ottoman commander (born 1428)
- 1453 – Constantine XI Palaiologos, Byzantine emperor (born 1404)
- 1500 – Bartolomeu Dias, Portuguese explorer and navigator (born 1451)
- 1500 – Thomas Rotherham, English cleric and minister (born 1423)
- 1546 – David Beaton, Scottish cardinal and politician, Lord Chancellor of Scotland (born 1494)
- 1593 – John Penry, Welsh martyr (born 1559)

=== 1601–1900 ===
- 1660 – Frans van Schooten, Dutch mathematician and academic (born 1615)
- 1691 – Cornelis Tromp, Dutch admiral (born 1629)
- 1790 – Israel Putnam, American general (born 1718)
- 1796 – Carl Fredrik Pechlin, Swedish general and politician (born 1720)
- 1814 – Joséphine de Beauharnais, French empress, first wife of Napoleon Bonaparte (born 1763)
- 1829 – Humphry Davy, English-Swiss chemist and academic (born 1778)
- 1847 – Emmanuel de Grouchy, Marquis de Grouchy, French general (born 1766)
- 1862 – Franz Mirecki, Polish composer, music conductor, and music teacher (born 1791)
- 1866 – Winfield Scott, American general, lawyer, and politician (born 1786)
- 1873 – Prince Friedrich of Hesse and by Rhine (born 1870)
- 1892 – Bahá'u'lláh, Persian religious leader, founded the Baháʼí Faith (born 1817)
- 1896 – Gabriel Auguste Daubrée, French geologist and academic (born 1814)

=== 1901–present ===
- 1903 – Bruce Price, American architect, designed the Château Frontenac and American Surety Building (born 1845)
- 1910 – Mily Balakirev, Russian pianist, composer, and conductor (born 1837)
- 1911 – W. S. Gilbert, English playwright and poet (born 1836)
- 1919 – Robert Bacon, American colonel and politician, 39th United States Secretary of State (born 1860)
- 1921 – Abbott Handerson Thayer, American painter and educator (born 1849)
- 1935 – Josef Suk, Czech violinist and composer (born 1874)
- 1939 – Ursula Ledóchowska, Austrian-Polish nun and saint, founded the Congregation of the Ursulines of the Agonizing Heart of Jesus (born 1865)
- 1941 – Léo-Pol Morin, Canadian pianist, composer, and educator (born 1892)
- 1942 – John Barrymore, American actor (born 1882)
- 1946 – Martin Gottfried Weiss, German SS officer, commandant of the Dachau concentration camp, executed war criminal (born 1905)
- 1948 – May Whitty, English actress (born 1865)
- 1951 – Fanny Brice, American singer and comedian (born 1891)
- 1951 – Dimitrios Levidis, Greek-French soldier and composer (born 1885)
- 1957 – James Whale, English director (born 1889)
- 1958 – Juan Ramón Jiménez, Spanish poet and academic, Nobel Prize laureate (born 1881)
- 1968 – Arnold Susi, Estonian lawyer and politician, Estonian Minister of Education (born 1896)
- 1970 – John Gunther, American journalist and author (born 1901)
- 1970 – Eva Hesse, American artist (born 1936)
- 1972 – Moe Berg, American baseball player, coach, and spy (born 1902)
- 1972 – Stephen Timoshenko, Ukrainian-American engineer and academic (born 1878)
- 1973 – George Harriman, English businessman (born 1908)
- 1977 – Ba Maw, Burmese politician, Prime Minister of Burma (born 1893)
- 1979 – Mary Pickford, Canadian-American actress, producer, and screenwriter, co-founder of United Artists (born 1892)
- 1981 – Nina Negri, Argentine-French painter and engraver (born 1901)
- 1982 – Romy Schneider, German-French actress (born 1938)
- 1983 – Arvīds Pelše, Latvian-Russian historian and politician (born 1899)
- 1987 – Charan Singh, Indian politician, 5th Prime Minister of India (born 1902)
- 1988 – Salem bin Laden, Saudi Arabian businessman (born 1946)
- 1989 – George C. Homans, American sociologist and academic (born 1910)
- 1991 – Margaret Barr (choreographer), Australian choreographer and teacher of dance-drama (born 1904)
- 1992 – Rogério Lemgruber, Brazilian criminal, founder of Comando Vermelho (born 1952)
- 1993 – Billy Conn, American boxer (born 1917)
- 1994 – Erich Honecker, German lawyer and politician, leader of the German Democratic Republic (East Germany) (born 1912)
- 1994 – Lady May Abel Smith, member of the British Royal Family (born 1906)
- 1996 – Tamara Toumanova, American ballerina and actress (born 1919)
- 1997 – Jeff Buckley, American singer-songwriter and guitarist (born 1966)
- 1998 – Barry Goldwater, American general, activist, and politician (born 1909)
- 2003 – David Jefferies, English motorcycle racer (born 1972)
- 2004 – Archibald Cox, American lawyer and politician, 31st United States Solicitor General (born 1912)
- 2004 – Samuel Dash, American academic and politician (born 1925)
- 2005 – John D'Amico, Canadian ice hockey player and referee (born 1937)
- 2005 – Hamilton Naki, South African surgeon (born 1926)
- 2005 – George Rochberg, American soldier and composer (born 1918)
- 2006 – Jacques Bouchard, Canadian businessman (born 1930)
- 2006 – Katarína Kolníková, Slovak actress (born 1921)
- 2007 – Dave Balon, Canadian ice hockey player and coach (born 1938)
- 2007 – Lois Browne-Evans, Bermudian lawyer and politician (born 1927)
- 2008 – Paula Gunn Allen, American writer (born 1939)
- 2008 – Luc Bourdon, Canadian ice hockey player (born 1987)
- 2008 – Harvey Korman, American actor and comedian (born 1927)
- 2010 – Dennis Hopper, American actor, director, and screenwriter (born 1936)
- 2011 – Sergei Bagapsh, Abkhazian politician, 2nd President of Abkhazia (born 1949)
- 2011 – Bill Clements, American soldier and politician, 42nd Governor of Texas (born 1917)
- 2011 – Ferenc Mádl, Hungarian academic and politician, 14th President of Hungary (born 1931)
- 2012 – Mark Minkov, Russian composer (born 1944)
- 2012 – Kaneto Shindo, Japanese director, producer, and screenwriter (born 1912)
- 2012 – Doc Watson, American singer-songwriter and guitarist (born 1923)
- 2013 – Richard Ballantine, American-English journalist and author (born 1940)
- 2013 – Françoise Blanchard, French actress (born 1954)
- 2013 – Andrew Greeley, American priest, sociologist, and author (born 1928)
- 2013 – Mulgrew Miller, American pianist and composer (born 1955)
- 2013 – Henry Morgentaler, Polish-Canadian physician and activist (born 1923)
- 2013 – Franca Rame, Italian actress and playwright (born 1928)
- 2013 – Ludwig G. Strauss, German physician and academic (born 1949)
- 2013 – Wali-ur-Rehman, Pakistani commander (born 1970)
- 2014 – Christine Charbonneau, Canadian singer-songwriter (born 1943)
- 2014 – Walter Jakob Gehring, Swiss biologist and academic (born 1939)
- 2014 – Peter Glaser, Czech-American scientist and engineer (born 1923)
- 2014 – Miljenko Prohaska, Croatian composer and conductor (born 1925)
- 2014 – William M. Roth, American businessman (born 1916)
- 2015 – Henry Carr, American football player and sprinter (born 1942)
- 2015 – Doris Hart, American tennis player (born 1925)
- 2015 – Betsy Palmer, American actress (born 1926)
- 2017 – Manuel Noriega, Panamanian general and politician, Military Leader of Panama (born 1934)
- 2017 – Mordechai Tzipori, Israeli Lieutenant General and minister (born 1924)
- 2017 – Konstantinos Mitsotakis, Greek politician and prime minister (born 1918)
- 2020 – Maikanti Baru, Nigerian engineer, former chief of state oil firm. (born 1959)
- 2021 – Gavin MacLeod, American actor, Christian activist, and author (born 1931)
- 2021 – Mark Eaton, American basketball player and sportscaster (born 1957)
- 2021 – B. J. Thomas, American singer (born 1942)
- 2021 – Cornelius Sim, Bruneian cardinal (born 1951)
- 2022 – Ronnie Hawkins, American rockabilly singer-songwriter and guitarist. (born 1935)
- 2022 – Sidhu Moosewala, Indian singer, rapper, actor and politician. (born 1993)
- 2024 – Bob Rogers, Australian radio and television host (born 1926)
- 2025 – Bernie Kerik, American police officer, 40th Police Commissioner of New York City and interior minister of the Iraqi Coalition Provisional Authority (born 1955)

== Holidays and observances ==
- Army Day (Argentina)
- Ascension of Bahá'u'lláh (Baháʼí Faith) (Only if Baháʼí Naw-Rúz falls on March 21 of the Gregorian calendar)
- Christian feast day:
  - Bona of Pisa
  - Hypomone (Eastern Orthodox Church)
  - Joseph Gérard
  - Maximin of Trier
  - Pope Alexander of Alexandria (Eastern Orthodox Church)
  - Pope Paul VI
  - Richard Thirkeld
  - Theodosia of Constantinople (Eastern Orthodox Church)
  - Ursula Ledóchowska
  - May 29 (Eastern Orthodox liturgics)
- International Day of United Nations Peacekeepers (International)
- Oak Apple Day (England), and its related observance:
  - Castleton Garland Day (Castleton)
- Veterans Day (Sweden)
- Democracy Day (Nigeria)
