= Natasha Pavlovich =

Business woman, actress, former model and beauty pageant contestant

- Born: Nataša Pavlović; March 14, 1968 (age 58); Yugoslavia
- Occupations: Actress, model
- Height: 1.73 m (5 ft 8 in)
- Partner: Joe Lara (1984–2015) (Note: They dated on an off between these years and were temporarily at one point engaged.)
- Children: 1
- Beauty pageant titleholder
- Hair color: Brown
- Eye color: Brown
- Major competitions: Miss Beverly Hills, CA. USA 1989; (Winner); Miss California USA 1990; (Finalist); Miss Yugoslavia 1991; (Winner); Miss Universe 1991; (Top 10)
- Website: www.natashapavlovich.com

External image
- Pavlovich at the 66th Golden Globe Awards in 2009.

Natasha Pavlovich is a Serbian-American actress, business woman, pilot, former model and beauty pageant titleholder. Pavlovich represented Yugoslavia in the Miss Universe 1991 competition where she reached the semi-finals. She also appeared in various films and national prime time television shows, as well as the 2021 HBO Max docuseries, The Way Down: God, Greed, and the Cult of Gwen Shamblin.

== Early life and education ==
Pavlovich was born on March 14, 1968, in Yugoslavia and raised in Popovi, a village in the Bijeljina municipality of Republika Srpska, Bosnia and Herzegovina. She is a descendant of the Pavlovic noble family. and the Pavlovac (fortress) During her childhood, her family relocated to Chicago, USA. She subsequently moved to Los Angeles, California to pursue an acting career. Pavlovich completed her studies in the English Language at the University of California, Los Angeles.

She serves as a spokesperson for the city of Slobomir, a town in Republika Srpska, which was founded by her aunt and uncle.

== Career ==
=== Beauty pageants ===
In 1989, Pavlovich won the title of Miss Beverly Hills. She was crowned Miss Yugoslavia in 1991, later representing the country in the Miss Universe 1991 pageant held in Las Vegas, progressing to the semi-finals.

=== Film and television ===
Starting in 1987, Pavlovich pursued professional acting in Hollywood, taking on roles in television dramas, sitcoms, and films. She has appeared in over 60 episodes of various television series, where her roles have included characters of Russian, Romanian, Iraqi, and Czech backgrounds. Noteworthy television roles include her portrayal of Marina Oswald Porter on a two-part special of Quantum Leap, as well as roles on Judging Amy, Nip/Tuck, Cybill, JAG (TV series), and The Agency (2001 TV series). After her work on the Paramount Studios show Wings (TV series) Disney/NBC Studios cast her in a regular role in the series Pride and Joy Pavlovich also worked with director Blake Edwards on the feature film Son of the Pink Panther, and appeared in the films The Naked Truth and Space Warriors. She had a regular role in the Serbian drama series Gorki Plodovi (Bitter Fruit in Serbian), playing an ophthalmologist.

In a documentary series entitled The Way Down helmed by acclaimed director Marina Zenovich and produced by Campfire Films, Nile Cappello, with Co-Executive production by Chrissy Teigan, Pavlovich provides her account of her relationship with Joe Lara, his marriage to Gwen Shamblin Lara, and the subsequent legal dispute between Pavlovich and Lara over the custody of their daughter.

=== Books ===
Pavlovich stated in September 2021 that she is currently in the process of writing a memoir.

== Personal life ==
Pavlovich met actor Joe Lara in 1984 and dated on an off for several years until 2015 and were briefly engaged. Together they have one child, a daughter (b. 2010).

Pavlovich holds a pilot's license and has notably co-piloted a MIG-25 to an altitude of 87,000 feet, making her the first Serbian woman to do so.

=== Legal controversy and news appearance ===
In 2015, Lara petitioned the court for sole custody of their daughter. The custody trial began in 2016 and Pavlovich represented herself beginning in 2019. In 2020, the court granted both parties equal custody of their daughter but named Pavlovich primary parent with all sole decision making rights. Following Lara's death in 2021, Pavlovich became primary parent.

The 2021 Percy Priest Lake Cessna Citation crash, which resulted in the deaths of Pavlovich's ex-fiancé Joe Lara Joe Lara his wife Gwen Shamblin Lara and five other passengers all members of the Remnant Fellowship church, drew significant media attention to Pavlovich. In the crash's aftermath, Pavlovich was concerned that her daughter may have been on the plane with Lara. A 911 call recorded during this period reveals Pavlovich urgently seeking information about the plane's passengers and trying to establish contact with the child's father. Despite managing to contact Lara's mother, Pavlovich was unable to get information regarding her daughter's location. She was eventually reunited with her daughter only after the Brentwood Police threatened to press kidnapping charges against a Remnant Fellowship member if her daughter was not produced.

== Filmography ==
1987	Epitaph		
1987	What a Country	Sonia	
1988	Martin Mull Live from North Ridgeville, Ohio	Natasha	
1988	The Munsters Today	Svetlana	
1989	Going Overboard		
1990	Grand		
1991	CBS Schoolbreak Special		
1991	Growing Pains		TV series
1991	Drexell's Class		
1992	Quantum Leap	Marina Oswald Porter	TV series (season 5)
1992	Dream On	"Joy Aplenty"	TV series
1992	The Naked Truth	Miss Bolivia	Comedy
1992–1993	Down the Shore	Marishka	Sitcom TV series
1993	Son of the Pink Panther	Rima	Comedy
1993	Martial Outlaw	Mia Antonova	Martial arts film
1993	Dark Justice		
1993	Delta	Paulina	
1994	Cobra		
1994	Good Advice		
1995	Wirehead		
1995	Wings		
1995	Pride and Joy	Katya	TV series
1995	Cybill	Marina	TV series
1995	JAG	Lieutenant Dumai	Episode: "Scimitar"
1997–1999	Night Man	Petra	TV series
1995	Partners		
1996	Mr. & Mrs. Smith	Natasha Pavlovich	
1997	Spy Game		
1997	Hawaii Five-O		
1997	Jenny		
1997	Mike Hammer, Private Eye		
1998	Players	Renata	
1998	JAG	Rusza	Episode: "Gypsy Eyes"
1998	LateLine	Yelena	
1998	Rounders		
1998	V.I.P.	Аlex	
1998	Silk Stalkings		
1999	The Darwin Conspiracy		
1999	Viper		
1999	Martial Law		
2001	Thieves		
2001–2002	The Agency	Tanja / Tanja (segment "Deadline")	TV series
2004	Judging Amy	Claire Swaime	TV series
2004	Nip/Tuck	Hannah	TV series
2002	Alias		
2003	Port Charles		
2004	Judging Amy		
2004	Nip/Tuck		
2006	I Did Not Know That		
2006	Monk	Nicole Wagner	TV series
2006	Drive	Irina	
2007	Atlanta		
2008	Las Vegas	Senator Greenberg	TV series
2008–2009	''Горки плодови''	Dr. Pavlovic	TV series
2013	Space Warriors	Russian Tech No. 1	Science fiction
2021	The Way Down	Herself	Documentary
