= Smyrna Airport (Tennessee) =

Airport in Smyrna, TN, US

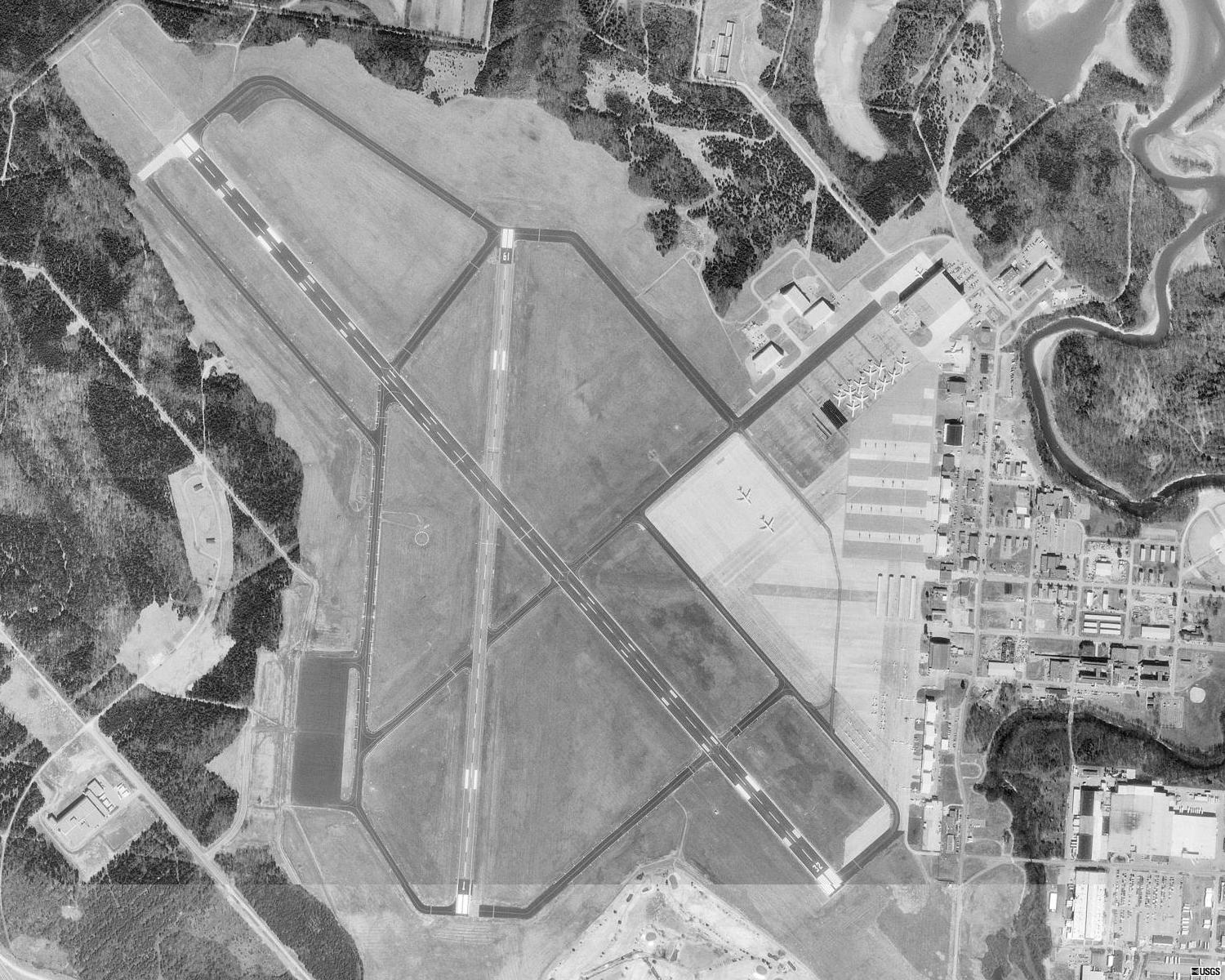
- USGS aerial image, February 1999
- IATA: MQY; ICAO: KMQY; FAA LID: MQY

Summary
- Airport type: Public
- Owner: Smyrna / Rutherford County Airport Authority
- Serves: Smyrna, Tennessee
- Elevation AMSL: 543 ft (166 m)
- Coordinates: 36°00′32″N 086°31′12″W

Map
- Location of airport in Tennessee MQY (the United States)

Runways
Direction	Length		Surface
Direction	ft	m	Surface
14/32	8,038	2,450	Asphalt
1/19	5,546	1,690	Asphalt

Helipads
Number	Length		Surface
Number	ft	m	Surface
H1	40	12	Concrete

Statistics (2023)
- Aircraft operations (year ending 1/31/2023): 123,375
- Based aircraft: 189
- Source: Federal Aviation Administration

Smyrna Airport (IATA: MQY, ICAO: KMQY, FAA LID: MQY) is a public general aviation and military use airport located two nautical miles (4 km) north of the central business district of Smyrna, a town in Rutherford County, Tennessee, United States. It is owned by the Smyrna / Rutherford County Airport Authority. Smyrna Airport is the third largest airport in Tennessee and is the state's busiest general aviation airport. Prior to March 1971, the facility was an active military installation known as Sewart Air Force Base.

This airport is included in the National Plan of Integrated Airport Systems for 2011–2015, which categorized it as a reliever airport for Nashville International Airport, which is located twelve nautical miles (22 km) to the north.

== Military use ==
Smyrna Airport currently operates as a joint use facility with a Tennessee Army National Guard helicopter unit, Army Aviation Support Facility #1 (AASF#1), which operates 60 helicopters with 300 full-time Army National Guard personnel.

The airport previously served as an outlying Air National Guard training facility for C-130 Hercules aircraft of the 118th Airlift Wing (now redesignated the 118th Wing) of the Tennessee Air National Guard at Berry Field Air National Guard Base at Nashville International Airport until the wing's termination of C-130 operations in 2012. The airport also continues to support training operations by C-17 Globemaster III aircraft of the Tennessee Air National Guard's 164th Airlift Wing at Memphis Air National Guard Base at the Memphis International Airport.

The Tennessee Army National Guard also leases part of the airport to maintain the Grubbs/Kyle Training Center. This facility supports 24 different units and 1,270 assigned Army National Guard personnel, 162 of which are full-time, as well as numerous military aircraft.

== History ==
In 1971, supplemental air carrier (essentially a charter carrier) Capitol International Airways consolidated operations and headquarters to the airport. The airline, later named Capitol Air, ceased operations on 25 November 1984, at which time it had two Boeing 727s and four Douglas DC-8s.

Between 1979 and 1981, Emery Air Freight operated a package express hub at the airport.

== Facilities and aircraft ==
Smyrna Airport covers an area of 1,700 acres (688 ha) at an elevation of 543 feet (166 m) above mean sea level. It has two asphalt paved runways 14/32 is 8,038 (grooved) by 150 feet (2,450 x 46 m) and 1/19 is 5,546 by 100 feet (1,690 x 30 m). It also has one helipad designated H1 with a concrete surface measuring 40 by 40 feet (12 x 12 m).

For the 12-month period ending January 31, 2023, the airport had 123,375 aircraft operations, an average of 338 per day: 88% general aviation, 2% military, 10% air taxi, and <1% scheduled commercial. At that time there were 189 aircraft based at this airport: 121 single-engine, 26 multi-engine, 40 jet, and 2 helicopter.

The airport has an operational control tower from 7am to 10pm on weekdays and 7am to 7pm on weekends, a precision instrument landing system (ILS) approach to Runway 32, and DoD Into-Plane Contract jet fuel for military and other US Government aircraft provided by the on-site civilian fixed-base operator (FBO), Contour Flight Management.

== Accidents and incidents ==
- On January 11, 1955, a USAF Fairchild C-119 Flying Boxcar crashed after engine failure 5 miles NE of the airport. All 37 airborne infantry and three crew members bailed out before the aircraft crashed, but two crew members were killed.
- On November 26, 1962, a USAF Lockheed C-130 Hercules lost two engines during a training flight and crashed. All five occupants died.
- On June 2, 2016, while practicing for an upcoming air show at the airport, United States Navy Blue Angels #6, an F/A-18 Hornet, crashed on the grounds of the Sam Davis Home, a nearby historic site. The pilot, USMC Capt. Jeff Kuss, was killed as a result of the crash. The incident occurred just after takeoff while Capt. Kuss was performing the Split-S maneuver. The Navy investigation found that he had performed the maneuver too low while failing to retard the throttle out of afterburner, causing him to fall too fast and recover too low above the ground. Capt. Kuss ejected, but his parachute was immediately engulfed in flames, causing him to fall to his death. His body was recovered multiple yards away from the crash site. The cause of death was blunt force trauma to the head. The investigation also cited weather and pilot fatigue as additional causes of the crash. There were neither casualties nor severe property damage on the ground, as the plane went down in an empty field. The Town of Smyrna has erected a permanent memorial to Capt. Kuss near the airport, which includes a decommissioned F/A-18 Hornet identical to the aircraft destroyed in the crash, painted in the Blue Angels #6 livery.
- On May 29, 2021, a Cessna Citation 501, registered N66BK, crashed into nearby Percy Priest Lake soon after takeoff. All seven occupants on board died, including Gwen Shamblin Lara and her husband Joe Lara. The NTSB's investigation yielded the result that the crash was allegedly due to "the pilot's loss of airplane control during climb due to spatial disorientation."

== See also ==
- List of airports in Tennessee
