= Georgia v. Smith =

American child abuse and murder court case

Georgia v. Smith was a court case held in 2007 resulting in the conviction of Joseph and Sonya Smith for child abuse and murder following the death of their eight-year-old son, Josef Smith, from "acute and chronic" corporal punishment. The couple, who lived in Mableton, Georgia, prior to their incarceration were each sentenced to life plus 30 years in prison, the maximum sentence.

Joseph is currently incarcerated at Macon State Prison, while Sonya is incarcerated at Arrendale State Prison.

== The case ==
Josef Smith died at a children's hospital after paramedics were called to the family's home in Mableton, an Atlanta suburb.

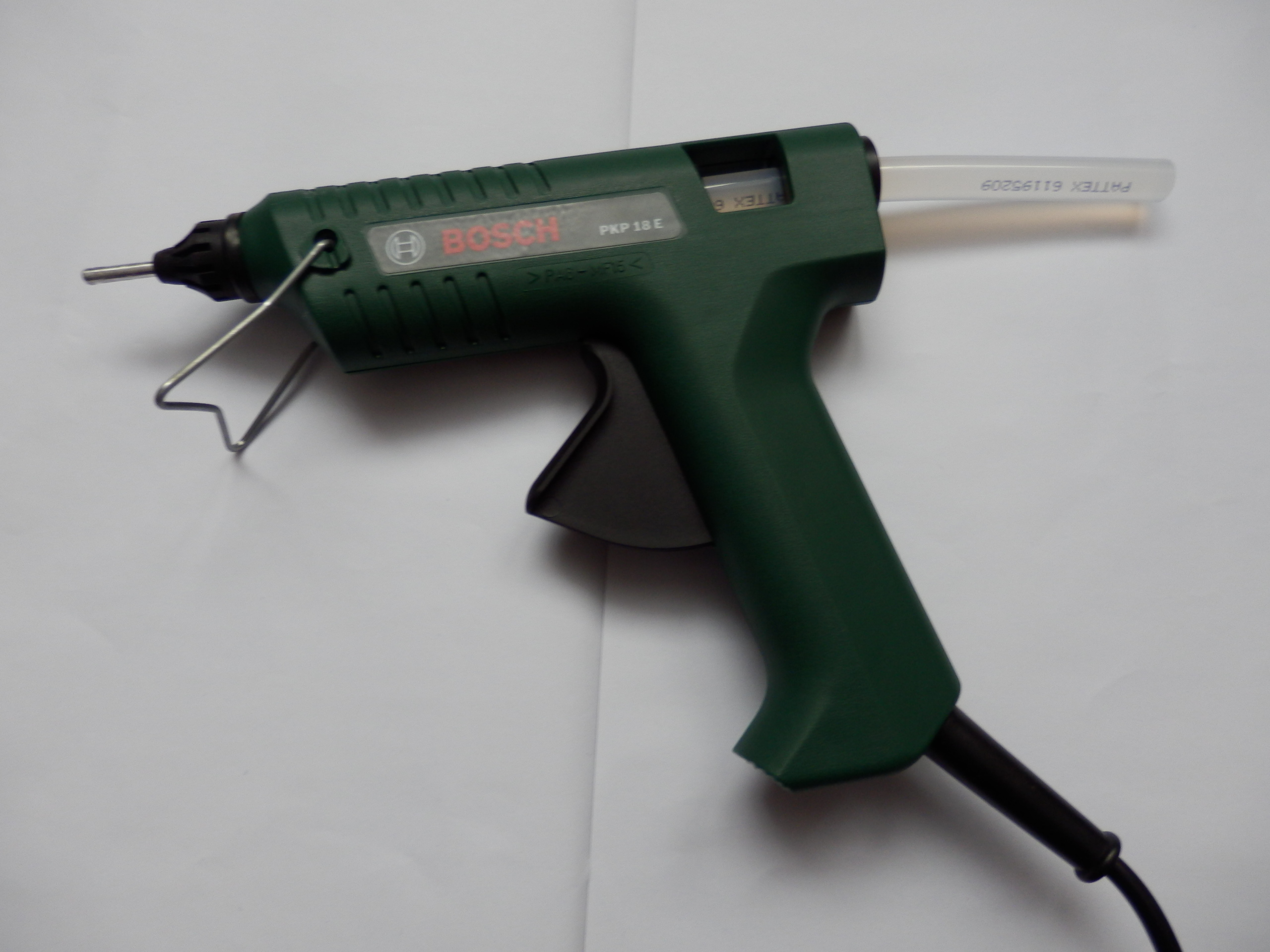
Example of a hot glue gun with a short piece of a glue stick in place. The Smiths used long, flexible glue sticks to whip their children.

In October 2003 the boys' parents had told authorities Josef had passed out and never regained consciousness after the family gathered in the kitchen to participate in a virtual prayer session with their church via the Internet. Mr. Smith reportedly told police that when he picked Josef up, he was "warm to the touch, wet with sweat, and unresponsive," that he thought his son was overheating, that he had carried the boy out to the carport in an unsuccessful attempt to cool him off. They then called 911. When the emergency responders arrived, the eight-year-old was not breathing and had no pulse. He died a day later, with the cause of death being either blunt force trauma or asphyxiation.

The medical examiners for Cobb County concluded that eight-year-old Josef Smith died as a result of "acute and chronic" abuse. Police said that the parents often locked the boy in a closet and forced him to pray to a picture of Jesus.

The Smiths admitted disciplining their son by striking him with a glue stick, but claimed the punishment never rose to the level of abuse.

== Church connection ==
The Smiths were members of the Brentwood, Tennessee-based Remnant Fellowship Church, which grew out of church leader Gwen Shamblin's Weigh Down Workshop (a Christian diet program she created in 1986). Authorities raided the church in June 2004 as part of the investigation of Josef Smith's death. However, "police who testified during the couple's trial said they could not find a link between the boy's death and the church's teachings about punishment."

The Smiths were arrested in December 2003 and spent four months in jail before Remnant church members posted their bond. In an interview with Gwen Shamblin, she said that Remnant church members decided to collectively foot the Smiths' legal bills.

Former members of the Smiths' church said the group's teachings on discipline include discussion of corporal punishment. Church leaders stated that they leave discipline to parents and that spankings are a last resort. At one point, Remnant Fellowship's website contained the following testimony from a member: "I was hesitant and sometimes refused to properly discipline my children because I didn't want to 'hurt' them or have them hate me." Now, "I discipline my children in order to save their souls from hell rather than being concerned about their flesh."

Before jury selection, the Smiths' attorneys said that the defense had made a deal with prosecution to limit the church's involvement in the trial. Police investigators said they could not find any link between the boy's death and the religious institution.

Remnant Fellowship is the owner of the website thesmithsareinnocent.com which lays out their belief in the parents' innocence. At one point they also owned thesmithsareguilty.com, which redirected to thesmithsareinnocent.com. Their site mainly contends that Joseph died from a bacterial infection as a result of "his chronic eczema and continual scratching he was plagued with."

After the Smiths' eventual conviction, Tedd Anger, one of the church's leaders, said they still believe the Smiths are innocent. The Cobb County medical examiner and the state medical examiner said that Josef's death was a homicide, not an accidental death and not a death due to illness. At the trial, witnesses for the state called it one of the worst cases of child abuse they had ever seen.

As of 2013, the Smiths were still members of Remnant Fellowship.

== Charges ==
Joseph and Sonya Smith were each charged with four counts of murder, five counts of first-degree cruelty to children, three counts of aggravated assault and two counts of false imprisonment.

== Trial ==
=== Prosecution ===
Prosecutors in the trial said Joseph and Sonya Smith beat their son Josef, locked him in a wooden box and confined him to a closet for hours at a time before he died in October 2003.

According to a 2007 article depicting testimonies from the live trial, Josef's older brother, Mykel, testified in congruence with the events presented by the prosecution. Mykel reported that on October 8, 2003, Josef was acting in defiance while the family watched a Remnant Fellowship broadcast. Josef began "screaming, cursing, and carrying on," Mykel testified. "Every time we prayed, he tried to do things to my little brother James [age 2]."

According to Mykel, parents, Sonya and Joseph asked Mykel to put Josef into a wood-lined chest. After Mykel got Josef into the chest, he tied the lid closed with an extension cord because Josef kept "popping his head up." Mykel testified that Josef continued cursing inside the box, yelling, "I'm going to kill all you motherf—s [sic] when I get out. James is the first one on my list. I'm going to slit his throat." Ten or fifteen minutes later, he stopped yelling. Mykel cut the extension cord and opened the chest. Josef was unresponsive.

Mrs. Smith told police that she "normally" gave the children their whippings in increments of ten blows each and that Josef had gotten several of those whipping sessions on the day of his death. The police reported that the Smiths locked Josef in his room to pray to a picture of Jesus on the ceiling and in a closet for days and even weeks. He was given only a bucket for a toilet. An older son sometimes held Josef down while the parents beat him with implements.

A police officer on the scene said the father told him after Josef's death, "I'm not going to lie to you—he's bruised."

According to the official trial documentation, Mykel also corroborated accusations that Sonya and Joseph routinely disciplined their son, Josef, by beating him with glue sticks, belts, and heated coat hangers; locking him in confined spaces for extended periods of time; and tying his hands with rope. During the day on October 8, 2003, Joseph beat Josef several times, striking him repeatedly with a foot-long glue stick.

=== Defense ===
The defense attorney for the Smiths said the injuries on the boy's body did not cause the boy's death and that the medical examiner did not perform tests that would have cleared his clients.

During the trial, the defense attorney pointed out that there was no DNA evidence to prove the boy was locked inside the wooden box as the prosecution claimed. The defense also said the closet that prosecutors accused the parents of locking the boy in had no wall to prevent him from going into his bedroom, because his father had been renovating the house.

The defense claimed that the boy died from septic shock resulting from a severe staph infection.

=== Verdict and sentencing ===
The Smiths were found guilty by all 12 members of the jury on February 16, 2007, which coincidentally would have been Josef's 12th birthday. They were both found guilty on 11 counts: one count each of felony murder, reckless conduct, false imprisonment; three counts of aggravated assault, and four counts of cruelty to children (two specifically pertaining to glue sticks and others to unknown objects)

After being convicted, the Smiths were then sentenced on March 27, 2007, to life plus 30 years in prison, the maximum punishment, by Cobb County Superior Court Judge James Bodiford. At the sentencing hearing approximately two dozen supporters for the Smiths were in the courtroom, and several friends spoke on the couple's behalf, describing them as kind.

The judge called the letters of support for the Smiths "amazing", but said the supporters likely did not have all the details.

== Appeal proceedings ==
In 2007, one of the church's leaders said they still believe the Smiths are innocent, and that the church would "... support the Smiths in any way possible". The Church helped fund their legal appeals and solicited donations for them on the Internet. Attorney Manubir Singh Arora, who represented the Smiths at trial, will not be handling their appeal. He told reporters that he was surprised and impressed by the level of support the church had shown the couple. "Frankly they've helped out a ton," Arora said. "And while people may or may not agree with whatever their beliefs are or the weight loss issues, the fact someone is willing to stick it out with you during one of the worst cases and worst times shows they're [the convicted child murderers and abusers] decent people."

The defendants did file a motion in Cobb County for new trial arguing the "ineffective assistance of counsel" of their defense lawyer, but that was denied on October 8, 2009.

An appeal was then brought to the Supreme Court of Georgia. One focus for the appeal was an event during the closing argument from the prosecutors, when they turned down the lights in the courtroom, lit candles on a birthday cake, and sang "Happy Birthday to You," referencing Josef's birthdate. This appeal was denied on November 8, 2010, when the Supreme Court of Georgia on a 5–2 vote upheld the murder convictions and life prison sentences given to both Joseph and Sonya Smith. The dissenting opinion cited improper conduct of the trial judge for allowing the prosecutors to sing "Happy Birthday" to the deceased boy, as these "theatrics" were unfair and potentially prejudicial against the parents.

A petition was filed on February 7, 2011, with the United States Supreme Court asking the Supreme Court to review the decisions made in the lower courts. This petition was denied on June 27, 2011.
