= Of Whom the World Was Not Worthy =

1978 novel by Marie Chapian

- First edition
- Author: Marie Chapian
- Language: English
- Genre: Novel
- Publisher: Bethany House Publishing
- Publication date: 1978
- Publication place: United States
- Media type: Print (paperback and hardcover)
- Pages: 256
- ISBN: 0-87123-250-2

Of Whom the World Was Not Worthy is an English-language novel written by the award-winning American author and psychologist Marie Chapian. The 256-page novel was published in 1978 by Bethany House Publishing.

== Description ==
Of Whom the World Was Not Worthy was written by Marie Chapian after travelling in the country formerly known as the Kingdom of Yugoslavia during the war known as the Invasion of Yugoslavia (also known as the April War), when the Axis powers – an alliance made up of Germany, Italy, Japan, Hungary, Romania, and Bulgaria - during World War II (1939–1945). The Axis Powers were against the Allies, an alliance headed by the British Empire, the Union of Soviet Socialist Republics, and the United States of America, among other countries including the Kingdom of Yugoslavia. The Invasion of Yugoslavia by the Germans began on 6 April 1941 and ended when the Royal Yugoslav Army surrendered on 17 April 1941. During Chapian's trip to the former Kingdom of Yugoslavia, she interviewed people of the former Kingdom of Yugoslavia, including peasants, gypsies, factory workers, physicians, laborers, and officials of the League of Communists of Yugoslavia. The purpose of Chapian's visit to the former Kingdom of Yugoslavia was to know how Yugoslav Christians sustained their faith during the Invasion of Yugoslavia. One of the results of Chapian's visit and findings is the novel Of Whom the World Was Not Worthy, which focuses on the life of Jakob (a Christian evangelist), Jozeca, and other Yugoslav Christians and their devotion to God during the war.
