= A.J.'s Time Travelers =

- Genre: Fantasy
- Directed by: Mike Finney and others
- Starring: John Patrick White; Wayne Thomas Yorke; Julie St. Claire
- Country of origin: United States
- No. of seasons: 1
- No. of episodes: 40

Production
- Executive producer: Gianni Russo
- Running time: 30 minutes
- Production companies: Gold Coast Company Entertainment; DNA Productions

Original release
- Network: Fox (Fox Kids Network) (First five episodes); Syndication (Amazin' Adventures)
- Release: December 4, 1994 – September 10, 1995

A.J.'s Time Travelers is a 1994 children's fantasy series that aired on the Fox television network. The series follows the adventures of teenager A.J. Malloy as he and his crew travel onboard the time-traveling ship Kyros, seeking knowledge across history.

== Plot ==
A.J., a teenage boy, is given a computer disk by an eccentric neighbor inscribed with "SCIENTIA EST POTENTIA" (Latin for "knowledge is power"). When downloaded, A.J. was transported to a time-traveling ship called the Kryos and made captain in the crew's effort to stave off a villain called Warp. Warp sought to capture the Kryos in order to use its knowledge for evil, but could only do so if A.J. failed to answer any of three questions he posed. Episodes included visits to Egyptian court official Imhotep, printing press inventor Johannes Gutenberg, Sir Isaac Newton. One episode also crossed with A.J's life outside the Kryos, where he struggled with a decision to join a high school clique who had snubbed a black friend of his. A.J. is then sent to meet Colonel Benjamin Davis of the Tuskegee Airmen, and better realizes the scenario after seeing the problems of Jim Crow and the Second World War.

== Cast and characters ==
- John Patrick White as A.J. Malloy, the Commander
- Julie St. Claire as Maria, the Captain
- Patty Maloney as B.I.T. (Back in Time)
- Wayne Thomas Yorke as Izzy/Mr. Malloy
- Larry Cedar as Warp/Ollie
- John Crane as The Fly
- Jeremiah Birkett as Pulse
- Teresa Jones as Mrs. Malloy

== Lawsuit ==
In 1995, children's writer Diane Russomanno sued former partner Gianni Russo and his companies for breach of contract, claiming they had used elements of her "Ricky Rocket" character in the A.J.'s Time Travelers series in violation of a 1994 settlement not to do so. After a three-month trial, the court found in favor of Russomanno, awarding her $54.2 million. The award was later lowered to $14.7 million.

== Broadcast history ==
Because of the lawsuit, the series has a complicated broadcast history. Russo initially obtained financing from the Bakrie Group to produce 40 episodes and Bohbot Media Inc. distributed the series as part of its Amazin' Adventures syndicated block of animated TV shows. It debuted on Sunday, December 4, 1994, on the former Fox Children's Network, but only five episodes aired. Bohbot continued to distribute the series to other outlets.

== Media information ==
A VHS tape containing two episodes of the series (visits to Thomas Jefferson and Winston Churchill) was distributed by Bridgestone Multimedia Group in 1999. A second tape contained episodes with Leonardo da Vinci and Aristotle.
