= The Way Down (TV series) =

2021 American documentary television miniseries

- Genre: Documentary
- Directed by: Marina Zenovich
- Music by: Isobel Waller-Bridge
- Country of origin: United States
- Original language: English
- No. of episodes: 5

Production
- Executive producers: Marina Zenovich; P.G. Morgan; Nile Cappello; Ross Dinerstein; Luke Dillon; Chrissy Teigen
- Producers: Ann Finnegan; Gina Scarlata
- Cinematography: Nick Higgins
- Editors: Erin Perri; Natalie De Diego
- Running time: 40-55 minutes
- Production companies: Campfire; Huntley Productions; PMZ Pictures

Original release
- Network: HBO Max
- Release: September 30, 2021 – April 28, 2022

The Way Down is an American documentary television miniseries directed and produced by Marina Zenovich. It follows Gwen Shamblin Lara, the founder of a diet program Weigh Down Workshop, and Remnant Fellowship, a new Christian group led by Shamblin Lara and located in Brentwood, Tennessee. It consists of 5 episodes and premiered with the first three on HBO Max on September 30, 2021, with the last two premiering on April 28, 2022. (Trailer Part 1) (Trailer Part 2)

== Plot ==
The series follows Gwen Shamblin Lara, the founder of a diet program Weigh Down Workshop, and The Remnant Fellowship, a church founded by Shamblin Lara.

== Episodes ==
No.	Title	Directed by	Original release date
1	"The Kingdom"	Marina Zenovich	September 30, 2021
2	"A Family Affair"	Marina Zenovich	September 30, 2021
3	"Seen But Not Heard"	Marina Zenovich	September 30, 2021
4	"Revelations"	Marina Zenovich	April 28, 2022
5	"The Way Forward"	Marina Zenovich	April 28, 2022

== Production ==
Nile Cappello began researching Gwen Shamblin Lara and The Remnant Fellowship, spending months getting to know former members. Cappello brought the project to Campfire, who agreed to produce the series, and asked Marina Zenovich to direct.

The producers had reached out to Gwen Shamblin Lara and The Remnant Fellowship for an interview, but all declined. However, the church posted a response to the miniseries on the RemnantFellowship.org website. During the final stages of post-production on the series, Gwen Shamblin Lara died in a plane crash. Afterward, people who had been unwilling to speak about their experiences with Shamblin Lara and The Remnant Fellowship reached out to Zenovich.
