= Steel Frontier =

1995 film

- Theatrical release poster
- Directed by: Jacobsen Hart; Paul G. Volk
- Written by: Jacobsen Hart
- Produced by: Joseph Merhi; Richard Pepin
- Starring: Joe Lara; Bo Svenson; Stacie Foster; Brion James; Kane Hodder; James C. Victor; Billy L. Sullivan; Robert O'Reilly; Brian Huckeba; Adolfo Quinones
- Cinematography: Richard Pepin
- Edited by: Chris Worland
- Music by: John Gonzalez
- Distributed by: Madacy Entertainment
- Release date: March 28, 1995
- Running time: 105 min.
- Country: United States
- Language: English

Steel Frontier is a 1995 post-apocalyptic science fiction Western film directed by Jacobsen Hart and Paul G. Volk and starring Joe Lara, Bo Svenson, Stacie Foster, Brion James, Kane Hodder, James C. Victor, Billy L. Sullivan, Robert O'Reilly, Brian Huckeba, and Adolfo Quinones.

== Plot ==
In 2019, a gang of bandits called the United Regime Deathriders invade the town of New Hope. They are led by General Julius 'J.W.' Quantrill (Brion James), a descendant of Confederate cavalry officer William Quantrill. A mysterious motorcycle riding gunslinger named Johnny Yuma (Joe Lara) arrives in town and joins the gang, but actually plays the thugs against each other, causing the drunken riders to shoot each other. The next morning Sarah and her son kills two other gangmembers, but the Deathriders believes Yuma is responsible. Yuma challenges his accusers to a duel and shoots all six before their guns even clear their holsters. He is chased by the rest of the gang to the tire refinery, but kills them all, including Julius Quantrill Jr. The son of General Julius 'J.W.' Quantrill.

Leaving one lone survivor, Colonel Roy Ackett (Bo Svenson) to escape so he can warn Quantrill. Most of the townsfolk flee but Sarah and a handful of people stay to help Yuma. Quantrill descends on the town with his entire army, only to find the road blocked by coffins filled with the bodies of his son and Deathriders. Enraged, he shoots Ackett with a shotgun and yells in fury "Leave noun alive". Quantrill's Deathriders enter the town, only to find it empty. The buildings, rigged with explosives, are detonated and most of Quantrill's army is destroyed. The remaining thugs converge on the town center and are attacked by armed townsfolk. Quantrill spots Yuma in a tower and sends his men after him. When they enter the tower Yuma abseils down and detonates a bomb hidden inside.

Meanwhile, Sarah's son hides in an armored school bus which is later taken by Quantrill and chased by Yuma and Sarah. After a chase, in which Yuma boards the bus and fights Quantrill, it crashes, and is then split apart by the truck Sara is driving. Yuma and Quantrill are thrown onto the road, where they lie, injured, both within reach of their guns. Yuma fires first and kills Quantrill.

Yuma loads Quantrill's corpse onto his bike and reveals he was a bounty hunter targeting Quantrill. He rides away to seek out more lawless tyrants and bandits to help rebuild the world.

== Cast ==
- Joe Lara as Johnny Yuma
- Brion James as General Julius "J.W." Quantrell
- Bo Svenson as Colonel Roy Ackett
- Stacie Foster as Sarah
- Kane Hodder as Kinton
- James C. Victor as Julius Quantrell Jr.
- Billy L. Sullivan as Lake
- Brian Huckeba as "Chickenboy"
- Jim Cody Williams as Charlie Bacchas
- Robert O'Reilly as Evermore
- Joe Hart as Greenstreet
- Adolfo Quinones as Deacon
- Bruce Ed Morrow as Precher
- Sandra Ellis Lafferty as Ada
- Paul G. Volk as Lee
- Scott McAboy as Nedleton
- Ernie Lee Banks as Wellman
- Quinn Morrison as Mayor Kissmich
- Afifi Alaouie as Shay
- Gordon Benson as Grandpa Lem
- Michael Ross Clements as Knog, Space Droid

== Reception ==
One reviewer said of the film, "Skip this movie and work on your end of the world go-bag instead."
