= Pride & Joy (TV series) =

- Created by: Marc Lawrence
- Starring: Craig Bierko; Julie Warner; Jeremy Piven; Caroline Rhea
- Composers: Jesse Frederick; Bennett Salvay
- Country of origin: United States
- Original language: English
- No. of seasons: 1
- No. of episodes: 6

Production
- Executive producer: Marc Lawrence
- Running time: 30 minutes
- Production companies: Reserve Room Productions; Touchstone Television

Original release
- Network: NBC
- Release: March 21 – May 2, 1995

Pride & Joy, is an American sitcom television series that was shown on NBC from March 21 to May 2, 1995 on Tuesday nights from 9:30 to 10:00 p.m. ET. The series revolved around a Manhattan couple, Greg and Amy Sherman (played by Craig Bierko and Julie Warner), with a newborn son, and a couple across the hall, Nathan and Carol Green (Jeremy Piven and Caroline Rhea). Reruns were then aired on Tuesday nights at 8:30 to 9:00 p.m. from June 20 to July 11, 1995. The series ended after one season.

== Cast ==
- Craig Bierko as Greg Sherman
- Julie Warner as Amy Sherman
- Jeremy Piven as Nathan Green
- Caroline Rhea as Carol Green
- Natasha Pavlović as Katya

== Episodes ==
No.	Title	Directed by	Written by	Original release date	Prod. code
1	"Pilot"	Thomas Schlamme	Marc Lawrence	March 21, 1995	001
2	"Meant to Be"	Tom Moore	Wil Calhoun	March 28, 1995	002
3	"Terror at 30,000 Feet"	Michael Lembeck	John Frink & Don Payne	April 4, 1995	003
4	"Are You My Mother?"	Tom Moore	Katie Ford	April 11, 1995	004
5	"Genius"	Arlene Sanford	Caryn Lucas & Katie Ford & Robert Borden	April 25, 1995	005
6	"Brenda's Secret"	Tom Moore	Story by : Don Payne & John Frink; Teleplay by : Leslie Eberhard	May 2, 1995	006
