= Julie St. Claire =

American actress

- Born: 1969 or 1970 (age 55–56); Geneva, New York, U.S.
- Occupations: Actress, director, producer
- Years active: 1982–2009
- Spouse: Patrick Robert Smith (1995–present)

Julie St. Claire (born 1969 or 1970) is an American actress, director, and producer.

== Career ==
A native of Geneva, New York, St. Claire is one of four children born to former stage actress Peggy Lambert. In 1982 she debuted on the NBC television series Silver Spoons, portraying Ricky Schroder's girlfriend, which led to numerous guest appearances and film roles, including Sid & Nancy (1986). The Southern California Motion Picture Council awarded her the Bronze Halo in 1983 for Best Up & Coming Young Actress; she also received a nomination for the Young Artist Award.

Her first regular television role came on Personal & Confidential. Following high school, she spent a year attending the American Academy of Dramatic Arts (West) in Pasadena on a scholarship. In 1990 she starred as Tawny Richards on the soap opera series Santa Barbara. In 1987 she was nominated for "Exceptional Performance by a Young Actress, Guest Starring in a Television, Comedy or Drama Series" for a 1986 appearance on The Judge.

== Later work ==
After Santa Barbara and along with many more film and television roles, St. Claire went on to star as Maria in UPN's A.J.'s Time Travelers and portrayed Marla Antoni on Lincoln Heights.

== Personal details ==
St. Claire lives in California with her husband, actor Patrick R. Smith, and their son. She is a member of the Hollywood Knights celebrity basketball team hall of fame and has been credited as "Julie Capone".

== See also ==
- Lima: Breaking the Silence (1999 film)
