= Lima: Breaking the Silence =

- Directed by: Menahem Golan
- Written by: Menahem Golan; Vadim Sokolovsky
- Produced by: Menahem Golan
- Starring: Joe Lara; Billy Drago
- Music by: Robert O. Ragland
- Production companies: Martien Holdings A.V..; Nu Image
- Release date: November 26, 1999 (Japan)
- Running time: 90 min
- Country: United States
- Language: English

Lima: Breaking the Silence is a 1999 American action film directed and written by Menahem Golan, starring Joe Lara and Billy Drago. The story is based on the 1996-1997 Japanese embassy hostage crisis at the Embassy of Japan in Lima, Peru.

== Cast ==
- Joe Lara as Victor
- Billy Drago as General Monticito Frantacino
- Christopher Atkins as Jeff
- Bentley Mitchum as Bruce Nelson
- Julie St. Claire as Elena

== See also ==
- Japanese embassy hostage crisis
