= The Naked Truth (1992 film) =

Comedy film by Nico Mastorakis

- Directed by: Nico Mastorakis
- Starring: Robert Caso; Kevin Schon
- Release date: 1992

The Naked Truth is a 1992 comedy film starring Robert Caso and Kevin Schon. Also featured in the film are Zsa Zsa Gabor, Lou Ferrigno, Erik Estrada, Ted Lange, Billy Barty, Yvonne De Carlo, Norman Fell, Little Richard, David Birney, M. Emmet Walsh, Dick Gautier, John Vernon, Camilla Sparv, Brian Thompson, and Natasha Pavlovich among others. It is directed by Nico Mastorakis.

== Plot ==
A take-off on the 1959 film Some Like It Hot—the film follows two men who witness a murder, dress up like women to escape, and wind up hiding in the house of a drug dealer.

== Cast ==
- Robert Caso as Frank I / Ethel
- Kevin Schon as Frank II / Mirabelle
- Courtney Gibbs as Misty Blue / Joanne
- Herb Edelman as Rupert Hess (credited as Herbert Edelman)
- Brian Thompson as Bruno
- M. Emmet Walsh as Garcia / Gesundheim
- Billy Barty as The Bell Boy
- Alex Cord as Herskovitz
- Yvonne De Carlo as Mrs. Hess
- Erik Estrada as Gonzales
- Norman Fell as Dentist
- Lou Ferrigno as Fed #1
- David Birney as Fed #2
- Dick Gautier as The Bartender
- Ted Lange as Flower Peddler
- Little Richard as Airborne Mustard Lover
- Bubba Smith as Cop
- Zsa Zsa Gabor as Stewardess
- Shannon Tweed as First Class Stewardess
- John Vernon as Von Bulo
- Shelley Michelle as Miss Honduras
- Julie Gray as Miss Hungary
- Lisa Altamirano as Miss Spain
- Cindy Ambuehl as Miss Italy
- Donna Baltron as Miss Cuba
- Penelope Crabtree as Miss Poland
- Natasha Pavlovich as Miss Bolivia
- Kelly Fine as Miss Iraq
- Maureen Flaherty as Miss Romania
- Andrea Parker as Miss France
- Spice Williams-Crosby as Samantha "Sam" (credited as Spice Williams)
- Jamee Natella as Waitress
- Sia Faraki as Girl On Plane

== Release ==
The movie made its premiere on Cinemax on May 3, 1993. The film did not arrive on any format until 1999, when Simitar Video released the film onto DVD. In 2003, Omega Entertainment through Image Entertainment released an extended version of the film onto DVD.
