= Christian diet programs =

Eating practices to promote health

Christian diet programs are books and other name-brand products promoting weight-loss diets and other diets that the authors believe are consistent with Christian rules and values. They may borrow elements from Jewish dietary laws, the Bible, modern nutrition science, or other sources. Christian diet and exercise programs became popular in the 1970s. They differ from historical, non-commercial Christian dietary traditions, such as not eating meat on Fridays.

Annual revenues in excess of US$1 billion have been estimated for the US market. Christian diet books have been bestsellers in the US religion market. Some have complex marketing programs, with spinoffs, in-person meetings, commercially produced dietary supplements, and other ways to generate revenue.

== Characteristics ==
Most Christian diet programs are calorie-reduction and exercise programs that have a veneer of Christian behavior over the surface. Exercise classes feature contemporary Christian music instead of secular music. Group meetings begin and end in prayer, and books include Bible verses. Within that context, they can be further subdivided into two categories:

- programs following some form of typical diet and exercise advice, with the addition of spiritual advice, such as to pray when tempted to eat too much food or to skip exercise, and
- programs advocating for an idyllic ancient diet, reminiscent of the Garden of Eden.

Christian diet programs allow adherents to engage in a secular activity (weight loss) with a secular goal (becoming thin or attractive) while maintaining a distinctive religious cultural identity. This happens through a process of cooptation or cultural appropriation of exercise and dieting from the secular culture. In style and substance, Christian diet programs influence and are influenced by the evangelical Christian community, secular views on weight loss, the medical and scientific community's approaches to health and fitness, and non-Christian fitness and dieting programs, including yoga. For example, some Christian diet programs promote their medical and scientific content, and some secular diet programs have begun promoting weight loss as a spiritual act.

== Blaming individuals ==
Early Christian diet programs emphasized the overweight person's sin and guilt. Over time, Christian programs changed their message away from guilt and fat shaming towards treating overeating as a type of addiction or psychological problem. This shift mirrored the changes in secular diet and fitness books at the same time.

Also like non-religious diet programs, the Christian diet authors associate being overweight with individual character flaws and a lack of self-control, rather than systemic factors associated with poor diet, over-consumption of food, and a sedentary lifestyle. (Examples of systemic factors related to obesity include government policy decisions that make driving more common than biking or walking, or that subsidize the production of refined sugar and grains instead of fresh fruits and vegetables.)

Secular weight-loss programs often ascribe overeating to the person feeling empty in some way, such as having an unfulfilling social or emotional life. The main difference between these programs and Christian weight-loss programs is that the person's emptiness is believed to be spiritual in nature.

== Theology ==
Christian diet programs tend to be associated with evangelicalism in the United States but with no particular Christian denomination.

Many Christian diet programs are associated with the health and wealth gospel idea, and treat health as a primary end goal, rather than as means for living out Christian values. In this mindset, being healthy and thin, rather than Christian values such as love, becomes a "new measuring tape for godliness and spirituality". Some Christian diet programs are "alarmingly close to depicting a God who loves a size six woman more than a size 16".

Most mainstream diet programs support hegemonic standards for external beauty. This is the idea that there is one best type of physical appearance, which is thin for women and muscular for men. Christian diet programs disclaim this, encourage the development of inner beauty, and warn their adherents against vanity and pursuing external beauty. They emphasize that adherents should undertake their diet and exercise programs with the correct motivations, which are for physical, emotional, and spiritual health.

Christian diet programs promote the idea that the human body is a temple that must be kept holy. They have been criticized for then equating having a thin, physically beautiful body with being holy and righteous. A commonly cited Bible verse is 1 Corinthians 6:19–20, which Christian diet programs say means that it is sinful to be overweight. Critics interpret this differently, such as by saying that people should try to be healthy, or that people should honor God regardless of their appearance.

== Programs ==
List of Christian diet programs
| Program | Brief description | Commercial products |
|---|---|---|
| The Maker's Diet by Jordan S. Rubin | 40-day temporary food plan based on whole, unprocessed foods, especially vegetables, fruits, and raw nuts, and fasting for half a day once a week. Rubin recommends avoiding the meat of unclean animals. The tone of the books has been compared to an infomercial. Rubin's two private companies, Garden of Life and Beyond Organic, have sold tens of millions of dollars' worth of dietary supplements and other products. They have been the subject of FDA enforcement actions for making unsubstantiated claims. | Books, dietary supplements, soap, dentifrice |
| What Would Jesus Eat? by Don Colbert | This book promotes the modern Mediterranean diet as being similar to what people in Israel during the first century, including the historical Jesus, would likely have eaten. | Book |
| Losing to Live by Steve Reynolds | A 12-week fitness and counseling program that promotes exercise and healthy foods. It uses one of the Ten Commandments, Thou shalt have no other gods before me, to position overeating as a form of idolatry. The program is a weight-loss competition. The founder has also written several books, including one titled Bod4God. | Weekly in-person meetings, books |
| Weigh Down Workshop by Gwen Shamblin | This program was most popular in the 1990s, when its popularity in the US was close to that of some secular weight-loss programs. It addressed weight loss in the context of food addiction. In 2000, the founder disclaimed belief in the orthodox Christian views of the Trinity, resulting in the loss of publishing contracts and accusations that she is a cult leader and a heretic. | Books, in-person meetings, website, church |
| Prayer walk | This is a generic, rather than name-brand program. Participants walk while praying. This combines gentle physical exercise with praying in a particular place. | Books, DVDs, online groups, in-person groups |
| Praise Aerobics by Sheri Chambers | An example of exercise programs, this aerobics video program sold 50,000 copies in 1996, equal to a gold record for music videos. | VHS tape |
| Free to Be Thin by Neva Coyle and Marie Chapian | This 13-week program is one of the more popular. It opposes fad diets, junk food, and artificial diet foods. Later, after Coyle regained the weight she had once lost, she promoted exercise and other healthful habits for obese women, without weight loss as a goal. | Books |
| Pray Your Weight Away by Charles Shedd | One of the first modern weight loss books marketed as a Christian approach to dieting, this was published in 1957. Shedd later published two more blunt-spoken, fat-shaming, best-selling books about overeating as evidence of spiritual and personal failures. | Books |
| Body and Soul Aerobics | This in-person exercise class is promoted to churches as way of recruiting new church members. | |
| Hallelujah Diet by George Malkmus | This diet is largely raw foodism, which Malkmus claims was the diet in the Garden of Eden. Malkmus also objects to modern medical interventions, such as surgery. | Books, dietary supplements, household products |
| 3D Plan by Carol Showalter | This diet program is named after three areas of emphasis: individual discipline, diet, and discipleship. This program promotes medical and scientific advice about the health benefits of having a normal body mass index (BMI). | Books |
| WholyFit | Framed as a Bible study about health and fitness. | Exercise classes and videos |
| First Place 4 Health | Framed as a Bible study about health and fitness. | Books, in-person meetings, household products, online groups |
| The Daniel Plan by Rick Warren, Daniel Amen, and Mark Hyman | 40-day plan based on the story of Daniel eating vegetables and water instead of meat and wine. | Books, videos, in-person meetings, online group |

== See also ==
- List of diets
- Disability and religion § Christianity
