= Cessna Citation I =

Business jet manufactured 1971–1985

Citation I / I/SP
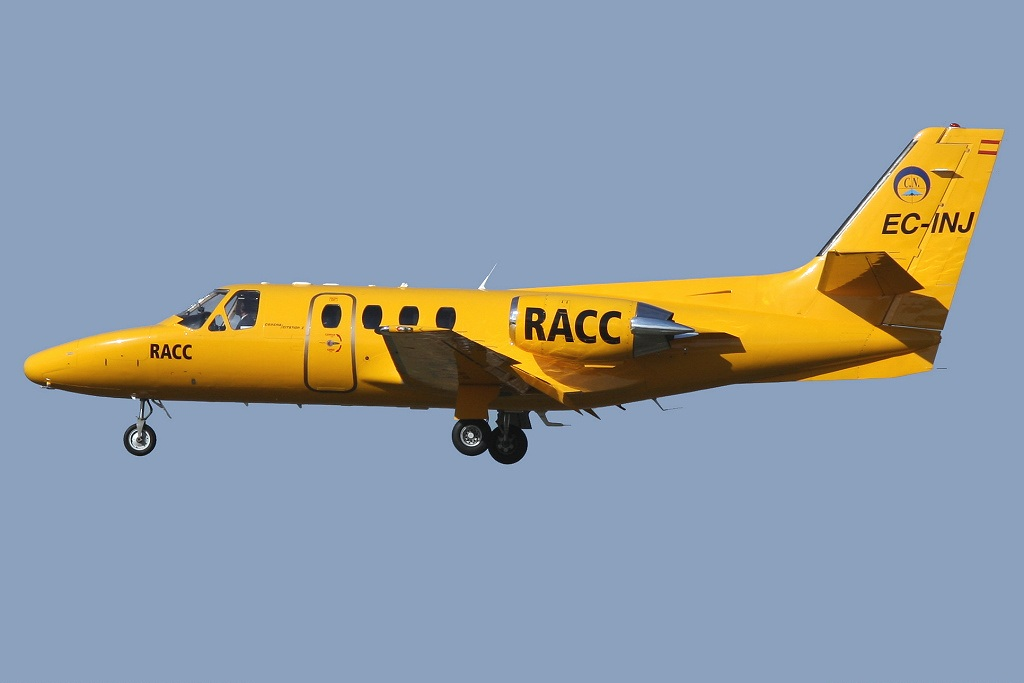
- A Citation I/SP

General information
- Type: Corporate jet
- National origin: United States
- Manufacturer: Cessna
- Number built: 689, 688 delivered

History
- Manufactured: 1971–1985
- First flight: September 15, 1969 (FanJet 500)
- Developed into: Cessna Citation II

The Cessna 500 Citation I is a small business jet designed and produced by Cessna. It was the first business jet to be designed for single-pilot operations. The Citation I became the basis of the Citation family.

Originally marketed at the Fanjet 500 and intentionally designed to cater towards Cessna's traditional customer base of personal owner-pilots, the existence of the program was announced in October 1968. The prototype, equipped with a straight wing and powered by a pair of JT15D turbofan engines, performed its maiden flight on September 15, 1969, and it was type certified as the 500 Citation on September 9, 1971. Development of the type continued through the 1970s, leading to the Citation I being introduced in 1976 as well as the 501 Citation I/SP single-pilot variant becoming available in 1977. Production of the Citation I was terminated in 1985, by which point 689 aircraft across all variants had been produced. The Citation I was further developed into the Citation II.

== Development ==
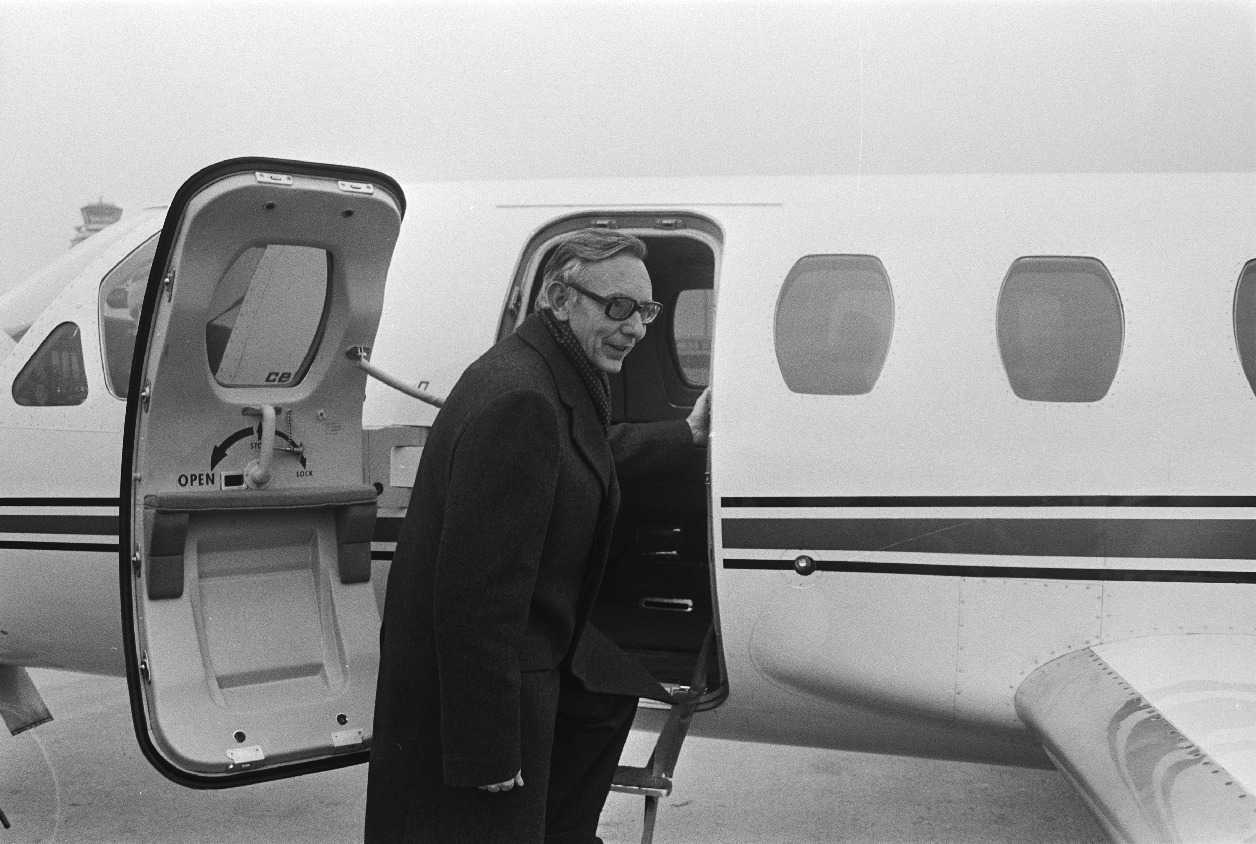
Netherlands minister Max van der Stoel boarding in 1975

In the early 1960s, the three major American general aviation aircraft manufacturers—Beechcraft, Cessna and Piper–faced a competitive challenge in the form of two newly-developed light business jets, the Learjet 23 and the Aero Commander 1121 Jet Commander, which were much less expensive to buy and operate than previous business jets, such as the North American Sabreliner and Hawker Siddeley HS.125. Previous efforts by Beechcraft and Cessna to market small jets had not met with success: the Cessna 407, a proposed civil version of the T-37 Tweet jet trainer, had not proceeded past the mockup stage due to insufficient customer interest, while an effort by Beechcraft to market the Morane-Saulnier MS.760 Paris in North America had ended with only two aircraft sold. However, the runaway success of the Learjet caused the two companies—which only manufactured piston engined aircraft at the time—to reconsider turbine engined aircraft, and Beechcraft launched two simultaneous efforts: the development of the turboprop-powered King Air 90 and an agreement to market the HS.125 in North America.

Cessna quickly found that its premium twin piston-engine aircraft were uncompetitive with the King Air, which was substantially faster, yet could be flown by pilots with similar skills and licensing qualifications. However, the company also saw a broad gap between the King Air and existing light jets such as the Learjet, which were far faster but also relatively unforgiving to fly, requiring highly skilled pilots and long runways. Cessna reasoned that a market existed for a light jet that was faster than the King Air but similarly easy to fly, relatively inexpensive to buy and maintain, and able to access small airports with shorter runways. This type of aircraft would appeal to traditional Cessna buyers: amateur owner-pilots who intend to fly the aircraft themselves.

In October 1968, Cessna announced an eight place business jet capable of operating from airfields accessible to light twins, dispensing with the need for substantial commercial runways and considerable technical experience of its operators. Reactions to the aircraft were mixed, detractors often pointed towards the aircraft's relatively low speed for a jet as being a disadvantage against competitors. Furthermore, the development program would prove to be an expensive pursuit, reportedly ultimately costing $35 million, roughly half the company's total value.

The Fanjet 500 prototype conducted its maiden flight on September 15, 1969. By then its unit cost was $695,000, $6.1M today. Rebranded at the 500 Citation, it had a relatively lengthy development program, featuring a longer forward fuselage, repositioned engine nacelles, an enlarged tail unit and greater dihedral on the horizontal tailplane. While Cessna were keen for its first civilian jet to be approved for a single-person operation, the Federal Aviation Administration (FAA) were originally reluctant to issue single-pilot certification until sufficient operational experience had been built up. The 500 Citation received type certification from the FAA on September 9, 1971.

In 1974, thrust reversers became optional, and in 1976, the gross weight was increased by 1,000 pounds (450 kg) to 10,850 pounds (4,920 kg). In early 1976, the wingspan was increased from 43.9 to 47.1 ft (13.4 to 14.4 m). The enhanced 500 Citation I was introduced later in 1976 with the higher gross weight, improved JT15D-1A engines and the increased span wing. Speed and range were enhanced, the aircraft's service ceiling increased from 35,000 to 41,000 feet (11,000 to 12,000 m), and the cabin pressure at altitude was increased from 7.6 to 8.6 psi (52 to 59 kPa). Many of the original Citations, of which 349 were produced, were upgraded with the new engines. The 501 Citation I/SP, certificated for single pilot operations, was delivered in early 1977. Production ended in 1985, it was developed into the Citation II/Bravo and the Citation V/Ultra/Encore. 395 Citations and Citation Is and 296 I/SPs were built between 1971 and 1985. The aircraft were dropped from production because JT15D engine prices had increased to the point that the price difference between the Citation I and Citation II series had become minimal, causing most buyers to opt for the larger and faster II and II/SP.

By 2018, used 1970s model 500s were valued at $300,000, Citation ISPs at $695,000 to $1.25 million with the Eagle II package.

== Design ==
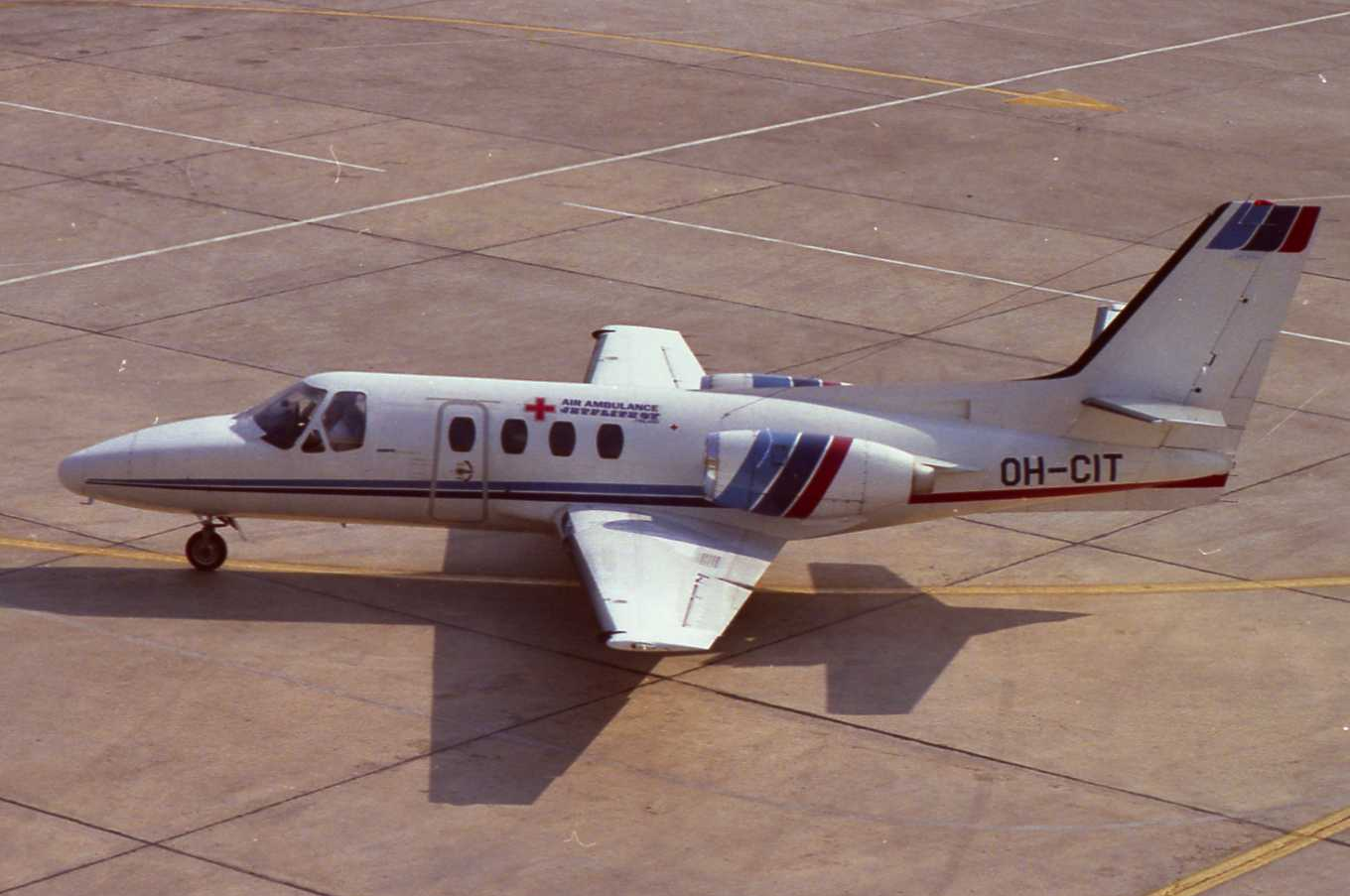
The Citation I has a low straight wing and two aft JT15D turbofans.

The Cessna Citation I is a compact business jet designed to suit individual owner-operators; to this end, it is equipped with relatively simplistic systems and possessed fairly docile handling characteristics. From the onset, the Citation I was furnished with avionics intended to facilitate single-pilot operations, although it was not initially certified to conduct such operations. Visually distinctive features include its somewhat bulbous nose, straight wing, and cruciform tail.

Power is provided by a pair of Pratt & Whitney Canada JT15D-1 turbofan engines. The Citation I's use of turbofans rather than turbojets, as well as the fitting of straight wings rather than swept wings, made it cruise slowly compared to other business jets and Learjet salesmen mocked it as the "Nearjet" vulnerable to "bird strikes from the rear"; Cessna renamed it the "Citation" after the thoroughbred but it was nicknamed as "Slowtation". Those aircraft fitted with thrust reversers and extended wings were capable of landing substantially shorter runways than those that lacked these features.

Several retrofit programs have been operated for the Citation I. One such modification package, involving the fitting of more powerful Williams FJ44 turbofans, auxiliary fuel tanks, and remanufactured wings, enables the aircraft to fly at greater speeds, higher altitudes, and for longer distances. Interior-focused changes can include the addition of a baggage compartment, an aft divan and a sofa in the forward portion of the cabin. Avionics-centric upgrades potentially include the fitting of a glass cockpit.

== Operators ==
=== Government and Military operators ===
Angola

- National Air Force of Angola

Argentina

- Argentine Army
- Argentine Federal Police

China

- People's Liberation Army Air Force

Dominican Republic

- Dominican Republic Air Force

Ecuador

- Ecuadorian Navy

Mexico

- Mexican Air Force

Venezuela

- Venezuelan Air Force

== Accidents and incidents ==
Notable accidents and incidents involving the Citation 500, Citation I and Citation I/SP:

- On August 2, 1979, New York Yankees player Thurman Munson was killed when his Citation I/SP, aircraft registration number N15NY, crashed short of the runway during touch-and-go landing practice at Akron-Canton Airport; the crash and post-crash fire destroyed the aircraft while Munson's two passengers escaped with serious injuries. The National Transportation Safety Board (NTSB) attributed the accident to Munson's failure to lower the flaps and maintain adequate airspeed.
- On March 30, 2008, a Citation I/SP, registration VP-BGE, crashed near Biggin Hill Airport, killing former racing drivers David Leslie and Richard Lloyd, the two pilots, and another passenger, and causing a fire that destroyed two houses struck by the aircraft. The accident was attributed to the flight crew's improper emergency procedures in reaction to a perceived engine fault.
- On October 13, 2016, a Citation 500, registration C-GTNG, crashed shortly after takeoff from Kelowna International Airport, killing former Premier of Alberta Jim Prentice, the pilot, and two other passengers. The Transportation Safety Board of Canada (TSB) was unable to conclusively determine the cause of the crash, but the flight profile was consistent with a spiral dive caused by spatial disorientation, and the pilot's lack of experience flying at night and in instrument meteorological conditions were thought to have contributed. The TSB also noted that although the aircraft had been outfitted for single-pilot operations in accordance with Transport Canada (TC) regulations, the operator lacked the required TC approval for single-pilot flights, and the TSB criticized TC for lax operator oversight.
- On May 29, 2021, a Citation 501, registration N66BK, crashed into Percy Priest Lake shortly after takeoff from Smyrna Airport, killing American author Gwen Shamblin Lara and her husband, American actor Joe Lara, along with five other leaders of the Remnant Fellowship Church. The NTSB investigation determined the cause of the accident was pilot error related to somatogravic illusion (a type of spatial disorientation), due to heavy cloud cover.

== Specifications (Cessna Citation I) ==
Data from Jane's Civil and Military Aircraft Upgrades 1994-95

General characteristics

- Crew: Two (One pilot on I/SP)
- Capacity: Up to five passengers (dependent on configuration)
- Length: 43 ft 6 in (13.26 m)
- Wingspan: 47 ft 1 in (14.35 m)
- Height: 14 ft 4 in (4.37 m)
- Wing area: 278.5 sq ft (25.87 m^{2})
- Aspect ratio: 7.83:1
- Empty weight: 6,631 lb (3,008 kg)
- Max takeoff weight: 11,850 lb (5,375 kg)
- Fuel capacity: 564 US gal (470 imp gal; 2,130 L) usable fuel
- Powerplant: 2 × Pratt & Whitney Canada JT15D-1B turbofans, 2,200 lbf (9.8 kN) thrust each

Performance(above 28,000 ft (8,500 m)

- Maximum speed: Mach 0.705
- Cruise speed: 357 kn (411 mph, 661 km/h) at 35,000 ft (11,000 m)
- Stall speed: 82 kn (94 mph, 152 km/h) (CAS)
- Range: 1,328 nmi (1,528 mi, 2,459 km) at 41,000 ft (12,000 m) (45 minute reserves, 1,562 lb (709 kg) payload)
- Service ceiling: 41,000 ft (12,000 m)
- Rate of climb: 2,719 ft/min (13.81 m/s)

== See also ==
Related development

- Cessna Citation series
- Cessna Citation II

Aircraft of comparable role, configuration, and era

- Aérospatiale Corvette
- Dassault Falcon 10
- HFB 320 Hansa Jet
- Learjet 25
