= Marie Chapian =

American writer

- Other names: Marie Chapian; Marie Jordan; Marie Giordano

Marie Chapian (also known as Marie Giordano and Marie Jordan) is an American writer and radio ministry host. She is known for her writings on Christian diet programs, Christian devotional literature, and co-authoring biographies.

== Career ==
Chapian is known for her Christian writings, health and fitness writings, and co-authoring autobiographies. She has also written one novel, I love you like a tomato which she published as Marie Giordano. She has written a series of books about Christian diet programs, including Free to Be Thin that she co-authored with Neva Coyle in 1979. A second edition, All new free to be thin was published in 1994, along with There's more to being thin than being thin. She created the Blessercize aerobics video, Fun To Be Fit, which is set to Christian music. Chapian has written Christian devotional books, including Mothers & daughters and His thoughts towards me that was published in English and Russian. In 1988 she won a Gold Medallion book award from the Evangelical Christian Publishers Association for her book Am I the only one here with faded genes?. She has won the Cornerstone Book of the Year Award and a Silver Angel Award.

Chapian has co-authored biographies. Cathleen Mae Webb agreed to write a book with Chapian about why she withdrew her charges of rape and kidnapping against Gary Dotson. The resulting book, Forgive Me, was published in 1985. She also co-authored books with Gavin MacLeod and Robert Sadler.

== Selected publications ==
- Chapian, Marie (1979). Free to be thin. Neva Coyle. Minneapolis, Minn.: Bethany House Publishers. ISBN 0-87123-560-9. OCLC 9784519.
- Webb, Cathleen Crowell (1985). Forgive me. Marie Chapian. Old Tappan, N.J.: F.H. Revell Co. ISBN 0-8007-1462-8. OCLC 12724445.
- Giordano, Marie (2004). I love you like a tomato (1st ed.). New York: Tom Doherty Associates. ISBN 0-7653-4588-9. OCLC 54931313.
- Chaplain, Marie (1978). Of Whom the World Was Not Worthy. Bethany House Publishing. ISBN 0-87123-250-2.
