= 2021 Tennessee Cessna Citation crash =

Plane crash in Tennessee

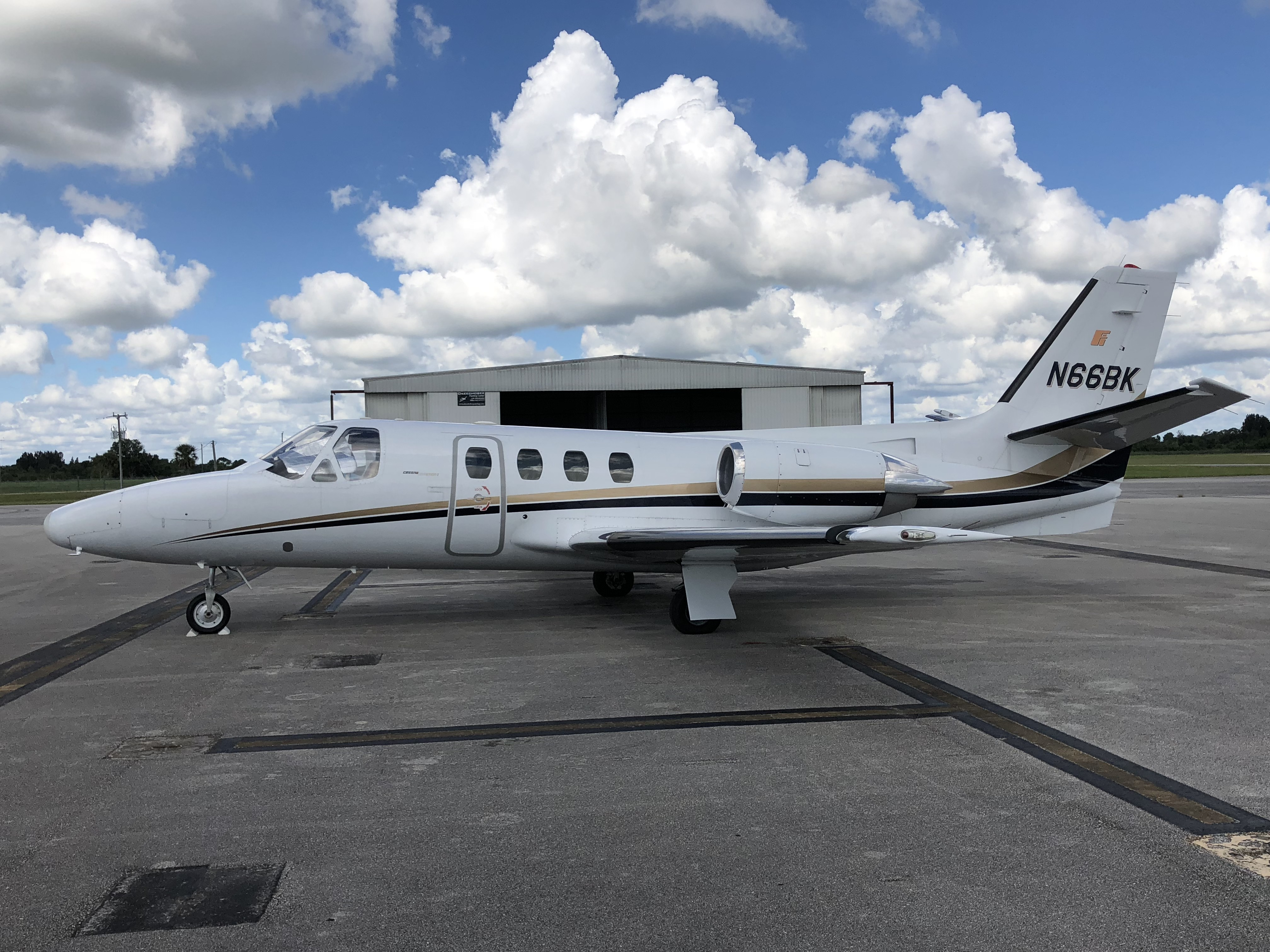
- N66BK, the aircraft involved in the accident, in 2018

Accident
- Date: 29 May 2021
- Summary: Loss of control during climb
- Site: Percy Priest Lake, Tennessee, United States; 36.156°N 86.613°W

Aircraft
- Aircraft type: Cessna 501 Citation I/SP
- Operator: JL&GL Productions LP
- Registration: N66BK
- Flight origin: Smyrna Airport, Rutherford County, Tennessee, United States
- Destination: Palm Beach International Airport, Palm Beach County, Florida, United States
- Occupants: 7
- Passengers: 6
- Crew: 1
- Fatalities: 7
- Survivors: 0

On 29 May 2021, a Cessna 501 Citation I/SP crashed into the Percy Priest Lake in Tennessee, United States shortly after takeoff from Smyrna Airport (MQY) in Smyrna, Tennessee. All seven occupants died, including Remnant Fellowship Church founder Gwen Shamblin Lara and her husband, actor Joe Lara, who was piloting the aircraft.

== Accident ==
The aircraft took off from Smyrna Airport in Smyrna, Tennessee, at 10:53 a.m. for a planned Federal Aviation Regulations Part 91 personal flight to Palm Beach International Airport. After takeoff, the aircraft started a right turn and climbed to an altitude of 2,900 ft (880 m) before descending to 1,800 ft (550 m), climbing again to 3,000 ft (910 m), and then descending into the lake, two minutes and one second after departure.

The Federal Aviation Administration (FAA) stated that seven people were on board.

Witnesses on the lake reported that the aircraft impacted the water near the Fate Sanders Recreation Area. Authorities secured a debris field, and an oil sheen was observed at the site.

At an evening press conference on May 29, Captain Joshua Sanders of the Rutherford County Fire Department stated that, after search operations on the lake since 11:00 a.m., the response had shifted from rescue to recovery.

Dive teams from Rutherford County Fire & Rescue, the Metro Nashville Office of Emergency Management, the Metro Nashville Police Department, and the Wilson County Emergency Management Agency recovered several components of the aircraft and human remains.

In addition to water-based operations, authorities operated drones to search for debris that might have drifted from the crash site.

Drone operations continued over the debris field, and air traffic was restricted within a 1-nautical-mile (1.9 km) radius of the site up to 500 ft altitude.

Retired FAA inspector Larry Williams stated that the event occurred too quickly for the pilot to issue a distress call.

=== Weather conditions ===
Weather reports indicated the presence of an overcast cloud layer at 1,300 ft (400 m) in the area at the time.

== Victims ==
All seven aircraft occupants were killed, including actor Joe Lara, his wife Gwen Shamblin Lara, and her son-in-law.

Gwen Shamblin Lara founded the Weigh Down Workshop, a Christian-oriented weight-loss program, and later established Remnant Fellowship Church, of which all the victims were members. Joe Lara portrayed Tarzan in the television series Tarzan: The Epic Adventures and in the 1989 television film Tarzan in Manhattan. In total, he had 28 acting credits.

== Rescue efforts ==
U.S. authorities examined the crash site while conducting search-and-rescue operations. They requested that the public avoid the area and sought civilian assistance.

Firefighters and other rescue teams were deployed to the scene. After an overnight operation, authorities reported that all occupants were deceased and that next of kin had been notified.

Captain Joshua Sanders stated that crews had ended search-and-rescue operations and were conducting recovery operations at the crash site.

He stated that divers planned to resume search operations on the morning of May 30, 2021.

By June 1, 2021, search teams had recovered both engines, substantial sections of the fuselage, and additional human remains. Authorities had identified the seven victims, but at the time, it remained unclear who was flying the aircraft when it crashed.

== Aircraft ==
The aircraft involved, owned by JL&GL Productions LP, was a Cessna 501 Citation I (serial number 501-0254), registered as N66BK. It was equipped with two Pratt & Whitney Canada JT15D-1B turbofan engines. When the aircraft was last inspected, it had accumulated 4781.4 hours. The aircraft was manufactured in 1982, and had its maiden flight the same year.

== Investigation ==
By 1 June 2021, searchers had recovered both aircraft engines, a significant portion of the fuselage, and unidentified human remains. Authorities had named the seven victims, all of whom were leaders at the Remnant Fellowship Church.

The National Transportation Safety Board (NTSB) deployed a lead investigator to the site on May 30, 2021, and assumed responsibility for the investigation. The Federal Aviation Administration and local authorities assisted. The NTSB also engaged Cessna and other parties to support the investigation.

Media reports identified Joe Lara and another occupant as pilots. According to FAA certification records cited by USA Today, Lara’s medical certificate had expired and the other man did not hold the required type rating for the Citation I.

On June 1, Remnant Fellowship Church presented an apparent valid medical certificate for Lara to the FAA. The aviation medical examiner named on the certificate declined to confirm its authenticity and referred inquiries to the FAA, which stated that its medical-certificate database is current and “generally accurate” and deferred further questions to the NTSB.

Aviation International News reported that Lara held a valid medical certificate and that both pilots possessed multi-engine and instrument ratings.

On 22 March 2023, the National Transportation Safety Board (NTSB) determined that the cause of the accident was "the pilot's loss of airplane control during climb due to spatial disorientation." Flight tracking data revealed that after takeoff, the aircraft entered clouds at 1,300 ft (400m) and made a series of heading changes, along with several climbs and descents, before it entered a steep, descending left turn. Accelerations associated with the airplane’s increasing airspeed were likely perceived by the pilot as the airplane pitching up although it was in a continuous descent. This occurred because Lara was experiencing a type of spatial disorientation, a somatogravic illusion, and he probably did not effectively use his instruments during takeoff and climb. As a result, Lara most likely experienced a high workload managing the flight profile, which would have had a negative effect on his performance. As such, the airplane entered a high acceleration, unusual attitude, descending left turn from which he was not able to recover.

The NTSB investigation reviewed Lara's pilot training in the CE-500-type aircraft and reported that at the end of a 12-day series of training sessions at a flight school in January 2020, "the pilot did not meet the requisite performance level to attempt the CE-500 type rating check ride." Lara returned to his local instructor for more training and subsequently passed his check ride. Nonetheless, a pilot who flew in the accident aircraft with Lara on several occasions judged him to be "weak" when flying in instrument meteorological conditions.
