= Gwen Shamblin Lara =

American dietitian and cult leader (1955–2021)

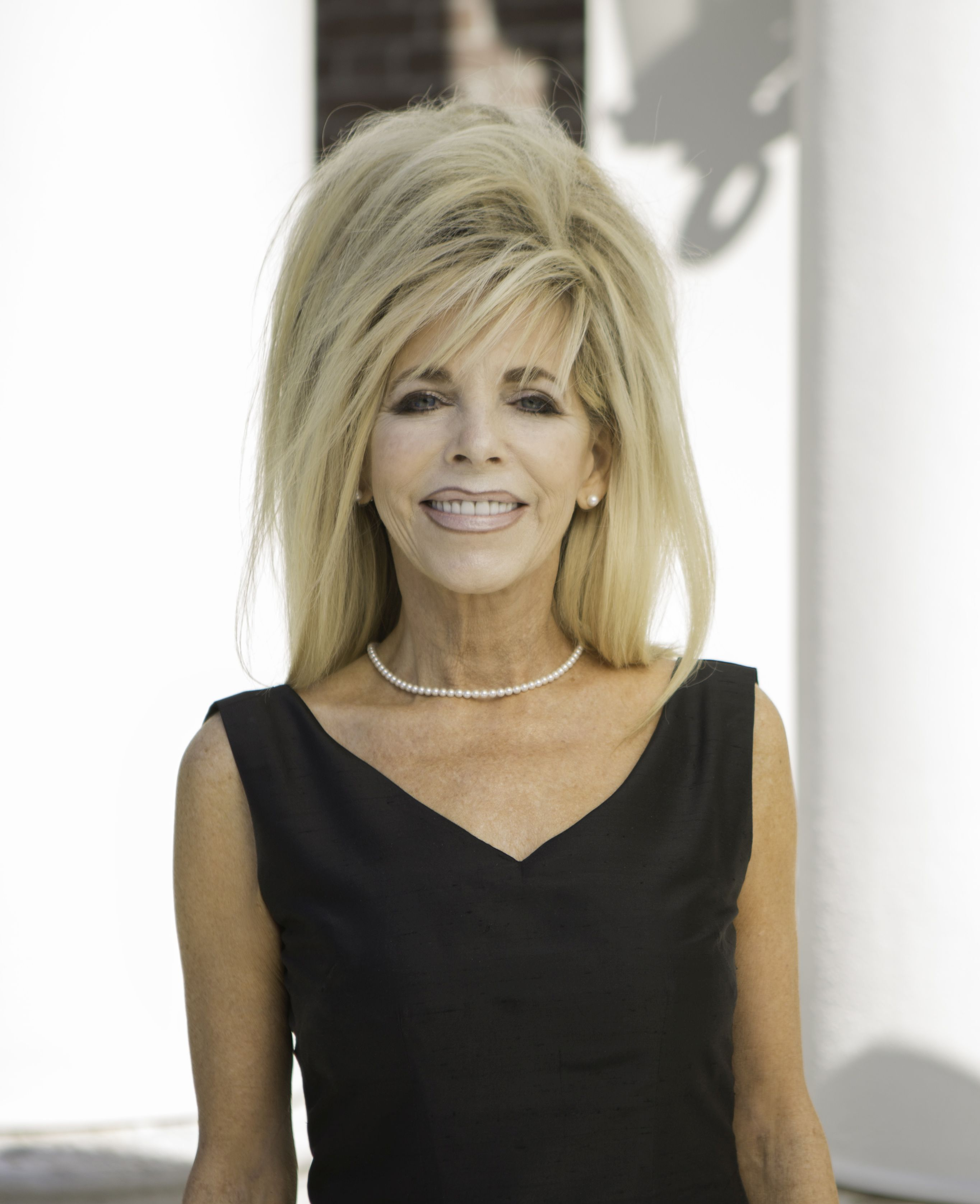
- Lara in 2018
- Born: Gwendolyn Kay Henley; February 18, 1955; Memphis, Tennessee, U.S.
- Died: May 29, 2021 (aged 66); Percy Priest Lake, Tennessee, U.S.
- Other name: Gwen Shamblin
- Occupations: Author; Dietitian
- Spouses: David Shamblin (m. 1978; div. 2018) Joe Lara (m. 2018; died 2021)
- Children: 2
- Writing career
- Education: University of Tennessee
- Genres: Self-help; non-fiction; Christian literature
- Website: www.gwenshamblinlara.com

Gwendolyn Kay Shamblin Lara (née Henley; February 18, 1955 – May 29, 2021) was an American church leader known for the Weigh Down Workshop, her Christian dieting program. She founded Remnant Fellowship Church in 1999 and oversaw its ministry until her 2021 death in a plane crash together with her husband Joe Lara, who was the pilot, and five other Remnant Fellowship leaders.

Shamblin founded the Weigh Down Workshop in 1986 as a registered dietitian in Memphis. The program grew to 30,000 participating churches in fifteen years and expanded into product sales and Shamblin's 1997 book, The Weigh Down Diet. Shamblin was criticized for lavish personal spending using proceeds from the ministry.

Remnant Fellowship has been compared to a cult and has been criticized by other Christian groups for denying the doctrine of the Trinity. It has been accused of encouraging corporal punishment and was raided by authorities investigating the death of eight-year-old Josef Smith, whose parents Joseph and Sonya Smith were convicted in 2007 of child abuse and murder. Shamblin and church members publicly supported and paid for the legal defense of the Smiths, who attended Remnant Fellowship. A docuseries on Shamblin, The Way Down: God, Greed, and the Cult of Gwen Shamblin, was released on Max in 2021.

Shamblin died on May 29, 2021, when her private jet crashed into Percy Priest Lake.

== Early life ==
Shamblin was born Gwendolyn Kay Henley on February 18, 1955 in Memphis, Tennessee to Walter H. Henley (1926–1981), a general surgeon and Betty (née McNeil; born 1929) Lawrence. She was the second youngest of four children with an older brother, an older sister, and a younger brother. Shamblin along with her siblings were raised in a Church of Christ family. She earned an undergraduate degree in dietetics and a master's degree in food and nutrition with an emphasis in biochemistry from University of Tennessee, in Knoxville. In college, Shamblin says she struggled with her weight. She worked as a registered dietitian, consultant and a faculty member at Memphis State University for five years, and began a weight control consulting practice in 1980. She also worked in the city's Tennessee Department of Health.

== Weigh Down Workshop ==
Shamblin developed a faith-oriented weight-loss program while earning her master's degree at Memphis State University, and founded the Weigh Down Workshop in 1986. Shamblin counseled that genetics and behavior modification were not enough explanation for why some people were overweight, and hosted the first class in a mall in Memphis with a strong focus on faith and prayer. The program did not require exercise, calorie-counting, weigh-ins, or food restrictions. It developed into a 12-week seminar guided by video and audio tapes featuring Shamblin. Some experts raised concern over its deviations from American Dietetic Association guidance.

The Weigh Down Workshop expanded rapidly in the 1990s, with Shamblin hosting a Memphis-area program at Bellevue Baptist Church and many other churches and homes hosting programs simultaneously. By 1994, it was offered in about 600 churches in 35 US states, and by January 1995 it reached more than 1,000 churches in 49 states plus Canada and the UK. By July 1996, the Weigh Down Workshop was in about 5,000 churches, 10 percent of them in Tennessee.

Weigh Down Workshop had a staff of 40 in 1996. The company built a headquarters in Franklin, Tennessee, and Shamblin began hosting an annual summer convention in the Nashville area called Desert Oasis. By August 1998, it had more than 250,000 participants in more than 21,000 classes across Europe, Canada, and every US state.

=== Writing ===
Shamblin published the 1997 book The Weigh Down Diet, which advised readers to cut food portions in half, eat only when hungry, and transfer the desire for food into love of God. The book sold more than 1.2 million copies and led to further publishing deals.

=== Finances ===
Shamblin was criticized for branding the Weigh Down Workshop as a Christian ministry while profiting significantly and living a lavish lifestyle, driving multiple BMWs and a Mercedes and purchasing a $2.3 million mansion. When a WTVF reporter asked in 2001 how much money Shamblin was making, she said the amount was "between me and God". On Larry King Live, she said the Weigh Down Workshop devoted half its proceeds to taxes and put the other half back into the program.

== Remnant Fellowship Church ==
Shamblin founded the Remnant Fellowship Church in Franklin, Tennessee in 1999. In 2004, the church moved into a new building that had been constructed on 40 acres of land purchased by Shamblin in Brentwood, Tennessee.

Shamblin sent an email to her followers saying that she believed that the doctrine of the Trinity was not Biblical on August 10, 2000. In response, some evangelical churches dropped her program, Thomas Nelson Publishers canceled the publication of her next book, she was removed from the Women of Faith website, and some employees left her staff.

Shamblin had preached that members should give their money to the Remnant Fellowship church, the only true church, and that all other churches were fraudulent. Remnant Fellowship was compared to a cult.

After her death in 2021, Shamblin's children Michael Shamblin and Elizabeth Shamblin Hannah stated in June 2021 that they will both continue to lead Remnant Fellowship and continue their mother's legacy. November the same year, Michael left the church and was no longer involved in Remnant Fellowship's operations. This left Elizabeth as the church's sole leader.

In a February 2024 interview, Michael Shamblin described the organisation as a cult.

On November 24, 2025, Michael Shamblin compared the church to Scientology due to repeated incidents of harassment, stalking, and threats from church leadership toward current and ex-members.

=== Remnant Fellowship Church productions ===
Shamblin began producing a live Internet show, You Can Overcome, in October 2011 which was filmed in the church.

On September 9, 2019, Gwen and her husband Joe began a Youtube series entitled Life with Gwen and Joe. The final episode entitled "Honoring the Christian Martyrs" was released on November 20, 2020.

== Associations with corporal punishment ==
Shamblin has been accused of promoting corporal punishment. She and other Remnant Fellowship members paid for the legal defense of adherents Joseph and Sonya Smith, who were ultimately convicted of child abuse and murder of their eight-year-old son Josef.

On October 8, 2003, the Smiths punished Josef by placing him in a small wicker box with electrical cords wrapped around the outside holding the lid closed. They then watched an online service from Remnant Fellowship, after which they opened the box and found Josef braindead. County medical examiners concluded that the child died as a result of "acute and chronic" abuse. The Smiths routinely beat Josef with foot-long glue sticks, belts, and heated coat hangers. Police reported that the couple locked Josef in his room for days or weeks, providing a bucket for bodily waste and a picture of Jesus on the ceiling for him to pray to. Another child in the family, Milek Smith, died 11 weeks before Josef's death, with the cause of death reported variously as pneumonia or SIDS.

During the investigation of the death, authorities conducted a raid of Remnant Fellowship due to its teachings on child discipline. Church members created a website to advocate the Smiths' innocence, suggesting Josef died of a bacterial infection and that his own skin markings came from scratching his own eczema. Georgia v. Smith resulted in the Smiths' conviction in February 2007, and they were sentenced to life plus 30 years in prison on March 27, 2007, the maximum punishment. A member of the church expressed a desire to "support the Smiths in any way possible". The Supreme Court of Georgia upheld the convictions in 2010, and the Supreme Court of the United States denied the case in 2011.

== Personal life ==
Gwen married David Shamblin in January 1978 and together they had two children and nine grandchildren. In 2018, Shamblin filed for divorce from David. Shamblin became engaged to actor Joe Lara on June 23, 2018. They married in a Remnant Fellowship Church wedding ceremony on August 18, 2018 and she became the step-mother to Lara's daughter from his previous relationship. In 1996, Shamblin bought Ashlawn, a historic mansion that was built in Brentwood, Tennessee in 1838.

== Death and legacy ==
Gwen Shamblin Lara was killed together with her husband Joe, her son-in-law Brandon Hannah, and two other couples from the Remnant Fellowship Church when the Laras' 1982 Cessna Citation 501 private jet crashed into Percy Priest Lake near Smyrna, Tennessee, shortly after takeoff on May 29, 2021. The National Transportation Safety Board concluded that the crash was a result of pilot Joe Lara's "loss of airplane control during climb due to spatial disorientation."

According to her will, Shamblin did not leave any of her money to the church.

=== Television portrayals ===
A five-part docuseries, The Way Down: God, Greed, and the Cult of Gwen Shamblin, was released on Max in 2021.

In 2023, Shamblin was portrayed by Jennifer Grey in the Lifetime TV film Gwen Shamblin: Starving for Salvation, which was directed by John L'Ecuyer.

== Selected works ==
=== Books ===
- The Weigh Down Diet. Doubleday. 1997. ISBN 9780385487627.
- Exodus: Daily Devotional. Weigh Down Workshop. 1998. ISBN 9781892729002.
- Rise Above: God Can Set You Free from Your Weight Problems Forever. Thomas Nelson. 2000. ISBN 9780785268765.
- Out of Egypt: Inspiration for Conquering Life's Strongholds. Thomas Nelson. 2000. ISBN 9780785268499.
- The Legend to the Treasure. Weigh Down Workshop. 2007. ISBN 9781892729804.
- Weigh Down Basics: Workbook. Weigh Down Workshop. 2012. ISBN 9781892729132.
- History of the One True God Workbook: Volume 1: the Origin of Good and Evil. Weigh Down Workshop. 2013. ISBN 9781892729170.
- History of the Love of God: Volume II: A Love More Ancient Than Time. Weigh Down Ministries. 2015. ISBN 9781892729262.

=== Other media ===
- Exodus out of Egypt: weigh down workshop, Weigh Down Workshop, 1992, OCLC 42869110
- Rising above: the magnetic pull of the refrigerator, Weigh Down Workshop, Inc., 1992, OCLC 42414509
- Exodus from strongholds, Weigh Down Workshop, 1998, ISBN 1892729075, OCLC 51290468
