= Joe Lara =

American actor (1962–2021)

- Lara in 1996
- Born: William Joseph Lara; October 2, 1962; San Diego, California, U.S.
- Died: May 29, 2021 (aged 58); Percy Priest Lake, Tennessee, U.S.
- Occupations: Actor, musician
- Years active: 1988–2021 (Note: Lara's acting career was from 1988 until 2002 while his country music career began in 2002 until his death in 2021 with his first album being released in 2011. Lara was also involved in public Remnant Fellowship Church productions beginning in 2019 until his death in 2021.)
- Spouse: Gwen Shamblin (m. 2018; died 2021)
- Partner: Natasha Pavlovich (1984–2015) (Note: They dated on and off between these years and were temporarily at one point engaged.)
- Children: 1

William Joseph Lara (October 2, 1962 – May 29, 2021) was an American actor, martial artist, and musician, known for the role of Tarzan in the American TV series Tarzan: The Epic Adventures.

== Early life and career ==
Lara was born William Joseph Lara on October 2, 1962 in San Diego, California to Diane (née Wesolowski) and William Lara. He was raised in Newport Beach, California.

=== Acting and modeling career ===
In 1981, Lara began his modeling career and traveled to many European countries including Italy, France, and Switzerland. Lara played Tarzan in the 1989 TV movie Tarzan in Manhattan and in the 1996–1997 follow-up TV series Tarzan: The Epic Adventures. He also appeared in numerous action films, including American Cyborg: Steel Warrior alongside actors Nicole Hansen and John Saint Ryan in 1993 and Steel Frontier alongside actors Brion James and Bo Svenson in 1995. Lara starred in the 1999 Menahem Golan action film Lima: Breaking the Silence portraying Victor alongside actor Billy Drago. In 2000, Lara portrayed the role of Detective Miller in Very Mean Men directed by Tony Vitale alongside actors Matthew Modine, Ben Gazzara, and Martin Landau.

=== Musical career ===
He stopped acting after 20 years in 2002 to pursue a career in country music. In 2009, Lara became active in music. Lara released his debut country album entitled "Joe Lara: The Cry of Freedom" on October 20, 2011. Lara released a cover version of the 2007 Michael Buble song "Everything" on August 18, 2019 in honor of him and his wife Gwen's one year wedding anniversary.

=== Remnant Fellowship Church productions ===
On September 9, 2019, Lara and his wife Gwen began a Youtube series entitled Life with Gwen and Joe. The final episode entitled "Honoring the Christian Martyrs" was released on November 20, 2020.

== Personal life ==
Lara met actress Natasha Pavlovich in 1984 and dated on and off for several years until 2015 and were briefly engaged. Together they have one child, a daughter (b. 2010).

Lara became engaged to Christian author and pastor Gwen Shamblin on June 23, 2018. They married on August 18, 2018 in a Remnant Fellowship Church wedding ceremony. Together they lived in Brentwood, Tennessee.

Lara was a certified pilot holding multi-engine commercial and instrument ratings along with a type rating for the Cessna Citation I.

== Death ==
On May 29, 2021, Lara died when a Cessna Citation I business jet registered to JL & GL Productions LP crashed into Percy Priest Lake near Smyrna. His wife, her son-in-law, and four members of Lara's church also died in the crash. The cause of the accident was investigated by the National Transportation Safety Board and concluded that the cause was the result of pilot error. Reports in the immediate aftermath of the accident indicated that Lara's aviation medical certificate had expired in 2019, but Aviation International News and WSMV-TV subsequently found that Lara held a valid medical certificate when the crash occurred. While it was initially unclear who was flying the aircraft when it crashed (also on board was a pilot who lacked the required type rating to fly the Citation), the National Transportation Safety Board's preliminary report stated that "the pilot held a commercial pilot certificate with ratings for airplane single-engine land, multiengine land, and instrument airplane", and "The pilot held a type rating for the airplane with no restrictions. His most recent Federal Aviation Administration (FAA) second-class medical certificate was issued on November 12, 2019, with the limitation that he "must wear corrective lenses". This information along with a CNN article on June 15, 2021, stating, "The pilot, who was among the seven killed, had a commercial pilot certificate and a private pilot certificate and had logged 1,680 total flight hours, 83 of those in the plane involved in the crash" has led some reports to conclude the pilot could only have been Lara.

== Filmography ==
=== Film ===
Year	Title	Role	Notes
1988	Night Wars	American Soldier	
1992	Sunset Heat	Todd	
1993	American Cyborg: Steel Warrior	Austin	
1995	Steel Frontier	Johnny Yuma	Direct-to-video film
1995	Hologram Man	Captain Kurt Decoda	Direct-to-video film
1995	Live Wire 2: Human Timebomb	Price	Direct-to-video film
1995	Final Equinox	Lugar	
1996	Warhead	General Kraft	
1998	Armstrong	"Ponytail"	
1999	Lima: Breaking the Silence	Victor	
1999	Operation Delta Force 4: Deep Fault	McKinney	
2000	Strike Zone	Dunk Stevens	Direct-to-video film
2000	Very Mean Men	Detective Miller	
2000	Doomsdayer	Jack Logan	
2001	Dead Man's Run	Derek	
2001	Death Game	Micky Haiden	
2002	Starfire Mutiny	Sam Talbot	Direct-to-video film
2018	Summer of '67	Soap Opera Actor	

=== Television ===
Year	Title	Role	Notes
1989	Tarzan in Manhattan	Tarzan	Television film
1990	Gunsmoke: The Last Apache	Wolf	Television film
1992	Danger Island	Matt	Television film
1993	Tropical Heat	Devon Madsen	Episode: "Tess"
1993	Baywatch	Frank Randall	Episode: "Tentacles: Part 2"
1996–1997	Tarzan: The Epic Adventures	Tarzan	Lead role
1997	Operation Delta Force	Johan Nash	Television film
1998	Conan the Adventurer	Kamikon	Episode: "The Cavern"
1998	In Search of Tarzan with Jonathan Ross	Himself	Television film
2000	The Magnificent Seven	Pace McCormick	Episode: "Penance"

== Discography ==
=== Albums ===
Title	Album details
Joe Lara: The Cry of Freedom	Released: October 20, 2011; Label: Independent; Formats: Digital download, CD
