= Prim =

Prim may refer to:

== People ==
- Prim (given name)
- Prim (surname)

== Places ==
- Point Prim – Lighthouse on Prince Edward Island, Canada.
- Prim, Arkansas – An unincorporated community in Cleburne County, Arkansas, United States
- Prim, Virginia, unincorporated community in King George County
- Dolní Přím, a municipality and village in the Czech Republic
- Přím, a village and part of Javornice in the Czech Republic
- Saint-Prim, commune in Isère, France
- Prim (Neckar), river in Baden-Württemberg, Germany, tributary of the Neckar
- Prims, river in Rhineland-Palatinate, Germany, tributary of the Saar

== Other ==
- Heart of Moldova Party known as PRIM
- Party of the People of Free Indonesia known as PRIM
- Prim, a type of tamburica (musical instrument)
- Prim or Primost, a Norwegian cheese
- Prim, abbreviation for Primitive Methodist
- Prim's algorithm for minimum spanning tree, developed by Robert C. Prim
- PRIM (watches), a Czech trademark
- Graham Street Prims F.C., football club in Derby, England
- In computers, a geometric primitive, or prim, is a simple shape used in 3D modeling to build into more complex objects.
  - A Sculpted prim, in Second Life, is a 3D parametric object whose 3D shape is determined by a texture, more advanced than the game's geometric primitives
- Presence and Instant Messaging or PRIM, a proposed standard protocol for instant messaging
- Prim, inferred to as the "darkness behind everything" in Stephen King's novels
- Prim Everdeen, a character in the Hunger Games trilogy
