= 2024 Lumut mid-air collision =

Crash of two Royal Malaysian Navy helicopters

Accident
- Date: 23 April 2024
- Summary: Mid-air collision due to pilot error on the Fennec
- Site: RMN Lumut Naval Base, Lumut, Perak, Malaysia; 4.221581°N 100.604864°E
- Total fatalities: 10
- Total survivors: 0

First aircraft
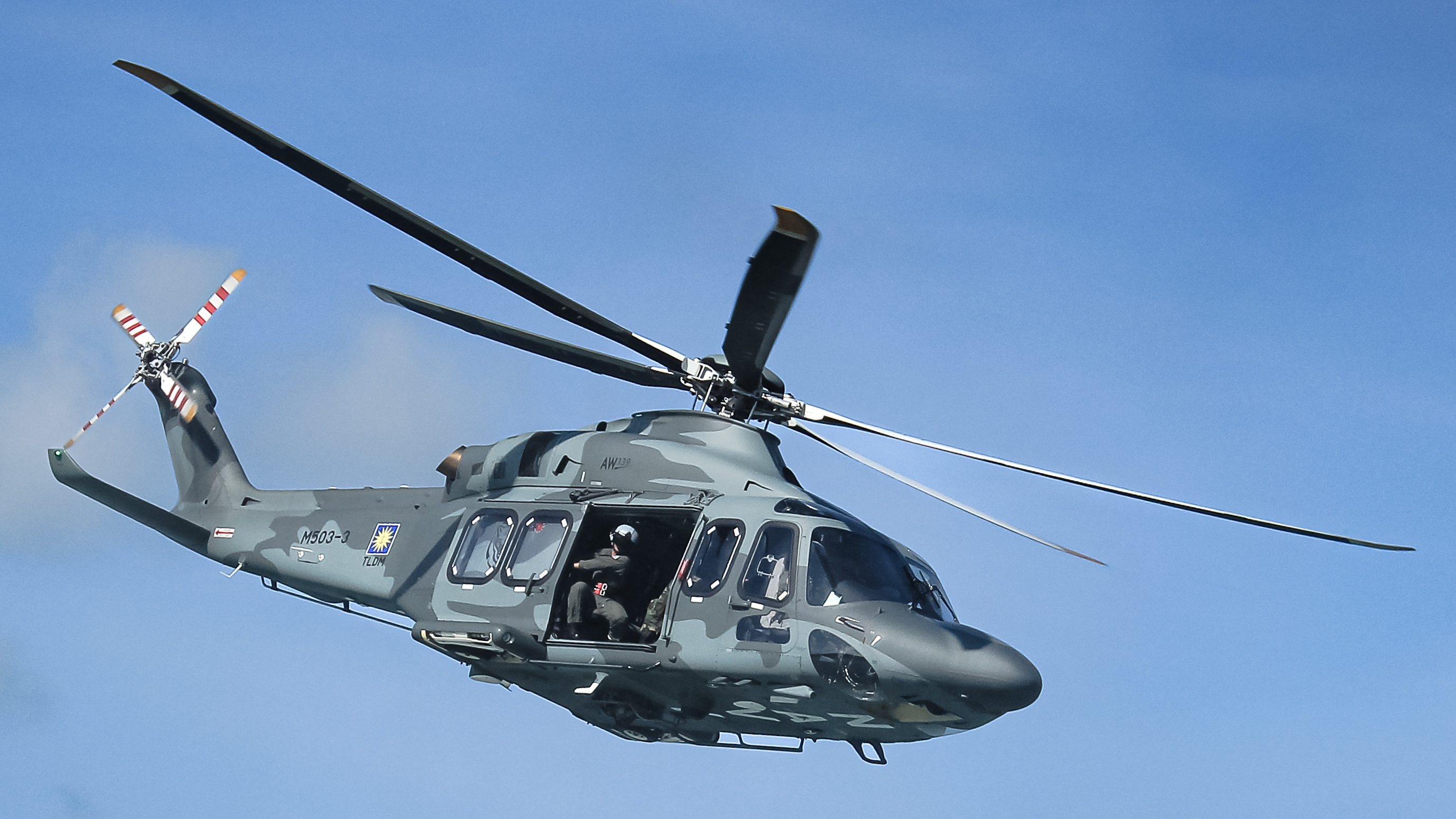
- M503-3, the AW139 involved in the collision.
- Type: AgustaWestland AW139
- Registration: M503-3
- Flight origin: Sitiawan Airport
- Destination: RMN Lumut Naval Base
- Occupants: 7
- Crew: 7
- Fatalities: 7
- Survivors: 0

Second aircraft
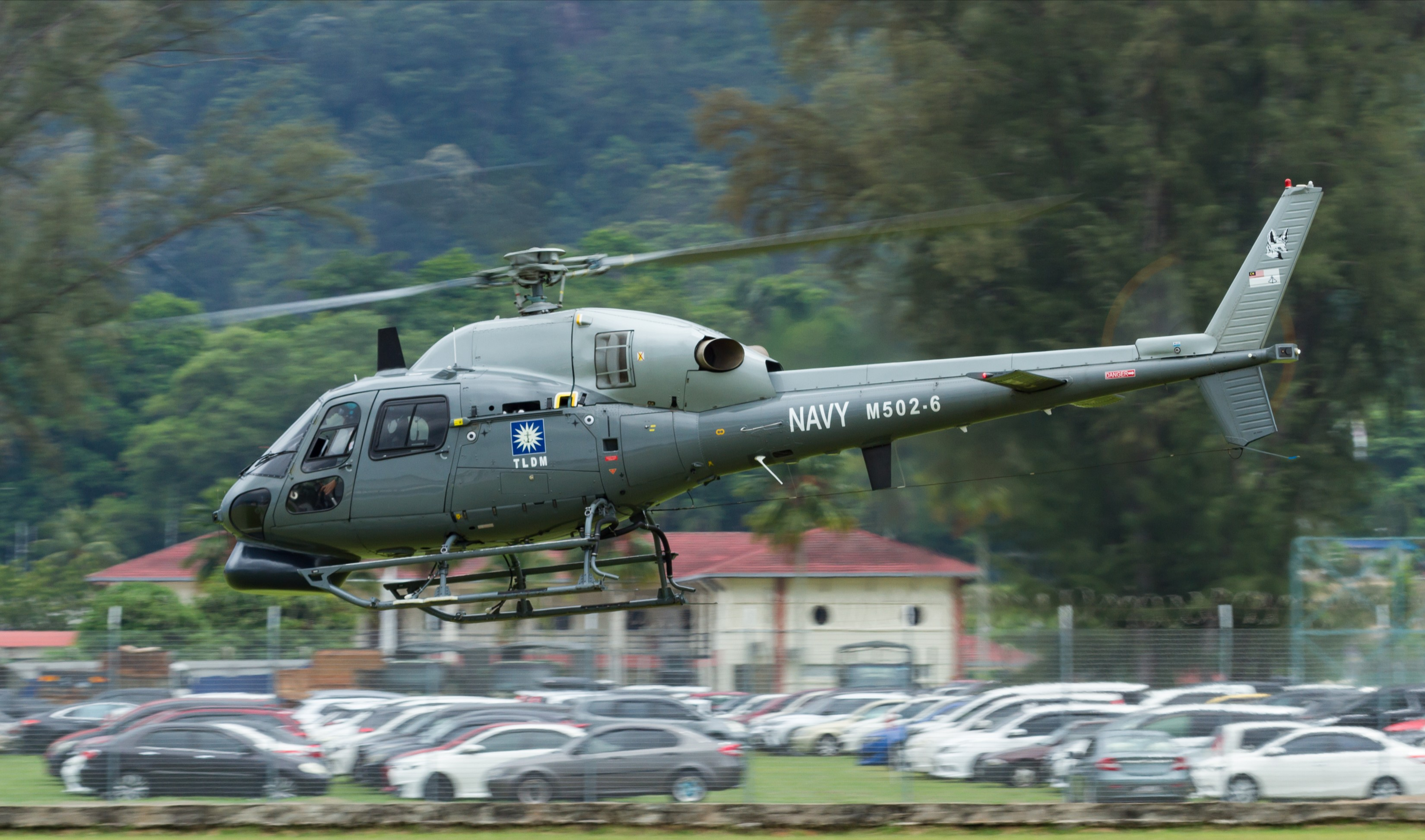
- M502-6, the Eurocopter Fennec involved in the collision
- Type: Eurocopter Fennec
- Registration: M502-6
- Flight origin: Sitiawan Airport
- Destination: RMN Lumut Naval Base
- Occupants: 3
- Crew: 3
- Fatalities: 3
- Survivors: 0

On 23 April 2024 at 09:32 MYT, two Royal Malaysian Navy helicopters – an AgustaWestland AW139 and a Eurocopter Fennec – collided over the Malaysian town of Lumut during a military parade rehearsal celebrating the 90th anniversary of the Royal Malaysian Navy. Ten people – seven on the AW139 and three on the Fennec – were killed. There were no survivors. Malaysian investigators determined the crash was caused by pilot error.

== Background ==
Lumut, a town in the western Malaysian state of Perak, is the headquarters of the Royal Malaysian Navy.

== Collision ==
The collision occurred during a military parade rehearsal to commemorate the upcoming 90th anniversary of the Navy. Based on normal parade procedures, aircraft will perform a tactical fly past at the same time ground parade units perform "general salute, present arms!". During the demonstration, one helicopter clipped the other's rotor, causing both to lose control and crashed within the grounds of the Lumut Naval Base. The AW139 crashed near the stairs of the Naval Base Stadium while the Fennec crashed near a swimming pool. Both aircraft suffered total hull loss upon impact.

=== Cause ===
Malaysian investigators determined the crash was caused by pilot error.

== Crew and passengers ==
The Agusta Westland AW139, also known as M503-3, had four crew and three passengers.

1. Commander Muhammad Firdaus bin Ramli RMN - CO of 503 Squadron
2. Lieutenant Commander Wan Rezaudeen Kamal bin Wan Zainal Abidin RMN
3. Lieutenant Commander Mohammad Amirulfaris bin Mohamad Marzukhi RMN
4. Warrant Officer II (AQM) Muhammad Faisol bin Tamadun
5. Warrant Officer II TNL Noorfarahimi binti Mohd Saedy (Passenger)
6. Petty Officer TNL Noor Rahiza binti Anuar (Passenger)
7. Able Rate JJM Joanna Felicia anak Rohna (Passenger)

The Eurocopter Fennec, also known as M502-6, had three crew.

1. Commander Muhamad Amir bin Mohamad RMN - CO of 502 Squadron
2. Lieutenant Sivasutan a/l Thanjappan RMN
3. Warrant Officer II TMK Mohd Shahrizan bin Mohd Termizi

== Aftermath ==
Prime Minister Anwar Ibrahim called the crash a loss for the nation and offered condolences to the families of the victims. He also said both the Royal Malaysian Navy and the Ministry of Defence would carry out a probe into it. Defence Minister Mohamed Khaled Nordin said that the bodies of those killed would be brought to a hospital in Ipoh before being buried in accordance with their families' wishes. He mentioned that authorities would cover the funeral costs and explore providing compensation and benefits to the families of the victims.

In June 2026, footage of the crash uploaded by CNA was widely shared on social media. Viral posts on platforms including TikTok, Facebook and X falsely labeled the video as footage of the 2026 Rio de Janeiro mid-air collision that killed American musician Oliver Tree, Argentinian YouTuber Gaspi, Argentinian director and screenwriter Lucas A. Vignale, Brazilian DJ Lucas Frota and two others.

== See also ==
- List of accidents and incidents involving helicopters
- List of accidents and incidents involving military aircraft (2020–present)
