= The River Train =

2026 Argentine film

- Theatrical release poster
- Spanish: El Tren Fluvial
- Directed by: Lorenzo Ferro; Lucas A. Vignale
- Written by: Lorenzo Ferro; Lucas A. Vignale
- Produced by: Tomás Grandio; Valentine Torre; Casiana Vera
- Starring: Milo Barria; Rita Pauls; Mariano Barria; Lucrecia Pazos; Mailén Barria; Fabián Casas
- Cinematography: Thomas Gringberg
- Edited by: Andres Medina; Lucas A. Vignale
- Production companies: Cinco Rayos; Primo (co-production)
- Release dates: 16 February 2026 (Berlinale); 13 April 2026 (New Directors/New Films Festival)
- Running time: 75 minutes
- Country: Argentina
- Language: Spanish

The River Train (Spanish: El tren fluvial ) is a 2026 Argentine coming-of-age drama film directed by Lorenzo Ferro and Lucas A. Vignale. The film stars Milo Barría, alongside Rita Pauls, Mariano Barría, Fabián Casas, and Lucrecia Pazos. It follows a nine-year-old boy living in a rural Argentine village who dreams of escaping to the city of Buenos Aires by train.

The film had its world premiere at the 76th Berlin International Film Festival on 16 February 2026, where it screened in the Perspectives section, a program dedicated to debut feature films. It was produced by Tomás Grandio, Valentine Torre, and Casiana Vera for the Argentine production company Cinco Rayos. The film was later screened in the United States at New Directors/New Films Festival on 13 April 2026. Theatrically, The River Train was released on 8 October 2026 in Argentina.

This would turn out to be Vignale's only feature film, as he died in a helicopter collision in Rio de Janeiro, Brazil on 14 June 2026.

== Premise ==
In an isolated riverside village in Argentina, nine-year-old malambo prodigy Milo secretly boards a train to Buenos Aires to escape his father’s strict expectations. During the journey, he encounters unfamiliar people and places that challenge his understanding of family, tradition, and the world beyond his rural upbringing.

== Cast ==
- Milo Barría as Milo
- Mariano Barria as Mariano
- Rita Pauls as Profesora
- Lucrecia Pazos as Lucrecia
- Fabián Casas

Credits adapted from ScreenAnarchy.

== Production ==
The River Train was written and directed by Argentine filmmakers Lorenzo Ferro and Lucas A. Vignale in their feature film directorial debuts. The film was produced by Cinco Rayos, and co‑produced by Primo Content. Principal photography was held in Argentina, including in Buenos Aires, Tandil, and along the General Guido‑Divisadero de Pinamar railway line.

== Release ==
The film had its world premiere at the 76th Berlin International Film Festival on 16 February 2026, as part of the Perspectives section, which highlights debut and emerging filmmakers. It later made its North American debut at the New Directors/New Films Festival on 13 April 2026. An Argentine theatrical release was made on 8 October 2026.

The film will be screened for Japanese Premiere on 26 October 2026 in the Youth section of the 39th Tokyo International Film Festival.

== Reception ==
As of March 2026, the review aggregator Rotten Tomatoes lists five critic reviews for the film, all of which are positive. Nadia Dalimonte described the film as "an incredibly singular feature film debut" and "a quietly adventurous portrait of boyhood".
