= Só os Loucos Sabem =

2009 song by Charlie Brown Jr.

Single by Charlie Brown Jr.

from the album Camisa 10 Joga Bola Até na Chuva
- Released: March 2010
- Genre: Brazilian rock, pop rock
- Length: 3:30
- Label: Sony Music
- Composers: Chorão, Thiago Castanho
- Producer: Rick Bonadio

Charlie Brown Jr. singles chronology
"Me Encontra" (2009)	"Só os Loucos Sabem" (2010)	"Céu Azul" (2011)

Music video
- "Só os Loucos Sabem" on YouTube

Só os Loucos Sabem (Portuguese for "Only the Nuts Know") is a song by the Brazilian rock band Charlie Brown Jr., it was original released in March 2010 as the second single of the 2009 album Camisa 10 Joga Bola Até na Chuva

== Writing ==
Só os Loucos Sabem was written by the vocalist Chorão in a collaboration by its roommate, the guitarist Thiago Castanho, the song was inspired to an experience that Chorão had in the day of recording of an DVD on Igreja Bola de Neve and the live CD of Rodolfo Abrantes (that this time was recorded in Citibank Hall)

== Music video ==
The Music Video of Só os Loucos Sabem was released on 7 March 2010 with the Direction of Alex Miranda (who also directed the music video of Champanhe and Água-Benta in 2004), according to Vevo, this video become the tenth most watched video in Brazil in 2013

== ITunes Brazil ==
After the death of Chorão, Só os Loucos Sabem was ranked number two between the most fast selling songs of the week in ITunes Brazil

== Covers ==
- in 2018, the rapper Projota recorded this track as a single on the álbum AMADMOL ao Vivo.
- in 2020, Família Lima recorded this track on the álbum Música de Domingo II, this time with the special participation of the singer Agnes Nunes.

== Accolades ==
Awards and nominations for "Só os Loucos Sabem"
Organization	Year	Category	Result	Ref.
Prêmio Multishow de Música Brasileira	2011	Melhor Videoclipe	Nominated	

== Certifications ==
Certifications for "Só os Loucos Sabem"
Region	Certification	Certified units/sales
Brazil (Pro-Música Brasil)	Diamond	500,000^{‡}
^{‡} Sales+streaming figures based on certification alone.
