= Lucas Frota =

Brazilian DJ and record producer (1998–2026)

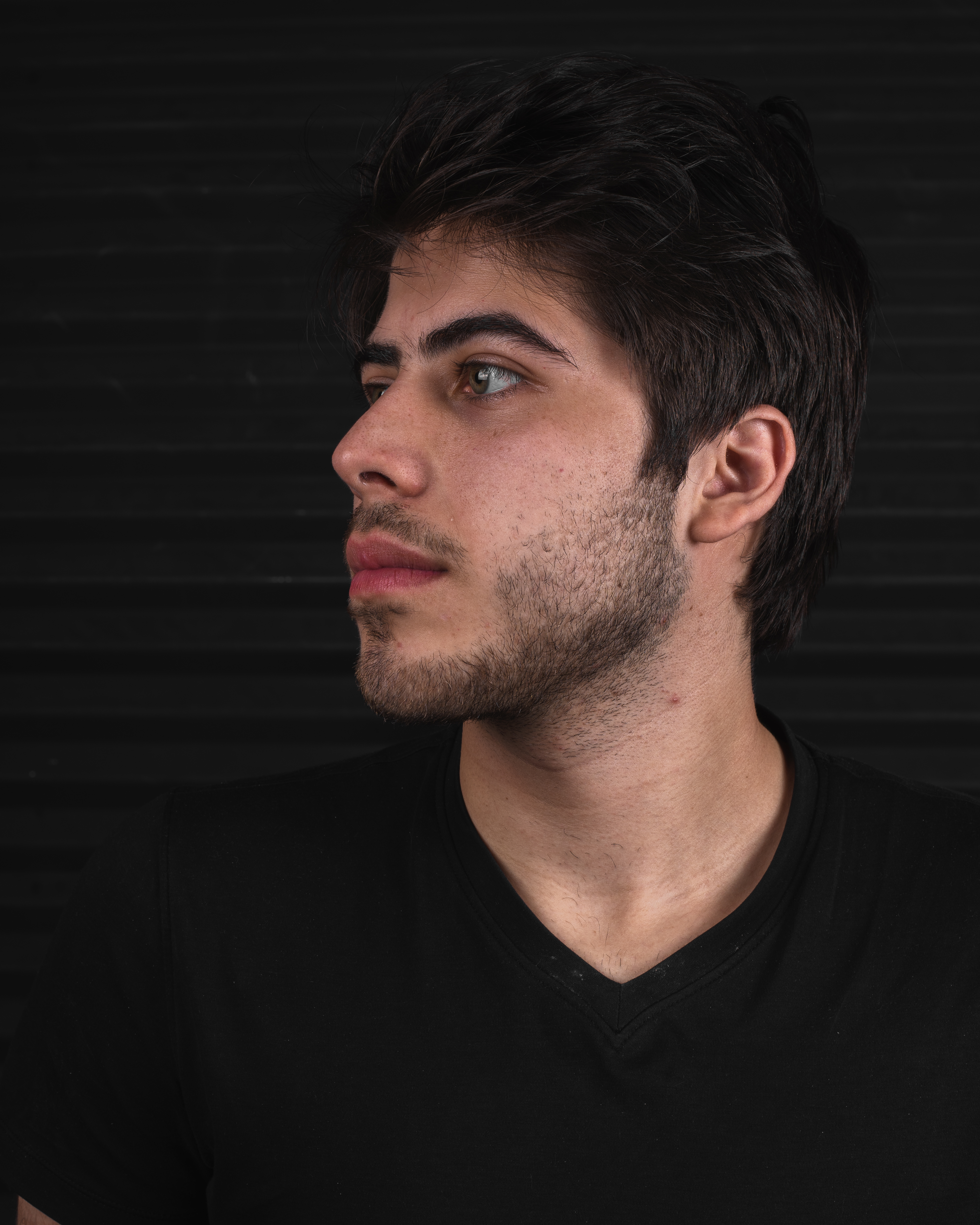
- Frota in 2020
- Born: Lucas Brito Chaves; 16 August 1998; Rio de Janeiro, Brazil
- Died: 14 June 2026 (aged 27); Rio de Janeiro, Brazil
- Occupations: Record producer; musician; DJ
- Years active: 2012–2026

Lucas Brito Chaves (16 August 1998 – 14 June 2026), known professionally as Lucas Frota, was a Brazilian record producer, musician, and DJ.

Frota was killed in the 2026 Rio de Janeiro mid-air collision on 14 June 2026 along with five others.

== Career ==
Lucas Brito Chaves was born in Rio de Janeiro in 1998. He began making music as a teenager, initially under the moniker DJ Lukke. From 2018, Frota built his career in the United States, living between Miami and Los Angeles and working with electronic music. His music included deep house and funk carioca, a mix which Frota himself styled as "Baile Tech". He performed at clubs and festivals, such as Burning Man, and was a resident DJ with the Around The Corner collective in Miami. In March 2025, Frota recorded a 55-minute DJ set at Christ the Redeemer.

Frota also worked with other rappers and musicians such as Snoop Dogg and Lizzo as well as collaborating with other producers like Roger Sanchez, Armand Van Helden, and Josh Wink.

== Death ==
CCTV footage of the helicopter falling that crashed into the helicopter Frota was in.

On 14 June 2026, Frota died in a helicopter crash after a mid-air collision involving two helicopters at a BYD car dealership in Rio de Janeiro; everyone, including Frota, died instantly upon impact. Police identified Frota as one of the five passengers of the first helicopter along with American singer Oliver Tree, Argentine YouTuber Gaspi, and Argentine director Lucas A. Vignale.

A public ceremony was held for Frota at Cemitério Memorial do Carmo on 15 June; he was cremated on the same day. Around The Corner issued an official statement on his death, paying tribute to his career.

== Discography ==
=== Singles (as producer) ===
Year	Song	Artist	Album	Ref
2021	"All Night Long"	Agnes Nunes	Non-album singles	
2022	"Baile Tech"	Xamã	Non-album singles	
2024	"Hillside (Fine, Fine)	Ramonis Campelo	Non-album singles	
2026	"Fire"	Sacha Robotti and Conejo	I, Robotti	
