= Recreio dos Bandeirantes =

- Neighborhood
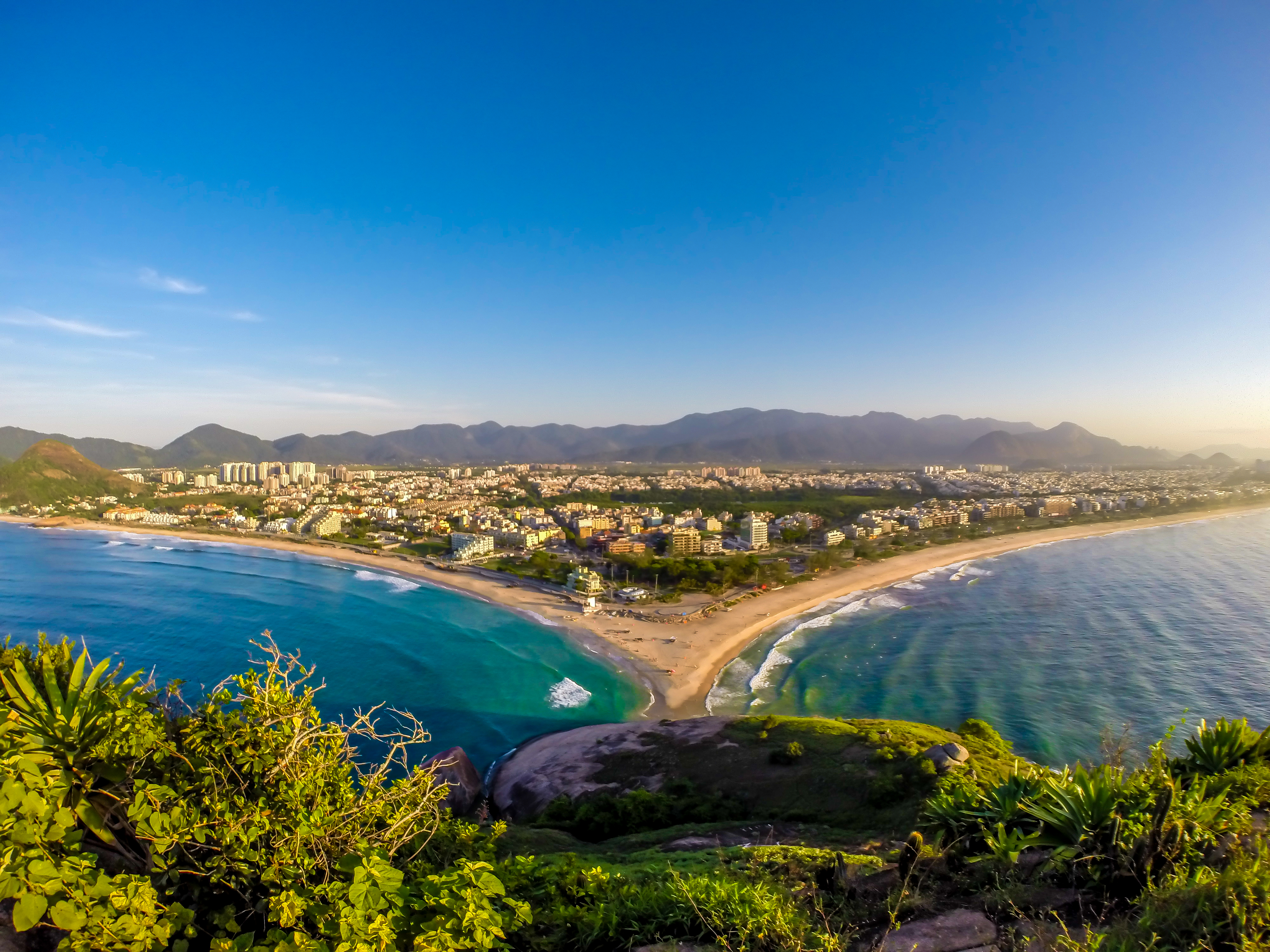

- Location in Brazil
- Coordinates: 23°00′59″S 43°28′45″W
- Country: Brazil
- State: Rio de Janeiro
- Municipality/City: Rio de Janeiro
- Zone: Southwest Zone

Area
  - Total: 30.65 km^{2} (11.83 sq mi)

Population (2022)
  - Total: 140,437
  - Density: 4,582/km^{2} (11,870/sq mi)

Recreio dos Bandeirantes (or simply Recreio, Brazilian Portuguese pronunciation: [ʁeˈkɾeju duz bɐ̃dejˈɾɐ̃tʃis]) is both the name of a beach and neighborhood in the Southwest Zone of Rio de Janeiro, Brazil. It is a recent development, with no skyscrapers, and the area also contains jungles atop rocky cliffs and hills. High waves permit surfing at Recreio Beach and the white sand beach is used by beach volleyball players. It is about 35 km from the Rio de Janeiro city centre, and most of the people living there are middle-class and high middle-class families, who moved in trying to escape the growing violence of both the North and South Zones.

== History ==
Apocryphally, the neighborhood received the name Recreio dos Bandeirantes, or "Bandeirantes' Leisure" because the company that mapped and hired a real estate agent to sell lots there had that name. Another version says that many of the newcomers were from São Paulo, the city from which the Bandeiras departed in colonial times, and therefore Paulistas are associated with them. Still another version states that Recreio was the first (or last) resting place with fresh water for Bandeirantes traveling between Rio de Janeiro and São Paulo.

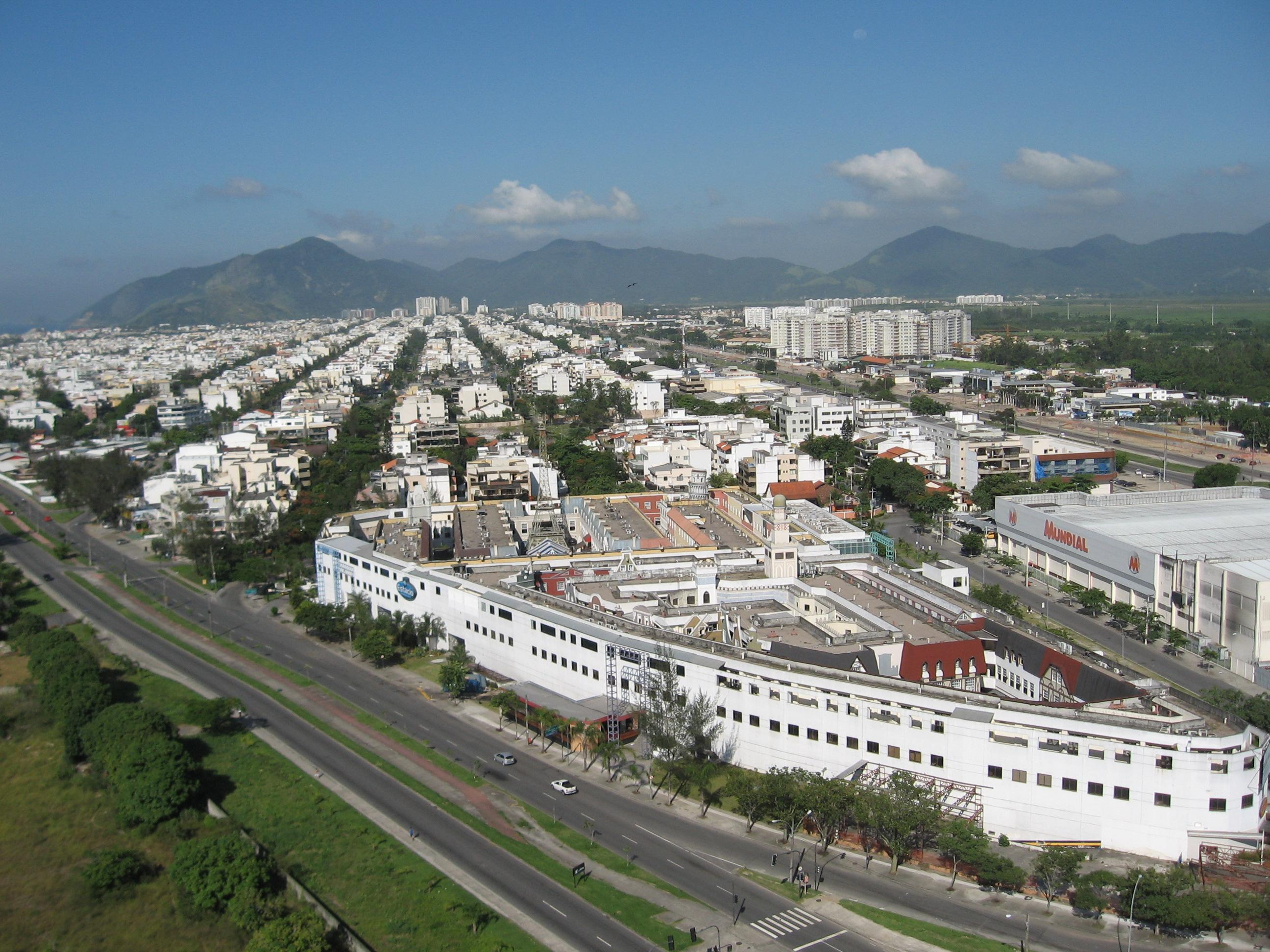
Recreio dos Bandeirantes: View from the beginning of the neighborhood, seen from Barra World Shopping

Development in the area began in 1959, and only more recently, have well-to-do residents discovered and made Recreio their home. Despite a high population density, the neighborhood is mostly residential and does not have the busy nightlife of more central neighborhoods like Lapa, Copacabana, Leblon, and Ipanema, but there has been an increase in the number of restaurants, pizzerias, bars, private schools and colleges. There are a few favelas, or slums, in the section. Recreio has an organized association of residents who communicate online with tips and news about the neighborhood. They have been able to address the need for the city building a ciclovia—a road for bicycles—and authorities have been persuaded to build, in the future, two subway stations in the section to facilitate commuting to downtown and the South Side (which would otherwise take about 1.5 h).

=== Recent history ===
In the 1920s, the American Joseph Wesley Finch, born in California in 1884, acquired a group of lands from Banco do Crédito Móvel that would later form what is now known as Gleba B of Recreio. He then began developing the area for the sale of land lots.

On 14 June 2026, two helicopters collided in mid-air over a former church in Recreio, with one aircraft's wreckage crashing in the parking lot of a local car dealership. Six people were killed in the collision, including American musician Oliver Tree, Argentine YouTube personality Gaspi, and Argentine filmmaker Lucas A. Vignale. The helicopter landed in an electrical car service, and caused a huge fire.

== Geography ==
=== Praia do Secreto ===
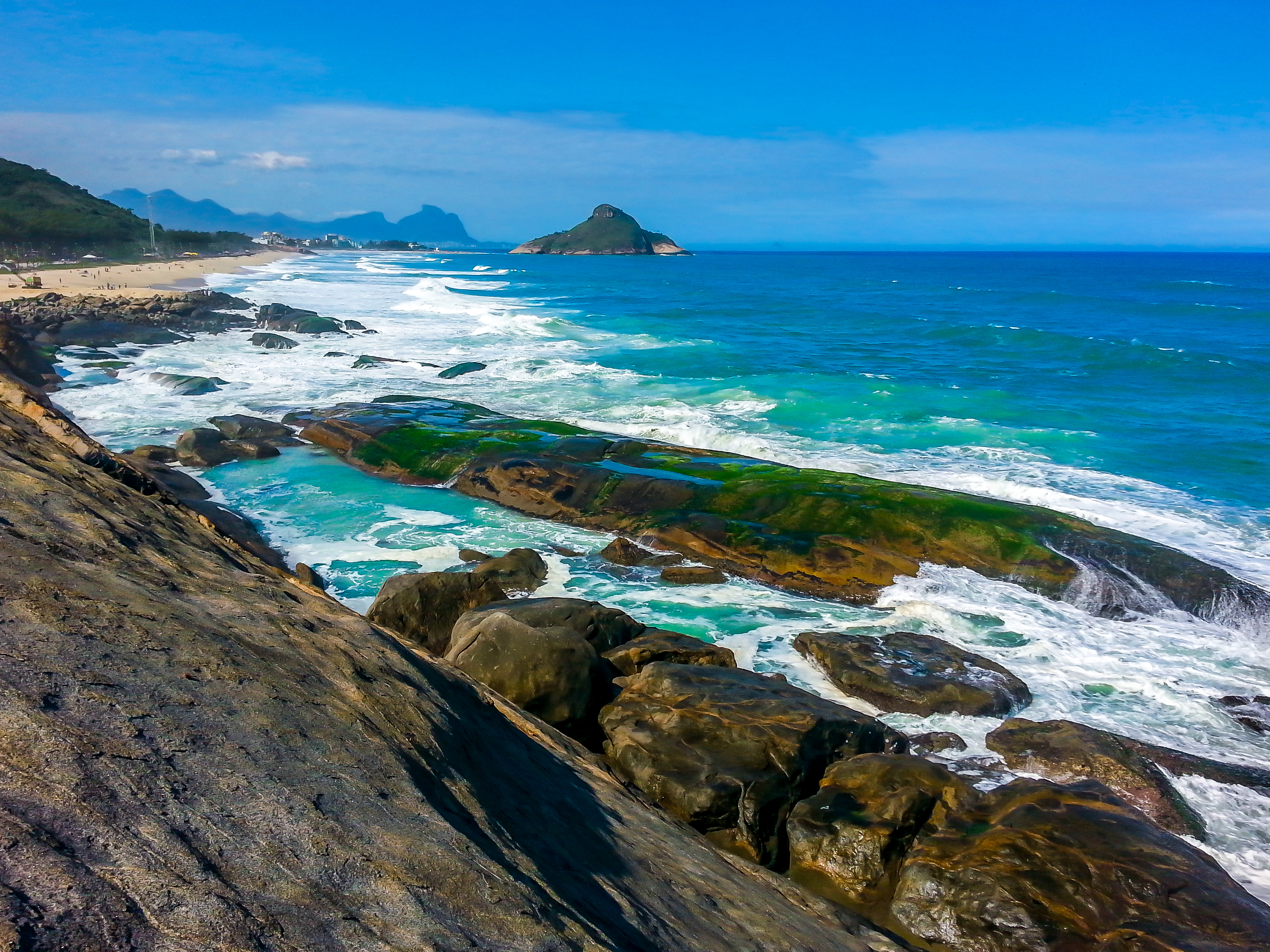
Praia do Secreto.

Praia do Secreto is a beach in the region that features a natural pool formed by rocks and filled by seawater. It is located on the right side of Praia da Macumba, near the ascent to Prainha. It is a famous bodyboarding spot and is known for its “right triangle” (waves that break from right to left forming a triangular shape). The best conditions occur when the swell comes from the south and the wind blows offshore (from land toward the sea).

=== Praia do Recreio ===
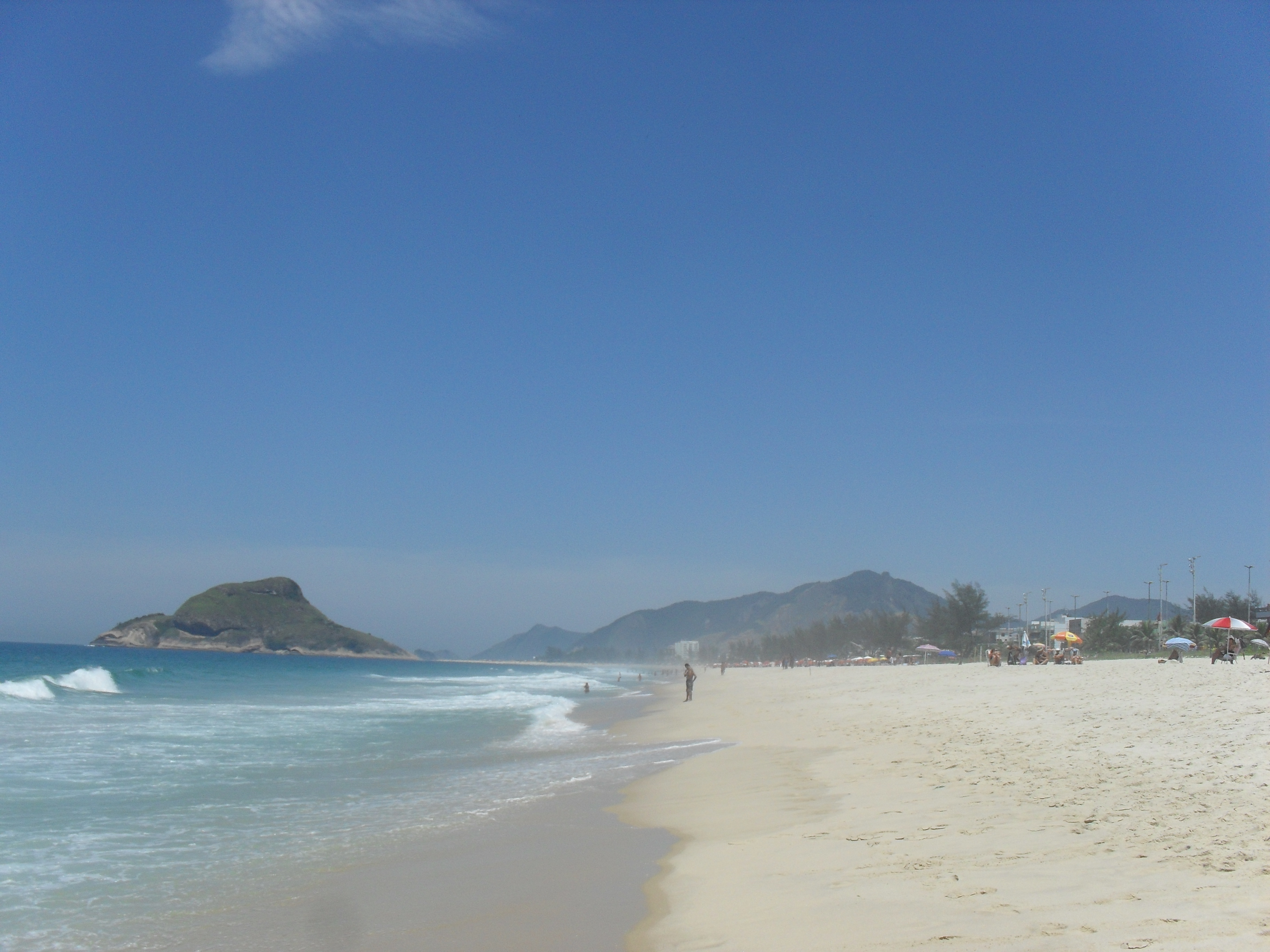
Praia do Recreio.

=== Praia do Pontal ===
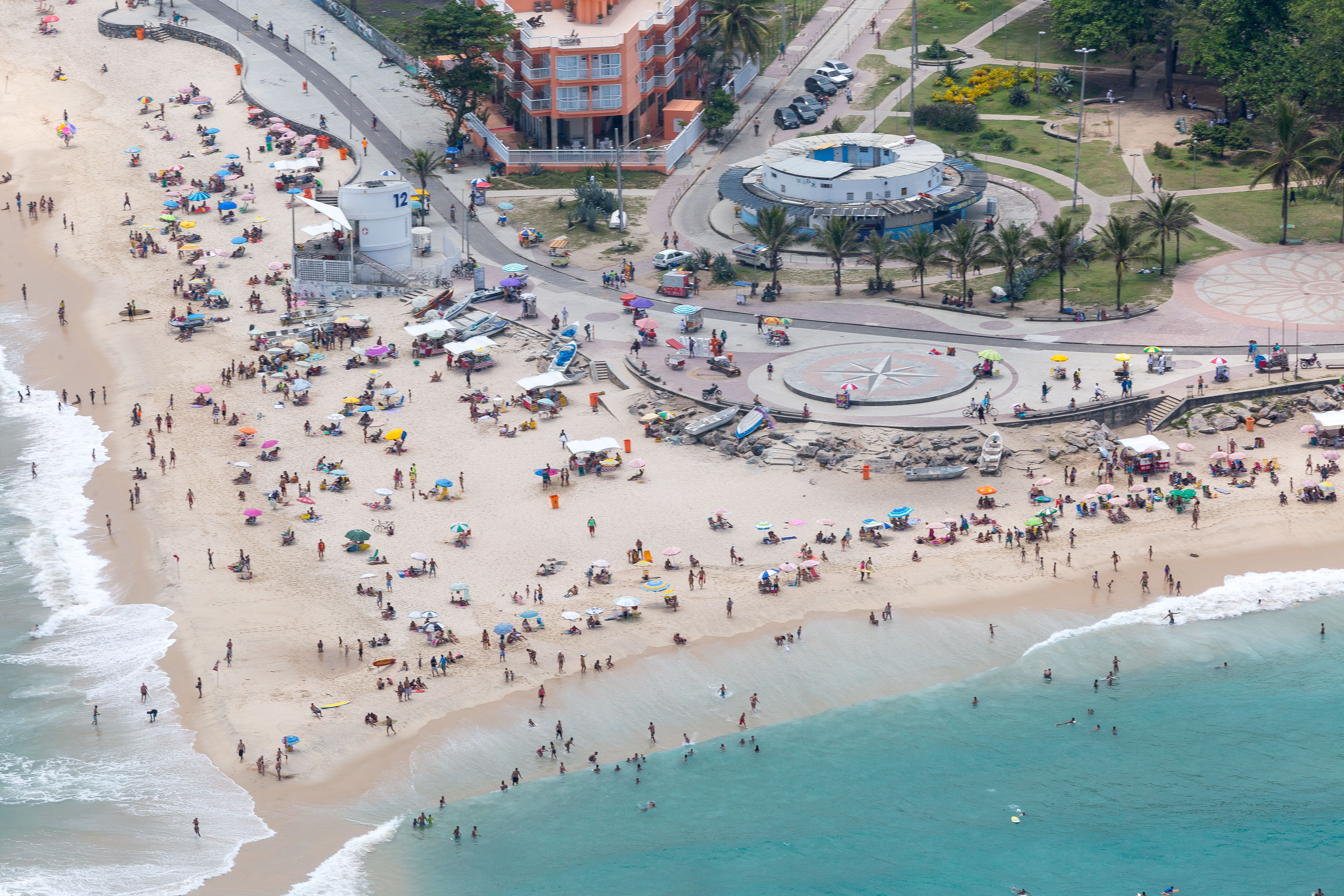
Praia do Pontal.

It is the second largest and most important beach in the area, characterized by the absence of separation between the promenade and the buildings, which are taller here. It stretches from Pedra do Pontal to Pedra de Itapuã.

=== Praia da Macumba ===
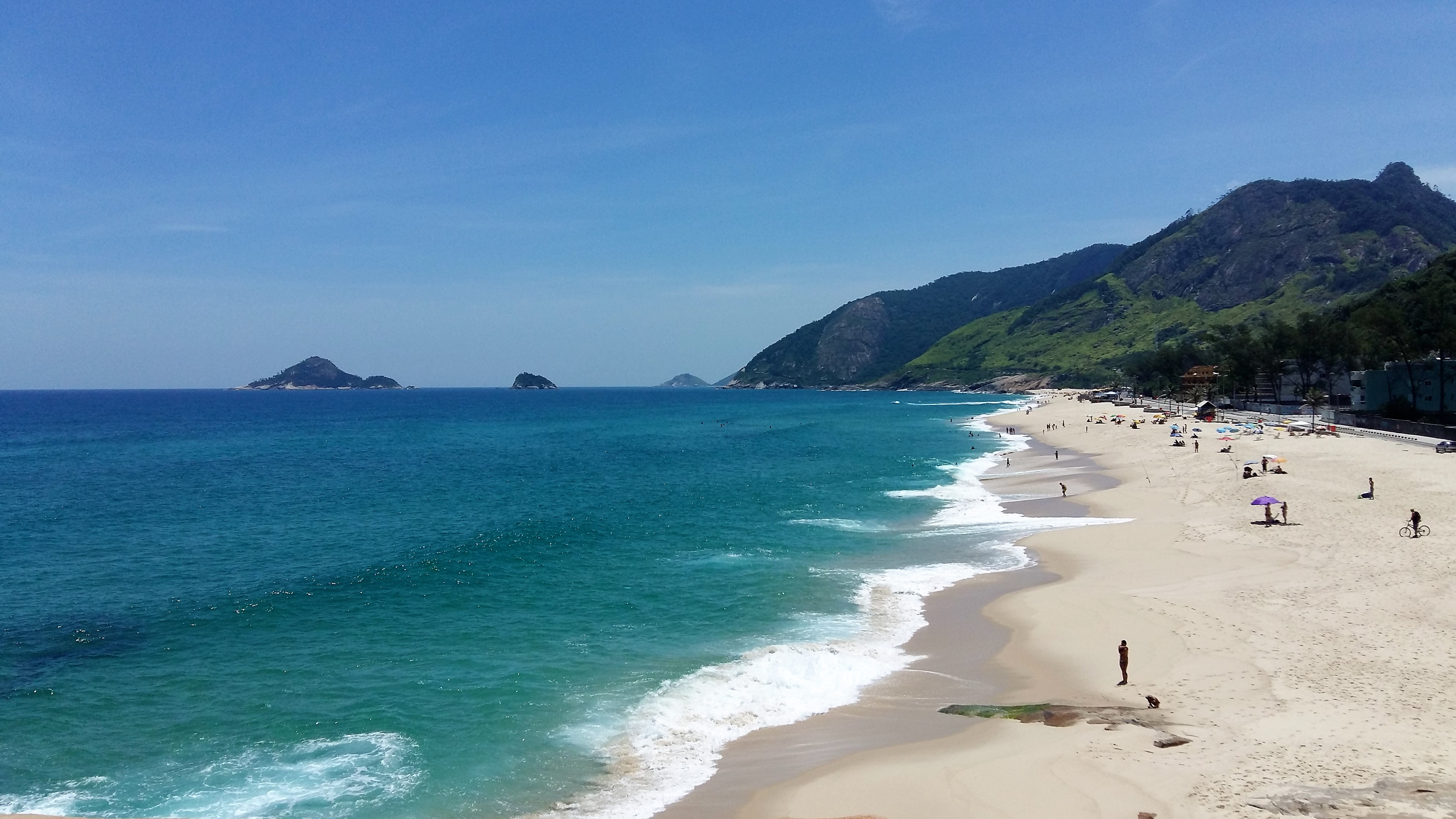
Praia da Macumba seen from Pedra de Itapuã.

Praia da Macumba is about 1.3 kilometres (0.81 mi) long and lies between Prainha and Praia do Pontal. Bordered by the Canal de Sernambetiba—better known as Canal or Rio Morto—and Pedra de Itapuã, it runs along Avenida AW and part of Estrada do Pontal. The beach received its name because it was traditionally a place where followers of Umbanda and Candomblé performed religious offerings and rituals. It is also known as a paradise for surfers who use longboards due to its waves, which provide surfing conditions throughout the year.

It became nationally known in the late 1980s as the main outdoor setting of the telenovela Top Model.

==== Collapse of the promenade ====
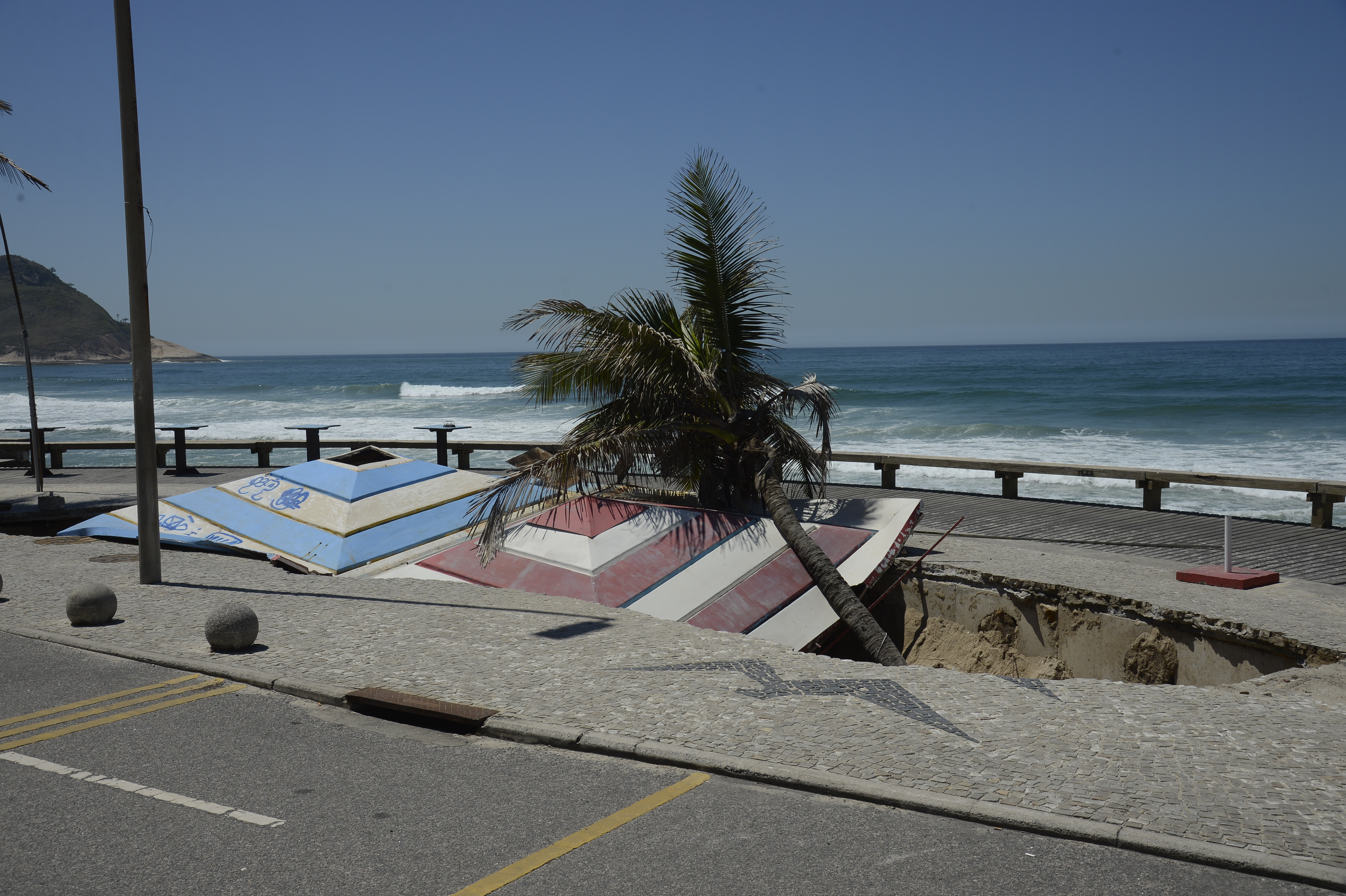
Damage caused by collapses along the beach promenade.

On 15 September 2017, part of the Praia da Macumba promenade sank and collapsed, even though there was no storm surge at sea. According to a local resident, similar problems had occurred in previous years.

On 4 and 9 October further collapses occurred, this time due to strong waves. According to the Municipal Secretary of Conservation and Environment, Rubens Teixeira, the seaside promenade, built more than 15 years earlier, had been poorly constructed.

On 18 October, the Municipal Secretariat of Conservation and Environment (SECONSERMA) began containment work along the promenade. Budgeted at R$14.5 million, the project would be carried out by the company Geomecânica. Synthetic riprap (bags filled with concrete) would be placed in front of and behind the promenade wall to rebuild the soil and pavement and protect nearby buildings. The plan also included filling the affected area and rebuilding the entire promenade. The intervention was scheduled to be carried out in stages and expected to be completed within 120 days.

On 24 October, part of the containment wall installed by the city government, a streetlight pole and a remaining section of sidewalk collapsed under the force of the waves.

Due to the situation, the Federal Public Prosecutor's Office requested that the Federal Court convene a hearing to present a solution to the collapses occurring at the beach.

Currently, the Rio city government is seeking to implement a project proposed by COPPE 17 years earlier, consisting of the installation of a breakwater to prevent the displacement of sand caused by winds and tides.

=== Prainha (Little Beach) ===
Prainha is located between Recreio dos Bandeirantes and Grumari. It has a narrow strip of sand between the Pedra Branca massif and the Atlantic Ocean. It is one of the most popular beaches for surfing. Adjacent to the Grumari neighborhood, it is bordered by Avenida Estado da Guanabara, which is the only access road to the beach, running along its entire length. The area is part of the Prainha Environmental Protection Area (APA), a permanently protected forest area where the construction of any construction is prohibited, apart from the existing structures that serve to maintain the area and provide services to visitors, especially surfers. Surfing, bodyboarding, longboarding, and bodysurfing are the most popular sports in the area.

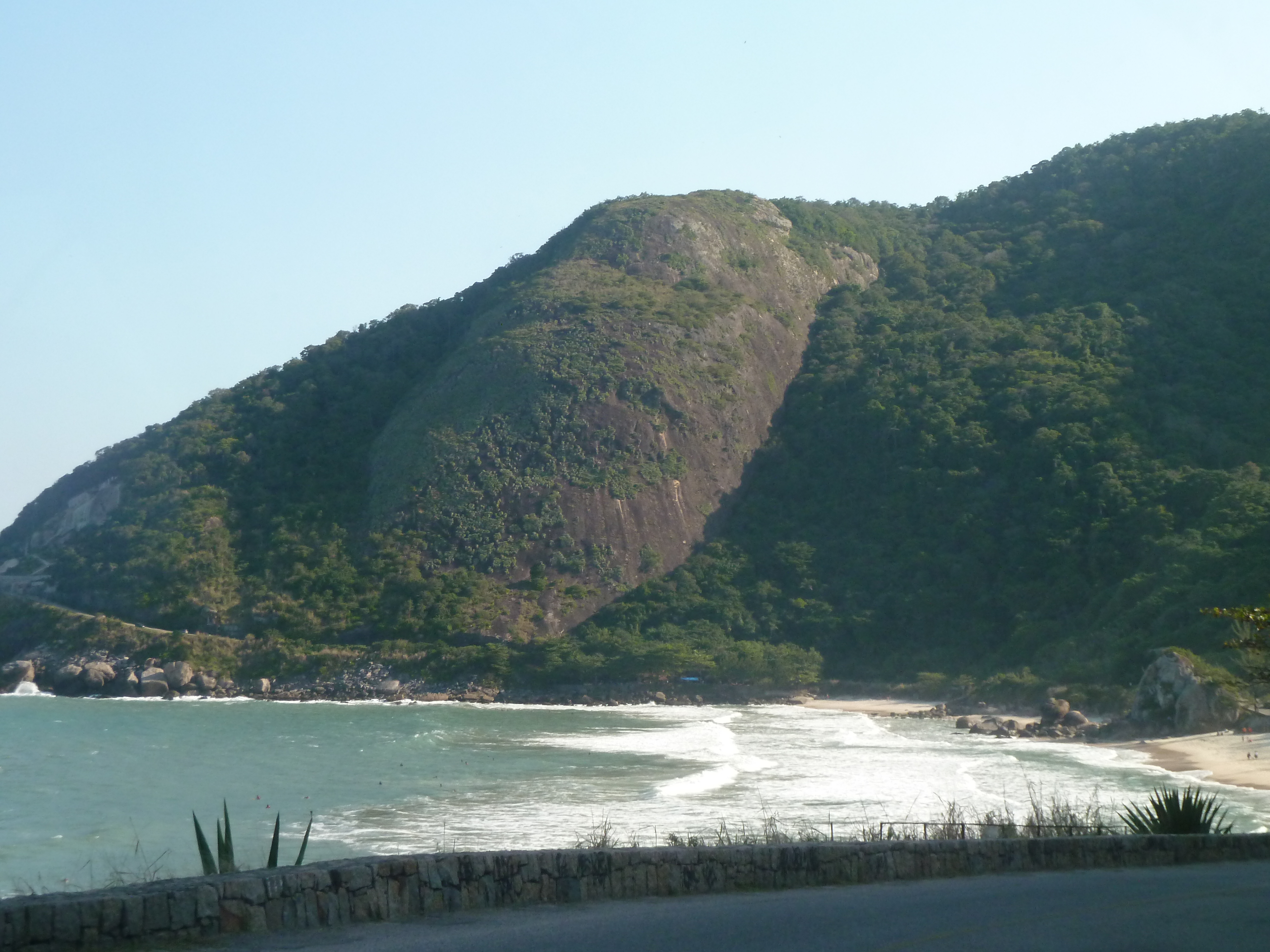
View of Prainha.

The trail to the Caeté viewpoint is located inside the Parque Natural Municipal da Prainha. The park lies directly in front of the beach and is used by many surfers and bathers, as it provides bathrooms, showers and drinking fountains. Because the trail is inside the park, it can only be accessed from 8 a.m. to 5 p.m., the park’s opening hours. After entering the park, visitors will notice signs pointing toward the trail. The path is a circular trail within the park that leads to the beginning of the Caeté viewpoint trail. After a short walk, a sign indicates the correct direction for the Caeté viewpoint trail. From this point the trail becomes steeper and slightly more demanding. Continuing uphill, visitors soon reach the Caeté viewpoint, which offers a panoramic view of Praia do Secreto, Praia da Macumba, Pedra do Pontal, Recreio, Barra da Tijuca and Pedra da Gávea.

== Gallery ==
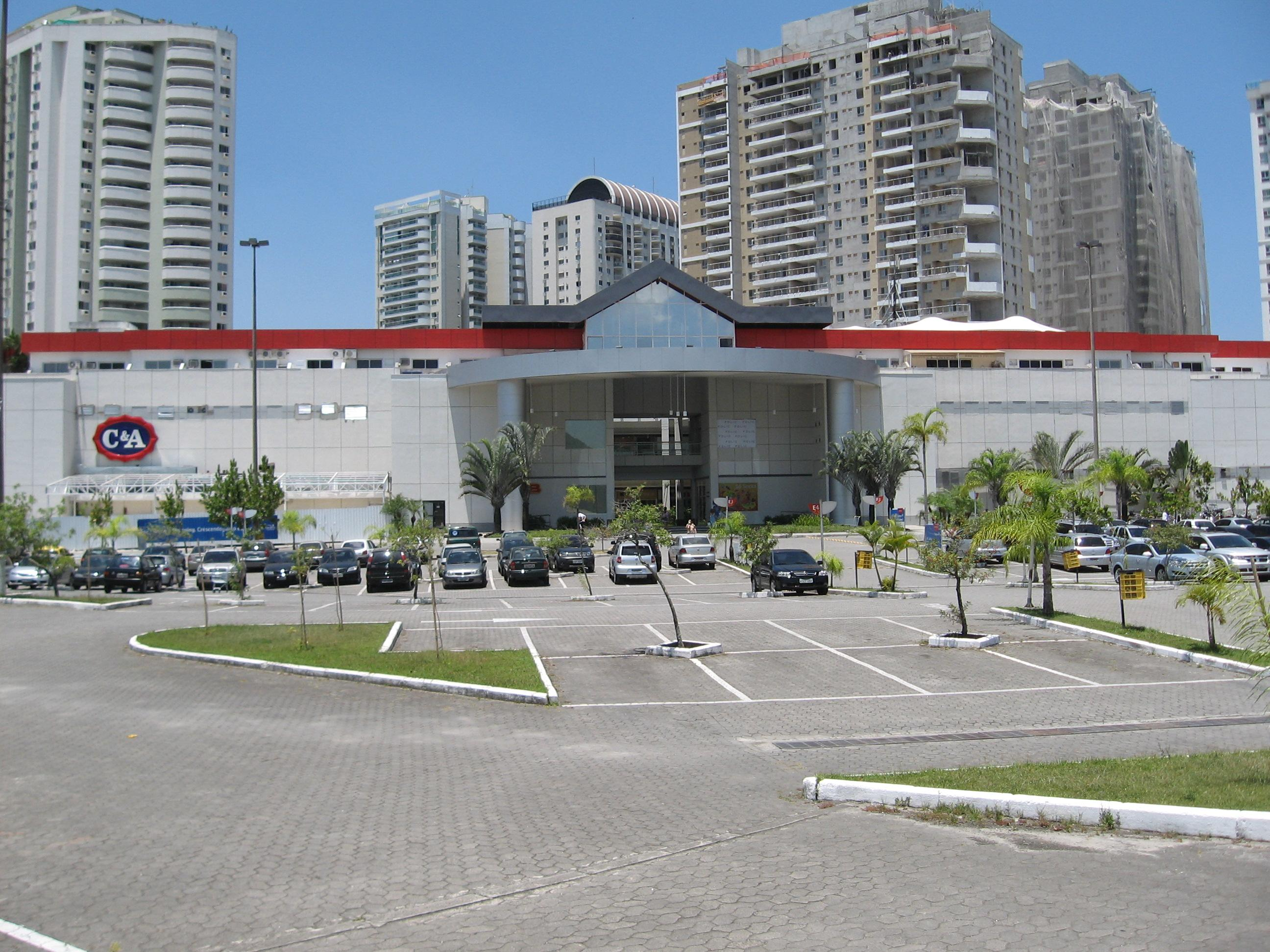
Recreio Shopping

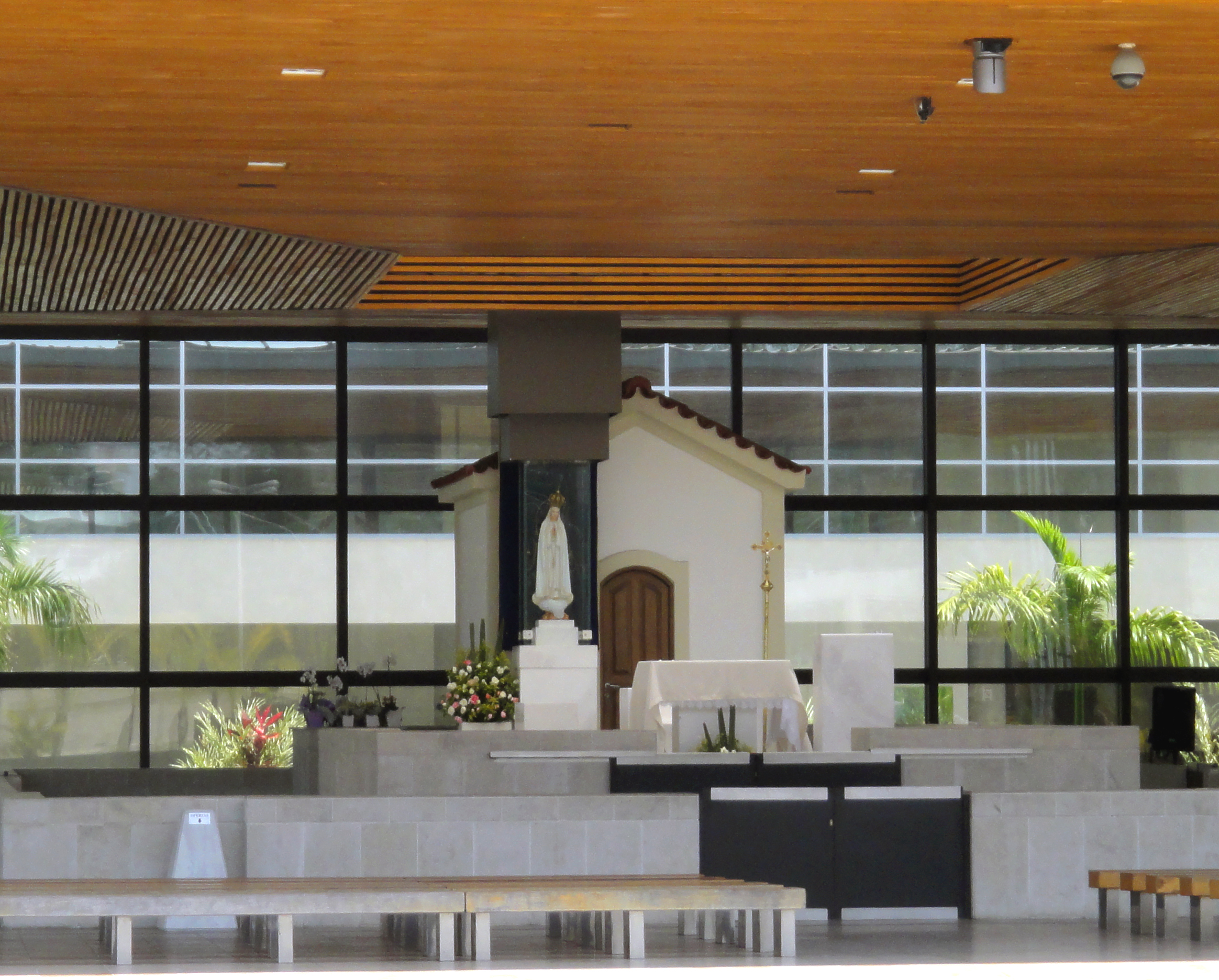
The chapel of the Sanctuary of Our Lady of Fátima

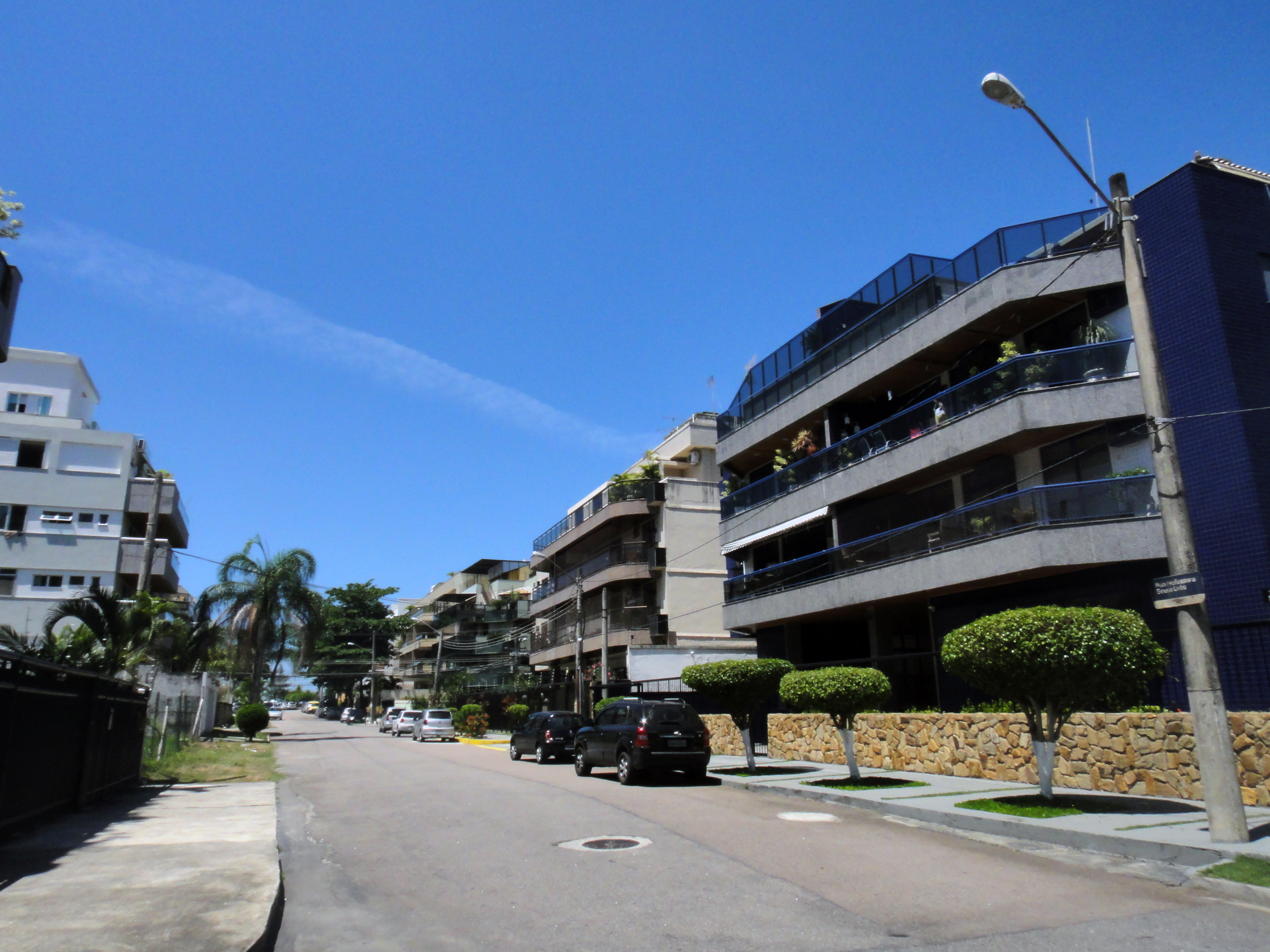
Low-rise buildings in Recreio dos Bandeirantes
