= Prim (given name) =

Prim is a given name. Notable people with the name include:

- Prim F. Escalona – American lawyer
- Prim Intawong (born 1970), Thai volleyball player
- Prim Lyza (born 1993), Cambodian actress
- Prim Pujals (born 1943), Dominican politician
- Prim Siripipat (born 1981), Thai former tennis player and sports anchor
- Prim Rouge, the Boscage Maze counterpart of Rouge from Sonic Prime

== See also ==
- Prim (surname)
- Prim Everdeen
