= Prim (surname) =

Prim is a surname. Notable people with the name include:

- Gaige Prim (born 1999), American basketball player
- Gaspar Prim (2002-2026), Argentine youtuber, streamer and humorist
- John G. A. Prim (1821–1875), Irish journalist and archaeologist
- Juan Prim (1814–1870), Spanish general and statesman
- Kristin Prim (born 1993), American fashion designer and publisher
- Paine Page Prim (1822–1899), American attorney and judge
- Randolph Prim (1896–1986), American baseball player
- Ray Prim (1906–1995), American baseball player
- Robert C. Prim (1921–2021), American mathematician and computer scientist
- Santiago Prim (born 1990), Argentine footballer
- Sonia Prim (born 1984), Spanish footballer
- Suzy Prim (1896–1991), French actress
- Tommy Prim (born 1955), Swedish cyclist
- William Prim (1882–1930), American baseball player

== See also ==
- Prim (given name)
