= Agnes Nunes =

Brazilian singer-songwriter (born 2002)

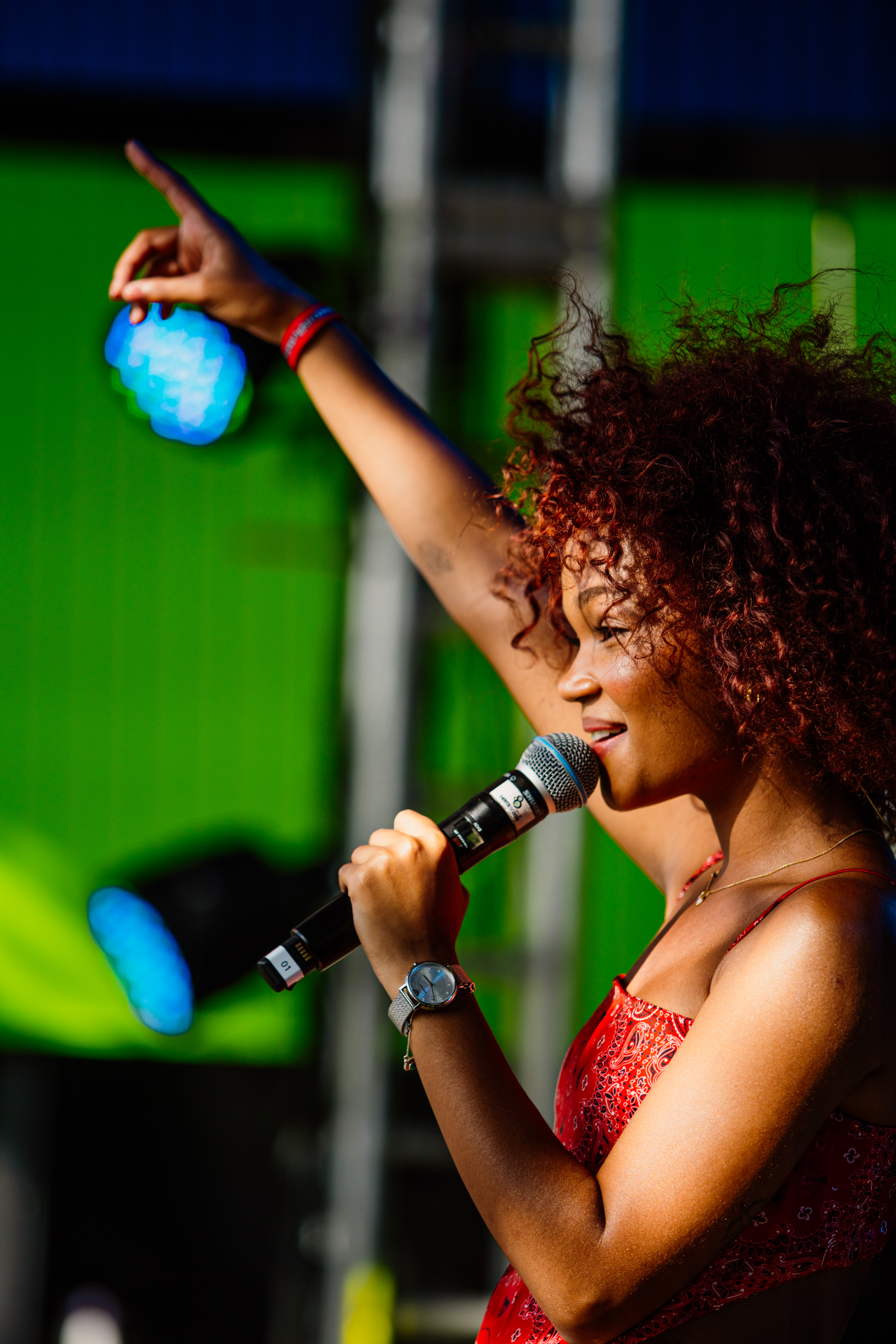
Agnes Nunes

Agnes Victoria Nunes Ferreira (born in Feira de Santana on April 5, 2002) is a Brazilian singer and songwriter.

== Early life ==
Agnes Victoria Nunes Ferreira was born in Feira de Santana, a city in the state of Bahia. She moved at nine months old with her mother, a university professor, to Jericó and later to Campina Grande, in Paraíba. At 12, she received a keyboard from her mother and developed her first musical works in Campina Grande. At 17, she moved with her mother to Rio de Janeiro.

== Career ==
She began her artistic career as a teenager, at 14 years old, when she started recording videos performing songs by other artists and posting them online.

In 2020, during the COVID-19 pandemic, she participated, alongside Elza Soares and Seu Jorge, in an online live stream. In the same year, she recorded the track "Escorpião" on the album "Zodíaco" by rapper Xamã.

Her first album titled "Menina Mulher" was recorded in 2022 and includes ten original tracks. In the same year, she re-recorded the song "Preciso Me Encontrar" by Cartola for the feature film "Executive Order", with screenplay and direction by Lázaro Ramos, and recorded with Ivete Sangalo the track "Tudo Vai Dar Certo" for Onda Boa, her new show on HBO Max. She also played Eva in the series "Only for Love", aired on Netflix.

She won the "Golden Lion" award in the "Entertainment" category at the Cannes International Festival of Creativity with the song "Together Magic Happens", composed for TV Globo's Christmas special. She also received the Young Brazilian Award in 2022.

In 2023, she toured Europe, performing in Portugal, Spain, Germany, and England. She was also part of the cast of the miniseries "Tá Tudo Certo", created and directed by Felipe Simas, aired on Disney+.

== Discography ==
=== Studio album ===
Title	Details
Menina Mulher	Released: January 28, 2022; Label: Baguá Records/ Universal Music; Format(s): Digital download, streaming, CD
