= Lucas A. Vignale =

Argentine director and screenwriter (1997–2026)

Lucas Vignale
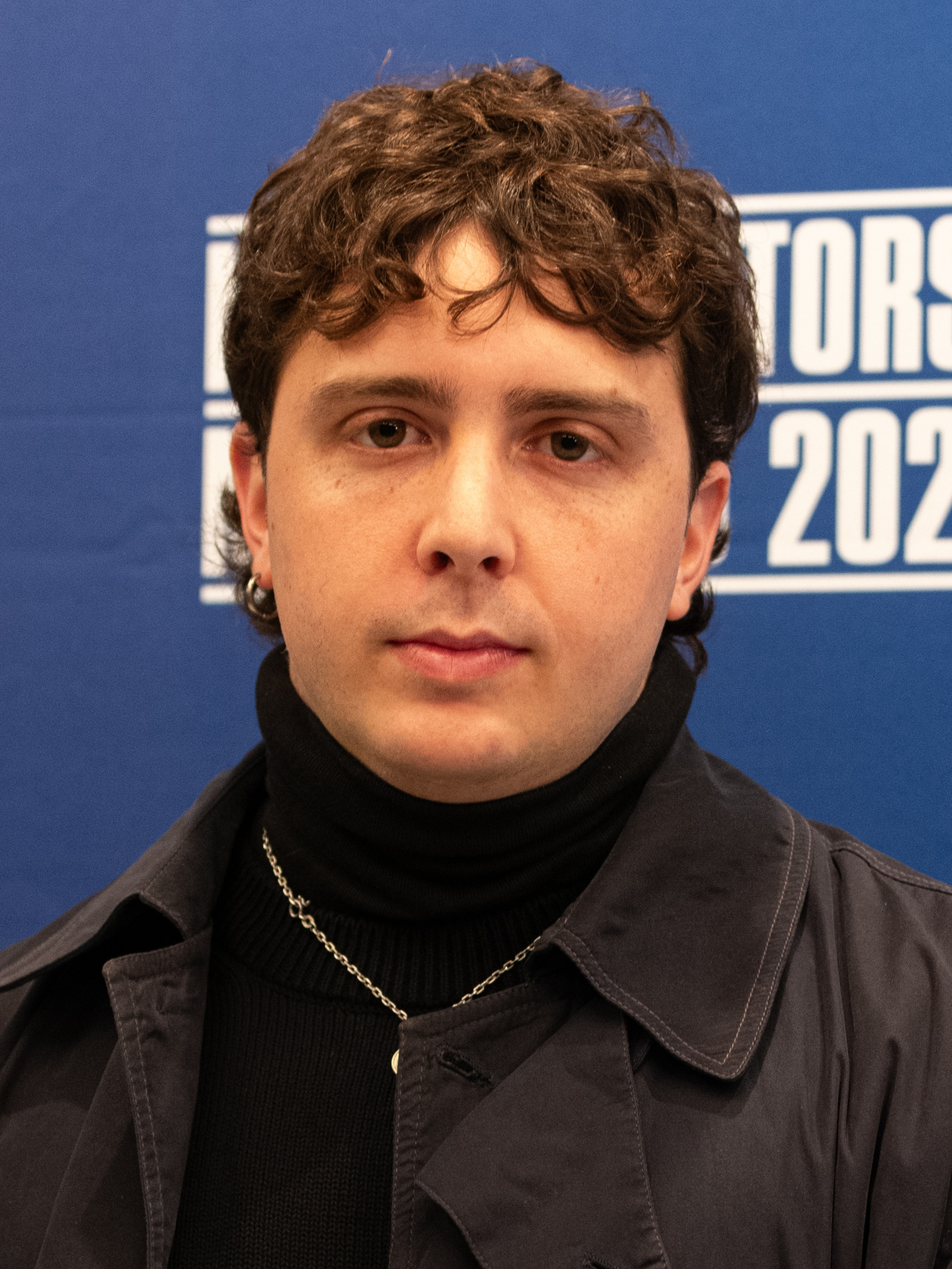
- Vignale in April 2026
- Born: Lucas Alejandro Vignale; 23 September 1997; Buenos Aires, Argentina
- Died: 14 June 2026 (aged 28); Rio de Janeiro, Brazil
- Education: Fundación Universidad del Cine
- Occupations: Director; screenwriter
- Years active: 2020–2026

Lucas Alejandro Vignale (23 September 1997 – 14 June 2026) was an Argentine director and screenwriter. He was best known for co-writing and co-directing the 2026 coming-of-age drama film The River Train along with Lorenzo Ferro.

== Life and career ==
Vignale was born in Buenos Aires on 23 September 1997. He graduated from Fundación Universidad del Cine. He collaborated with Trueno, Nicki Nicole, Duki, J Balvin, Wos, and Bizarrap, and won a Gardel Award in 2022, and was nominated for another one in 2024.

In 2023, Vignale signed with Underwonder Content, a content production company. In 2024, he co-wrote and co-directed the short film La Pasión along with Ferro, for which he and Ferro received the Stimulus Award for Argentine Cinema from the Buenos Aires International Festival of Independent Cinema for the short film. In 2026, his feature coming-of-age drama debut, The River Train, also co-directed with Ferro, premiered at the 76th Berlin International Film Festival.

== Death ==
In June 2026, Vignale and Argentine YouTuber Gaspi were in Brazil participating in events supporting American musician Oliver Tree's first world tour, promoting Tree's album Love You Madly Hate You Badly. On 14 June, Vignale, Gaspi, Tree and Brazilian music producer Lucas Frota were killed in a helicopter collision over Recreio dos Bandeirantes, in Rio de Janeiro. The helicopter the group were flying in collided with a second aircraft in mid-air, resulting in their deaths along with the helicopters' two pilots. Vignale was 28 years old.

== Filmography ==
=== Feature film ===
- The River Train (2026) – co-directed with Lorenzo Ferro

=== Short film ===
- Gaspi: Camino a la Velada (2025) – co-directed with Gaspi
- La vuelta de Gaspi (2024) – co-directed with Gaspi
- La Pasión (2024) – co-directed with Lorenzo Ferro
