= Javornice =

- Municipality
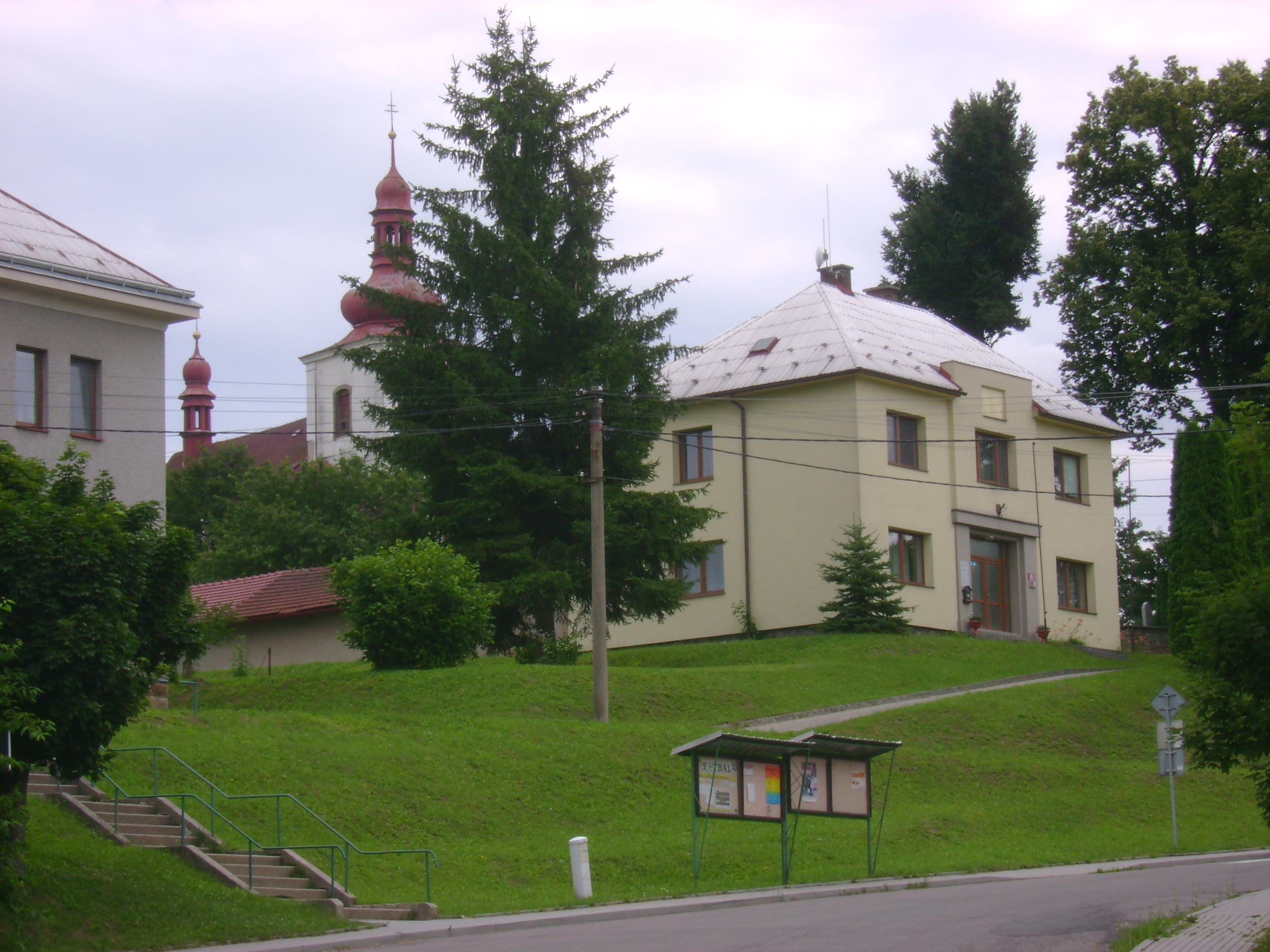
- Municipal office and the Church of Saint George

- Flag Coat of arms

- Location in the Czech Republic
- Coordinates: 50°10′17″N 16°20′58″E
- Country: Czech Republic
- Region: Hradec Králové
- District: Rychnov nad Kněžnou
- First mentioned: 1358

Area
  - Total: 18.41 km^{2} (7.11 sq mi)
- Elevation: 390 m (1,280 ft)

Population (2026-01-01)
  - Total: 1,122
  - Density: 60.95/km^{2} (157.8/sq mi)
- Time zone: UTC+1 (CET)
  - Summer (DST): UTC+2 (CEST)
- Postal code: 517 11
- Website: www.obecjavornice.cz

Javornice is a municipality and village in Rychnov nad Kněžnou District in the Hradec Králové Region of the Czech Republic. It has about 1,100 inhabitants.

== Administrative division ==
Javornice consists of three municipal parts (in brackets population according to the 2021 census):

- Javornice (971)
- Jaroslav (63)
- Přím (32)

== Demographics ==
Historical population
Year	Pop.	±%
1869	1,917	—
1880	1,930	+0.7%
1890	1,888	−2.2%
1900	1,816	−3.8%
1910	1,791	−1.4%
1921	1,711	−4.5%
1930	1,597	−6.7%
1950	1,270	−20.5%
1961	1,295	+2.0%
1970	1,072	−17.2%
1980	990	−7.6%
1991	829	−16.3%
2001	876	+5.7%
2011	933	+6.5%
2021	1,066	+14.3%
Source: Censuses
