= Prim Lyza =

- Born: December 25, 1993 (age 31); Singapore
- Occupation: Actress
- Years active: 2006-Present

Prim Lyza (Khmer: ព្រីម លីហ្សា, born December 25, 1993) is a Cambodian actress and fashion model.

== Early life ==
Lyza was born in Singapore on December 25, 1993. She was the fifth child in the family of six children. In 1999, Lyza's father died of illness, and she left Singapore to live in Phnom Penh with her mother who ran a business in Cambodia. In Phnom Penh, she attended the School of Fine Arts until grade ten.

== Career ==
Lyza started work in showbiz when she was 13 years old, and has appeared in works by production companies such as FCI, SSB, Hang Meas, and Sunday Productions. She has also acted in karaoke videos, television commercials, as well as in the music video for the Chhay Virakyuth song Money has killed my heart (Khmer: ទឹកលុយសំលាប់ទឹកចិត្តខ្ញុំ).

In 2009, she won second prize for Natural Beauty in The Secret of the Night program in Vietnam.

In 2013, Lyza received the Most Popular Actress award on Cambodian entertainment awards show Anachak Dara (Khmer: អាណាចក្រតារា, lit. 'Star Empire'). The award was decided by SMS voting rather than the awards committee; this led to some controversy with criticism on social media from people who felt that she was not deserving of the award.

== Filmography ==
Year	Title	Role	Notes	Ref
2005	Snake Queen (Khmer: រាជនីពស់)			
2006	Spirit of the Flower (Khmer: វិញាណនាងទងផ្កា)			
2006	Dance for a Year (Khmer: រាំរយឆ្នាំចាំស្នេហ៍)			
2006	Mysterious Palace Owner (Khmer: ម្ចាស់វិមានអាថ៌កំបាំង)			
2009	Tream Chet Samrab Chhu			
2010	Chanh Chet Tbet Sra Lanh			
2008	Trong Meas Baksey Sneh			
