= Jericó, Paraíba =

Jericó
- Municipality
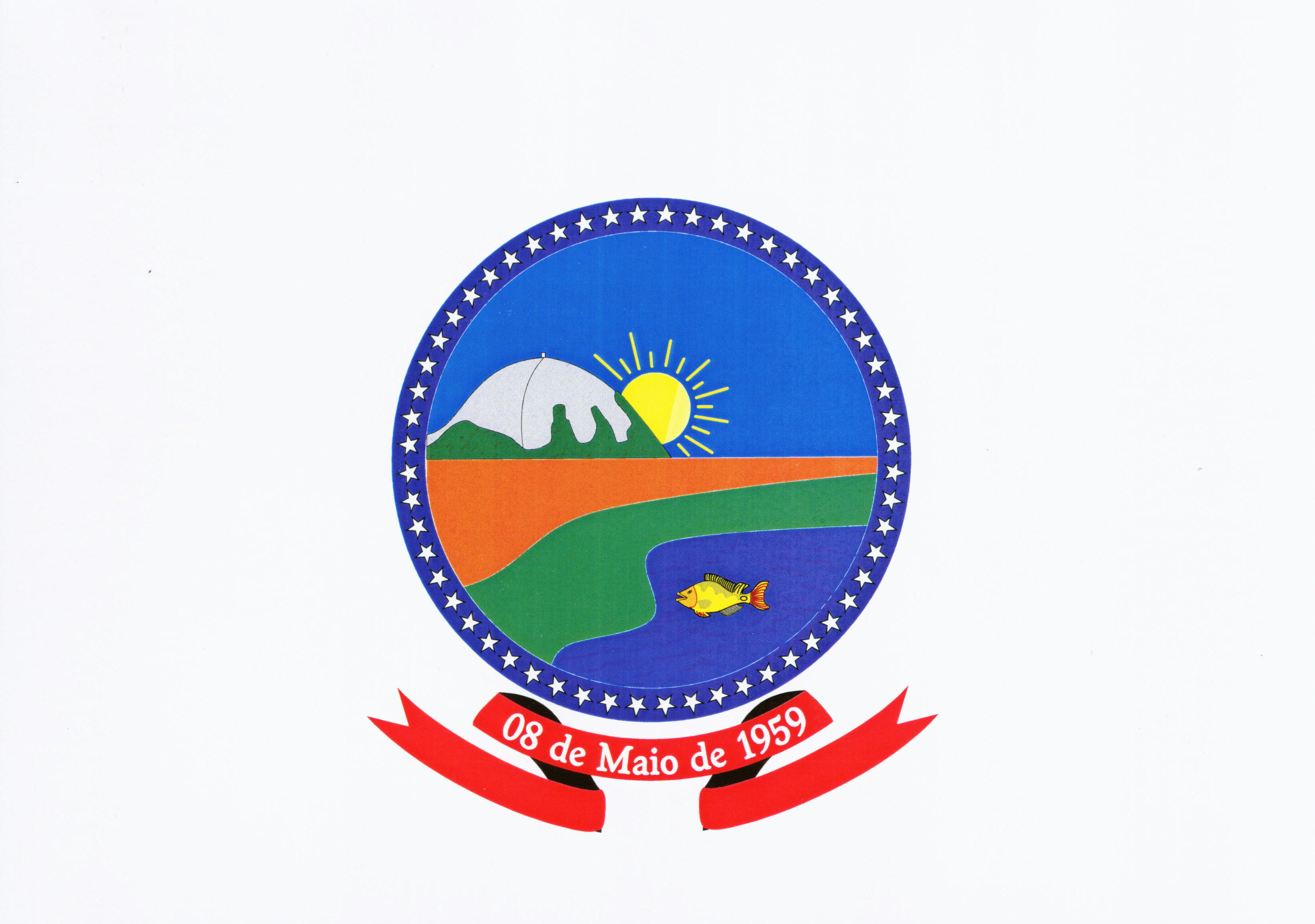
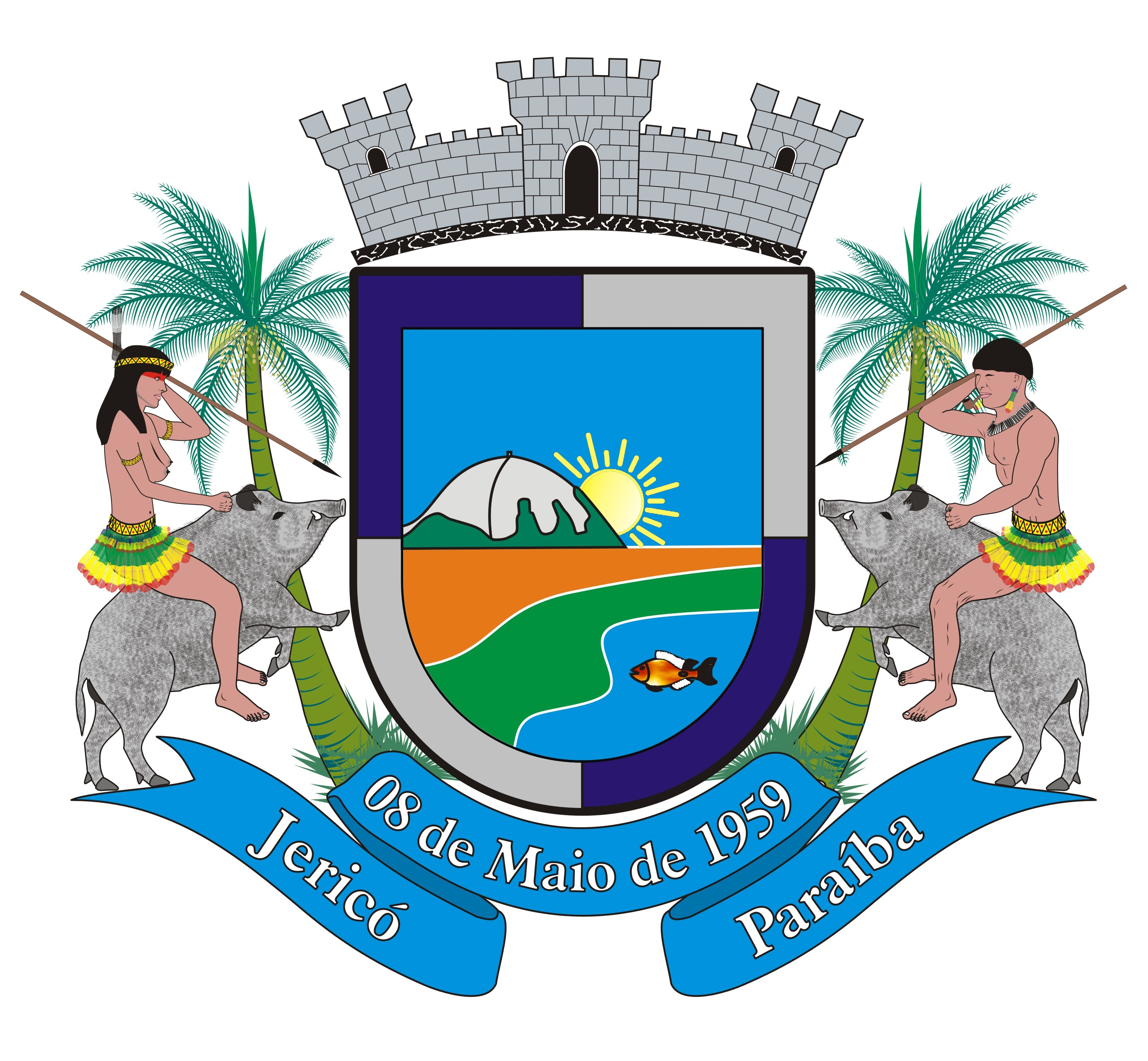
- Flag Coat of arms

- Location in Brazil
- Coordinates: 6°33′14″S 37°48′32″W
- Country: Brazil
- Region: Northeast
- State: Paraíba
- Mesoregion: Sertao Paraibana

Area
  - Total: 179.311 km^{2} (69.232 sq mi)
- Elevation: 250 m (820 ft)

Population (2020)
  - Total: 7,745
  - Density: 43.19/km^{2} (111.9/sq mi)
- Time zone: UTC−3 (BRT)

Jericó is a municipality in the state of Paraíba in the Northeast Region of Brazil.

== See also ==
- List of municipalities in Paraíba
