= 2026 Rio de Janeiro mid-air collision =

Two-helicopter aviation accident in Brazil

Accident
- Date: 14 June 2026
- Summary: Mid-air collision; under investigation
- Site: Recreio dos Bandeirantes, Rio de Janeiro, Brazil; R-RJ 23°01′02″S 43°28′49″W
- Total fatalities: 6
- Total survivors: 0

First aircraft
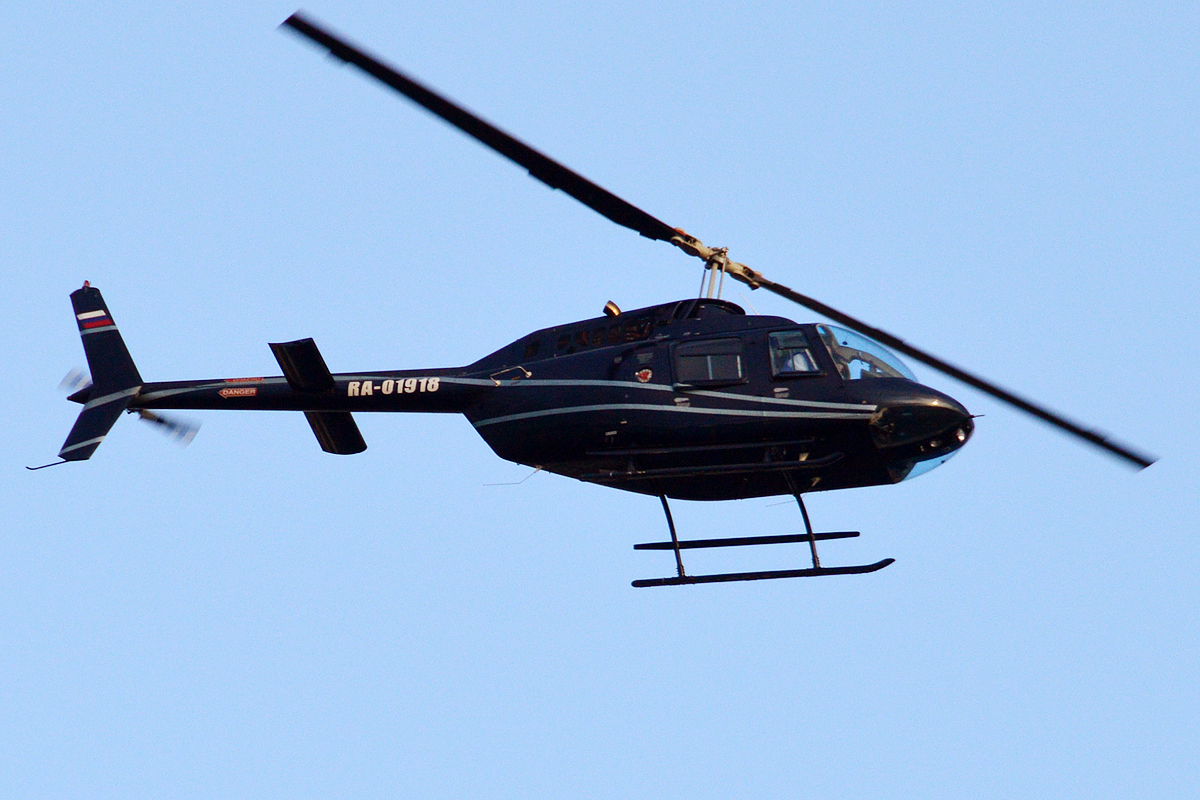
- A Bell 206 similar to the first helicopter involved
- Type: Bell 206B JetRanger II
- Operator: RG8 Aviation (Used by Turfik Comércio de Frutas Ltda.)
- Registration: PP-MAC
- Occupants: 5
- Passengers: 4
- Crew: 1
- Fatalities: 5
- Survivors: 0

Second aircraft
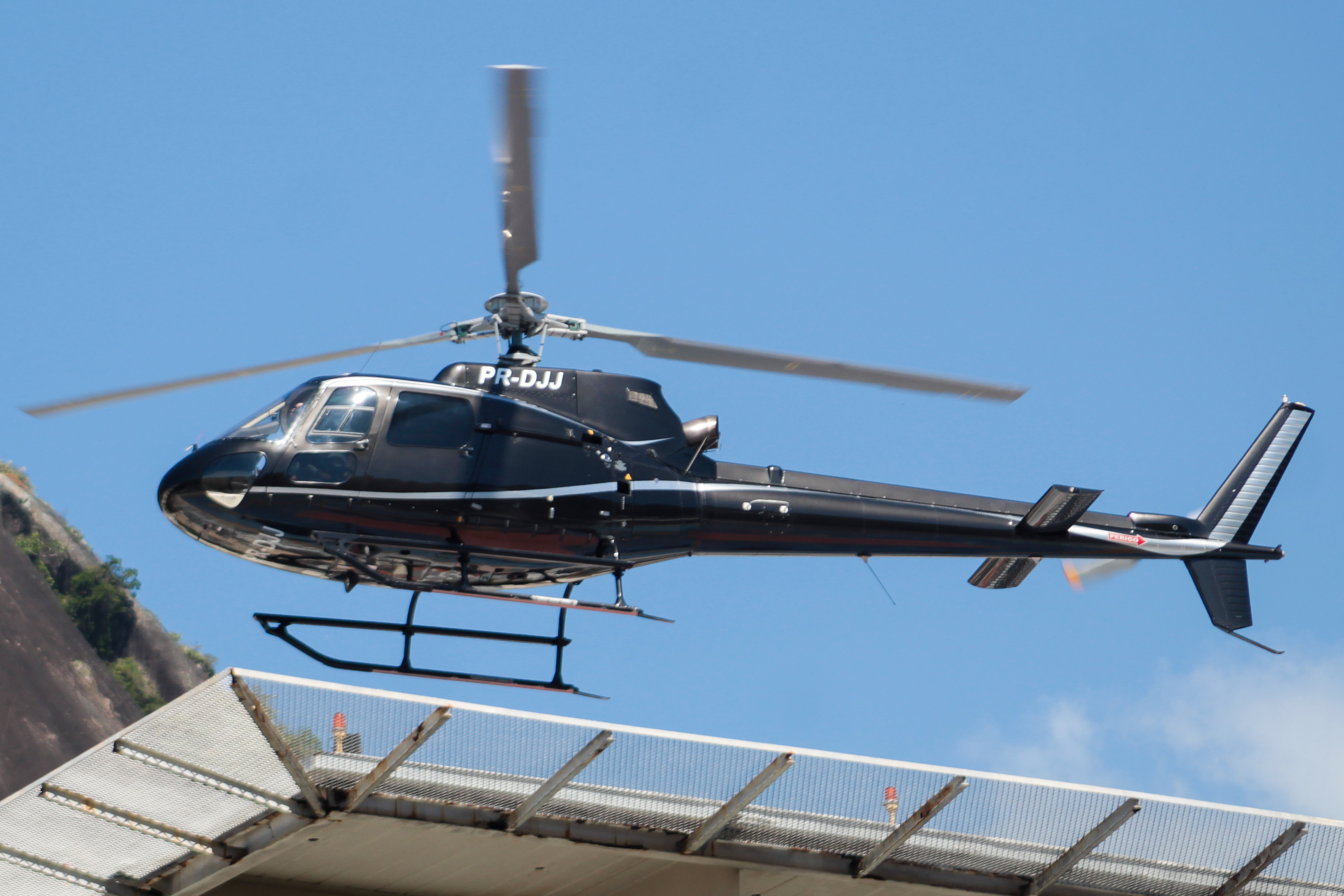
- PR-DJJ, the second helicopter involved in the collision, seen in 2025
- Type: Eurocopter HB350 B Esquilo
- Operator: Private
- Registration: PR-DJJ
- Destination: Carmelo Jordão-Angra dos Reis Airport
- Occupants: 1
- Passengers: 0
- Crew: 1
- Fatalities: 1
- Survivors: 0

On 14 June 2026, two helicopters collided mid-air in the Recreio dos Bandeirantes neighborhood, in the southwest zone of Rio de Janeiro, Brazil. The six victims were American singer-songwriter Oliver Tree, Argentine YouTuber Gaspi, Argentine director and screenwriter Lucas A. Vignale, Brazilian music producer Lucas Frota and pilots Alexandre Souza and Charles Marsillac.

== Background ==
=== Aircraft ===
The aircraft involved were PR-DJJ, a privately owned Eurocopter HB350 B Esquilo manufactured in 2012, and PP-MAC, a Bell 206B JetRanger III manufactured in 1999 and operated by RG8 Aviation, and legally registered as belonging to a fruit trading company in Brazil (Turfik Comércio de Frutas Ltda). Oswaldo de Luca Filho, the owner of PP-MAC, had previously been fined by the National Civil Aviation Agency of Brazil (ANAC) in July 2025 for refusing to show books, accounting documents, information, and statistics to inspection agents.

=== Passengers and crew ===
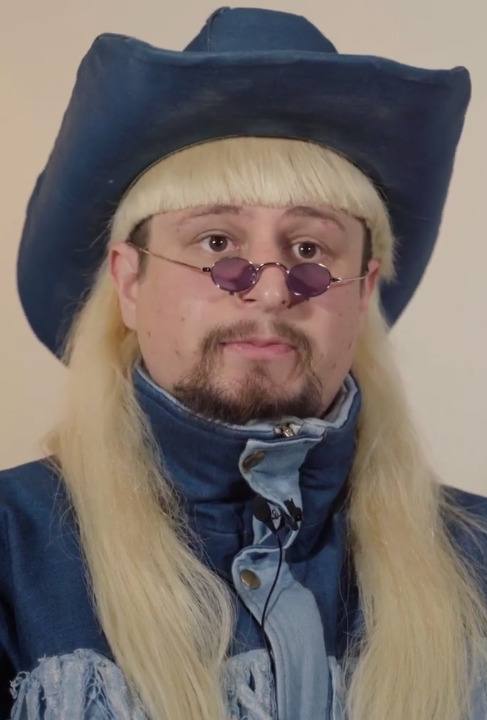
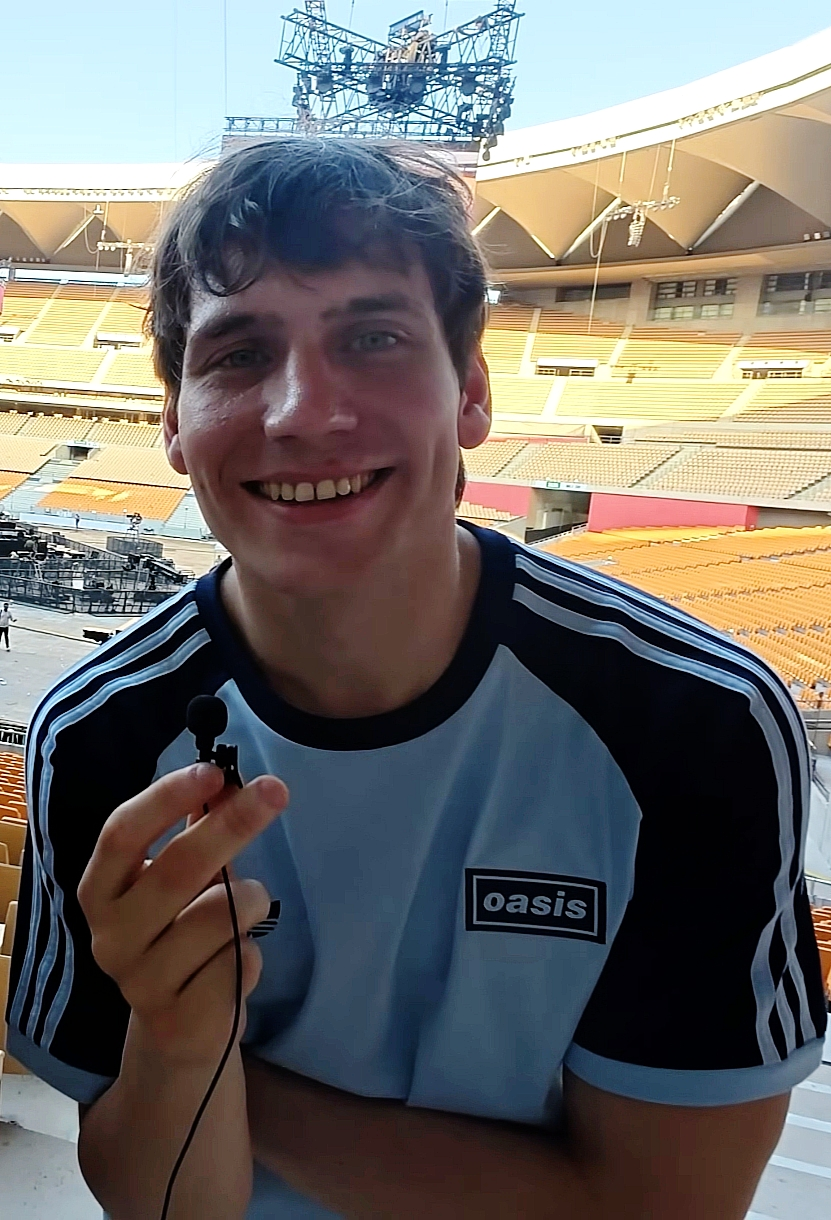
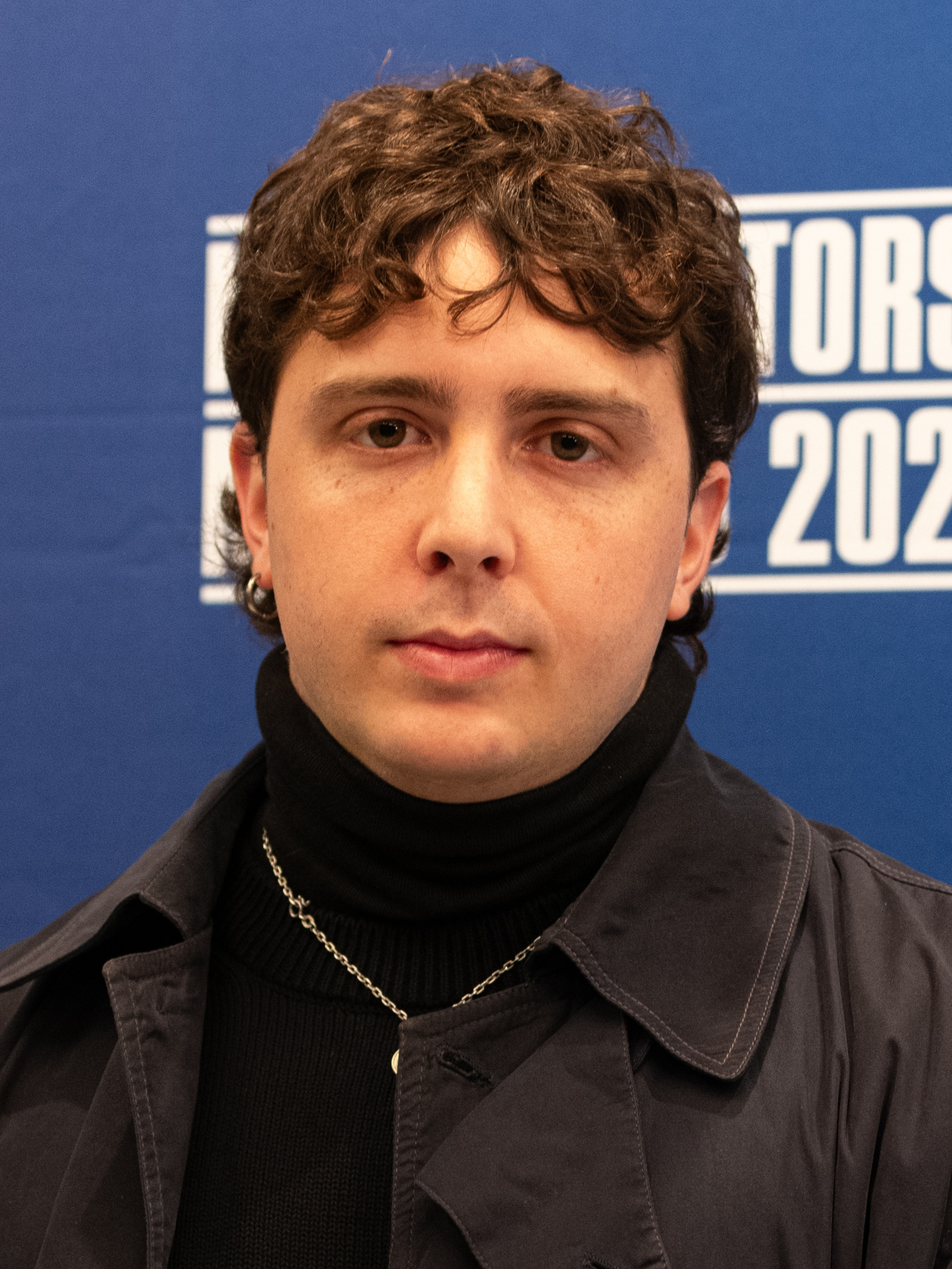
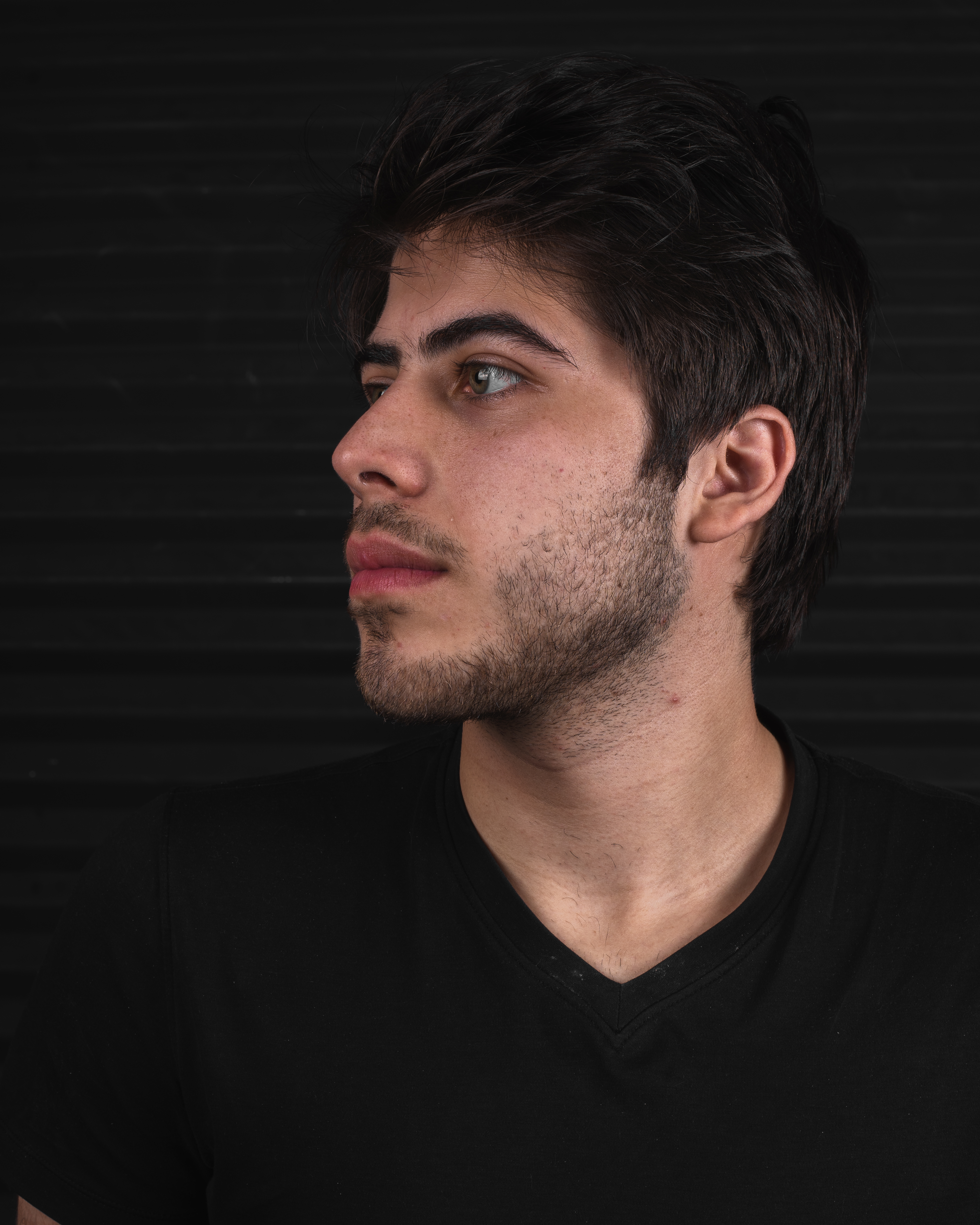
American singer-songwriter Oliver Tree, Argentine YouTuber Gaspi, Argentine director and screenwriter Lucas A. Vignale and Brazilian music producer Lucas Frota were among the victims of the accident

The pilot of the Bell helicopter was Alexandre Souza, and the passengers were Brazilian music producer Lucas Frota, American musician Oliver Tree, Argentine director and screenwriter Lucas A. Vignale, and YouTuber Gaspi. The sole occupant of the Eurocopter was pilot Charles Marsillac.

Tree was in Brazil for his World's First World Tour in support of the album Love You Madly Hate You Badly, which had 70 planned concerts across 30 countries. He performed a concert in São Paulo on 6 June, and his next concert was planned for 1 July in Lisbon, Portugal.

== Accident ==
CCTV footage showing the second helicopter falling to the ground

The first aircraft took off from Angra dos Reis, and the second from Jacarepaguá, both in compliance with regulations. The aircraft collided at roughly 8:59 a.m. Brasília time, above the grounds of an abandoned church that had been rented by a BYD car dealership, on the block of Avenida das Américas between Beth Lago and Rivadávia Campos streets. The Bell exploded upon impact, causing a fire that affected about 20 cars. The column of smoke was seen for miles around, including from the Zico Football Center. The Eurocopter did not catch fire and crashed with its landing gear facing upwards. Fuselages were scattered within a radius of at least 100 m (330 ft), with a tail section being found on the roof of a neighboring building. A security camera captured one of the helicopters falling. A witness reportedly saw one of the helicopters in flames, and a passenger jumping from another aircraft before it hit the ground.

== Aftermath ==
About 45 military personnel and 15 vehicles were deployed to the scene. A lane of the avenue was closed for rescue operations. By 10:00 a.m., the fire had been brought under control, and firefighters were searching for fuel leaks. Most of the bodies from the Bell 206 were burned beyond recognition. Shortly after the crash, Brazilian authorities were able to confirm the identities of five out of the six victims. However, Tree's body, which sustained extensive damage, was unable to be confirmed at the time. On June 16, dental analysis confirmed Tree as the sixth deceased.

Following the crash, Claudio Caiado, state deputy in the Legislative Assembly of Rio de Janeiro, proposed a bill providing for greater transparency, monitoring and sanctions for air operations in the state.

== Victims ==
Local sources reported the list of the victims:

Occupants of the Bell 206:

- Alexandre Souza, Brazilian pilot
- Oliver Tree, American singer-songwriter and rapper
- Lucas A. Vignale, Argentine director and screenwriter
- Gaspi, Argentine YouTuber and streamer
- Lucas Frota, Brazilian music producer and DJ

Occupant(s) of the AS350:

- Charles Marsillac, Brazilian pilot

== Investigation ==
The Aeronautical Accidents Investigation and Prevention Center unit of the Brazilian Air Force and the National Civil Aviation Agency confirmed they will investigate the accident. The local fire department, the Traffic Engineering Company, and the 31st Military Police Battalion were working on the site. Local civil police requested a forensic examination of the site. Hours after the crash, Eduardo Cavaliere, mayor of Rio de Janeiro, said that there were "foreign nationals on board one of the aircraft" without specifying who. Fire services spokesman Lieutenant Colonel Fabio Contreiras said information was still preliminary, and that the crash could have been more serious considering the surrounding residences. Brazilian police investigator Alan Luxardo said that human error was a possible crash cause, noting that police were determining if the pilot or air traffic controllers were responsible.

== Reactions ==
Numerous notable figures made social media tributes to Tree. Several Brazilian artists and others gave their condolences in response to the deaths. In the Spanish-speaking world, many YouTubers and streamers mourned the accident and death of Gaspi.

== See also ==
- List of accidents and incidents involving helicopters
- List of fatalities from aviation accidents
- 1960 Rio de Janeiro mid-air collision
- The Day the Music Died - another aviation incident involving the death of multiple famous celebrities.
