= Gaspi =

Argentine YouTuber (2002–2026)

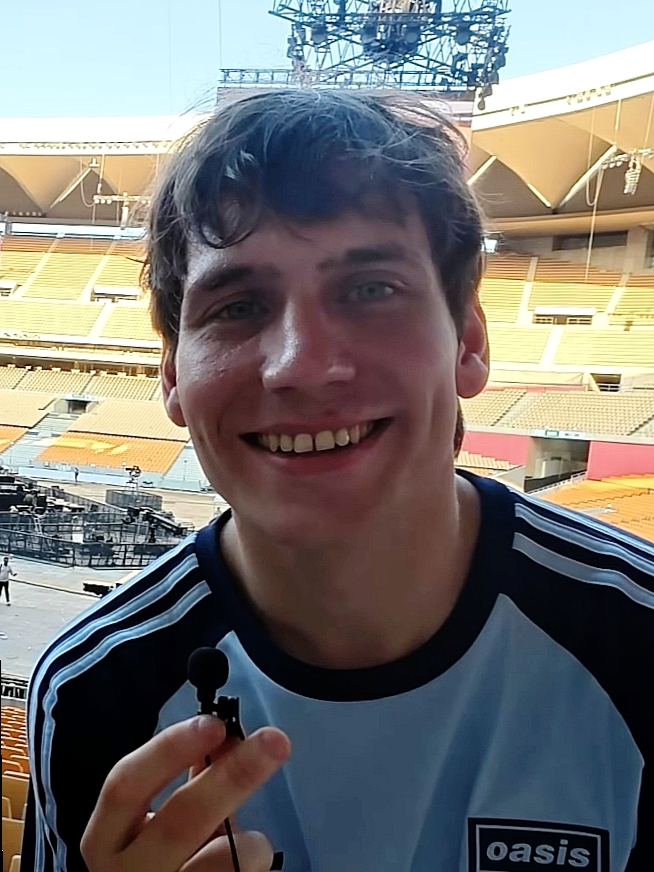
- Prim in 2025
- Born: Gaspar Prim Díaz; 28 December 2002; Buenos Aires, Argentina
- Died: 14 June 2026 (aged 23); Rio de Janeiro, Brazil
- Citizenship: Argentina; Chile
- Occupations: YouTube personality; humorist; streamer
- Years active: 2013–2026

YouTube information
- Channel: Gaspi
- Genre: Comedy
- Subscribers: 3.27 million
- Views: 90.5 million
- Last updated: 18 August 2026

Gaspar Prim Díaz (28 December 2002 – 14 June 2026), better known as Gaspi, was an Argentine YouTuber and Internet personality.

Prim registered his YouTube channel in late 2013, and had few subscribers but published numerous streams. He initially gained traction a few years later on Instagram, before returning to YouTube and achieving significant popularity in 2021. In his YouTube videos, he would mainly post street interviews incorporating dark humor and sexually suggestive questions or jokes, while also posting himself making crude remarks to strangers.

On 14 June 2026, Prim died in an aviation collision in Rio De Janeiro, Brazil, which also resulted in the deaths of five others including singer/songwriter Oliver Tree.

== Life and career ==
Prim was born on 28 December 2002, in Buenos Aires, Argentina. He also held Chilean dual citizenship, living in La Serena for four years, and had formerly played football for the junior divisions of Club Deportivo Universidad de Chile and Deportes La Serena.

Starting his YouTube channel in December 2013, Prim initially gained a following on Instagram. In 2021, he returned to his YouTube channel and began publishing various videos there, and he subsequently rose to greater popularity, accumulating, as of July 2026, 3.26 million subscribers to his channel, despite having published only a handful of videos. Between 2022 and 2024, he took a hiatus from posting content.

Prim was known for his provocative street interviews where he asked controversial questions to passers by, with his content often featuring dark humor and sexual references. His controversial style resulted in a number of his videos being removed from online platforms.

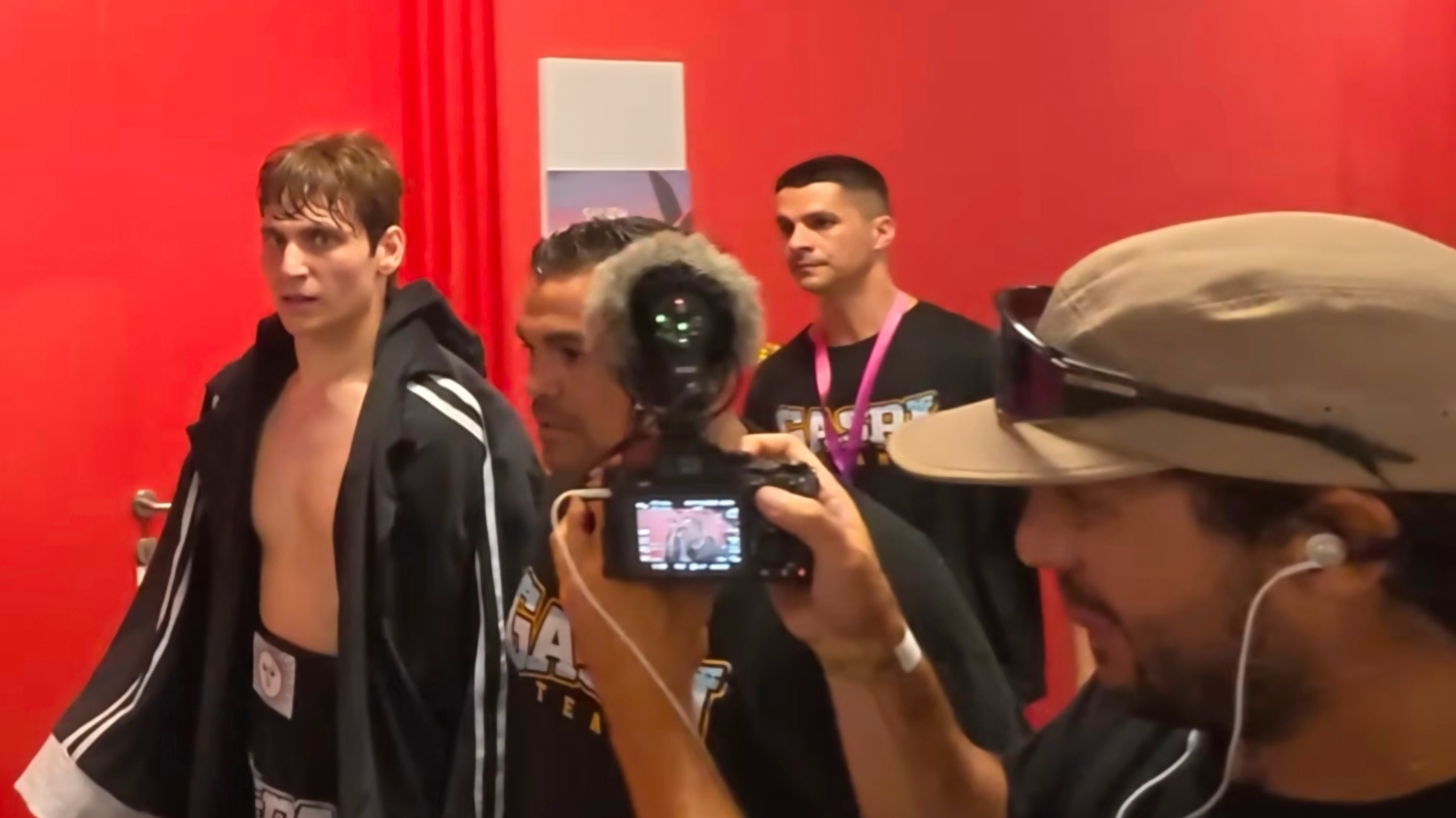
Prim at La Velada del Año 5 with his team

On 26 July 2025, Prim participated in La Velada del Año 5, the fifth event of the La Velada del Año, an annual boxing competition featuring various online personalities. He lost by knockout in the first round against Perxitaa.

Up until his death, Prim widened the format of his videos, incorporating vlogs, interviews, and direct rebroadcasting. He also started addressing more serious themes, tending to politics and social questions, using his comic style to comment upon actuality. In May 2026, he announced the series Gaspi visita tu hogar (Gaspi visits your home).

== Death ==
In June 2026, Prim and fellow Argentine Lucas A. Vignale were in Brazil and took part in events linked to American singer Oliver Tree's first world tour, which promoted his album Love You Madly Hate You Badly. On 14 June, Prim, Tree, Vignale, and three other people were killed in an aerial collision that occurred at Recreio dos Bandeirantes, in Rio de Janeiro. Prim was 23 years old. After his death, Gaspi visita tu hogar was cancelled.

== Videography ==
As of 2026, Prim only has nine public videos on his YouTube channel. They are listed in the column below (translated from Spanish).

#	Video name	Views (mil.)	Upload date	Video
1	Gaspi Makes People Angry in the Street	15.8	3 September 2021	
2	Gaspi	12.8	13 October 2021	
3	Gaspi on the Way to the Evening	11.7	15 July 2025	
4	Gaspi's Forbidden Video	12.1	23 November 2021	
5	Gaspi's Return	10.7	23 December 2025	
6	Gaspi	9.3	22 December 2022	
7	Gaspi Meets Lady With Problems	7.3	6 October 2021	
8	Ibai and Gaspi at an Unexpected Dinner!	6.9	23 March 2025	
9	Gaspi in Spain - The Documentary	3.7	2 October 2025	

== Awards ==
Year	Award	Category	Resultado	Ref.
2022	Coscu Army Awards	YouTuber of the Year	Won	
