= Castor Gardens, Philadelphia =

Neighborhood of Northeast Philadelphia

Castor Gardens
- Neighborhood of Philadelphia
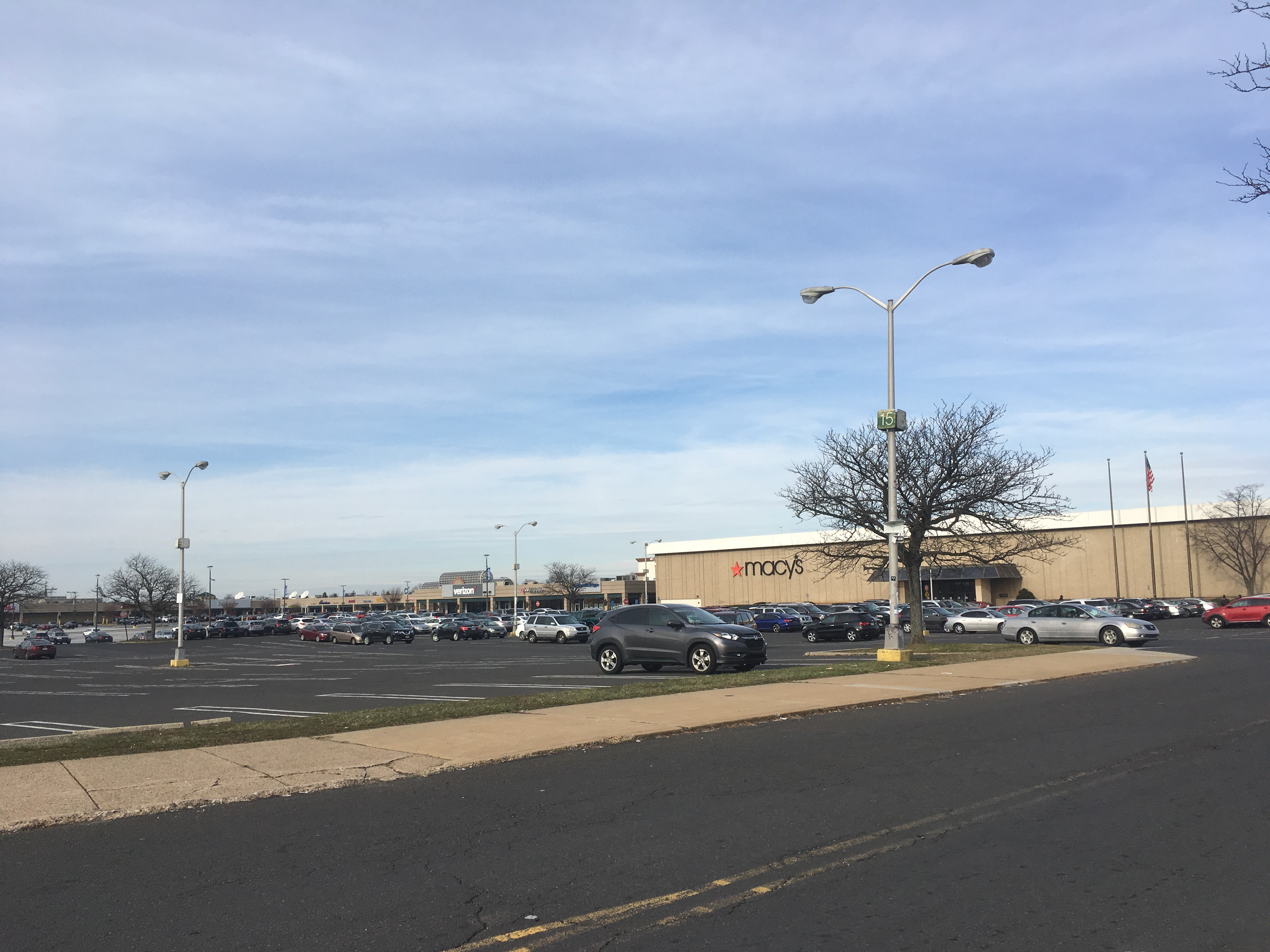
- Castor Gardens is the location of Roosevelt Mall

- Location within Philadelphia
- Country: United States
- State: Pennsylvania
- County: Philadelphia
- City: Philadelphia
- Area codes: 215, 267, and 445

Castor Gardens is a neighborhood in the lower Northeast section of Philadelphia, Pennsylvania, United States. Castor Gardens' borders are not clearly defined, but it exists in the vicinity of Castor Avenue and Cottman Avenue. It is also near Roosevelt Boulevard. The neighborhood can either be entered from the south, by taking the Oxford Circle exit of Roosevelt Boulevard, or from the north, by taking the Cottman Avenue exit. Adjacent neighborhoods are Mayfair, Lawndale, Burholme, Oxford Circle, and Rhawnhurst.

Castor Gardens uses the zip codes 19111 and 19149. Physical boundaries are: Pennway Street to the west, Roosevelt Boulevard to the east, Cottman Avenue on the north, and Van Kirk Avenue on the south.

The area is served by Roosevelt Mall, one of the largest shopping centers in Philadelphia, the Northeast Regional Library branch of the Free Library of Philadelphia, and the District 10 Health Center of the city of Philadelphia.

== History ==
Castor Gardens was the name of a development of detached homes built north of Magee Avenue, on the east side of Whitaker Avenue. Its name is derived from Castor's mill, which was located to the south of Little Tacony Creek, where it would have crossed Castor Avenue (referred to as "Hartshorne'Rd." on some maps. This was near present-day Magee. Creek is now under the streets.

The brick colonial homes of Castor Gardens were considered more prestigious than the row homes located south of Magee Avenue, which were part of the neighborhood known as Oxford Circle (getting its name from the traffic circle located at the juncture of Oxford Avenue, Castor Avenue, and Roosevelt Boulevard, formerly known as Hunter's Circle).

As the neighborhood developed, the area between Magee and Cottman Avenue, Whitaker Avenue and Castor Avenue was mostly semi-detached and detached homes. To differentiate this area from the row homes south of Magee and east of Castor Avenue, the use of the name Castor Gardens began in the 1950s.

As people began to indicate a preference for Castor Gardens as opposed to Oxford Circle, the name was applied to a larger and larger area, first encompassing the newest row homes in the area (north of Tyson Avenue) and eventually encompassing the entire area formerly known as Oxford Circle, while that name was relegated to the homes located south of Oxford Avenue which were older and smaller homes mostly built in the 1920s and 1930s. The housing stock in Castor Gardens were built as early as the 1930s, with construction halted during the years of World War II. The housing boom after World War II fueled additional construction, with the last homes being built on streets located along Cottman Avenue in 1956. Some spot building (building completed on a lot by lot basis) continued to the present day.

Castor Gardens Middle School, (then Woodrow Wilson Junior High School), which resides within the neighborhood, was listed on the National Register of Historic Places in 1986.

On January 31, 2025, Med Jets Flight 056, a medical-purpose Learjet 55 carrying a child patient, their mother, and four crew members crashed in the area of the Roosevelt Mall 41 seconds after taking off from Northeast Philadelphia Airport while bound for Tijuana International Airport via Springfield–Branson National Airport. All 6 people on the flight were killed, while the resulting explosion caused two deaths and 24 injuries on the ground as well as major fires at the adjacent row homes.

== Demographics ==
Historically, Castor Gardens was primarily white, middle class Jewish community, but starting the past decade, the area has experienced significant change with the integration of Koreans, Cambodians, Hispanics, Arabs, African Americans, Chinese, Indians, and Brazilians.

== Government ==
Political leaders of note who were residents of Castor Gardens at one time include former Councilman-at-Large Jack Kelly, former Congressman Charles F. Dougherty, the late Congressman Joshua Eilberg, and the late leader of the Northeast Mental Health and Mental Retardation Center Anthony Iannerelli. Philadelphia Controller Alan Butkovitz currently resides there with his wife Theresa. Notable Republican William G. Baumbach III and also Mark Cohen had long resided there.

A Democratic stronghold, the area is split into many political districts. It is currently represented in the United States House of Representatives by Brendan Boyle, in the Pennsylvania State Senate by Christine Tartaglione, and in the Pennsylvania House of Representatives by Jared Solomon. The Ninth District seat on the City Council (which includes this area) is presently vacant.

== Education ==
Castor Gardens Middle School, 1800 Cottman Avenue, is in Castor Gardens.

=== Public libraries ===
Free Library of Philadelphia operates the Bushrod Branch at 6304 Castor Avenue at Stirling Street.

The Northeast Regional Library, also part of the Free Library of Philadelphia, is the largest and most well known library in Castor Gardens and is located at 2228 Cottman Ave at Oakland Street.
