= 2026 Palm Beach County Learjet 60 crash =

Aviation accident in Florida, US

- The crater caused by the crash.

Accident
- Date: November 1, 2026
- Summary: Crashed en route, in-flight structural failure; under investigation
- Site: Palm Beach County, Florida, US; 26°37′58.4″N 80°06′47.2″W

Aircraft
- N722BD, the aircraft involved in the accident, pictured in 2024
- Aircraft type: Learjet 60
- Operator: Aurora Aviation (dba Upper Jets)
- Registration: N722BD
- Flight origin: Austin–Bergstrom International Airport, Austin, Texas, US
- Destination: North Eleuthera Airport, North Eleuthera, The Bahamas
- Occupants: 9
- Passengers: 7
- Crew: 2
- Fatalities: 9
- Survivors: 0

Ground casualties
- Ground injuries: 1

On November 1, 2026, a privately owned Learjet 60 business jet crashed in Palm Beach County, Florida, United States, while en route from Austin–Bergstrom International Airport in Texas to North Eleuthera Airport in the Bahamas. The plane crashed after a high-speed descent, killing all nine people on board and injuring one on the ground.

== Aircraft and crew ==
The aircraft was a Learjet 60 private business jet with registration number N722BD, manufactured in 2004. Its registered owner was LR60271 LLC, with an address in New Castle County, Delaware. The aircraft was operated by Aurora Aviation, doing business as Upper Jets. It departed from Austin–Bergstrom International Airport in Austin, Texas, and was heading for North Eleuthera Airport on the island of Eleuthera in the Bahamas.

There were nine people on board, including two crew members: captain Jeff Gregory, and first officer Nathalia Gadelha Filgueiras from Boca Raton, Florida.

== Accident ==
Altitude and speed

Radio traffic between first officer Filgueiras and ATC during the flight's final moments. The recording is trimmed to remove silence and communications with other aircraft.

The aircraft departed Austin–Bergstrom International Airport at 10:37 a.m. EST.

At approximately 12:40 p.m., around 10 minutes before the crash, first officer Filgueiras reportedly sent a text message to her boyfriend, who was also a pilot, stating, "I've got turbulence, I've got ice." The message was described by her stepfather in an interview with the New York Post.

At 12:47 p.m., the plane was heading eastbound at 35,000 feet (10,700 m) when the pilots reported turbulence with altitude deviations of about 700 feet (210 m), icing, precipitation, and low outside air temperatures of −47 °C (−53 °F). They requested a climb to 37,000 feet (11,300 m) which was authorized by air traffic control (ATC).

Shortly after, the aircraft entered a steep dive, with a rate of descent increasing to over 30,000 feet per minute (150 m/s). At 12:48 p.m., Filgueiras radioed a "mayday" call to ATC, reporting a deteriorating situation. The plane descended from 35,250 feet (10,740 m) to 8,750 feet (2,670 m) in one minute, immediately before it crashed, according to the Federal Aviation Administration (FAA). The final transmission from the aircraft to ATC occurred about 35 seconds after the mayday call was made.

The aircraft hit the ground in an almost vertical nosedive, near the intersection of Military Trail (SR 809) and 10th Avenue North in unincorporated Palm Beach County, nearly hitting a home in the Greenacres Mobile Home Community, a few miles south of President Donald J. Trump International Airport and southwest of Mar-a-Lago. The crash was recorded by the dashcam of a passing vehicle.

The airplane disintegrated upon impact while fuel exploded into a fireball. The crash left a large smoldering crater in the side of the road. Nearby power lines and underground water mains were severed by the impact, and traffic in the area was disrupted. One witness stated that the aftermath "looked like a meteor hit the ground".

== Victims and aftermath ==
All nine occupants of the aircraft were killed in the crash. The seven passengers were a tech entrepreneur, his wife, their two young children, the children's nanny, and two family friends. The crash is the deadliest involving a Learjet 60.

One person on the ground sustained injuries while traveling in a nearby vehicle. Approximately 600 residents of a nearby mobile home community were evacuated or displaced following the accident, and two emergency shelters were made available to accommodate affected residents. United Way created a relief fund for people displaced by the crash or affected concurrent flooding in the county.

The crash created a large impact crater on Military Trail, forcing the closure of the roadway between 10th Avenue North and Purdy Lane/Alameda Drive until further notice. Nearby businesses and residents were also affected by power outages and restricted access to the surrounding area. John I. Leonard Community High School, a public high school located near the crash site, was closed on November 2 as emergency crews and investigators continued operations in the vicinity.

== Investigation ==
NEXRAD radar image of storms over southern Florida five minutes before the crash. A circle highlights a 30-kilometer (19 mi; 16 nmi) radius around the impact site.

CVR at the NTSB Vehicle Recorders Laboratory.

The National Transportation Safety Board (NTSB) and the Federal Aviation Administration (FAA) launched an investigation into the accident, with the NTSB serving as the lead investigative agency under Investigation ID ERA27MA026. The Palm Beach County Sheriff's Office closed Military Trail near the impact site to facilitate the emergency response and investigation.

Thunderstorms were in the area at the time of the crash, with visibility ranging from 2 to 10 miles (3.2 to 16.1 km) and surface wind gusts of 20 to 30 miles per hour (32 to 48 km/h). Meteorological analysis indicated that the aircraft passed through a stronger thunderstorm cell several minutes before entering its rapid descent, although it remained unclear whether the weather contributed to the accident.

According to recorded air traffic control communications, the crew reported light clear icing and moderate turbulence while flying at approximately 35,000 feet (10,700 m), with altitude fluctuations of up to 700 feet (210 m). The crew subsequently requested permission to climb to 37,000 feet (11,300 m) before declaring an emergency as the aircraft entered a rapid descent. The pilots reported an overspeed condition and a descent rate exceeding 20,000 feet per minute (6,100 m/min; 370 km/h; 230 mph) shortly before impact.

During a press briefing on November 2, NTSB board member Tom Chapman stated that investigators had found indications that the aircraft may have begun breaking apart before impact, suggesting that aircraft components could be located some distance from the main crash site. On November 3, Chapman confirmed that part of the tail had separated prior to impact. The left elevator was found in three pieces, 1.3 to 3.8 miles (2.1 to 6.1 km) from the crash site.

Recovery of major wreckage from the impact crater was identified as a significant challenge, as the crater subsequently filled with water from severe ongoing storms. Excavation of the crash site began late November 4 and was completed by November 9; the cockpit voice recorder (CVR) was recovered.

== Responses ==
Florida governor Ron DeSantis described the crash as "cataclysmic", and praised emergency workers for their swift response.

United States secretary of transportation Sean Duffy called the event a "horrific tragedy" on social media and confirmed the FAA was assisting the NTSB in their investigation.

NASA administrator Jared Isaacman defended the copilot (Filgueiras) after the crash due to the negative view expressed by various online comments regarding the crash. One of Filgueiras' flight instructors also defended her.

== See also ==
- Med Jets Flight 056, a Learjet 55 that crashed in 2025 following a high-speed descent
