= 2013 Philadelphia municipal election =

2013 Pennsylvania local election

2013 Philadelphia elections
- November 5, 2013

A general election was held in Philadelphia, Pennsylvania on November 5, 2013 to elect various county and city-level positions. The primary election was held on May 21, 2013.

== District Attorney ==
2013 Philadelphia district attorney election
- November 5, 2013
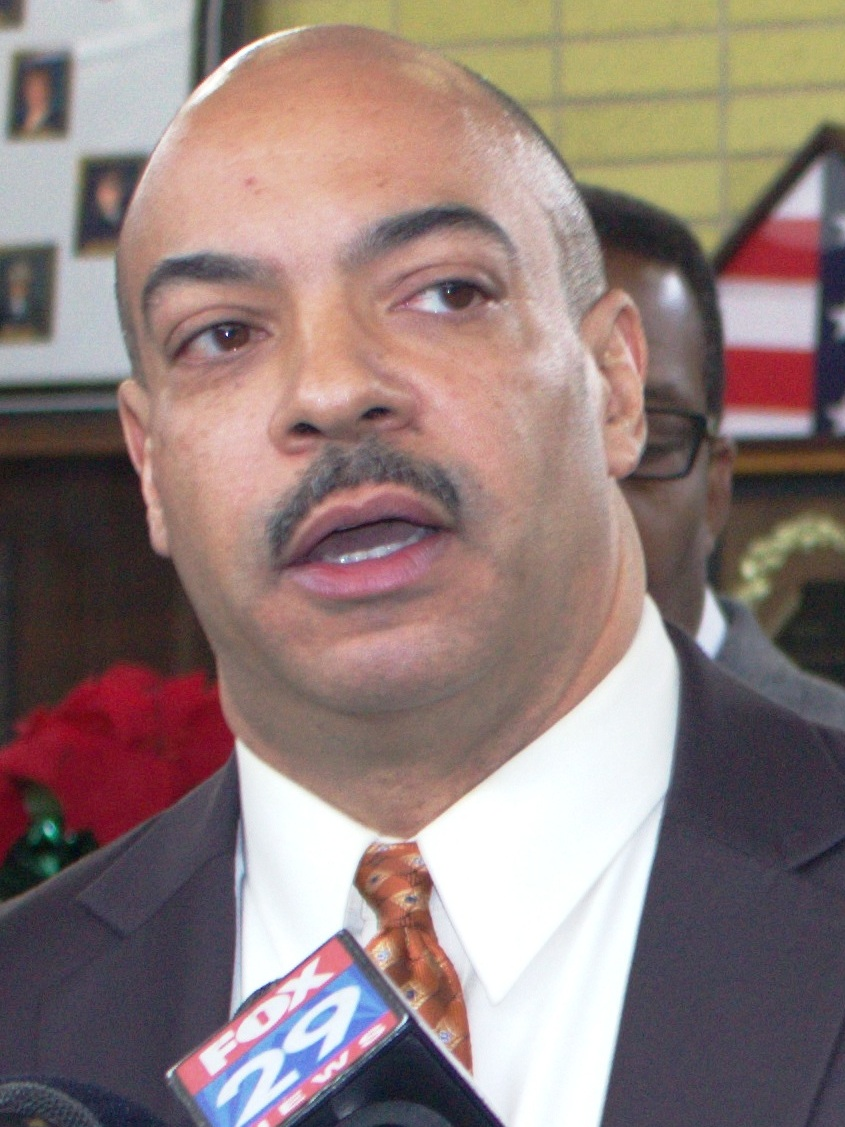

Candidate	Seth Williams	Daniel Alvarez
Party	Democratic	Republican
Popular vote	89,238	21,058
Percentage	80.88%	19.09%
- Williams: 50–60% 60–70% 70–80% 80–90% >90% Alvarez: 50–60% 60–70% 70–80% 80–90% >90% Tie: 50%
District Attorney before election
Seth Williams
Democratic
Elected District Attorney
Seth Williams
Democratic

Incumbent district attorney Seth Williams was reelected to a second term, winning in a landslide.

=== Democratic primary ===
==== Nominee ====
- Seth Williams, incumbent District Attorney (2010–present)

==== Results ====
Democratic primary results
Party	Candidate	Votes	%
Democratic	Seth Williams (incumbent)	57,947	100.00
Total votes		57,947	100.00

=== Republican primary ===
==== Nominee ====
- Daniel Alvarez, lawyer and former assistant district attorney

==== Results ====
Republican primary results
Party	Candidate	Votes	%
Republican	Daniel Alvarez	6,408	100.00
Total votes		6,408	100.00

=== General election ===
==== Results ====
2013 Philadelphia District Attorney election
Party	Candidate	Votes	%
Democratic	Seth Williams (incumbent)	89,238	80.88
Republican	Daniel A. Alvarez	21,058	19.09
Write-in		41	0.04
Total votes		110,337	100.00
Democratic hold			

== City Controller ==
2013 Philadelphia city controller election
- November 5, 2013

Candidate	Alan Butkovitz	Terrence Tracy
Party	Democratic	Republican
Popular vote	88,339	18,860
Percentage	82.37%	17.59%
- Butkovitz: 50–60% 60–70% 70–80% 80–90% >90% Tracy: 50–60% 60–70% 70–80% Tie: 50%
City Controller before election
Alan Butkovitz
Democratic
Elected City Controller
Alan Butkovitz
Democratic

Incumbent City Controller Alan Butkovitz won reelection in a landslide.

=== Democratic primary ===
==== Nominee ====
- Alan Butkovitz, incumbent City Controller (2006–present)

==== Eliminated in primary ====
- Brett Mandel, author, non-profit executive, and Democratic Committeeperson
- Mark Zecca, attorney and former assistant district attorney

==== Results ====
Primary results by ward Butkovitz: 40%–50%; 50%–60%; 60%–70%; 70%–80%; Mandel: 40%–50%; 50%–60%; 60%–70%

Democratic primary results
Party	Candidate	Votes	%
Democratic	Alan Butkovitz (incumbent)	38,733	61.18
Democratic	Brett Mandel	19,542	30.87
Democratic	Mark Zecca	5,034	7.95
Total votes		63,309	100.00

=== Republican primary ===
==== Nominee ====
- Terrence Tracy, retail business manager

==== Results ====
Republican primary results
Party	Candidate	Votes	%
Republican	Terrence Tracy	6,539	100.00
Total votes		6,539	100.00

=== General election ===
==== Results ====
2013 Philadelphia City Controller election
Party	Candidate	Votes	%
Democratic	Alan Butkovitz (incumbent)	88,339	82.37
Republican	Terrence Tracy	18,860	17.59
Write-in		49	0.05
Total votes		107,248	100.00
Democratic hold			

== Court of Common Pleas partisan election ==
=== Democratic primary ===
==== Results ====
Democratic primary results (vote for up to 6)
Party	Candidate	Votes	%
Democratic	Timika Lane	34,225	11.57
Democratic	Joe Fernandes	26,886	9.09
Democratic	Anne Marie Coyle (Note: Cross-filed for the Republican Party nomination.)	26,204	8.86
Democratic	Daniel McCaffery	25,948	8.77
Democratic	Giovanni Campbell	21,960	7.42
Democratic	Sierra Thomas Street	19,076	6.45
Democratic	Dawn M. Tancredi	18,540	6.27
Democratic	Vince Giusini	17,272	5.84
Democratic	Tracy B. Roman	16,342	5.52
Democratic	Kenneth J. Powell Jr.	14,330	4.84
Democratic	Leon A. King II	13,096	4.43
Democratic	Stephanie M. Sawyer	12,168	4.11
Democratic	James C. Crumlish	12,114	4.10
Democratic	John J. O'Connor Jr.	7,671	2.59
Democratic	Derrick W. Coker	5,028	1.70
Democratic	Deborah D. Cianfrani	4,763	1.61
Democratic	Diane A. Grey Jr.	4,387	1.48
Democratic	Rania Major	4,064	1.37
Democratic	Frank Bennett	3,321	1.12
Democratic	Conor Corcoran	3,185	1.08
Democratic	Sean P. Stevens	2,680	0.91
Democratic	Jon Marshall	1,976	0.67
Democratic	Katie Scrivner	377	0.13
Democratic	Fran Shields	174	0.06
Total votes		295,787	100.00

=== Republican primary ===
==== Results ====
Republican primary results (vote for up to 6)
Party	Candidate	Votes	%
Republican	Anne Marie Coyle (Note: Cross-filed for the Democratic Party nomination.)	6,409	56.07
Republican	Kenneth J. Powell Jr.	5,022	43.93
Total votes		11,431	100.00

=== General election ===
==== Results ====
2013 Philadelphia Court of Common Pleas election (vote for up to 6)
Party	Candidate	Votes	%
Democratic	Anne Marie Coyle	75,482	12.97
Republican	Anne Marie Coyle	16,442	2.83
Total	Anne Marie Coyle	91,924	15.80
Democratic	Daniel McCaffery	79,742	13.71
Democratic	Giovanni Campbell	78,373	13.47
Democratic	Timika Lane	77,646	13.35
Democratic	J. Scott O'Keefe	77,148	13.26
Democratic	Joe Fernandes	76,121	13.08
Democratic	Sierra Thomas Street	73,633	12.66
Republican	Kenneth J. Powell Jr.	19,092	3.28
Libertarian	Stephen Miller Miller	7,998	1.37
Write-in		97	0.02
Total votes		581,774	100.00

== Court of Common Pleas retention elections ==
Justice Jacqueline F. Allen retention, 2013
Choice	Votes	%
For	49,170	81.02
Against	11,515	18.98
Total	60,685	100.00
Source: Philadelphia City Commissioners

Justice Genece E. Brinkley retention, 2013
Choice	Votes	%
For	45,007	76.96
Against	13,477	23.04
Total	58,484	100.00
Source: Philadelphia City Commissioners

Justice Ramy I. Djerassi retention, 2013
Choice	Votes	%
For	40,796	74.48
Against	13,979	25.52
Total	54,775	100.00
Source: Philadelphia City Commissioners

Justice Lori A. Dumas retention, 2013
Choice	Votes	%
For	46,188	79.89
Against	11,628	20.11
Total	57,816	100.00
Source: Philadelphia City Commissioners

Justice Holly J. Ford retention, 2013
Choice	Votes	%
For	45,054	79.27
Against	11,784	20.73
Total	56,838	100.00
Source: Philadelphia City Commissioners

Justice Joel Steven Johnson retention, 2013
Choice	Votes	%
For	43,773	77.62
Against	12,623	22.38
Total	56,396	100.00
Source: Philadelphia City Commissioners

Justice Frederica A. Massiah-Jackson retention, 2013
Choice	Votes	%
For	46,134	77.65
Against	13,277	22.35
Total	59,411	100.00
Source: Philadelphia City Commissioners

Justice Rayford A. Means retention, 2013
Choice	Votes	%
For	41,464	75.67
Against	13,334	24.33
Total	54,798	100.00
Source: Philadelphia City Commissioners

Justice Jeffrey P. Minehart retention, 2013
Choice	Votes	%
For	44,945	78.63
Against	12,212	21.37
Total	57,157	100.00
Source: Philadelphia City Commissioners

Justice Joseph D. O'Keefe retention, 2013
Choice	Votes	%
For	46,289	79.31
Against	12,076	20.69
Total	58,365	100.00
Source: Philadelphia City Commissioners

Justice Nina Wright Padilla retention, 2013
Choice	Votes	%
For	46,691	79.93
Against	11,724	20.07
Total	58,415	100.00
Source: Philadelphia City Commissioners

Justice Paula A. Patrick retention, 2013
Choice	Votes	%
For	45,424	79.99
Against	11,363	20.01
Total	56,787	100.00
Source: Philadelphia City Commissioners

Justice Doris A. Pechkurow retention, 2013
Choice	Votes	%
For	40,996	76.26
Against	12,760	23.74
Total	53,756	100.00
Source: Philadelphia City Commissioners

Justice Allan L. Tereshko retention, 2013
Choice	Votes	%
For	41,888	75.94
Against	13,270	24.06
Total	55,158	100.00
Source: Philadelphia City Commissioners

== Philadelphia Municipal Court partisan election ==
=== Democratic primary ===
==== Results ====
Democratic primary results (vote for up to 3)
Party	Candidate	Votes	%
Democratic	Martin Coleman	32,797	22.63
Democratic	Henry Lewandowski	30,114	20.78
Democratic	Fran Shields	23,150	15.97
Democratic	Tracy B. Roman	20,017	13.81
Democratic	Shoshana Bricklin	11,067	7.64
Democratic	Robert M. Kline	7,002	4.83
Democratic	Diane A. Grey Jr.	6,514	4.49
Democratic	Joe Fernandes	6,248	4.31
Democratic	Frank Bennett	5,018	3.46
Democratic	Conor Corcoran	2,895	2.00
Democratic	Derrick W. Coker	120	0.08
Total votes		144,942	100.00

=== General election ===
==== Results ====
2013 Philadelphia Municipal Court election (vote for up to 3)
Party	Candidate	Votes	%
Democratic	Martin Coleman	80,911	34.16
Democratic	Fran Shields	79,092	33.40
Democratic	Henry Lewandowski	76,754	32.41
Write-in		77	0.03
Total votes		236,834	100.00

== Philadelphia Municipal Court retention elections ==
Justice Teresa Carr Deni retention, 2013
Choice	Votes	%
For	46,290	76.80
Against	13,980	23.20
Total	60,270	100.00
Source: Philadelphia City Commissioners

Justice Jacquelyn Frazier-Lyde retention, 2013
Choice	Votes	%
For	46,611	73.89
Against	16,473	26.11
Total	63,084	100.00
Source: Philadelphia City Commissioners

Justice Joseph J. O'Neill retention, 2013
Choice	Votes	%
For	44,682	74.49
Against	15,305	25.51
Total	59,987	100.00
Source: Philadelphia City Commissioners

Justice Wendy L. Pew retention, 2013
Choice	Votes	%
For	46,367	79.04
Against	12,296	20.96
Total	58,663	100.00
Source: Philadelphia City Commissioners

== Philadelphia Traffic Court partisan election ==
Elections were originally to be held to fill the three vacancies on the Philadelphia Traffic Court. On June 19, 2013, Pennsylvania Governor Tom Corbett signed Senate Bill 334 into law, abolishing the court. Its functions were transferred to the Philadelphia Municipal Court. A companion bill was also in the legislative process to abolish the court from the Pennsylvania Constitution. As such, while primary elections were held as scheduled, no general election took place.

=== Democratic primary ===
==== Results ====
Democratic primary results (vote for up to 3)
Party	Candidate	Votes	%
Democratic	Omar Sabir	23,194	16.36
Democratic	Donna DeRose	14,489	10.22
Democratic	Marnie Aument Loughrey	12,884	9.09
Democratic	Warren Bloom	9,544	6.73
Democratic	Donna Marie Laws	8,904	6.28
Democratic	Lewis Harris Jr.	8,682	6.12
Democratic	Tia M. Seibert	8,236	5.81
Democratic	Inja Coates	7,132	5.03
Democratic	Suzanne Harmon Carn	7,053	4.97
Democratic	Bobbie T. Curry	3,985	2.81
Democratic	Ashley Michelle Cook	3,943	2.78
Democratic	Sharif Ali	3,531	2.49
Democratic	Tyrone T. Martin	3,270	2.31
Democratic	Jose A. Figueroa	3,091	2.18
Democratic	Robert Turek	3,034	2.14
Democratic	Ryan Mulvey	2,801	1.98
Democratic	Brigitte A. Garvin Johnson	2,645	1.87
Democratic	David Mamikonyan	2,600	1.83
Democratic	Bruce H. Bailey	2,445	1.72
Democratic	Holly A. Harris Seidle	2,216	1.56
Democratic	Wayne E. Dorsey	1,922	1.36
Democratic	Keith Jackson	1,732	1.22
Democratic	Verna Ragan Tennant	1,704	1.20
Democratic	James Johnson	1,527	1.08
Democratic	Kyle J. Sampson	1,206	0.85
Total votes		141,770	100.00

=== Republican primary ===
==== Results ====
Republican primary results
Party	Candidate	Votes	%
Republican	Christopher M. Vogler	5,523	51.86
Republican	Ella P. Butcher	5,127	48.14
Total votes		10,650	100.00

== Ballot questions ==
One bond question appeared on the general election ballot, which was handily passed.

=== General election ===
Bond proposal results by ward Yes: 50%–60%; 60%–70%; 70%–80%; No: 50%–60%; 60%–70%

Authorize $94.745 million in bonds for capital projects
Choice	Votes	%
For	45,749	64.46
Against	25,228	35.54
Total	70,977	100.00
Source: Philadelphia City Commissioners
