= Philadelphia crash =

Philadelphia crash may refer to:

- 2015 Philadelphia train derailment
- Med Jets Flight 056
