= Rhawnhurst, Philadelphia =

Neighborhood of Philadelphia, USA

Rhawnhurst
- Neighborhood of Philadelphia
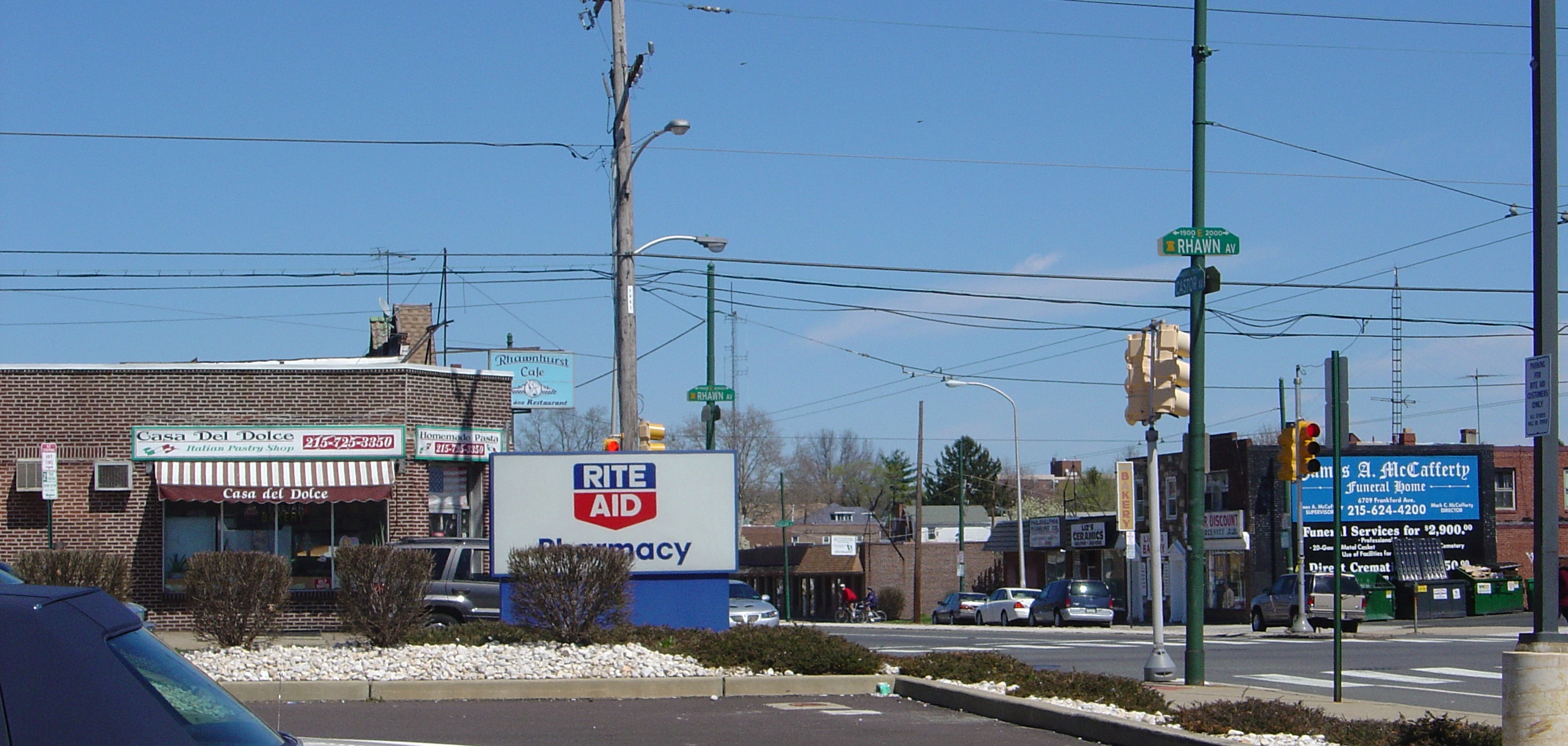
- The intersection of Rhawn Street and Castor Avenue in Rhawnhurst

- Location within Philadelphia
- Country: United States
- State: Pennsylvania
- County: Philadelphia County
- City: Philadelphia
- ZIP code: 19152, parts of 19111
- Area codes: 215, 267 and 445

Rhawnhurst is a residential neighborhood in the Northeast section of Philadelphia, Pennsylvania, United States, named for George and William Rhawn by area real estate developers. Roughly bordered by Cottman Avenue to the south, Pennway Street to the west, the Pennypack Creek to the north, and Roosevelt Boulevard to the east, Rhawnhurst encompasses ZIP codes 19152 and part of ZIP code 19111. The geographic center of Rhawnhurst is at the intersection of Castor Avenue and Rhawn Street.

== History ==
By 1940, development in Philadelphia had almost reached Cottman Avenue, but large areas of the Northeast, including Rhawnhurst, were still farmland. Though much development had taken place in neighboring Mayfair, the area between Pennypack Park and Cottman Avenue west of the Roosevelt Boulevard had not been subdivided. The baby boom after World War II caused a demand for housing that continued into the 1960s. The new housing stock was built in the open areas of Northeast Philadelphia. Most homes in Rhawnhurst are twins, along with some ranchers and duplexes, largely built by local home builder A.P. Orleans.

== Transportation ==
The two major modes of transportation in Rhawnhurst are private car and public transportation. Major roads include Cottman Avenue (PA 73), Bustleton Avenue (PA 532), Castor Avenue, Rhawn Street, and the Roosevelt Boulevard (U.S. 1). The intersection of Cottman Avenue and the Roosevelt Boulevard is one of the most dangerous in the city; recently red light cameras were installed there to reduce traffic violations. (In a ranking done by State Farm Insurance in 2001, 2 of the 10 most dangerous intersections in the U.S. were on the Roosevelt Boulevard.) Several SEPTA bus lines serve Rhawnhurst, with connections to the Market-Frankford Line elevated train (the "El"), the Broad Street Line, and regional rail lines.

== Infrastructure and government ==
The United States Postal Service operates the Roosevelt Mall branch at 2311 Cottman Avenue. This post office serves the communities in 19152. Residents in the portion of Rhawnhurst in 19111 get mail from the Fox Chase post office, located on 7232 Rising Sun Ave.

== Education ==
There are five primary and secondary schools in Rhawnhurst.

The School District of Philadelphia operates four schools in Rhawnhurst. Farrell Elementary School, a K-8 school, opened in 1959 during the buildup of the Bell's Corner section of Rhawnhurst. Rhawnhurst Elementary School, which serves another section of the area, opened in 1948 during a period of growth in the neighborhood. Castor Gardens Middle School, which predates the neighborhood and though on the south side of Cottman Avenue, is the middle school serving those zoned to Rhawnhurst Elementary. Northeast High School is the zoned high school. The current building is a replacement for the old Northeast High School building at 8th Street and Lehigh Avenue, opened in 1957.

A parochial school, Resurrection of Our Lord Catholic School, opened in 1929 and is operated by the Roman Catholic Archdiocese of Philadelphia.

== Houses of worship ==
Rhawnhurst is home to people of several faiths. Resurrection and BVM are the only Roman Catholic churches in Rhawnhurst. Major Protestant churches include Redemption Lutheran Church (1929), the Rhawnhurst Baptist Church, All Saints Episcopal Church, the Rhawnhurst Presbyterian Church (1929), the Philadelphia First Church of the Nazarene and the Philadelphia Boulevard Seventh-day Adventist Church. There are several synagogues and Jewish congregations in Rhawnhurst including Ahavas Torah, Beth Medrash Harav, B'nai Israel – Ohev Zedek, The Lubavitcher Center, Mesillat Yesharim and Congregation Dibrot Eliyahu.

== Shopping ==
There is very little industry in Rhawnhurst. There is, however, commercial development. Major shopping centers include the Bell's Corner Shopping Center, the Cottman Bustleton Center, and the Roosevelt Mall, which opened in 1964 at Cottman Avenue and the Roosevelt Boulevard. Many smaller storefronts also line Castor Avenue, Bustleton Avenue, and Cottman Avenue.

== Recreation ==
The major recreation attraction in Rhawnhurst is Pennypack Park, one of the largest urban parks in the U.S., and the northern border of the neighborhood. Bradford Park, a smaller park popular as a dog park is located near the Roosevelt Mall. The Pelbano Recreation Center (colloquially called "Solly" because of its location on Solly Avenue), is a playground operated by the City of Philadelphia. Other recreational destinations include the Northeast Regional Library.

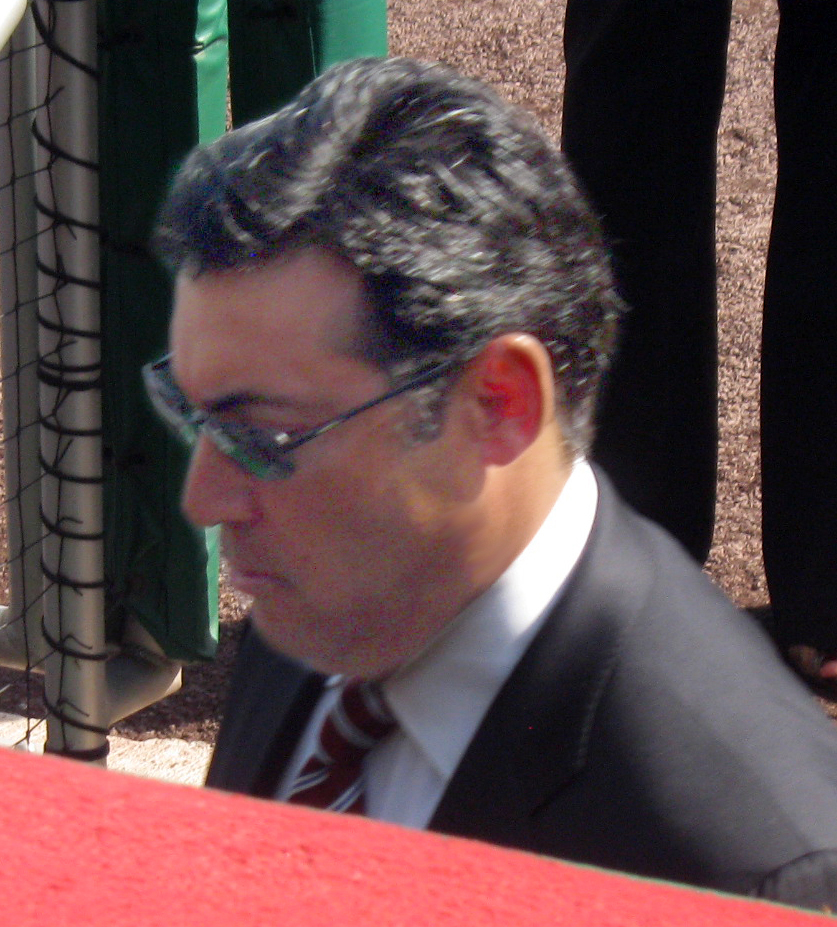
Rubén Amaro, Jr.

== Notable people ==
- Rubén Amaro Jr., MLB baseball player, general manager, and coach
- Ralph Garman, impressionist and radio on-air personality
- Duane Swierczynski, crime writer
- Dennis Duffy, stunt double for Timothée Chalamet
- Howard Eskin, radio and TV sports commentator.
