= KPNE =

KPNE may refer to:

- KPNE-FM, a radio station (91.7 FM) licensed to North Platte, Nebraska, United States
- KPNE-TV, a television station (channel 9) licensed to North Platte, Nebraska, United States
- The ICAO code for Northeast Philadelphia Airport
