= Don Leas =

Head diving coach for Clarion University of Pennsylvania from 1966-1990

Biographical details
- Born: October 23, 1934; Philadelphia, Pennsylvania, U.S.
- Died: April 25, 2019 (aged 84); Clarion, Pennsylvania, U.S.
- Education: Michigan State University; 1957 B.S. Southern Illinois University; 1959 M.S.

Playing career
- 1953-1957: Michigan State University
- Positions: Diver, Gymnast

Coaching career (HC unless noted)
- 1957-1958: Southern Illinois University; Asst. Diving and Gymnastics
- 1959-1961: East Aurora High School; Outside Chicago, Illinois; Swimming, Diving, Cross Country
- 1961-1965: University of Illinois, and Sunset Hills Swimming Club; Gymnastics, Diving, Swimming
- 1966: St. Cloud State University; Head Swimming and Diving Coach
- 1966-1990: Clarion University of Pennsylvania; Head Diving Coach
- 1981: World University Games; Int. Chairman of Diving
- 1996: U.S. Olympic Team; Diving Coordinator

Accomplishments and honors

Championships
- 19 (PSAC) Titles, '71-89 (Clarion University Men); 15 (PSAC) Titles; 8 NCAA Championships (Clarion University Women)

Awards
- 1984 NCAA Diving Coach of the Year; 1980's NCAA Diving Coach of the Decade; 1999 Paragon Award (International Swimming Hall of Fame)

Donald Ericcson Leas was an American gymnast, diver and diving coach who dove for the University of Michigan and coached diving at the Clarion University of Pennsylvania from 1966 to 1990. Divers trained by him won 36 individual national championships and posted 234 All-America placings. He chaired USA Diving, AAU Diving, and the USA Diving Rules Committee. He was selected in 1999 to receive the Paragon Award by the International Swimming Hall of Fame.

Leas was born on October 23, 1934, in Philadelphia, Pennsylvania to Florence Elizabeth (Leaf) Fisher and Robert William Leas. In 1953, he graduated from Northeast High School, the oldest in Philadelphia, where he participated on the diving team from around 1950 to 1953. He helped lead Northeast High to the 1952 Philadelphia City swimming championship, and was a Public League Champion in Low Board diving in January 1953.

Divers trained by him won 36 individual national championships and posted 234 All-America placings. He chaired USA Diving, AAU Diving, and the USA Diving Rules Committee. He was selected in 1999 to receive the Paragon Award by the International Swimming Hall of Fame.

== Michigan State diving, gymnastics team ==
After High School, he dove for Michigan State University under Hall of Fame Swimming and Diving Coach Gus Stager, where he was a Big 10 championship gymnast and diver, graduating in 1957 with a B.S. in Health and Physical Education. Continuing to dive and compete in gymnastics while in graduate school, he was a 1959 Ohio AAU Gymnastics Champion.

== Graduate education and coaching ==
He received his Masters from Southern Illinois University where he graduated in 1959 with a Master of Science Degree in Health and Physical Education, coaching the Southern Illinois University diving team during his studies. From 1961 to 1965, he studied for his Doctorate at the University of Illinois, and worked with the University of Illinois Department of Physical Education, where he served as an Assistant Gymnastics and Diving coach. He also coached swimming and diving at Sunset Hills Country Club in Edwardsville, Illinois during this period. In 1966, he coached swimming and cross country for a year at St. Cloud State University, in St. Cloud, Minnesota.

=== Clarion University ===
He was a diving coach for Clarion University of Pennsylvania from 1966 to 1990. Hired at Clarion by Dr. James Gemmell in May 1966, he served as Chair of the Department of Health and Physical Education. He also served a term as Pennsylvania State Chairman of College Health Education.

The Clarion swim and diving team received some funding for scholarships, but raised a significant percentage of its funds by hosting a swimming and diving camp each summer which enrolled as many as 100 divers. During his twenty-four year coaching tenure, the Clarion men's team won 19 straight Pennsylvania State Athletic Conference titles from 1971 through 1989.

As Clarion women's diving coach in the eleven years between 1977 and 1986, the women's team won 15 Pennsylvania State Athletic Conference titles and eight Division II National Championships. Showing exceptional dominance in their sport, in 1984 Clarion's women's swimming and diving team became the first team in collegiate history to win all 20 events at the NCAA National Championship. Leas was named to the NCAA's "Team of the Decade" coaching staff in 1991 as part of the NCAA's celebration of its 10th year offering women's championships. In his career, his divers won 36 individual national championships and posted 234 All-America placings.

While at Clarion, Leas married Rebecca Rutt, a former swimmer for West Chester College, and the Clarion women's swim coach, from 1979-1987 and a longer serving professor of health education at Clarion.

== Diving administration ==
Leas chaired USA Diving, AAU Diving, and USA Diving's Rules, Certification, and Membership Committees. He became the Diving Coach for the USA Diving Team to the World University Games in 1977, and served as the diving judge for the World University Games in Bucharest, Romania in 1981. He managed Fort Lauderdale's National YMCA Diving Championships and the FINA Grand Prix for several decades.

Leas oversaw numerous events including the Goodwill Games, the US Olympic Festival, and the FINA World Cup. He refereed and advised international events that included coordinating diving at the Olympic Games in 1996 in Atlanta, Georgia. He authored or edited the publication of over 12 diving and diving rules books and developed a computer diving program that managed diving meets and could analyze the performance of diving judges.

Leas retired from coaching diving in 1990, and retired from teaching at Clarion University in 1997 as a professor Emeritus. He was replaced as diving coach by Dave Hrovat, an All American diver from Clemson University who had coached diving the previous two years at Virginia Tech.

=== Death ===
He died on April 25, 2019, at Allegheny General Hospital in Pittsburgh, Pennsylvania of an aortic aneurism at the age of 84. He was married to Carol for over twenty years and had two children.

=== Honors ===
He was named to NCAA's Team of the Decade coaching staff in 1991, and became a member of the Clarion University Sports Hall of Fame in the same year. In 1999, he was the recipient of the Paragon Award by the International Swimming Hall of Fame. He received the Duraflex International Diving Award in 1999, presented for outstanding international contributions in diving. After his retirement from coaching Clarion in 2007, he was presented the Joseph G. Rogers Award for his volunteer work with swimming and diving at the YMCA National Championships.
