= Northeast High School (Philadelphia) =

Coordinates: 40.0556°N 75.0710°W

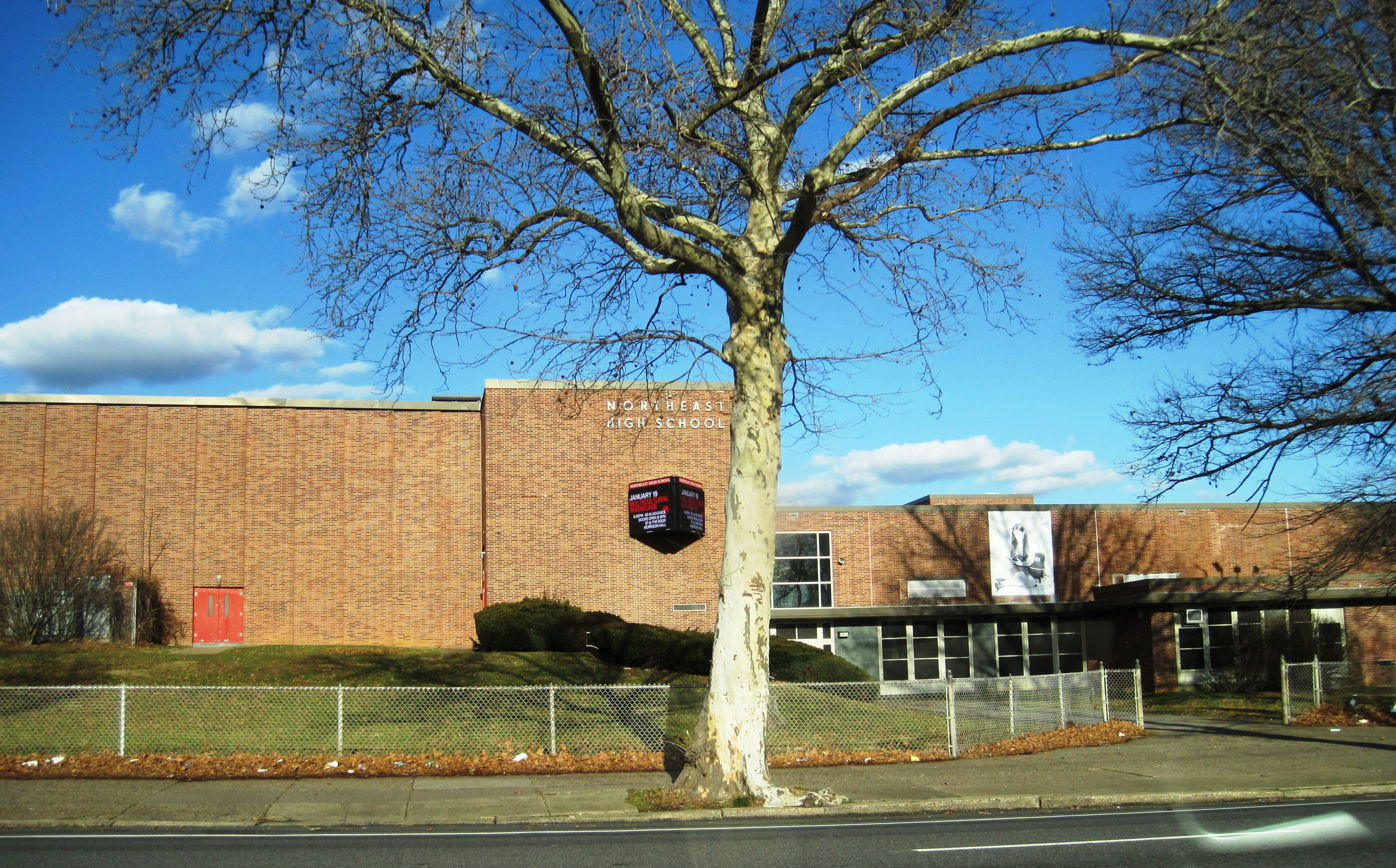
- Entrance along Cottman Avenue

Location
- 1601 Cottman Avenue; Philadelphia, Pennsylvania 19111; United States

Information
- Type: Public high school
- Established: 1890
- School district: School District of Philadelphia
- Principal: Andrew Lukov
- Teaching staff: 185.04 (FTE)
- Grades: 9–12
- Enrollment: 3,541 (2025–2026)
- Student to teacher ratio: 28:1
- Campus type: Urban
- Colors: Black; Red
- Team name: Vikings
- Website: nehs.philasd.org

Northeast High School is a high school located at 1601 Cottman Avenue (at Algon Avenue) in Philadelphia, Pennsylvania.

Northeast is one of the oldest high schools in Philadelphia, founded in 1890 as the Northeast Manual Training School. Before 1957, it was located at 8th Street and Lehigh Avenue in Philadelphia (later the home of Thomas Edison High School). As of June 2026, Northeast High School had 185 graduating classes.

Northeast serves Rhawnhurst and other sections of Northeast Philadelphia. The high school was featured in the A&E series Teach: Tony Danza, where actor Tony Danza taught a tenth grade English class during the 2009–2010 school year. It was also the setting for Frederick Wiseman's 1968 documentary on the school titled, simply, High School.

In 2015, Northeast High School was recognized by U.S. News & World Report Best High Schools and won a bronze medal in recognition of its well rounded students, high standardized test scores, and great overall performance in Advanced Placement, International Baccalaureate, honors, and advanced classes.

== Demographics ==
Northeast High School students comes from very diverse racial, economic, and cultural backgrounds. According to the school profile generated by the School District of Philadelphia the racial makeup of the school based on the 2015–2016 school year is 30.3% African American, 18.5% White, 21.2% Asian, 23.2% Latino, and 6.8% other races. 19.7% of the school students are English Language Learners. 11.2% with disabilities and 3.5% of the students are mentally gifted.

Northeast High School has 3,600 students, making it the most populated high school in the city of Philadelphia. When including the teachers and staff, the school contains more than 3,700 people. Some classes struggle to maintain a maximum of 33 students, as the Philadelphia Federation of Teachers (PFT) contract requires.

As of 2016 the student body speaks about 60 languages; about half of the students were English as a second language learners at some point, and about 20% are enrolled in the school's English for Speakers of Other Languages (ESOL) program.

== Transportation access ==
Northeast High School is accessed by SEPTA bus routes 19, 59, 67, 70, and 77. These routes connect with several other routes in the area such as 1, 14, 18, 19, 20, 24, 58, and SEPTA Regional Rail's Fox Chase Line at Ryers station.

Many students who live out of the immediate area get to school by one of these bus routes from across the city. For those students who live in areas further than a mile away from the school, SEPTA provides them with free weekly bus TransPasses.

== Teams ==
Northeast High School has many sports teams, all of which are known as The Vikings. The school is part of the AAA Public League.

Northeast High School also offers Boys' and Girls' JV and Varsity Tennis, Soccer, Table Tennis, Badminton, Swim, and many other recreational sports.

=== Rivalries ===
Northeast High School and Central High School have the longest running sports rivalry between public high schools in the country, dating back to 1892.

Northeast High School also has a longstanding football rivalry with Abraham Lincoln High School, another public high school in Northeast Philadelphia. The rivalry reportedly dates back to around 1950.

== Programs ==
Northeast High School has many different programs known as Small Learning Communities (SLCs), each of which has a specific career focus. Citywide admissions SLCs include: The Aerospace, Medical and Engineering Magnet Program, the IB Diploma Programme, AVID (Applied Visual and Interactive Design) CTE Program, and Sports Marketing and Management CTE Program. In addition there is an Arts & Education Program, Healthcare and Medical Program and a 9th Grade Academy.

Northeast also boasts an award-winning student newspaper, The Megaphone.

The Northeast High School Instrumental Music is one of the most diverse and sought after music programs in the City of Philadelphia. The Program includes a Marching Band, Jazz Ensemble, Symphony Orchestra, Symphonic Band, and a String Ensemble. In May 2009 the Northeast High School Instrumental program competed and won first place in Orchestra, String Ensemble, and second place Concert Band at Hershey Park, Pennsylvania.

=== Project Space Research Center (SPARC) ===
Northeast High's SPARC program originated in 1962 by Mr. Robert A. G. Montgomery, Jr. Northeast High students united designed and built a three-man space capsule mock-up to test the student astronauts ability to handle the space environment. With the help of a grant from the Southeastern Pennsylvania Heart Association, the program purchased electronic equipment and began to study in flight control instrumentation. Project SPARC was so highly recognized for its work that, during the summer of 1963, NASA invited 18 SPARC students to tour the Marshall Space Flight Center, Manned Spacecraft Center, Cape Canaveral, and the Goddard Space Flight Center.

By the end of 1963, the students had designed a simulated capsule and control area, and construction began on a wing of the stage at the school. The Home and School Association and the Alumni Association made many contributions to aid SPARC. In early May 1964, the first capsule test took place. The chamber was constructed as a closed oxygen-replenishment system. It appears briefly in Frederick Wiseman's documentary High School.

The SPARC Project was updated to pursue the goals of President George W. Bush's Vision for Space Exploration. Project SPARC was realigned to simulate the NASA Constellation program and its mission to return to the Moon. In 2009 Project SPARC flew its first Constellation mission, sending six students to the Moon and establishing a two-module lunar habitat. SPARC facilities include a 21' Shuttle Orbiter mockup built by the students, the actual Apollo training capsule from NASA, an eight station mission control center, a movie and animation learning center and electronics and robotics laboratories. Students can utilize a new facility which incorporates computer and electronic action scripts, video presentations and simulations. Like the SPARC project in the 1960s, they are able to simulate the experience of operating a spaceborne mission. SPARC has attempted several simulations in a few different simulators to the Moon, orbits around the Earth, and to Mars.

In December 2013 the Philadelphia School District, facing difficult budget challenges, cut off funding for all after-school programs including Project SPARC. At the time it appeared the nation's first high school space program would come to end after more than 50 years. Word soon spread about SPARC's cancelation and the alumni responded to help save the program. A GoFundMe site was started and social media was used to engage SPARC alumni and friends. $13,000 was raised within the first month and almost $20,000 altogether. These funds enabled the SPARC students to carry out a May 2014 project to establish a permanent habitat on the Moon. The funding also helped provide some long needed upgrades to SPARC's infrastructure.

This quick response was followed by the formation of the Northeast High School Project SPARC Boosters (http://www.nehssparcboosters.org/) to help ensure SPARC's long-term financial sustainability. SPARC students have embraced their legacy and continue to build on SPARC's history. Two additional missions were conducted during the 2014–15 academic year with a return trip to the Moon in December 2014 and a mission to Mars in April 2015. Project SPARC membership includes more than 130 students classified as full-time members. These students have regular responsibilities in the areas of their specialties and they conduct all of the research and operational activities.

Project SPARC's honorary Flight Director is Philadelphia astronaut Chris Ferguson, who has visited the facility and held video teleconferences with the SPARC students from the Houston Space Center.

== Notable alumni ==
- Herb Adderley, Hall of Fame pro football player
- Walter Bahr, soccer player
- Butch Ballard, jazz drummer
- Michael Bratman, philosopher and professor at Stanford University
- Leonard Burman, American economist and professor at Maxwell School of Citizenship and Public Affairs
- Ann Carr, U.S. Hall of Fame gymnast,
- Tyreek Chappell, football player
- Darrell L. Clarke
- David Cohen (politician)
- Angelo Coia, football player
- Amy Eilberg, rabbi and first female graduate of the Jewish Theological Seminary of America
- Howard Eskin, radio and television personality
- David Gabai, Hughes-Rogers Professor of Mathematics at Princeton University
- Maje McDonnell, coach, scout, and ambassador for Philadelphia Phillies
- Kenneth Frazier, chairman of the board and chief executive officer of Merck & Co., Inc.
- William Goldenberg, film editor, won Academy Award for "Argo."
- Brent Grimes, football player
- Drew Gulak, professional wrestler
- Sonny Hill, organizer of Philadelphia summer basketball leagues
- Donald C. Leas, Hall of Fame diving coach for Clarion University of Pennsylvania from 1966—1990
- Jesse Levis, baseball player scout
- Brett Mandel, author
- David Mirkin, director, writer, producer
- Len Oliver (soccer), soccer player
- Diane Renay, pop singer
- Guy Rodgers, Hall of Fame basketball player
- Frank A. Salvatore, Pennsylvania State Representative for the 170th district from 1975 to 1984; Pennsylvania State Senator for the 5th district from 1985 to 2000
- Steven Smith (basketball), basketball player
- Joel Spector, theatrical and television producer
- Eddie Stanky, baseball player and manager
- Lil Uzi Vert, hip-hop artist
- Brendon Walsh, comedian
- Charles Way, football player
- Briana Williams, athletics
