= Dave Hrovat =

Head diving coach for Clarion University of Pennsylvania from 1990-2021

Biographical details
- Born: circa 1967; Mentor, Ohio
- Education: Clemson University 1988; B.S. Industrial Education

Playing career
- 1984-1988: Clemson University
- Positions: Diver; 1 and 3-meter boards

Coaching career (HC unless noted)
- 1988-1990: Virginia Tech; Head Diving Coach
- 1990-2021: Clarion University of Pennsylvania; Head Diving Coach

Accomplishments and honors

Championships
- 1990-2021 48 Individual NCAA National Titles (Clarion University)

Awards
- 15 x CSCAA NCAA Women's Diving Coach of the Year; 11 x CSCAA Men's Diving Coach of the Year

Dave Hrovat was a competitive diver and coach who dove for Clemson University and coached diving at the Clarion University of Pennsylvania from 1990 to 2021, where he led his teams to 48 individual championship titles and 294 All-American finishes.

Hrovat began competitive diving by the age of 7, and within two years was attending meets at the national level. A native of Mentor, Ohio, he attended Mentor High School. While competing for the University Diving Club in 1978, in Galion, Ohio, two hours southwest of Mentor, he set a record for most points scored on the one-meter board in a diving meet at the Lion's Club Diving Invitational Tournament for boys in age group 11-12. In Mid-August 1980, around the age of 13, Hrovat competed in the diving competition at the National AAU/Jr. Olympic Games in Santa Clara California, representing Mentor-on-the-Lake.

After a move to Bridgeville, Pa., he enrolled at Chartiers Valley High School beginning in his Sophomore year. An outstanding diver for Chartiers Valley, in his Senior Year in 1984, he won diving titles with the Western Pennsylvania Interscholastic Athletic League (WPIAL) and the Pennsylvania Interscholastic Athletic Association and was a High School All American diver. He was rated as a top diver in the WPIAL in his Senior year at Chartiers Valley prior to the WPIAL Championship in February 1984. At the Pennsylvania Boy's State Swimming Championship in March 1984, Hrovat, swimming as a Senior for Chartier Valley, won the diving competition.

== Diving for Clemson ==
He earned varsity letters in diving all four years while attending Clemson University, and was an Atlantic Coast Conference Champion on both the 1 and 3-meter boards. As early as his Freshman year at Clemson in February 1985, Hrovat took a first place in the 3-meter diving event in a meet against North Carolina State. In a more exclusive honor, he was an Atlantic Coast Conference Diver of the Year in 1988. At the February 1988 Atlantic Coast Conference Championship in Raleigh, North Carolina, while diving for Clemson, Hrovat won the 1-meter dive competition, a signature event. Hrovat earned NCAA All American status in April 1987 with a 14th place in the 1 Meter diving event at the National NCAA championship in Austin, Texas. He graduated Clemson in 1988 with a B.S. in Industrial Education, while earning a 3.4 grade point average in his major.

== Coaching diving ==
Hrovat began his dive coaching career at Virginia Tech, where he served as head diving coach from 1988 through 1990.

Hrovat would coach diving at Clarion University of Pennsylvania from 1990 through 2021. He replaced 's Hall of Fame Diving Coach Don Leas, who became Clarion's first diving coach in 1966, and had an outstanding record leading Clarion's mens team to 19 Conference titles, and the women's team to 15 conference titles as well as eight NCAA Division II Championships. As an equally accomplished successor to Leas, in his thirty-year tenure coaching diving at Clarion University, his divers won a combined 48 individual national NCAA Division II titles and were the recipients of 294 All-American honors. His divers on Clarion's women's team won 27 individual national championship titles from 1990 to 2020. Hrovat's men's team divers won 21 national individual championship titles out of a possible 60 titles, making a male diver from Clarion a winner in a national championship on average every other year. In 26 of the 30 years his divers competed at the NCAA Division II National Championships, they won at least one individual national title.

In a significant year coaching diving at Clarion, in 2014 Hrovat's divers captured all four NCAA individual diving championship titles in NCAA National competition.

=== Outstanding divers coached at Clarion ===
Perhaps his highest scoring diver on the women's team was Jamie Wolf Jackel, who, between 2004 and 2007, captured seven NCAA Division II National Championships and received the honor of being name a Female Diver of the Year by the Division II NCAA in three years. Wolf was also named as a finalist for NCAA Woman of the Year, and as an outstanding student at Clarion, would later earn a PHd in Molecular Genetics.

Hrovat's other outstanding divers who were Clarion Hall of Fame inductees included Ken Bedford, inducted in 2012, Kayla Kelosky Renninger, inducted in 2017, Logan Pearsall, inducted in 2019, and Stephanie Sutton, inducted in 2021. Kristin Day Shute, a national champion in three years, received the first NCAA Woman of the Year award in 2015 from a Pennsylvania school, and only the fourth from an NCAA Division II school. She would later pursue a career in medicine. Other outstanding divers included four-time national champion Collin Vest a two-time NCAA Men's Diver of the Year, who would serve as a swimming and diving coach at Westminster College. Hrovat also coached outstanding male diver Shawn Colton, who was a four-time NCAA national champion title holder. He coached national champion and NCAA Women's Diver of the Year Christina Sather, who coached diving at Lehigh University in the 2019–20 season while obtaining her Masters at the University.

=== Honors ===
Hrovat was named NCAA Division II Women's Diving Coach of the Year, a total of 15 times between 1991 through 2019 and NCAA Division II Men's Diving Coach of the Year 11 times from 1991 to 2015. He was named to the Western Chapter of the Pennsylvania Sports Hall of Fame in May 2022. In March 2021, he had the somewhat exclusive distinction of being named one of the College Swimming Coaches' Association of America's (CSCAA) 100 Greatest Coaches of the Century.

Hrovat and his wife Kim resided in Clarion County's Knox, Pennsylvania in 2020. They had a daughter and son and two grandchildren.
