= Learjet 60 =

Business jet aircraft

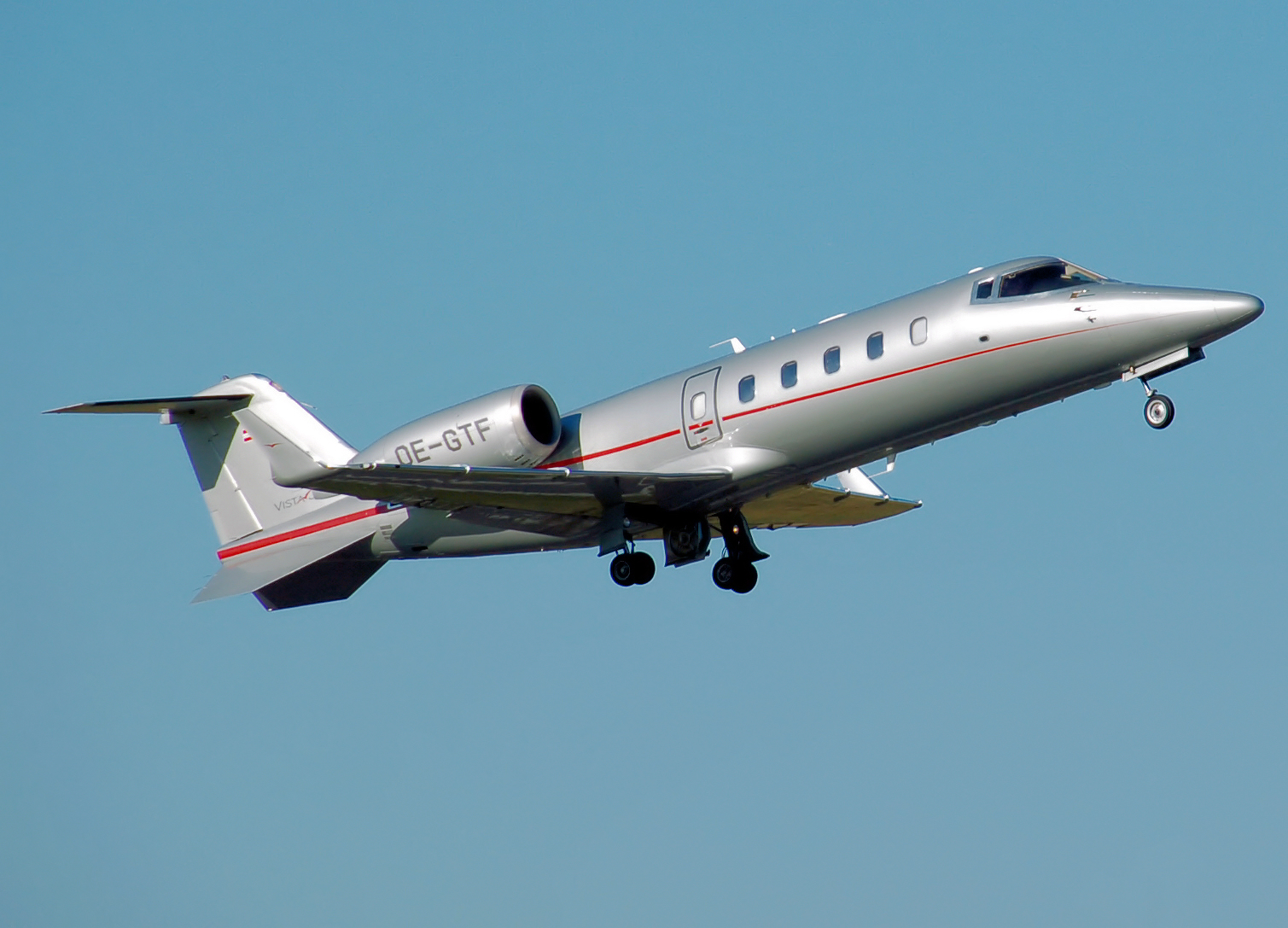
- The Learjet 60 has twin turbofans mounted on the fuselage ahead of its T-tail

General information
- Type: Business jet
- Manufacturer: Bombardier Aerospace
- Status: In service
- Number built: 429

History
- Manufactured: 1991–2012
- Introduction date: January 1993
- First flight: 10 October 1990
- Developed from: Learjet 55

The Learjet 60 is a mid-size cabin, medium-range business jet aircraft that was manufactured by Bombardier Aerospace in Wichita, Kansas, United States. Powered by two Pratt & Whitney Canada PW305A engines, it has a range (with 4 passengers and 2 crew) of 2,405 nautical miles (4,454 km) with NBAA 100 nmi (190 km) reserves, ISA. In July 2012, Bombardier Aerospace announced a temporary "production pause" of the latest variant Learjet 60XR to begin in the fourth quarter of 2012.

== Development ==
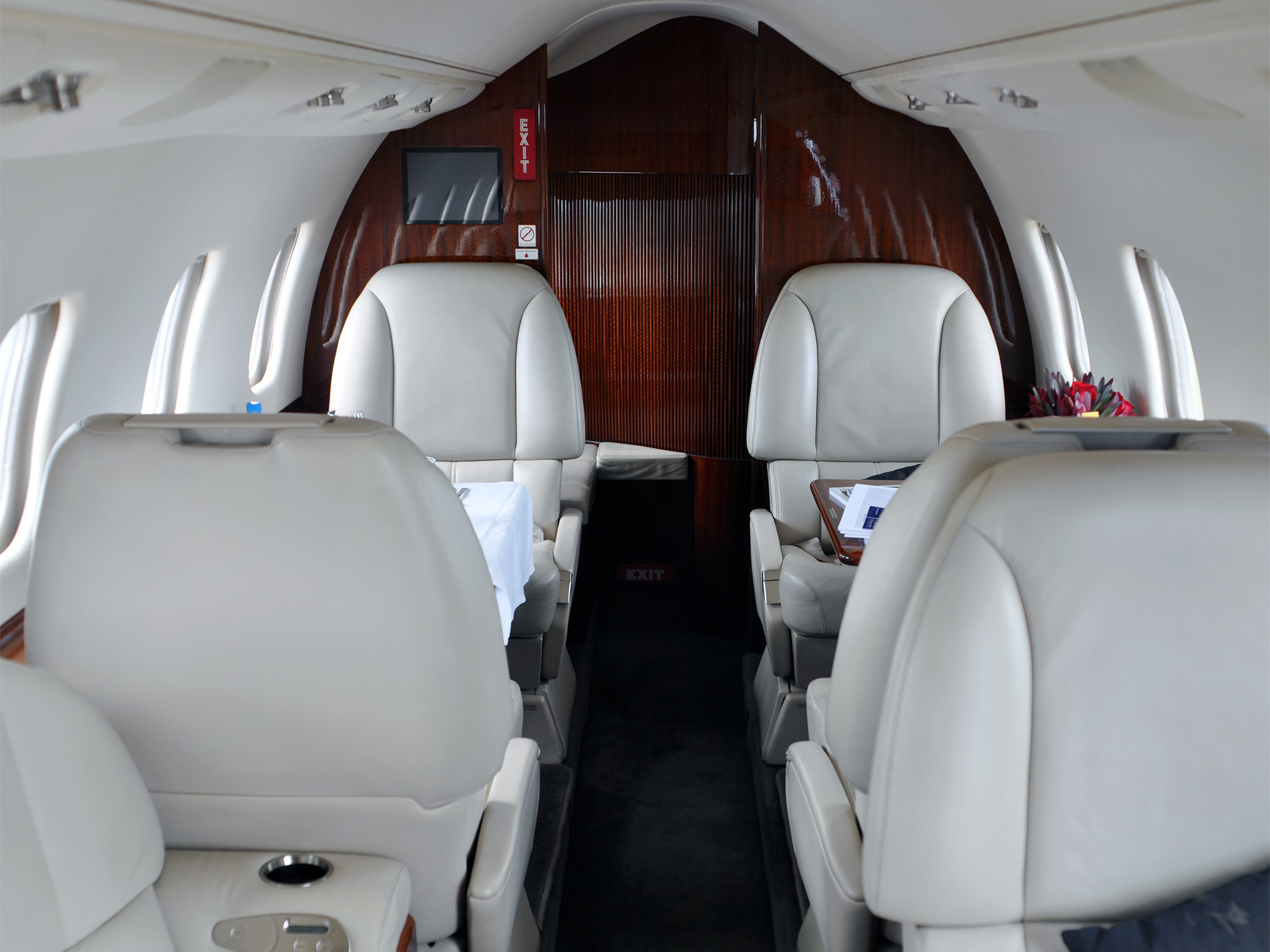
Executive cabin

The Learjet 60 is an improved version of the Learjet 55, with a longer fuselage and more powerful turbofan engines. It first flew on 10 October 1990 and received FAA certification in January 1993.

The modifications that converted the Learjet Model 55 into a Model 60 resulted from aerodynamic improvements and a need to increase the capacity of the Learjet product line. Several of these modifications were a first for Learjet, including an all-new inboard wing cuff on the inboard sections of the “Longhorn” wing and an all-new wing-to-body fairing. By increasing the wing chord and the leading edge droop, the wing cuff improved handling during approach and landing, while the wing-to-body fairing reduced the interference drag between the wing and the fuselage. Because the engines were new for this aircraft, a new engine pylon had to be designed.

The lines of the cockpit have not changed but the fuselage was lengthened. In addition, the blend between the fuselage and the empennage was new. While it appears as if area ruling was the intention of the blending, the blend design was really driven by attaching the original Learjet Model 35 empennage onto the larger Learjet Model 60 fuselage.

The final aerodynamic improvements to the Model 60 included the creation of the distinctive "ogive" winglet trailing edge. This lengthening of the chord near the interface of the winglet and the wing improved the interaction of the wing's pressure spike with the winglet's pressure spike. The result was a significant lowering of the drag and a significant improvement in the wing's efficiency. On the prior "Longhorn" wing, the interference between the winglet and the wing nearly canceled the effects of the winglet. The single ventral fin was also replaced with two ventral fins that Learjet called "Delta Fins" to improve stall characteristics and promote aerodynamic stability.

The Learjet 60 has a high thrust-to-weight ratio and climbs to 41,000 feet (12,000 m) in 18.5 minutes at maximum weight. It is the last legacy Learjet, using a variation of the wing that designer Bill Lear adapted from the Swiss military aircraft, the FFA P-16. The next-generation Learjet was to be the Learjet 85 and was an all-new design by Bombardier Aerospace slated for delivery in 2013. (Bombardier cancelled the project after spending over $1 billion on it.)

Despite its performance advantages, the Learjet 60 has the highest incident/accident rate in its class, with most accidents occurring during landing. The use of the original Lear 23 gear and wheels (albeit with an added brake rotor, bringing the total to 3 per wheel assembly) left the 60 (and the 55 before it) under-geared and under-braked. According to Business Jet Traveler, citing the NTSB, most of these failures are caused by pilot-error as the aircraft can be unforgiving.

Production of the Learjet 60 ended in 2007 after 318 aircraft had been built. The Learjet 60XR was a variation with upgraded Proline 21 avionics and slight improvements to the cabin, with production beginning at serial number 319.

By 2018, a Learjet 60 could be purchased for $1 million or less.

== Learjet 60XR ==
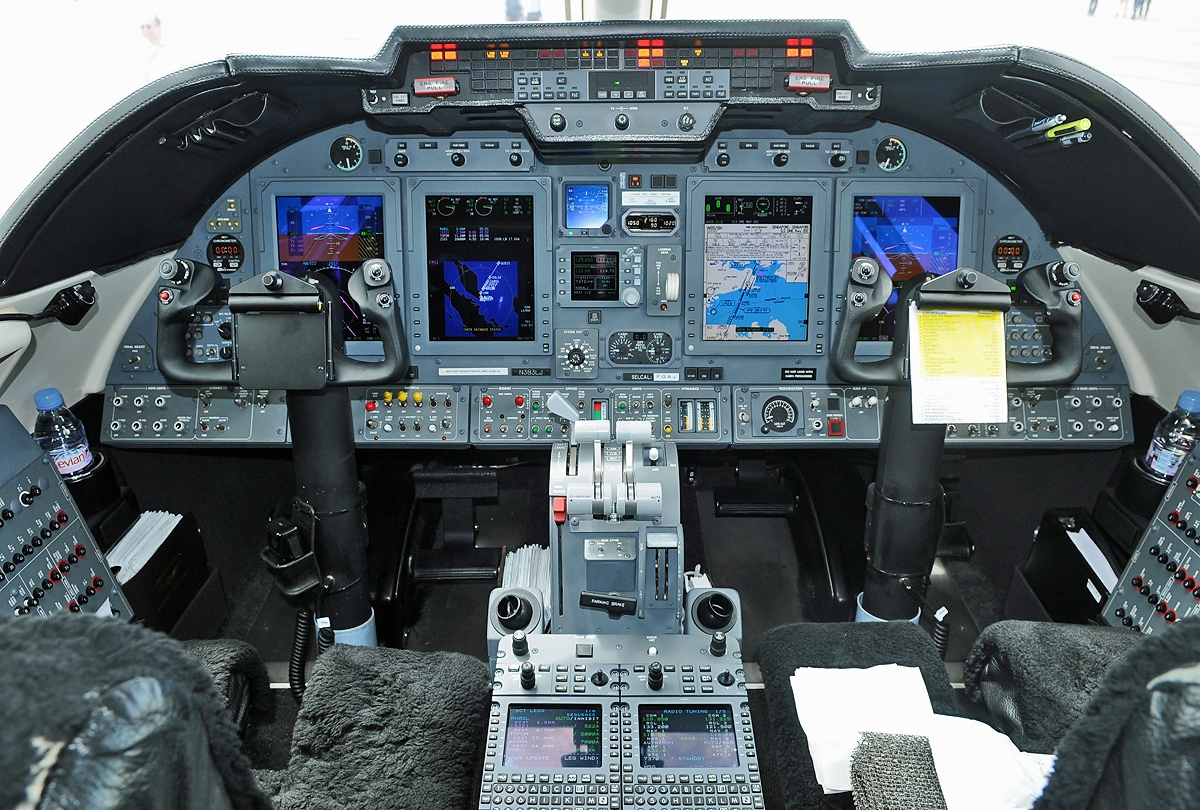
Learjet 60XR cockpit

Bombardier launched a new variant in 2005 designated the Learjet 60XR following certification deliveries started in 2007.

Grandfathered on the 1966 Learjet 24 type certificate, it was built until 2013. It features three-rotor disc brakes per wheel, good for 450–600 landings, Rockwell Collins Pro Line 21 avionics, upgraded AHRS and FMS, electronic charts, enhanced MFD and optional XM radio weather. Cabin space is better utilized with five floor plans, LED lighting, better insulation and improved cabin management system. The 60XR has the largest Learjet cabin, its cross-section is competitive but its length is 2 to 5 ft (60 to 150 cm) shorter than other mid-size jets like the Hawker 800XP. The small 265 sq ft (24.6 m^{2}) wing evolved from the Learjet 23, with the tip tanks replaced by winglets, runway requirements are long for the 23,500 lb (10,700 kg) aircraft.

A typically equipped 60XR weighs 940 lb (430 kg) more than the original Model 60, tanks-full payload is 600 lb (270 kg) and four-passenger range is 2,240 nmi (4,150 km). It climbs to FL 410 in 18 min and cruises at 440 kn (810 km/h) TAS with an average fuel burn of 1,300 lb (600 kg)/h. Long-range cruise varies from 387 to 420 kn (717 to 778 km/h) TAS at FL 350–430 and ISA conditions, while normal cruise speed is Mach 0.76 436 kn (807 km/h) TAS. The FADEC-controlled 4,600 lbf (20 kN) PW305A turbofans have a 6,000 hour TBO, reserves amount to $360 per hour per engine. In September 2018, there were 112 Model 60XRs in service, priced between $2.5 million for a 2007 model to $4.0 million for a 2013 one.

== Operators ==
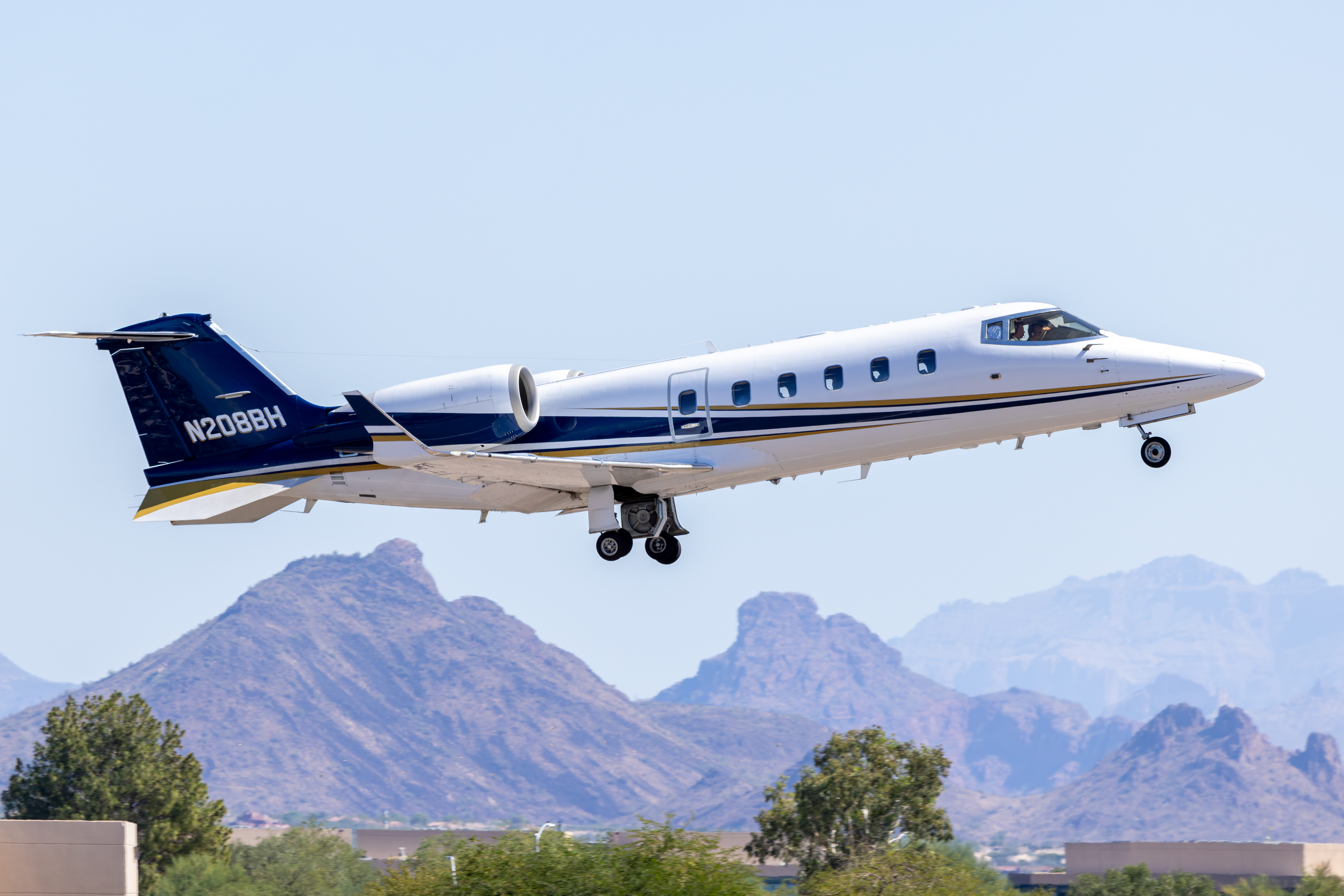
Learjet 60 N208BH departing Scottsdale Airport, Arizona, 2023

=== Civilian ===
The Learjet 60 is used by private operators, companies and fractional jet operators.

=== Military and government ===
Argentina
One Learjet 60XR used by Tucumán Government.
One Learjet 60 used by the "Jefatura Del Estado Mayor"

Colombia
Colombian Air Force: One Learjet 60 used for VIP transport by Grupo Aereo de Vuelos especiales 82.

North Macedonia
One Learjet 60 delivered in April 2005 to replace the lost King Air 200. Used by the Government for VIP transport.

Malaysia
Two operated by the Civil Aviation Authority of Malaysia (CAAM) Flight Calibration Division used for calibrated aerodrome equipment.

Mexico
One Learjet 60 delivered for the Mexican Navy.

Moldova
One operated by Nobil Air, used for civilian and governmental VIP transport.

Malta
Used governmental transport.

Sweden
Three Learjet 60 delivered to Swedish Defence Materiel Administration, used as target tug for test and evaluation.

United States
Six Learjet 60 aircraft are operated by the Federal Aviation Administration to carry out airborne accuracy checks of navigational facilities.

== Incidents and accidents ==
- On September 19, 2008, a Learjet 60, N999LJ crashed while taking off from Columbia Metropolitan Airport in South Carolina. Performers Travis Barker and DJ AM were injured, while both crew members and two other passengers were killed in the crash. NTSB identified "greatly underinflated tires" and "rejected takeoff after V1" as probable causes for the crash; it was exacerbated by a tire breaking a microswitch which caused reverse thrust to become a forward thrust. After the post-accident investigation, the Federal Aviation Administration issued new directives for operators of the Learjet 60 and 60XR aircraft to check tire pressures every four days.
- On November 1, 2026, a Learjet 60, N722BD crashed into the roadside next to a mobile home park in Greenacres, Florida. The aircraft exploded on impact and a fire erupted. All nine people on board were killed, and one person on the ground sustained an injury. The aircraft departed Austin-Bergstrom International Airport (AUS), Texas, at 9:37 a.m. CST (15:37 UTC), heading towards its destination at North Eleuthera (MYEH), Bahamas. After passing Naples, Florida, at 41,000 feet (12,500 m), the jet descended to 35,000 feet (10,700 m) and turned left, heading north-east. At 12:48 p.m. EST (17:48 UTC), the aircraft began to head east and briefly climbed to 35,400 feet (10,800 m) following a request to climb to 37,000 feet (11,300 m). The aircraft then made a descending right-hand turn at an increasing rate of descent of over 30,000 feet (9000 m) per minute. The jet hit South Military Trail, a major six-lane roadway, at 12:49 p.m. EST (17:49 UTC). A severe weather Convective SIGMET was active for the accident area. Fragments of the left elevator were recovered at distances ranging from 1.3 miles to 3.8 miles from the primary impact crater. An NTSB investigation is ongoing.

== Specifications ==
Data from Brassey's World Aircraft & Systems Directory 1999/2000.

General characteristics

- Crew: 2
- Capacity: 8 passengers
- Length: 58 ft 8 in (17.88 m)
- Wingspan: 43 ft 9 in (13.34 m)
- Height: 14 ft 8 in (4.47 m)
- Wing area: 264.5 sq ft (24.57 m^{2})
- Empty weight: 14,640 lb (6,641 kg)
- Max takeoff weight: 23,500 lb (10,659 kg)
- Powerplant: 2 × Pratt & Whitney Canada PW305A turbofan engines, 4,600 lbf (20 kN) thrust each

Performance

- Cruise speed: 484 mph (779 km/h, 421 kn) economical cruise

522 mph (840 km/h; 454 kn) fast cruise
536 mph (863 km/h; 466 kn) max cruise

- Range: 2,773 mi (4,463 km, 2,410 nmi)
- Service ceiling: 51,000 ft (16,000 m)
- Rate of climb: 4,500 ft/min (23 m/s)

== See also ==
Aircraft of comparable role, configuration, and era

- Cessna Citation VII
- Gulfstream G150
- Hawker 800XP
