= Learjet 55 =

1979 executive business jet aircraft

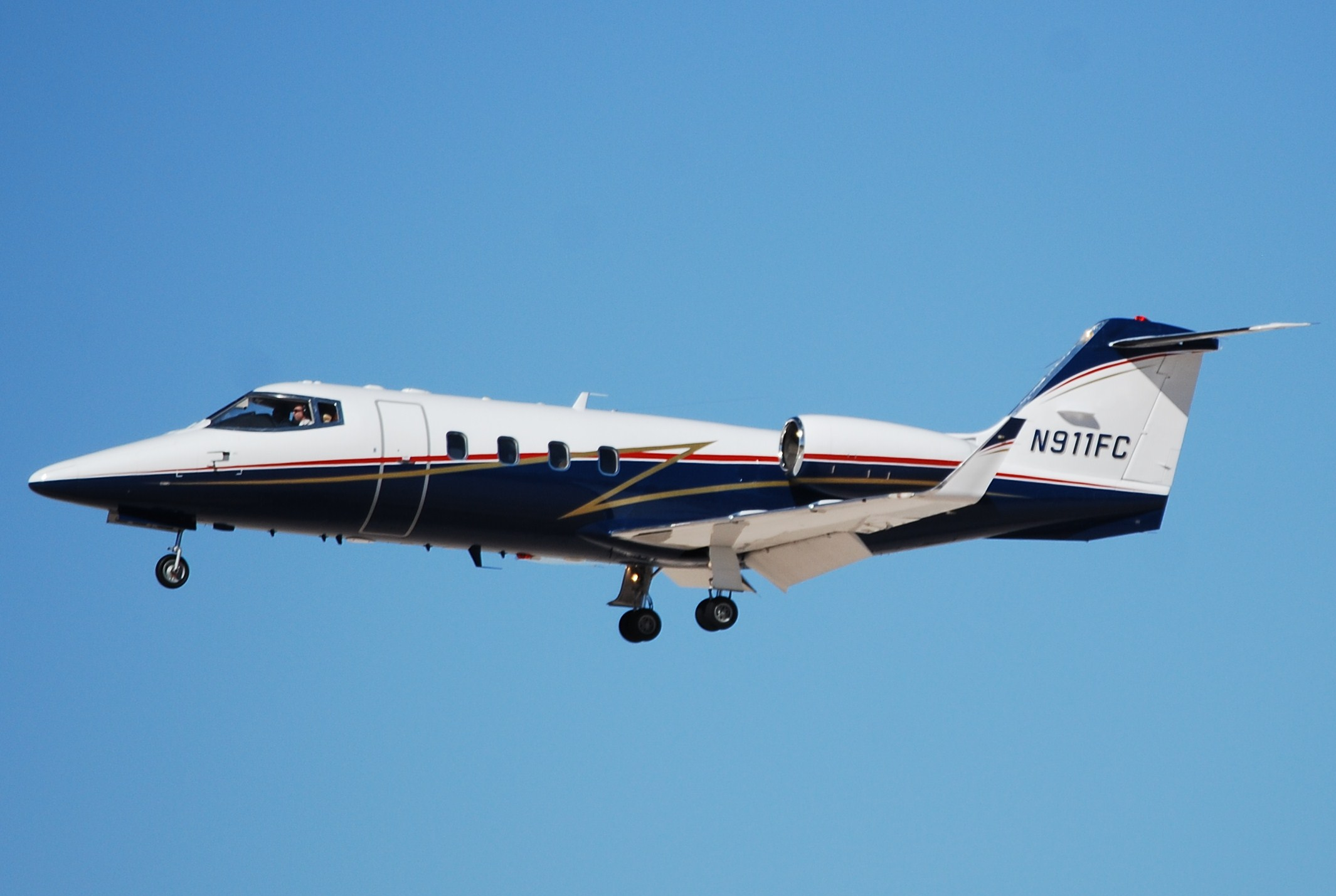
- A Learjet 55 on final approach

General information
- Type: Business jet
- National origin: United States
- Manufacturer: Learjet
- Status: In service
- Number built: 147

History
- Manufactured: 1979–1987
- Introduction date: 1981
- First flight: 19 April 1979
- Developed into: Learjet 60

The Learjet 55 "Longhorn" is an American business jet manufactured by Learjet.

== Development and design ==
The Learjet 50 series was first announced at the 1977 Paris Air Show with larger cabins than existing Learjets. The series was to have three variants, the Learjet 54, 55 and 56 but only the Learjet 55 was built. The Learjet 55 was a low-wing cantilever monoplane with NASA-developed winglets. The aircraft has a T-tail and is powered by two Garrett TFE731 turbofans mounted each side of the rear fuselage. It has a retractable tricycle landing gear and an enclosed cabin for up to ten passengers and a cockpit for the two crew. Construction of the Learjet 55 began in April 1978 after extensive testing and work on the wing design which came, initially, from the Learjet 25. The Learjet 55 first flew on 19 April 1979. The first production aircraft were produced starting 18 March 1981. In total, 147 Learjet 55 aircraft were delivered.

== Variants ==
Learjet 54
Proposed 11-seat variant; not built.
Learjet 55
Production variant; 126 built.
Learjet 55B
1986 - Improved version with a glass cockpit, improved take-off performance and increased range, 8 built.
Learjet 55C
1987 - New rear underfuselage design, with Delta Fins to improve lateral Dutch roll stability, and reduce takeoff and landing speeds.
Learjet 55C/ER
Extended-range version of the Learjet 55C.
Learjet 55C/LR
Long-range version of the Learjet 55C, fitted with an extra tank, carrying an extra 259 lb (117 kg) of fuel in the tail cone.
Learjet 56
Proposed eight-seat version, not built.
VU-55
Brazilian Air Force designation for a VIP transport variant of the Learjet 55.

== Operators ==
Dominican Republic

- Servicios Aéreos Profesionales

== Accidents and incidents ==
- On June 23, 2000, a Universal Jet Aviation Learjet 55 on a Visual flight rules (VFR) climb from BCT collided at an altitude of 2,400 feet 2.8 miles SW of Boca Raton with an Extra EA-300S which took off from Pompano Beach Airpark. Both aircraft crashed to the ground. All 3 occupants (2 crew, 1 passenger) on the Learjet 55 were killed along with the sole occupant of the Extra EA-300S.
- On 12 August 2010, a Learjet 55 suffered an electrical failure in route to the Santos Dumont airport, and after landing, had trouble braking, and overshot the runway into the bay. None of the three occupants had major injuries.
- On 31 January 2025, Med Jets Flight 056, a Mexican-registered Learjet 55 operating as a air ambulance by a Miami/Mexico based Jet Rescue Air Ambulance with six people on board crashed near Roosevelt Mall in Philadelphia, at the intersection of Bustleton and Cottman Avenues, 40 seconds after takeoff from the Northeast Philadelphia Airport at 6:06 p.m. EST. The pediatric patient and her mother were en route to Tijuana International Airport in Mexico via Springfield-Branson National Airport, northwest of Springfield in Greene County, Missouri, after a medical procedure in Philadelphia Shriners Hospital. All 6 occupants onboard the aircraft and 2 people on the ground were killed in the crash.
- On September 24, 2025, a Learjet 55, registration YV-3440, crashed during take-off at Caracas, injuring at least two passengers.

== Specifications ==
Data from Illustrated Encyclopedia of Aircraft

General characteristics

- Crew: 2
- Capacity: 10
- Length: 55 ft 1 in (16.80 m)
- Wingspan: 43 ft 10 in (13.35 m)
- Height: 14 ft 8 in (4.48 m)
- Wing area: 264.5 sq ft (24.57 m^{2})
- Empty weight: 13,000 lb (5,897 kg)
- Max takeoff weight: 21,500 lb (9,752 kg)
- Powerplant: 2 × Garrett TFE731-3A-2B turbofan aero-engine, 3,700 lbf (16 kN) thrust each

Performance

- Maximum speed: 541 mph (871 km/h, 470 kn) at 30,000 ft (9,145 m)
- Cruise speed: 462 mph (744 km/h, 402 kn) at 49,000 ft (14,935 m)
- Range: 2,492 mi (4,010 km, 2,165 nmi) with four passengers and fuel reserves
- Service ceiling: 51,000 ft (15,544 m)
