= Rebecca Leas =

American swimming coach (born 1951)

Rebecca Rutt Leas
- Rutt in swim gear in 1971 as College Sophomore at West Chester

Biographical details
- Born: April 23, 1951 (age 75); Ephrata, Pennsylvania, U.S.
- Education: West Chester University

Playing career
- 1969-1973: West Chester University
- Positions: Breaststroke, Backstroke, Individual Medley

Coaching career (HC unless noted)
- 1979-1987: Clarion University; Women's Swimming; Don Lease, spouse
- 1979-1981: Clarion Women's Tennis

Head coaching record
- Overall: 71-14 Win % 83.5 (Clarion University)

Accomplishments and honors

Championships
- 6x NCAA Div. II National Titles (Clarion); 1980-87 PSAC Conf. Champs (Clarion)

Awards
- Clarion University Hall of Fame (1996); West Chester University Hall of Fame (1995); NCAA Div. II Coach of the Year; NCAA Div. II All Decade Team

Rebecca Christine Rutt (April 23, 1951– ), later known by her married name Rebecca Rutt Leas, was a competitive swimmer for West Chester University and the women's swim coach for Clarion University from 1979 to 1987 where her teams won six National Team Titles in NCAA Division II Championships. She is the only woman to have won a national championship as a collegiate swimmer and to have coached six national championship teams.

Rebecca Rutt was born in Ephrata, Pennsylvania on April 23, 1951, to Mr. and Mrs. Harold L. Rutt. She attended Ephrata High School, graduating with a class of 218 on June 3, 1969, while making the school's honor roll. Beginning to compete around the age of seven, she trained with and competed for the Lancaster Aquatic Club under Head Coach Gary Eby at least by the age of 10. By 1961, the accomplished club had 90 members on the women's team and competed in the Women's Swim League of Philadelphia. At 12 in December, 1963, she set Lancaster Aquatic Club records of 1:03.5 in the 100-yard freestyle, and of 2:38.4 in the 200-yard Individual Medley, and swam the 50-yard free in a non-record time of 35.9. By her High School Freshman year in 1966, she held five Lancaster club records and had been voted the "Most Valuable Swimmer" on the team for two consecutive years.

== West Chester State College ==
Receiving a scholarship, she swam for West Chester University, then known as West Chester State College, making the Dean's list in the Fall of 1969 and 1971, and graduating with honors in July, 1973. The West Chester Golden Ramettes women's team won the Regional Eastern Intercollegiate Swimming and Diving Championships in 1971 with a margin of over 100 points at Southern Connecticut State. That year, in a season when the West Chester women had been undefeated in two years of dual meets, Becky placed ninth in the 100-yard breaststroke, ninth in the Individual Medley, and tenth in the 100-yard backstroke at the National Collegiate Swimming Championships at Arizona State, with the West Chester women having placed second in the previous National meet in 1970. Swimming for West Chester, she was part of the school's historic National Championship team in 1972.

== Coaching ==
After graduating with honors from West Chester State in May, 1973, where she completed a Bachelor's and then a Master's in Health Education, she taught for six years at Conestoga High School, from 1973 to 1979.

=== Clarion University ===
Rutt was appointed an assistant professor at Clarion University in August 1979, responsible for coaching the Women's Swim and Tennis teams, and serving as a Health Instructor. During her time coaching the women's swim team at Clarion she had an overall record of 71–14 in dual meets with most of her losses occurring against NCAA Division I swim teams. Leas resigned as the women's swimming Coach at the age of 35 for health reasons in late April, 1987, but remained at Clarion as an Associate and then full Professor in Heath Education. She mentioned nodules on her vocal cords as an issue, a condition that the work of a swim coach would aggravate. During her coaching tenure at Clarion from 1979 to 1987, she led the women's swim team to six Division II national team titles in every year from 1980 to 1984 and again in 1986. Her squads won every Pennsylvania State Athletic Conference (PSAC) dual meet and each PSAC Conference championship from 1980 to 1987, running eight consecutive years. Clarion was at the Division 1 national championships from 1982 to 1986 and attended the U.S. Olympic Trials in 1984. In 1987, Leas coached All American Christine Jenson during her Freshman year and coached Jeanne O'Connor, a Clarion standout in the 100-meter sprint from 1980 to 1984.

As a United States Masters Swimmer in September 1981, Rutt won the National age group title in the 50 and 100 backstroke events. She placed fourth in the 50 breaststroke and sixth in both the 100 and 200 breaststroke.

Leas studied for her Doctorate in Sport Pedagogy at the University of Pittsburgh beginning in August 1987, and completed the degree in 1992. She served on the Olympic International Committee for U.S. Swimming and was instrumental in the selection of the coaching staff for the 1984 Olympics.

Rebecca married Philadelphia native Don Leas, a former diver for Michigan State, and the diving coach at Clarion from 1966 to 1990.

=== Honors ===
Lease was inducted into the Clarion University Hall of Fame in 1996, and her alma mater's West Chester University's Hall of Fame the prior year in 1995. She was a Division II Coach of the year in 1980, 1981, and 1984. In 1991, she was elected to NCAA Division II's All-Decade team coaching staff, along with her husband Don who coached Clarion Diving for 24 years. She received a Lifetime Achievement Award from the Greater Pittsburgh Chamber of Commerce in 1990. In her honor, she and Milissa Steiner Bauer, a Clarion University swimmer and graduate, created the Dr. Rebecca Rutt Leas Women's Swimming Scholarship at Clarion in January, 2007. As a distinctive honor, in 2022 Becky Leas and her dive coach husband Don were voted to the College Swimming Coaches Association of America (CSCAA) 100 Greatest Swimming & Diving Coaches list.
