= Castor Gardens Middle School =

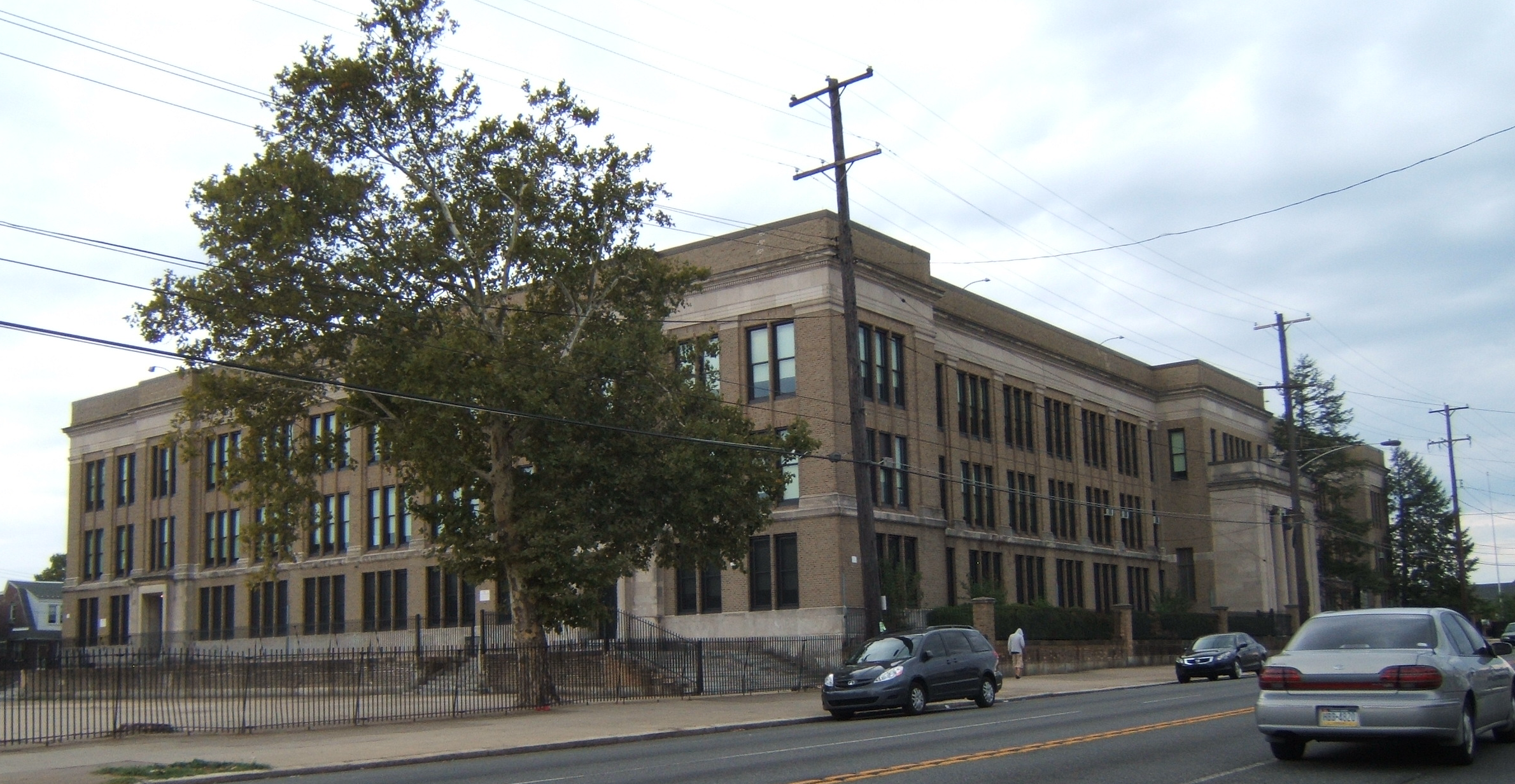
- School Building, September 2010

Location
- 1800 Cottman Avenue; Philadelphia, Pennsylvania 19111; United States

Information
- Type: Public Middle School
- Established: 1927; 99 years ago
- School district: School District of Philadelphia
- Principal: Shawn McGuigan
- Grades: 6-8
- Enrollment: 1,400
- Color
- Website: castorgardens.philasd.org
- Castor Gardens Middle School
- U.S. National Register of Historic Places
- Location within Philadelphia Location within Pennsylvania Location within the United States
- Location: 1800 Cottman Avenue, Philadelphia, Pennsylvania, U.S.
- Coordinates: 40.0525°N 75.0690°W
- Area: 2 acres (0.81 ha)
- Built: 1927-1928
- Architect: Irwin T. Catharine
- Architectural style: Classical Revival
- MPS: Philadelphia Public Schools TR
- NRHP reference No.: 86003347
- Added to NRHP: December 4, 1986

Castor Gardens Middle School, previously known as Woodrow Wilson Middle School, is a historic, American middle school located in the Castor Gardens neighborhood of Philadelphia, Pennsylvania. It is a part of the School District of Philadelphia.

Castor Gardens Middle School has been a certified International Baccalaureate School since 2012, and also offers algebra 1.

== History and notable features ==
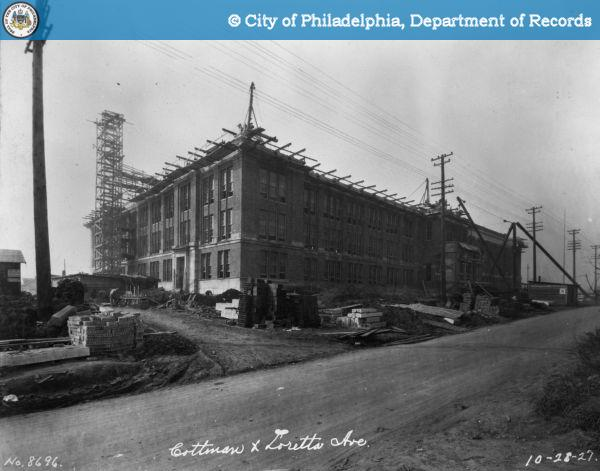
Castor Gardens Middle School, which was called Woodrow Wilson Junior High until 2022, in construction during 1927.

The school was designed by architect Irwin T. Catharine, who was also architected other buildings within the Philadelphia area. It is a three-story, fifteen-bay, brick and limestone building created in the Classical Revival style. It features a projecting center entrance pavilion, four Doric order columns supporting an entablature, and a balustraded parapet.

The school's namesake was the 28th President of the United States, Woodrow Wilson, but in 2022, the School District of Philadelphia renamed the school to Castor Gardens Middle School, reflecting the neighborhood it resides in, due to increasing incidents of related Black Lives Matter protests after the murder of George Floyd, which rendered the school a potential target of violence from the protesters due to the racial views of its namesake, Woodrow Wilson.

The historic school building was added to the National Register of Historic Places in 1986.

=== Present day ===
On November 14, 2017, the school was placed on lockdown at 1:45 p.m. due to reports of a gun in the school. Police surrounded the school and investigated every classroom in search for the reported firearm and later again that same afternoon to dismiss classes. The lockdown was officially declared over at 5:23 p.m. No one was harmed and no firearm was found.

On March 15, 2019, the school was placed on lockdown again, this time for approximately two hours due to reports that a student had brought three live rounds of ammunition into the building, police took the alleged suspect into custody. No weapon was discovered inside the school and no one was harmed during the incident.

On November 19, 2024, the school was placed on lockdown for a third time for 1 hour and 15 minutes from 12:15 p.m. to 1:30 p.m. after reports of a stabbing which occurred between a student and two employees. One employee suffered a cut in the arm, while another suffered a cut in their abdomen. Philadelphia police discovered the suspect hiding behind a bookshelf, and then proceeded to restrain them then take them into custody, recovering the weapon in the process. The two stabbed employees recovered from the incident and returned shortly after.
