= Brett Mandel =

American politician (born 1969)

Democratic Committeeperson
- Constituency: 8th Ward

Personal details
- Born: May 10, 1969 (age 57)
- Party: Democratic

Brett Mandel (born May 10, 1969) is the author of two books about baseball and another about urban policy in Philadelphia.

== Early life and education ==
Mandel was born on May 10, 1969 and raised in Philadelphia, and is an alumnus of Northeast High School, graduating in 1987. He graduated magna cum laude as a Public Policy major from Hamilton College in 1991 before receiving his Master's Degree in Governmental Administration from the Fels Institute of Government at the University of Pennsylvania in 1993.

== Political career ==
He served as Director of the Financial & Policy Analysis Unit in the City Controller's office under former Controller Jonathan Saidel. He is the primary author of Philadelphia: A New Urban Direction, written while working under Saidel, which won the Association of Government Auditors Special Project Award in 1999.

In 2003, he was a member of the Tax Reform Commission, in addition to serving as Assistant Policy Director of the Philadelphia Independent Charter Commission.

=== Bulldog Budget ===
On January 23, 2013, Mandel unveiled his "Bulldog Budget", a data visualization of the operating budget of the city of Philadelphia. This digitized budget tool, built by Ben Garvey, shows how each department in the city spent its part of the $3.5 billion budget for fiscal year 2012. The data, collected by Mandel through a series of Right-to-Know Requests, includes individual salaries of all city employees. The tool was criticized by Mandel's opponent Alan Butkovitz for what he argued were inaccuracies in the data.

== Advocacy ==
Mandel is the former Executive Director of the National Education Technology Funding Corporation (Eddie Tech), a private, non-profit organization helping local public school districts to finance construction, renovation and modernization. He was Executive Director and founder of Philadelphia Forward, a non-profit organization promoting civic engagement.

== Writings ==
In addition to Philadelphia: A New Urban Direction, the book co-authored by Mandel on Philadelphia government, he has written two non-fiction books on baseball. Minor Players, Major Dreams tells the inside story of a minor-league baseball career, and Is This Heaven? The Magic of the Field of Dreams chronicles Mandel's pilgrimage to the set of the movie, Field of Dreams.
