= Med Jets Flight 056 =

2025 aviation accident in Pennsylvania

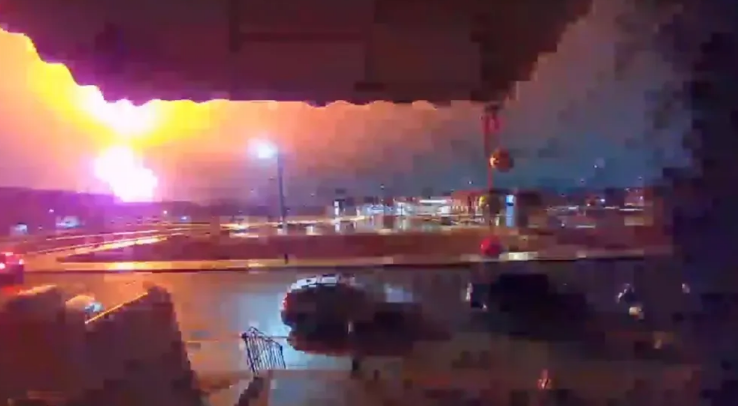
- A CCTV still of a fireball rising from the crash site

Accident
- Date: January 31, 2025
- Summary: Crashed shortly after takeoff, under investigation
- Site: Castor Gardens, Philadelphia, Pennsylvania, U.S.; 40°02′47″N 75°03′27″W
- Total fatalities: 8
- Total injuries: 24

Aircraft
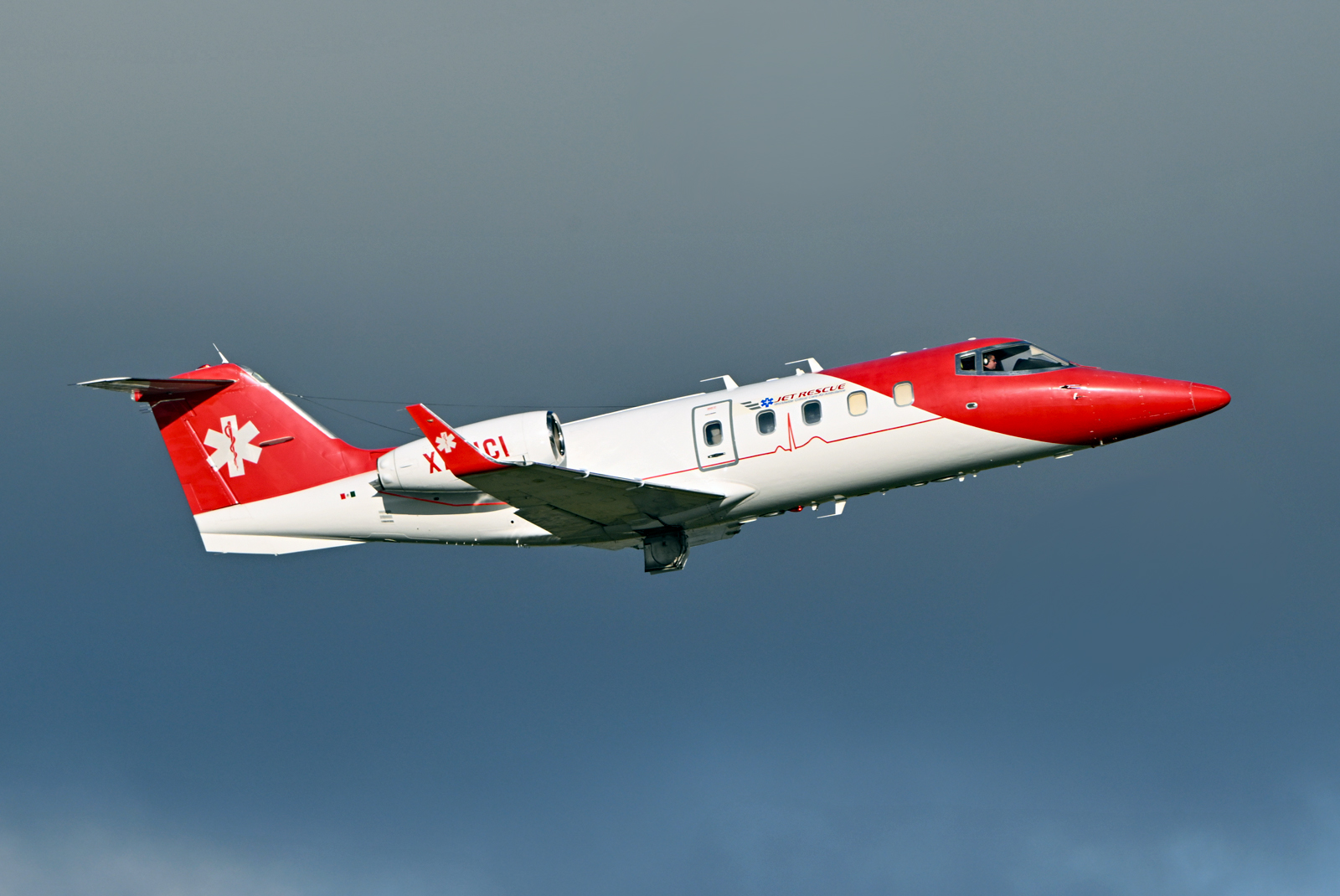
- XA-UCI, the aircraft involved in the accident, pictured in 2024
- Aircraft type: Learjet 55
- Operator: Jet Rescue Air Ambulance
- ICAO flight No.: MTS056
- Call sign: MEDSERVICE 056
- Registration: XA-UCI
- Flight origin: Northeast Philadelphia Airport, Philadelphia, Pennsylvania, U.S.
- Stopover: Springfield–Branson National Airport, Springfield, Missouri, U.S.
- Destination: Tijuana International Airport, Tijuana, Baja California, Mexico
- Occupants: 6
- Passengers: 2
- Crew: 4
- Fatalities: 6
- Survivors: 0

Ground casualties
- Ground fatalities: 2
- Ground injuries: 24

Med Jets Flight 056 was a medevac flight from Northeast Philadelphia Airport to Tijuana International Airport with a planned refueling stop at Springfield–Branson National Airport, operated by Jet Rescue Air Ambulance. On January 31, 2025, a Learjet 55 operating that flight crashed in the Castor Gardens neighborhood of Philadelphia, Pennsylvania, shortly after takeoff, killing everyone on board and two people on the ground.

Six people, including a young patient and her mother, were on board. The aircraft struck multiple buildings and vehicles during the accident, which caused fires and explosions that killed two people on the ground and injured at least 23 others.

== Background ==
Meteorological data recorded by the National Weather Service indicated the presence of light rain, overcast and foggy conditions, and a 30-mile-per-hour (48 km/h; 26 kn) wind gust recorded just before 6 p.m. in Philadelphia. Visibility was estimated at 6 miles (10 km; 5 nmi).

=== Aircraft ===
The aircraft involved in the medical evacuation was a Learjet 55 air ambulance operated by Jet Rescue Air Ambulance. It was registered as XA-UCI, and was manufactured in 1982. According to a statement from the Federal Aviation Administration (FAA), the aircraft departed on runway 24 from Northeast Philadelphia Airport at 6:06 p.m., en route to Springfield–Branson National Airport in Springfield, Missouri.

=== Passengers and crew ===
The FAA confirmed the six people were on board the Learjet 55.

Jet Rescue identified the crew as Captain Alan Alejandro Montoya Perales, with 9,200 flight hours. Co-pilot Josué Juárez had 2,600 flight hours.

The other 4 people on board were Doctor Raúl Meza Arredondo, and Paramedic Rodrigo López Padilla. They were transporting pediatric patient Valentina Guzmán Murillo and her mother, Lizeth Murillo Ozuna, from Ensenada, Mexico. All six individuals were Mexican nationals.

Valentina had recently completed four months of treatment at the Shriners Hospitals for Children in Philadelphia, where hospital staff had held a farewell celebration for her earlier that day. Dr. Meza Arredondo was the chief of neonatology at XE Médica Ambulancias and also practiced at a hospital in Atizapán de Zaragoza. The co-pilot, a resident of central Mexico with over ten years of flying experience, had been with Jet Rescue for more than a year.

== Accident ==
Ring doorbell footage of Flight 056 crashing

At 6:07 pm EST (UTC−5) on Friday, January 31, 2025, the Learjet 55 crashed near Roosevelt Mall at Cottman Avenue and Roosevelt Boulevard, with the aircraft and debris hitting several buildings. The aircraft took off from Northeast Philadelphia Airport on a southwest heading, climbed to 1,650 feet (500 m), disappeared from radar, then crashed 40 seconds later less than three miles (4.8 km; 2.6 nmi) away. The last received data from the aircraft shown by Flightradar24 reported the Learjet's altitude at 1,275 feet (389 m) and an increasing speed of 242 knots (448 km/h; 278 mph).

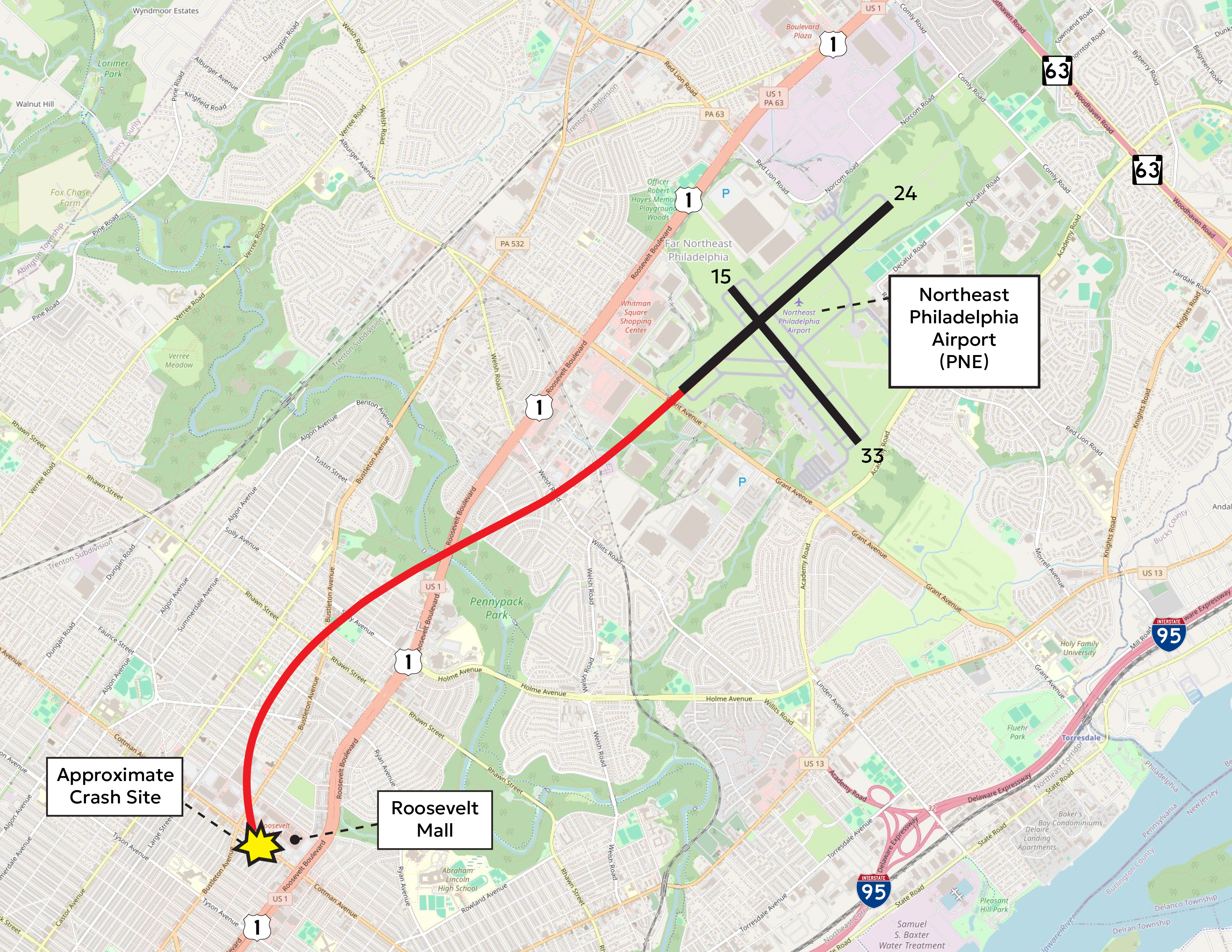
Map of the crash

The aircraft descended at a rate of around 11,000 feet per minute (3,350 m/min). A doorbell camera filmed the airplane in a steep dive out of the cloud base, before hitting the ground. A bright flash and large fireball was immediately observed rising behind a row of homes as the aircraft disintegrated and the fuel ignited. WTXF-TV coverage showed a large debris field and several secondary fires.

The crash was the second fatal accident involving Jet Rescue in 15 months, following a November 2023 runway excursion at Cuernavaca Airport in Mexico that killed four people.

The crash was the first of two fatal Mexican medevac flights in 2025, the other crashing in December on approach to Scholes International Airport at Galveston.

== Victims ==
On February 4, Jet Rescue Air Ambulance released the names of the crew and passengers aboard the flight: captain Alan Alejandro Montoya Perales, co-pilot Josué de Jesús Juárez Juárez, Dr. Raúl Meza Arredondo, paramedic Rodrigo López Padilla, pediatric patient Valentina Guzmán Murillo and her mother Lizeth Murillo Ozuna.

Two people in a car were killed: Steven Dreuitt died at the scene, and his fiance, Dominique Goods-Burke, died from her injuries on April 27. Dreuitt's son, who was also in the car, survived with severe burns. 23 other people on the ground were injured, at least three of them critically. The crash destroyed four homes and damaged 17 others along with several businesses, and ignited several homes and businesses in the Roosevelt Mall area, and vehicles. The fire spread to nearby row homes.

A university hospital admitted six victims on the ground, three of whom were treated and released on the same day. Another two were discharged later, while a second hospital admitted 15 people (12 released). The injured included a person eating in a diner who was struck in the head by crash debris that hurtled through a window.

== Aftermath ==
The FAA ordered a ground stop at Northeast Philadelphia Airport. The Philadelphia Police Department initiated a citywide emergency response to stop the spread of fires. Philadelphia's Office of Emergency Management closed roads near the crash site and kept citizens away from the scene.

== Investigation ==
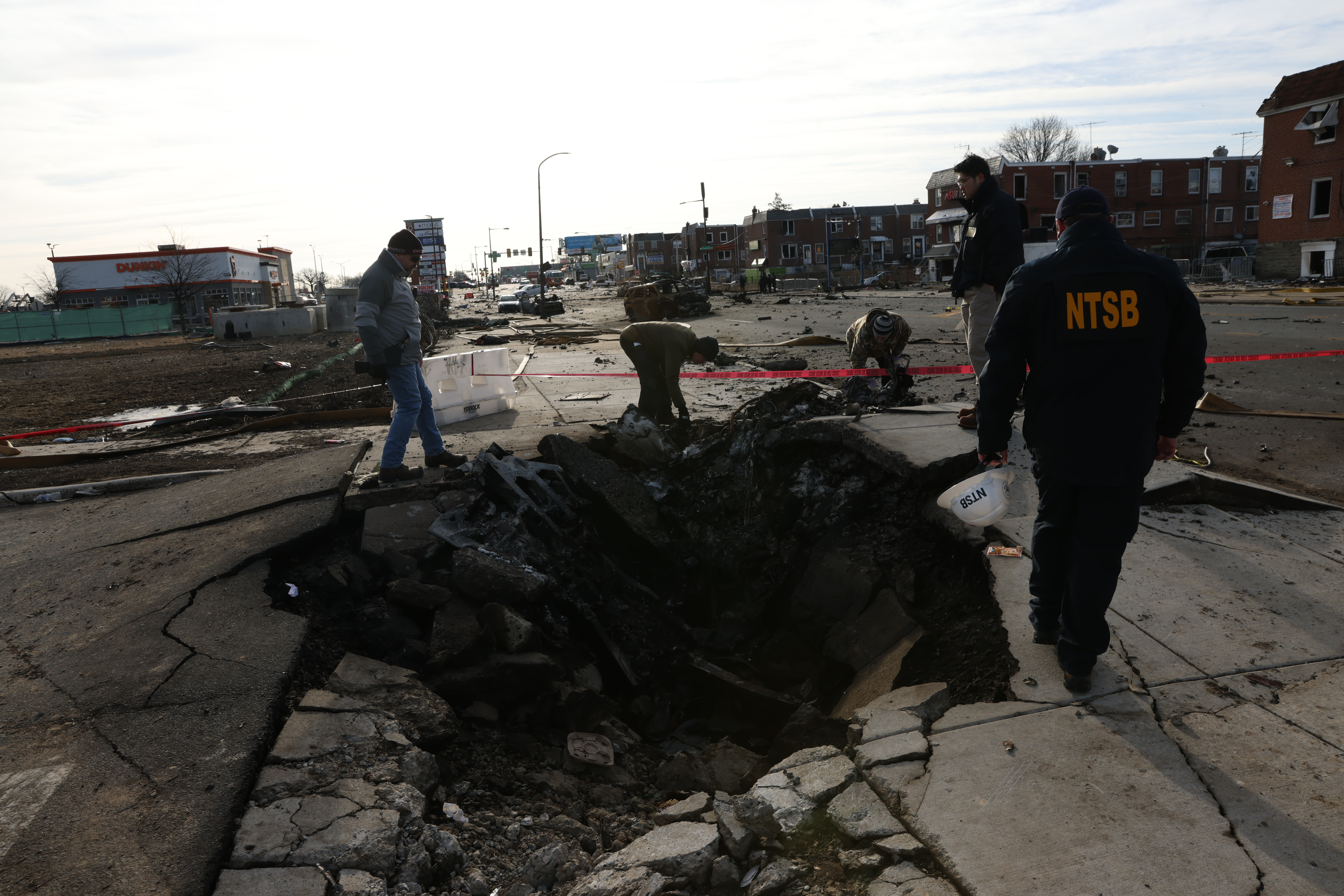
NTSB investigators at the crash scene on February 2

The FAA announced that it would investigate the crash, with the lead of the National Transportation Safety Board (NTSB). The NTSB stated that an investigator had arrived on January 31 and more officials would arrive on February 1.

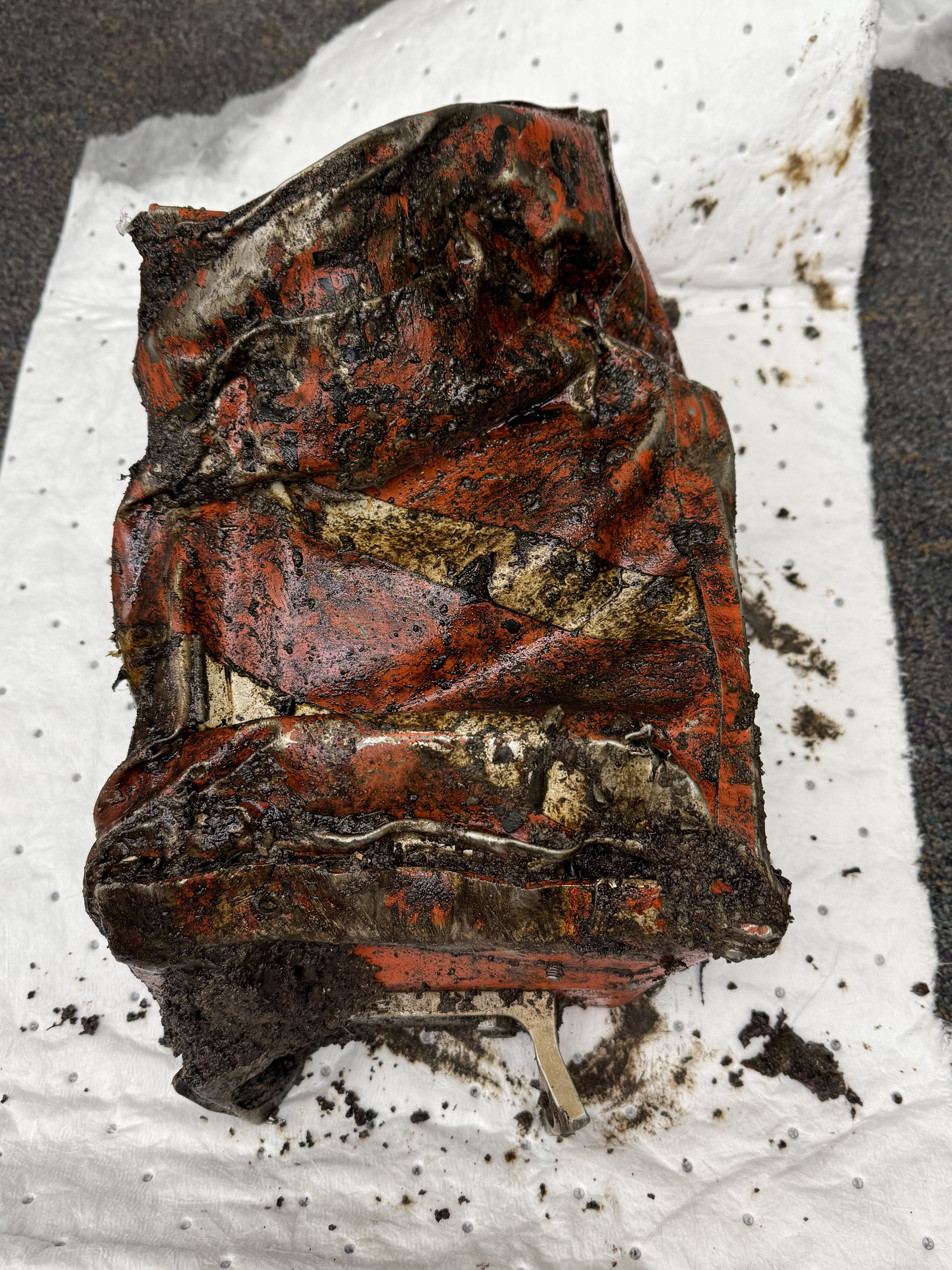
Cockpit voice recorder (CVR) recovered by NTSB from the crash site

On February 2, the NTSB recovered the cockpit voice recorder, the enhanced ground proximity warning system, which could contain flight data, and the two engines of the aircraft. These were sent for evaluation at the NTSB Vehicle Recorders Laboratory in Washington, D.C. On March 6, the NTSB announced in the crash preliminary report that the cockpit voice recorder had not recorded the flight and had likely been inoperative for several years.

In August 2026, the NTSB released its public docket for the accident as investigators completed the fact-finding phase and began preparation of the final report, a process that can take up to six months before conclusions are made public.

According to the docket, investigators noted several areas of inquiry but did not identify a probable cause. Factors examined included:

- The aircraft's pitch trim setting, which was found in the wreckage at 3.97 degrees versus the expected 5.5 degrees for takeoff, requiring increased control force.
- Pilot workload and experience, with records showing the crew had flown multi-leg trips in the four days preceding the accident and had not previously operated into or out of Northeast Philadelphia Airport.
- The cockpit voice recorder, which had been reported as inoperative for several years prior to the accident, was later repaired but contained audio from a prior flight only.

The docket also noted Federal Aviation Administration oversight, stating that Jet Rescue Air Ambulance was required to notify the FAA Dallas International Field Office before operating in the United States, but did not do so before the accident flight, and that no ramp checks were found on record prior to the crash.

== Responses ==
President Donald Trump was briefed on the situation. Commenting on Truth Social, he described the accident as a tragic loss of "innocent souls" and commended the efforts of first responders. Trump stated, "Our people are totally engaged," and added, "God Bless you all."

Governor of Pennsylvania Josh Shapiro, at the time of the crash located nearby in his hometown of Elkins Park, immediately went to the site and spoke at at least two press conferences. He and his office coordinated response efforts with Mayor of Philadelphia Cherelle Parker, the Office of Emergency Management, the Philadelphia Police Department, and the Philadelphia Fire Department, and said that all state resources were available for assistance.

Mike Driscoll, councilmember of the 6th District of the Philadelphia City Council and chair of the Transportation and Utilities Committee, described the situation as an active emergency response with reported mass casualties. He urged the public to avoid the area and highlighted the focus on supporting first responders and affected families.

State Representative Jared Solomon, who represents the district where the crash occurred, described the neighborhood as a working-class area of dense row homes, telling the AP, "These are just people who want to help others. They're nurses, they're construction workers, they are first responders. In a community that is always poised to help others in and around our city, now we sort of are able to turn inward and all unite together."

Mexican president Claudia Sheinbaum expressed condolences to the crash fatalities and ordered the Secretary of Foreign Affairs to assist their families.

== See also ==
- 2025 in aviation
- 2026 Palm Beach County Learjet 60 crash, a 2026 crash involving a nose-diving crash with the Learjet
