= Northeast Philadelphia Airport =

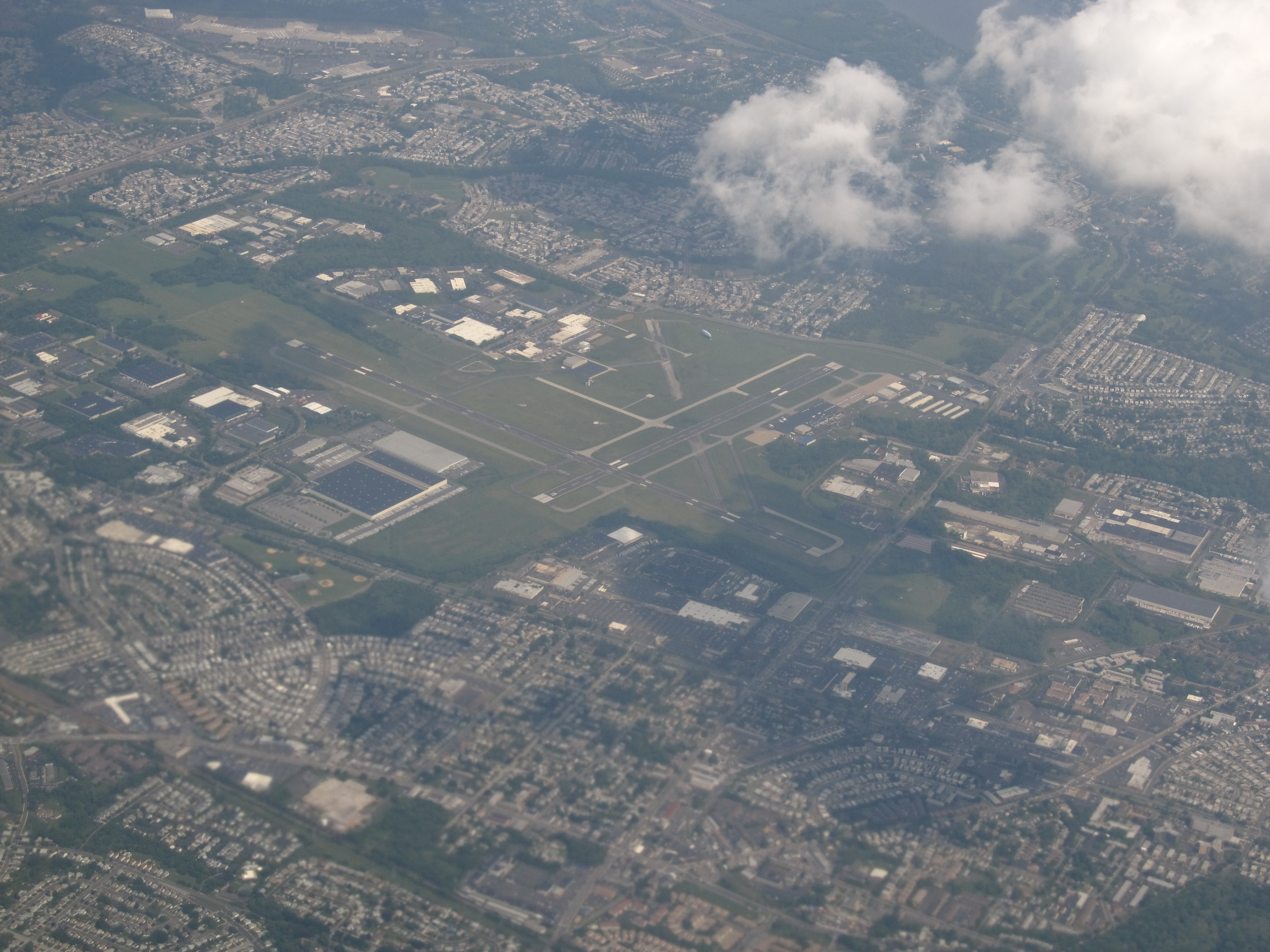
- IATA: PNE; ICAO: KPNE; FAA LID: PNE

Summary
- Airport type: Public
- Owner: City of Philadelphia
- Serves: Philadelphia, Pennsylvania
- Elevation AMSL: 120 ft / 37 m
- Coordinates: 40°04′55″N 075°00′38″W
- Website: phl.org

Maps
- Location of airport in Philadelphia PNE (Pennsylvania) PNE (the United States)

Runways
Direction	Length		Surface
Direction	ft	m	Surface
06/24	7,000	2,134	Asphalt
15/33	4,999	1,524	Asphalt

Statistics (2022)
- Aircraft operations: 83,551
- Based aircraft: 143
- Sources: airport website and FAA

Northeast Philadelphia Airport (IATA: PNE, ICAO: KPNE, FAA LID: PNE) is a public airport just north of the intersection of Grant Avenue and Ashton Road in Northeast Philadelphia. It is part of the Philadelphia Airport System along with Philadelphia International Airport and is the general aviation reliever airport for Philadelphia International. Northeast Philadelphia Airport is the sixth busiest airport in Pennsylvania. Two fixed-base operators provide fuel, major aircraft repair, hangar rental, aircraft rental and charter, flight instruction, and aircraft sales.

== Location ==
This airport covers 1,150 acres (470 ha), bounded by Grant Avenue to the south, Academy Road to the east, Comly Road to the north, and the Roosevelt Boulevard (U.S. 1) to the west. (The airport does not extend all the way to these boundaries.) Development includes a Pepsi-Cola bottling plant, an industrial park with aviation-related businesses, the headquarters of the 1st and 8th Districts of the Philadelphia Police Department, and the former site of the Internal Revenue Service Philadelphia Service Center. A TJ Maxx distribution center and an ice skating rink opened in 2001 on land leased from the airport.

When the airport opened, the surrounding area was largely open farmland. Residential neighborhoods and businesses have since developed close to the airport, so pilots must observe noise abatement procedures.

== History ==
Northeast Philadelphia Airport started in the 1930s as the Northeast Airport, a grass field with no paved runways, one of three small airports in the area. Just across Roosevelt Boulevard to the west, next to Red Lion Road, was Boulevard Airport, the most important of the three. Further west was Budd Field (built for Edward G. Budd Manufacturing Company, later as a golf course and other parts for housing) and Somerton Airport (near Bustleton Avenue and Red Lion Road), no longer in existence, close enough that pilots had to take care not to infringe on adjacent traffic patterns. The site of the Boulevard Airport is now a shopping mall (Red Lion Plaza) and housing. The Northeast Airport became today's large airport.

The United States Army Air Corps began construction of a 545 acres (221 ha) airbase in Northeast Philadelphia during World War II, but the project was never completed and the property was turned over to the city in 1944. After the city finished the work, Philadelphia Northeast Airport opened in June 1945. In 1948 the name was changed to North Philadelphia Airport.

The airport expanded in 1960 when Runway 6/24 was extended to its present length. Runway 10/28 was abandoned at this time due to construction on the western end of the runway. The name was changed again in 1980, to the present Northeast Philadelphia Airport.

The airport was the headquarters and maintenance facility for Ransome Airlines, which operated scheduled passenger flights as Allegheny Commuter to Washington D.C. via Reagan National Airport (DCA) and to nearby Philadelphia International Airport (PHL) as well as to other regional destinations beginning in September 1973 as a feeder for Allegheny Airlines. Ransome's passenger operation from PNE was ended by the PATCO strike of 1981 which cut regional airline schedules by 25 percent; the airline operated independently for some time, fed Delta Air Lines flights in the early 1980s, and was later sold to Pan American World Airways and then to Trans World Airlines, ending its life as Trans World Express. PNE continued to be a maintenance base for TWE through the early 1990s. The base shut down in 1995, with a loss of 300 local jobs.

== Facilities and aircraft ==
Northeast Philadelphia Airport covers 1,150 acres (470 ha) at an elevation of 120 feet (37 m) above mean sea level. It has two asphalt runways: 6/24 is 7,000 by 100 feet (2,134 x 30 m) and 15/33 is 4,999 by 150 feet (1,524 x 46 m).

In the year ending December 7, 2022, the airport had 83,551 aircraft operations, average 229 per day: 94% general aviation, 5% air taxi and less than 1% military. 143 aircraft were then based at the airport: 90 single-engine, 28 multi-engine, 17 jet and 8 helicopter.

== Tenants ==
- AgustaWestland Philadelphia Corporation (Note: A wholly-owned subsidiary of Leonardo Helicopters, publicly branded as "Leonardo Helicopters, AgustaWestland products")

== Incidents and accidents ==
- On Tuesday, October 7, 1952, a USAF Douglas C-47 crashed one mile (1.6 km) north of PNE attempting to land but impacted swampy terrain; the three-man flight crew was killed, but all three enlisted passengers survived the early morning crash.
- On Thursday, April 4, 1991, a Sunbell Aviation Helicopters Bell 412 collided in mid-air with a Piper Aerostar which was flying from Williamsport to Philadelphia International Airport. The Piper was carrying U.S. Senator John Heinz when it collided over Merion Elementary School in Lower Merion Township. All five aboard both aircraft and two children at the school were killed. Already airborne, the helicopter had offered to observe the status of the nose landing gear of the plane; while moving in for a closer look, its rotors struck the plane, causing both aircraft to lose control and crash shortly after noon. The subsequent NTSB investigation attributed the cause of the crash to poor judgment by the pilots of both aircraft.
- On Friday, January 31, 2025, Med Jets Flight 056 departed PNE on runway 24 and crashed approximately two miles (3 km) southwest, near Roosevelt Mall. All six occupants of the Learjet 55 and one person on the ground (in a vehicle) were killed in the early evening crash, and several patrons at the nearby mall were injured.

== See also ==
- List of airports in Pennsylvania
