= Roosevelt Mall =

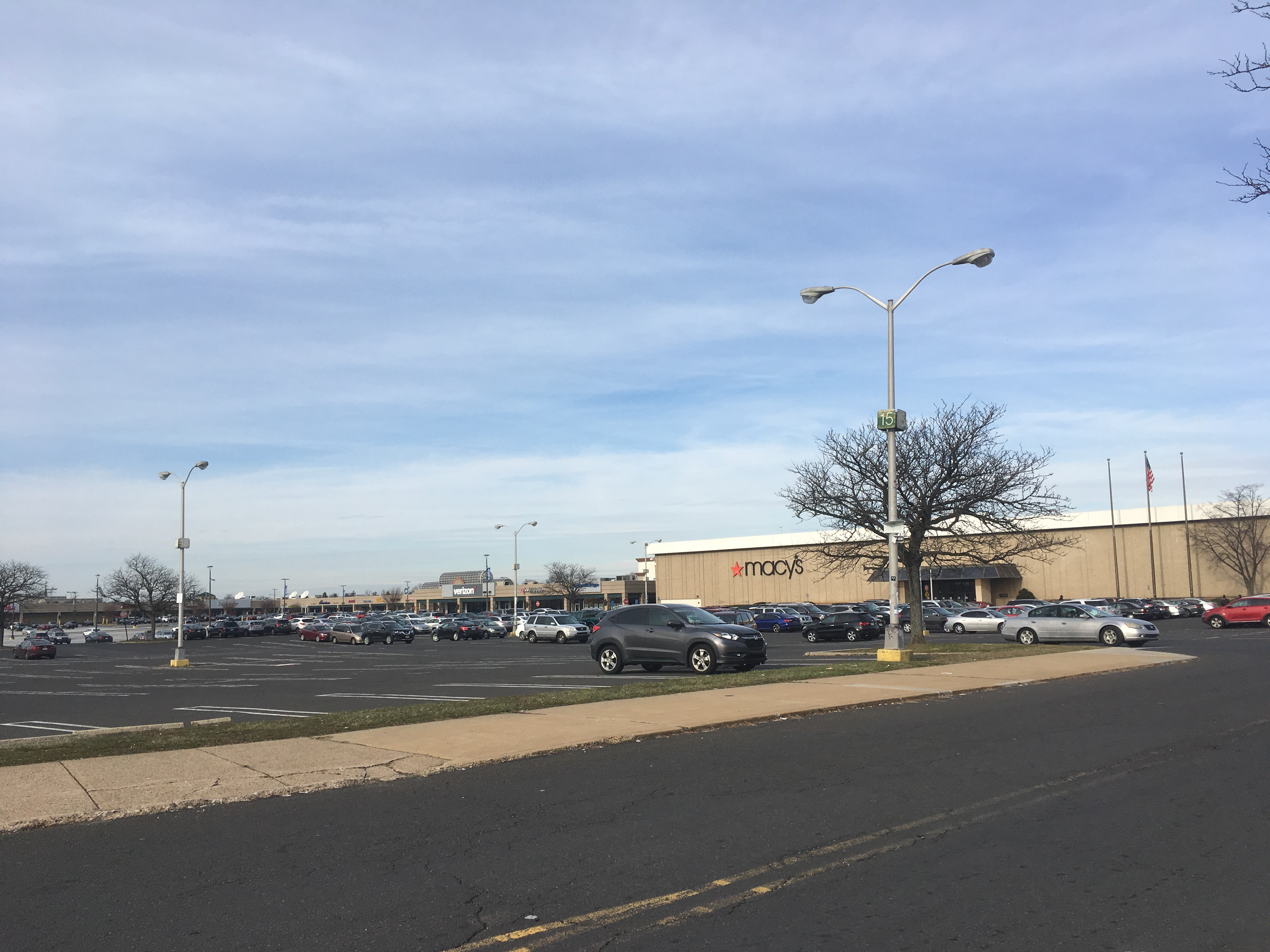
- Roosevelt Mall looking towards Macy's
- Location: Northeast Philadelphia
- Coordinates: 40.04667°N 75.05667°W
- Opened: 1964
- Num. of stores: 45
- Num. of anchor tenants: 1
- Floor area: 562,269 square feet (52,236.5 m^{2})
- Floors: 1 (3 in Macy's)
- Parking: Parking lot
- Public transit: SEPTA bus: 1, 14, 20, 50, 58, 70, 77, Boulevard Direct

Roosevelt Mall is a medium-sized outdoor shopping mall, located along Pennsylvania Route 73 (Cottman Avenue) between Bustleton Avenue west end and U.S. Route 1 (Roosevelt Boulevard) in the east end, or Rhawnhurst neighborhood, of Northeast Philadelphia, Pennsylvania.

The mall has 45 stores and services. It is currently anchored by a large, three-level Macy's department store on its east end. Since 2015, the mall has featured a flea market on Saturdays during the summer.

== History ==
Since opening in 1964, Roosevelt Mall anchors have included S. Klein, Wanamaker's, Hecht's, Strawbridge's, and Macy's. The original anchor, S. Klein, closed in 1975 due to the financial problems of its owner, McCrory Stores. It was replaced by Wanamaker's in 1976 and was converted to Hecht's in 1995 following May Department Stores' acquisition of the Wanamaker's chain. About a year later, Hecht's became Strawbridge's. During the Strawbridge's years, it had a bargain basement in which all furniture and goods were marked down by 80%. Following Federated Department Stores' acquisition of May Department Stores in 2005, Strawbridge's was rebranded as Macy's in 2006.

The mall was also home to a location of prominent cheesesteak restaurant chain Jim's Steaks, closed due to health violations in 2017.

On January 31, 2025, a Learjet 55 crashed on the perimeter of the mall shortly after takeoff from Northeast Philadelphia Airport, killing 8 people (6 in aircraft, 2 on ground) and injuring several others.

== Great Northeast Plaza ==
Located directly across from Roosevelt Mall is Great Northeast Plaza, which was formerly anchored by Sears. Prior to Sears, it was anchored by Gimbels.
