= Learjet =

Manufacturer of business jets

- Founded: 1962; 64 years ago
- Founder: Bill Lear
- Defunct: 2021; 5 years ago
- Fate: Acquired by Bombardier Aerospace in 1990, production ceased in 2021
- Headquarters: Wichita, Kansas, U.S.
- Parent: Bombardier Aviation (1990–2021)
- Subsidiaries: Brantly Helicopter Corporation (1966–1969)

Learjet was a manufacturer of business jets for civilian and military use based in Wichita, Kansas, United States. Founded in the late 1950s by William Powell Lear as Swiss American Aviation Corporation, it became a subsidiary of Canadian Bombardier Aerospace in 1990, which marketed the company’s aircraft as the "Bombardier Learjet Family". The 3,000th Learjet was delivered in June 2017. The Learjet line was once sufficiently popular that the Learjet name became synonymous and interchangeable with the terms business jet or private jet in the popular vernacular. In February 2021, Bombardier announced the end of production for all new Learjet aircraft in 2021, with the continuation of support and maintenance for aircraft currently in service.

== History ==
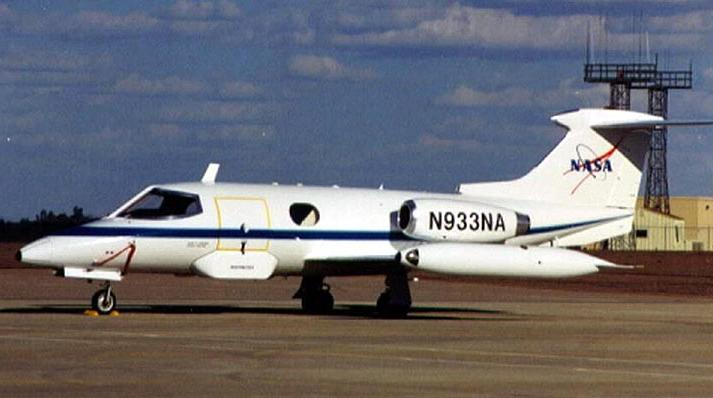
The company's first aircraft, the Learjet 23

Learjet was one of the first companies to manufacture a private, luxury aircraft. Lear's preliminary design was based upon an experimental American military aircraft known as the Marvel, substituting fuselage-mounted turbojet engines for ducted fan turboshaft engines. However, that preliminary design was abandoned and the final Learjet design was instead adapted from an abortive 1950s Swiss ground-attack fighter aircraft, the FFA P-16.

The basic structure of the Swiss P-16 aircraft was seen by Bill Lear and his team as a good starting point to the development of a business jet, and formed the Swiss American Aircraft Corporation (SAAC), located in Altenrhein, Switzerland, and staffed with design engineers from Switzerland, Germany and Britain. The aircraft was originally intended to be called the SAAC-23. The wing with its distinctive tip fuel tanks and landing gear of the first Learjets were little changed from those used by the fighter prototypes. Although building the first jet started in Switzerland, the tooling for building the aircraft was moved to Wichita, Kansas, in 1962. Bill Jr stated that it took too long to get anything done in Switzerland despite the cheaper labor costs. LearJet was in a temporary office which opened in September 1962 while the plant at Wichita's airport was under construction. On February 7, 1963, assembly of the first Learjet began. The next year, the company was renamed the Lear Jet Corporation.

The original Learjet 23 was a six- to eight-seater and first flew on October 7, 1963, with the first production model being delivered in October 1964. Just over a month later, Lear Jet became a publicly owned corporation. Several derived models followed, with the Model 24 first flying on February 24, 1966, and the Model 25 first flying on August 12, 1966. On September 19 of the same year, the company was renamed Lear Jet Industries Inc.

=== Merger with Gates Aviation ===
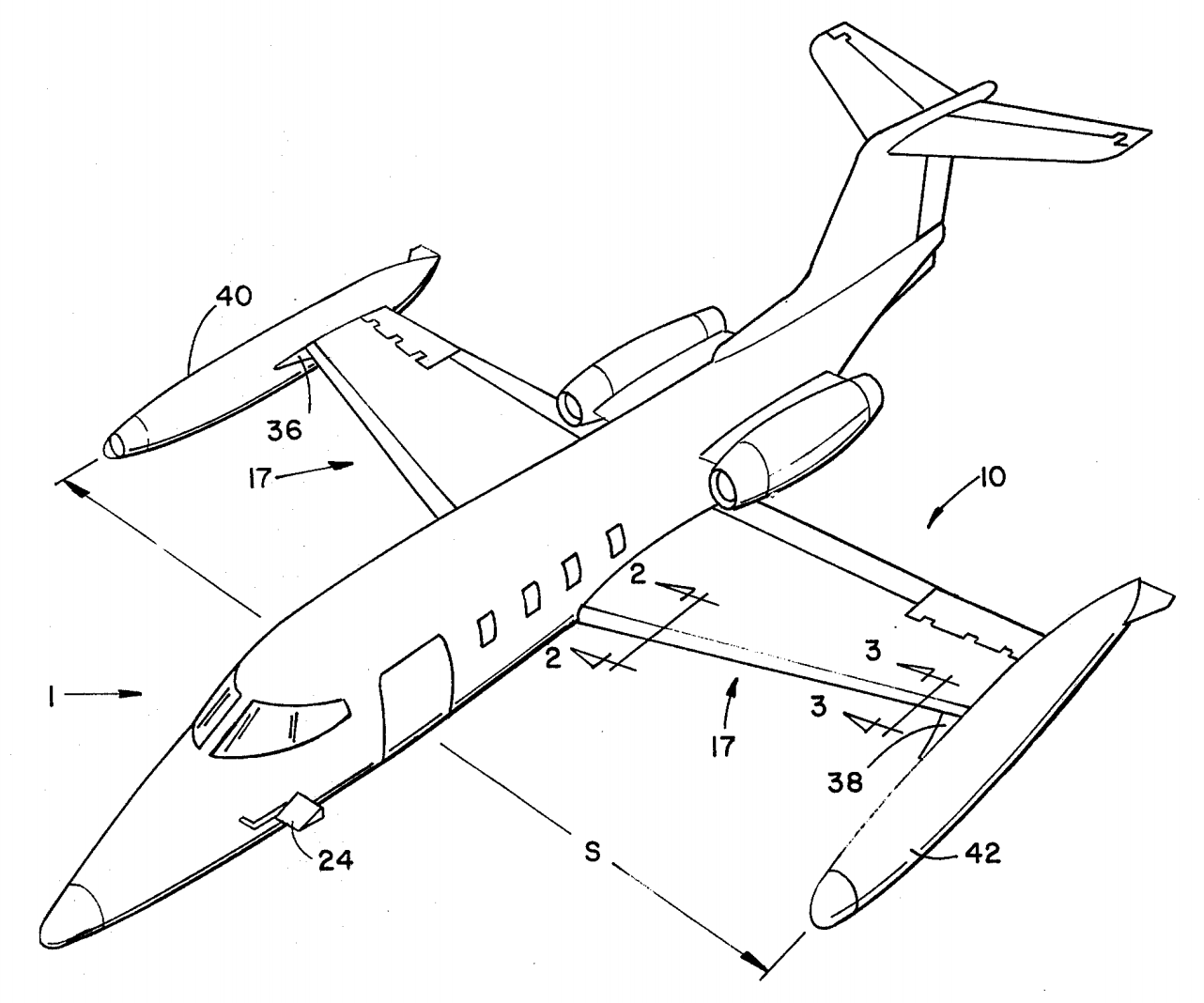
Gates Learjet patent filed June 24, 1976, showing the initial Learjet configuration with tip tanks

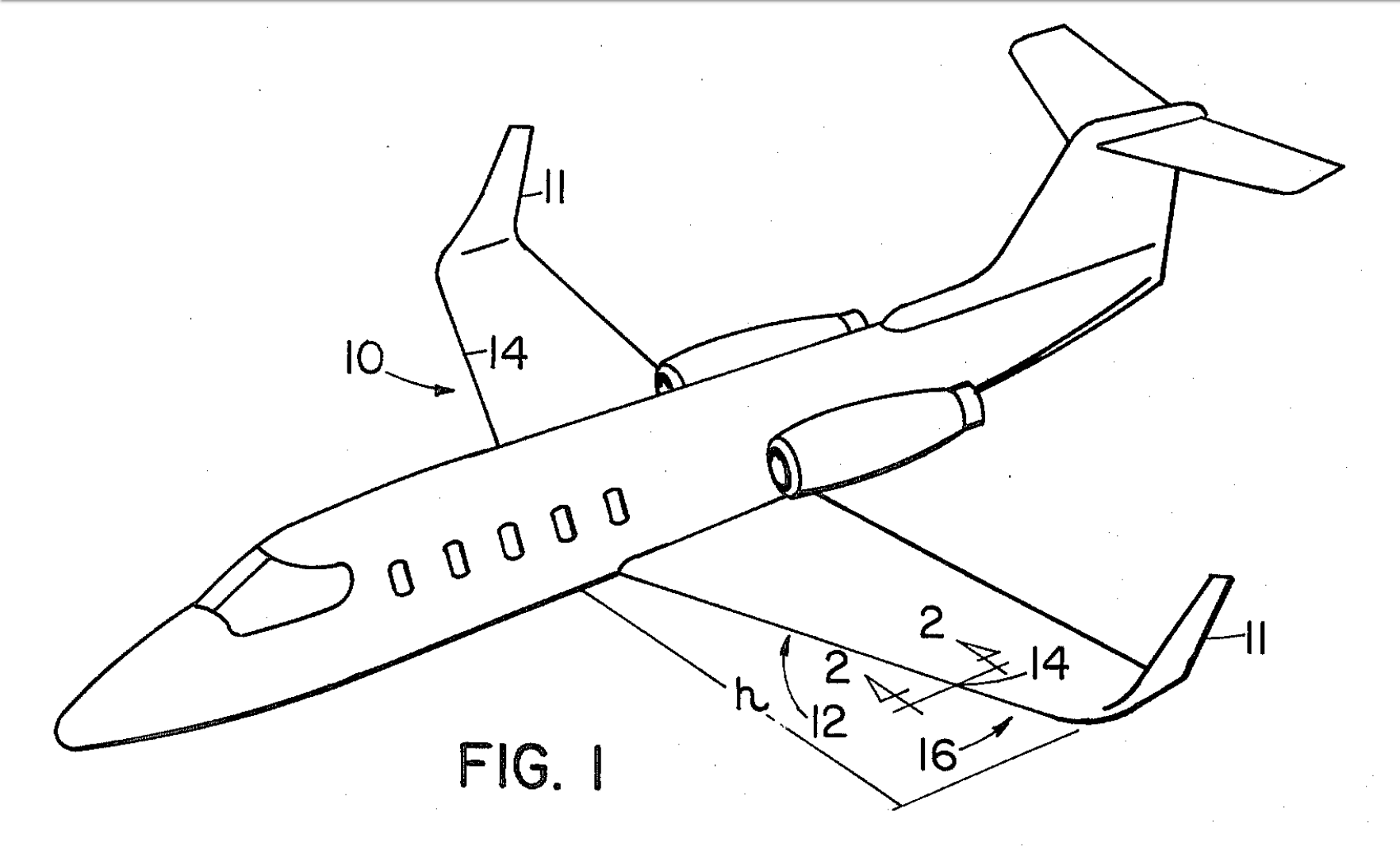
Gates Learjet patent filed Aug 28, 1978, showing the later Learjet configuration with winglets

On April 10, 1967, Bill Lear's approximately 60% share of the venture was acquired by the Gates Rubber Company of Denver, Colorado, for US$27 million (equivalent to $261,000,000 in 2025). Lear remained on the company board until April 2, 1969, when the company was merged with Gates Aviation Corporation and was renamed Gates Learjet Corporation. In 1971, the first Model 25 powered by a Garrett TFE731-2 turbofan engine was flown. This aircraft later became the successful Learjet 35. That year, the company was awarded the President's "E" Award for promoting export sales.

In 1974, the worldwide Learjet fleet had exceeded the one-million flight hours mark and, in 1975, the company produced its 500th jet, both industry firsts. By late 1976, the company increased monthly aircraft production to ten.

On August 24, 1977, the Learjet 28 made its first flight. It was based on the Learjet 25, but received a completely new wing fitted with winglets. These resulted in both improved performance and fuel economy and inspired the name "Longhorn" for the short-lived Learjet 28/29 and for some of the more successful models that followed.

On April 19, 1979, the prototype for the Model 54/55/56 series made its first flight, and on July 7, 1983, a standard production Model 55 set six new time-to-climb records for its weight class.

In 1984, Gates Learjet announced the start of their Aerospace Division, a high technology endeavor. However, by the end of the year the company had ceased production of its commercial jets in an effort to reduce inventories. This lasted until February 1986, when the company headquarters were transferred to Tucson, Arizona, and production was restarted both in Wichita and Tucson.

On September 10, 1985, the Aerospace Division was awarded a contract to produce parts for the Space Shuttle's main engines. In 1987, Gates Learjet was acquired by Integrated Acquisition and the next year the name was changed to Learjet Corporation. By January 1989, all production had been moved from the Tucson facility back to Wichita with an employment of 1,250.

=== Acquisition by Bombardier ===
In 1990, Canadian company Bombardier Aerospace purchased the Learjet Corporation. The aircraft were then marketed as the "Bombardier Learjet Family". On October 10, 1990, the Learjet 60 mid-sized aircraft had its first flight, followed on October 7, 1995, by the Learjet 45.

In October 2007, Bombardier Learjet launched a brand new aircraft program, the Learjet 85. It was the first FAR Part-25 all-composite business aircraft. Bombardier celebrated the 45th anniversary of the first flight by a Learjet with 2008's Year of Learjet campaign. One of its highlights was British Formula One racing driver Lewis Hamilton racing a Learjet and winning an event at the Farnborough Air Show.

On October 28, 2015 Bombardier announced cancellation of the Learjet 85 program. On February 11, 2021, Bombardier announced the end production of all Learjet aircraft. Bombardier also announced they would continue to fully support the Learjet fleet well into the future, and launched the Learjet RACER re-manufacturing program for the Learjet 40 and Learjet 45 aircraft. As Bombardier focuses on its larger Challenger and Global jets, the final aircraft, a Learjet 75, was delivered on 28 March 2022 after 60 years of production, delivering more than 3,000 aircraft, of which more than 2,000 remain in service.

=== Location ===
Learjet started off in Wichita, Kansas, and as of 2013 has over 3,200 employees. Wichita was not the only candidate for the location of Lear's project. Grand Rapids, Michigan, and Ohio were also both locations that were being considered. There were already a few other aircraft companies that were located in Kansas, which meant there were many more potential workers who would possess the skills that Lear needed to run his company in the design and manufacturing of the aircraft. Lear was offered an industrial revenue bond of 1.2 million US dollars. This would be known as the first historical industrial revenue bond offered by the city. To this day, the Learjet facility is still located in Wichita, Kansas, and is currently getting ready to be renovated, by expanding the Flight Test Center and building a new center for delivery.

== Brand timeline ==
- Lear Jet: 1962–1969
- Gates Learjet: 1969–1988
- LearJet: 1988–1990
- Bombardier Learjet: 1990–2021

== Aircraft ==
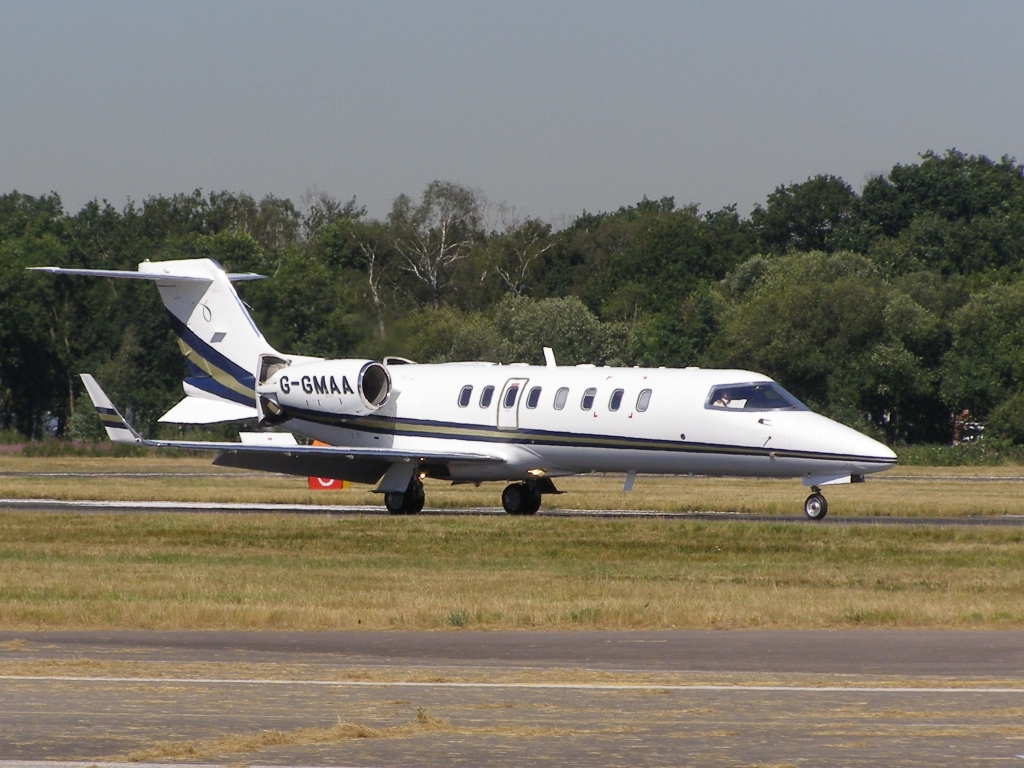
Learjet 45 of Gama Aviation

Model name	First flight	Number built	Type
Learjet 23	1963	101	Twin engine business jet
Learjet 24	1966	259	Twin engine business jet
Learjet 25	1966	369	Twin engine business jet
Learjet 28	1977	5	Twin engine business jet
Learjet 29	1977	4	Twin engine business jet
Learjet 31	1987	246	Twin engine business jet
Learjet 35	1973	675+	Twin engine business jet
Learjet 36		64	Twin engine business jet
Learjet 40	2002	133	Twin engine business jet
Learjet 45	1995	642	Twin engine business jet
Learjet 55	1979	147	Twin engine business jet
Learjet 60	1990	430	Twin engine business jet
Learjet 70		13	Twin engine business jet
Learjet 75		156	Twin engine business jet
Learjet 85	2014	2	Twin engine business jet

=== Timeline ===
Learjet timeline
		Lear Jet							Gates Learjet																			LearJet		Bombardier Learjet
1960s										1970s										1980s										1990s										2000s										2010s										2020s
0	1	2	3	4	5	6	7	8	9	0	1	2	3	4	5	6	7	8	9	0	1	2	3	4	5	6	7	8	9	0	1	2	3	4	5	6	7	8	9	0	1	2	3	4	5	6	7	8	9	0	1	2	3	4	5	6	7	8	9	0	1	2	3
		Learjet 23*				Learjet 24*: increased MTOW
						Learjet 25*: 24 stretch
																	Learjet 28/29*: new wing										Learjet 31†: 28/29 wing + 35/36 fuselage & engines
													Learjet 35/36† 25 stretch + TFE731 turbofans																													Learjet 40†: shorter 45											Learjet 70/75†: improved 45
																																			Learjet 45†: new design																		Learjet 70/75†: improved 45
																					Learjet 55†: 28/29 Wing										Learjet 60‡: longer 55, PW300																							85‡
4.95ft cabin width										5.92ft cabin width										5.12ft cabin width										*: CJ-610 turbojets										†: TFE731 turbofans										‡: PW300 turbofans

== See also ==
- Canadair
- de Havilland Canada
- LearAvia Lear Fan
- LearStar 600—never produced by LearJet and designs sold to Canadair and became Canadair Challenger 600
