= Learjet 70/75 =

Airplane

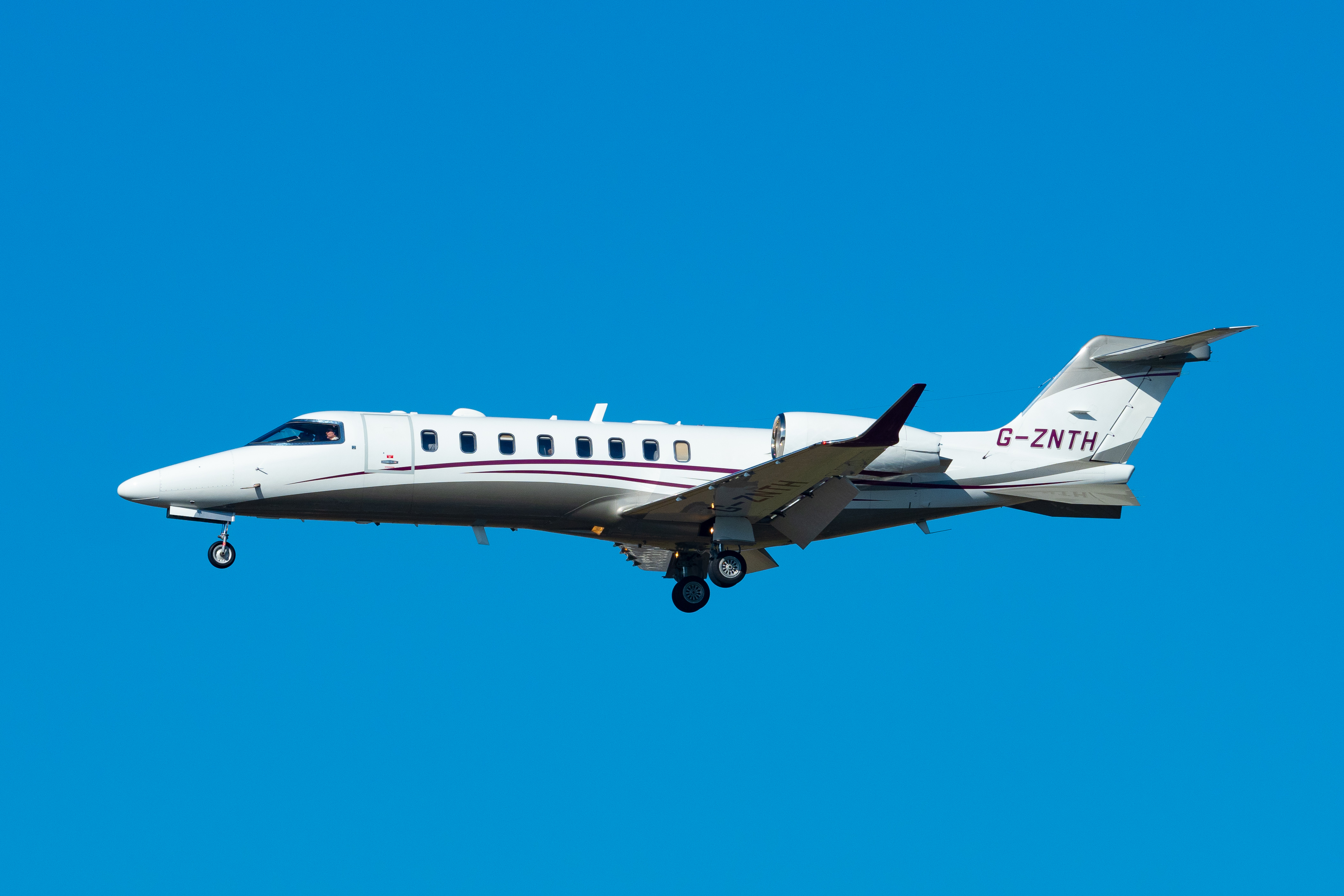

General information
- Type: Light business jet
- National origin: Canada/United States
- Manufacturer: Bombardier Aerospace (Bombardier Aviation after 2019)
- Status: Production completed
- Primary user: Zenith Aviation (4)
- Number built: 169 total: 13 Learjet 70, 156 Learjet 75

History
- Manufactured: 2013–2022
- Developed from: Learjet 40/45

The Learjet 70/75 is a mid-sized business jet airplane manufactured by the Learjet division of Canadian aircraft manufacturer Bombardier Aerospace. With production ending in 2022, it is the last Learjet model.

== Design ==
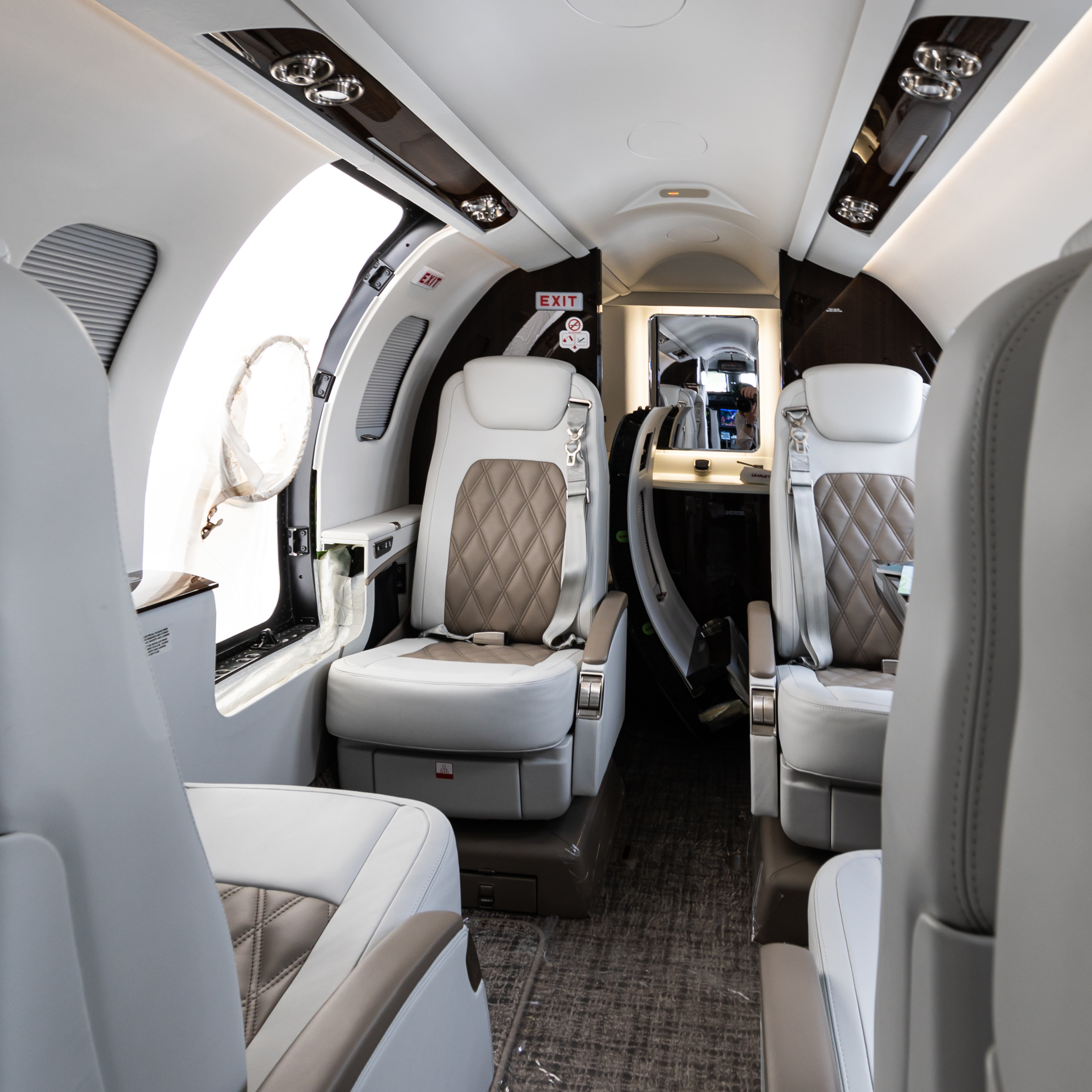
The flat-floor cabin is 4.9 by 5.1 ft (1.50 by 1.55 m) wide and high.

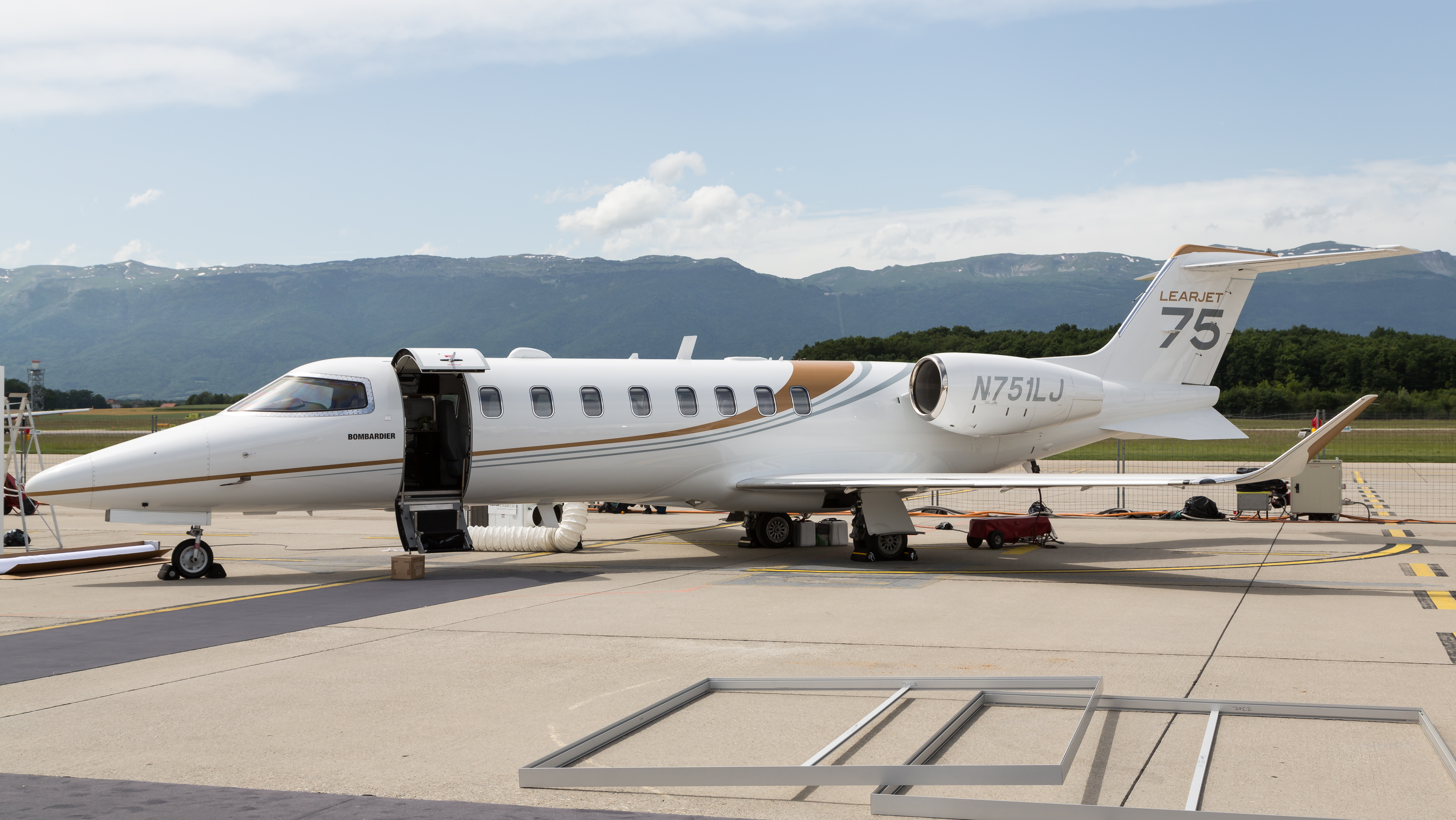
Learjet 75 left side, with the door open

These models feature new avionics, winglets, and powerful engines that use less fuel.

The Learjet 40/45 light jet is updated with touchscreen-controlled Garmin G5000 avionics and a modern interior. The combination of aerodynamic improvements, which lowered the design's drag by 2%, and 200 lbs less weight in the nose section resulted in an increased range of 4%.

The canted winglet design was incorporated from the Bombardier Global 7500/8000.

Both variants are powered by 3,850 lbf (17.1 kN) Honeywell TFE731-40BR turbofans with thrust reversers, have a MTOW of 21,500 lb (9,800 kg) and a fuel capacity of 6,062 lb (2,750 kg) for a maximum range of 2,050 nmi (2,360 mi; 3,800 km) with four passengers. Typical cruise is Mach .76 and high-speed cruise is Mach .79, the ceiling is FL510 where the cabin altitude is 8,000 ft (2,400 m). Their flat-floor cabin width is 4 ft 11 in by 5 ft 1 in (1.50 by 1.55 m) high, the Learjet 70's seven-seat cabin length is 17 ft 8 in and 19 ft 10 in (5.38 and 6.05 m) for the nine-seat, double-club Learjet 75. The forward galley facing the entry door is isolated by a pocket door from the seating area with a Lufthansa Technik cabin management, and the aft lavatory has a belted seat. The 50 cu ft (1.4 m^{3}) external baggage hold is heated but not pressurized.

At FL410, ISA + 3 °C (5 °F) and Mach .78 for 462 kn (532 mph; 856 km/h), its hourly fuel burn is 1,000 lb (450 kg) and 1,400 lb (640 kg) at Mach .80.

== Development ==
Two of the planned five flight test aircraft, a modified Learjet 40XR and Learjet 45XR, had flown by July 2012.

The Learjet 75 received its type certificate from the FAA on 14 November 2013. Deliveries began shortly thereafter. (Note: The "start of the delivery process" began on 17 October 2013.) This delay in certification caused order cancellations, and Bombardier's overall deliveries fell below expectations. By 2015, the unit cost of the Learjet 70 was US$11.3 million, and US$13.8 million for the Learjet 75. By 2016, production of Learjet 70 had been temporarily discontinued due to lack of orders (with Learjet 75 still being produced at that time).

The 100th Learjet 75 was delivered in June 2017.

By January 2019, Bombardier had delivered 132 Learjet 40/40XRs, 454 45/45XRs, and nearly 130 70/75s, including 24 in 2016 and 14 in 2017. In June, Bombardier launched the sub-$10 million Learjet 75 Liberty to compete with the Cessna CitationJet and Embraer Phenom 300 from 2020, with six seats down from eight, no standard APU or lavatory sink, but still Part 25 and not FAR Part 23 certified, with a maximum payload of 2,910 lb (1,320 kg) and a range of 2,080 nmi (2,390 mi; 3,850 km).

Bombardier announced the end of the production of Learjet aircraft by the end of 2021. The final Learjet 75 was manufactured in January 2022. As Bombardier focuses on its larger Challenger and Global jets, it was delivered on 28 March 2022.

== Deliveries ==
Year	2013	2014	2015	2016	2017	2018	2019	All
Deliveries	18	33	32	24	14	12	12	145

== Specifications (Learjet 75) ==
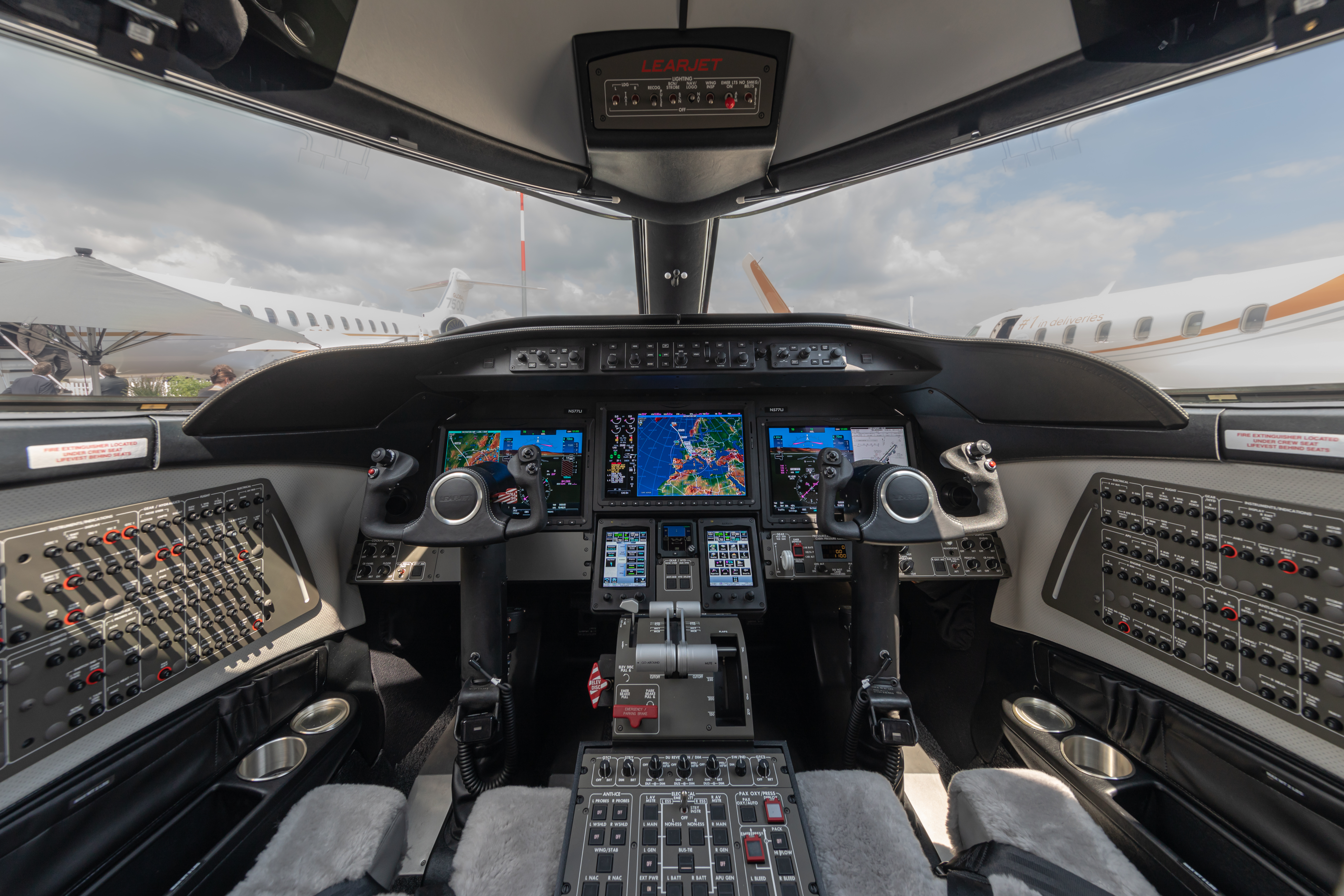
Cockpit of a Learjet 75

Data from Bombardier

General characteristics

- Crew: 2
- Capacity: 8 + 1 passengers
- Length: 58 ft 0 in (17.7 m)
- Wingspan: 50 ft 11 in (15.5 m)
- Height: 14.13 ft (4.31 m)
- Wing area: 311.6 sq ft (28.95 m^{2})
- Empty weight: 13,890 lb (6,300 kg)
- Max takeoff weight: 21,500 lb (9,752 kg)
- Pressurization: 9.4 psi (0.65 bar)
- Powerplant: 2 × Honeywell TFE731-40BR Turbine, 3,850 lbf (17.1 kN) thrust each

Performance

- Cruise speed: 465 kn (535 mph, 861 km/h) high speed cruise
- Range: 2,040 nmi (2,350 mi, 3,780 km)
- Service ceiling: 51,000 ft (16,000 m)
- Wing loading: 69.00 lb/sq ft (336.9 kg/m^{2})
- Fuel burn at high-speed cruise: 1,079 lb/h (489 kg/h) at 451 kn TAS at FL470
- Fuel burn at long-range cruise: 977 lb/h (443 kg/h) at 437 kn TAS at FL470

Avionics

- Garmin G5000

== See also ==
Aircraft of comparable role, configuration and era:

- Beechcraft Premier I
- Citation CJ4
- Embraer Phenom 300
- Grob G180 SPn
- Hawker 400
- Pilatus PC-24
- SyberJet SJ30
