= Learjet 45 =

Business jet aircraft

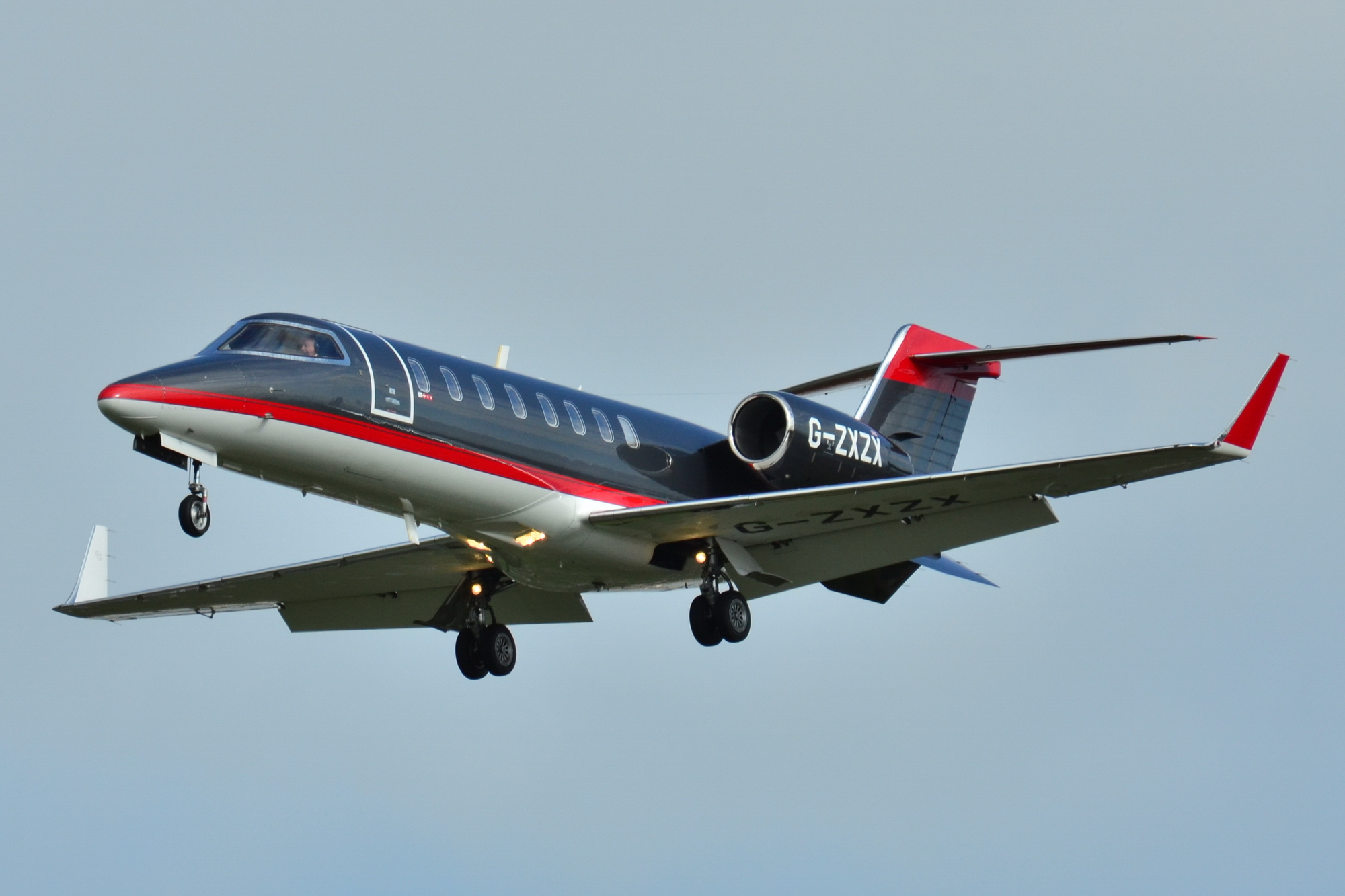

General information
- Type: Business jet
- National origin: Canada/United States
- Manufacturer: Bombardier Aerospace
- Status: Active
- Number built: 642

History
- Manufactured: 1995–2012
- Introduction date: Mid-1998
- First flight: 7 October 1995
- Developed into: Learjet 40; Learjet 70/75

The Learjet 45 (LJ45) is a mid-size business jet aircraft produced by the Learjet Division of Bombardier Aerospace.

The Model 45 was the first all-new design since the original Learjet, and significantly altered the Learjet line. Through its four primary variants – the original Model 45, the Model 45XR, Model 40 and Model 40XR – it was the Learjet Division's principal product from the 1990s until the introduction of the Model 75 variant in 2012.

== History ==
=== Development and production ===
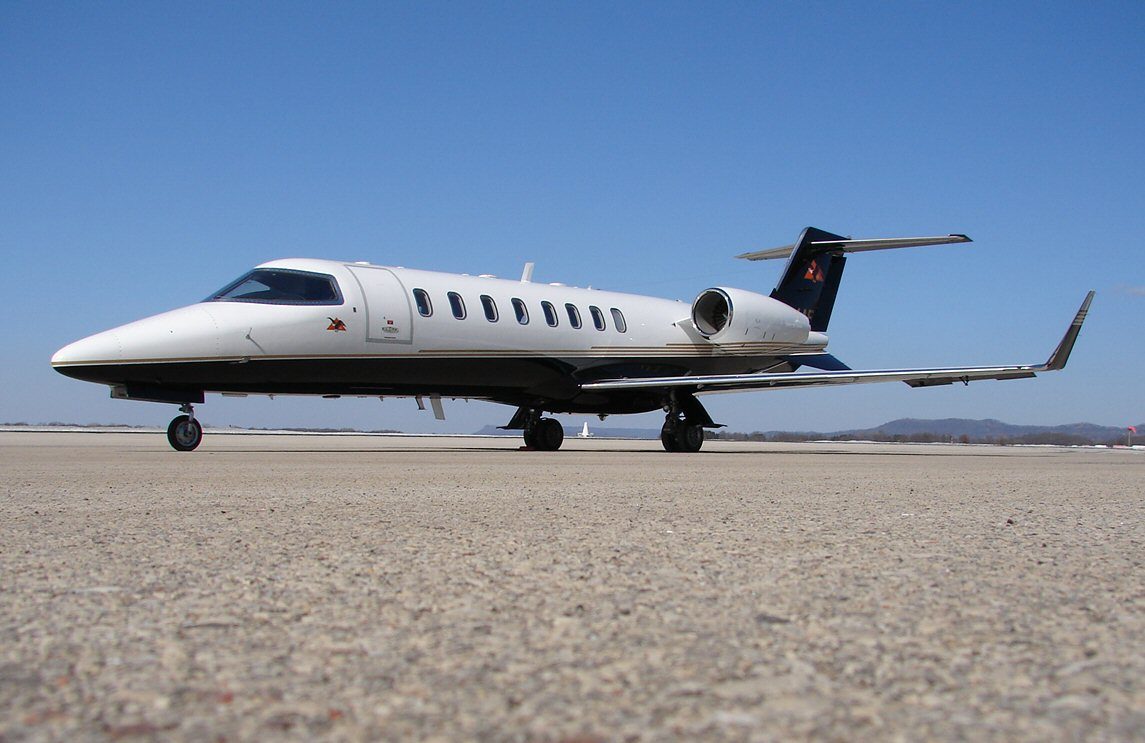
On ground

The Model 45 was developed in the 1990s as a competitor in the "super-light" business jet category, a rival to the popular Cessna Citation Excel / XLS – but sacrificing the Cessna's stand-up room for the Learjet family's traditional high-speed performance.

The Model 45 was Learjet's first completely new ("clean sheet") design since the company's first aircraft (all other models having been evolved from the original 1963 Learjet design, the Model 23). The Model 45 was developed to make Learjets fundamentally more competitive against newer designs from competing manufacturers. But, as a clean-sheet design (starting from scratch), being built to more rigorous (FAR Part 25) rules than previous Learjets, the aircraft's development took substantially longer than that of previous Learjet models.

The development of the LJ45 began in 1989, but was not announced by Bombardier until September, 1992. First flight of the prototype aircraft took place on October 7, 1995 – the 32nd anniversary of the first flight of the original Learjet 23. FAA certification was delayed, and finally granted in September 1997, with the first customer aircraft subsequently delivered in mid-1998. The aviation magazine Flying reported that the Lear 45 was first certified under FAR Part 25 (transport category rules) in 1998.

Initially, delays in production resulted in frustrated customers and lost or delayed revenues. Some customers' orders were delayed more than two years.

=== Deliveries and difficulties ===
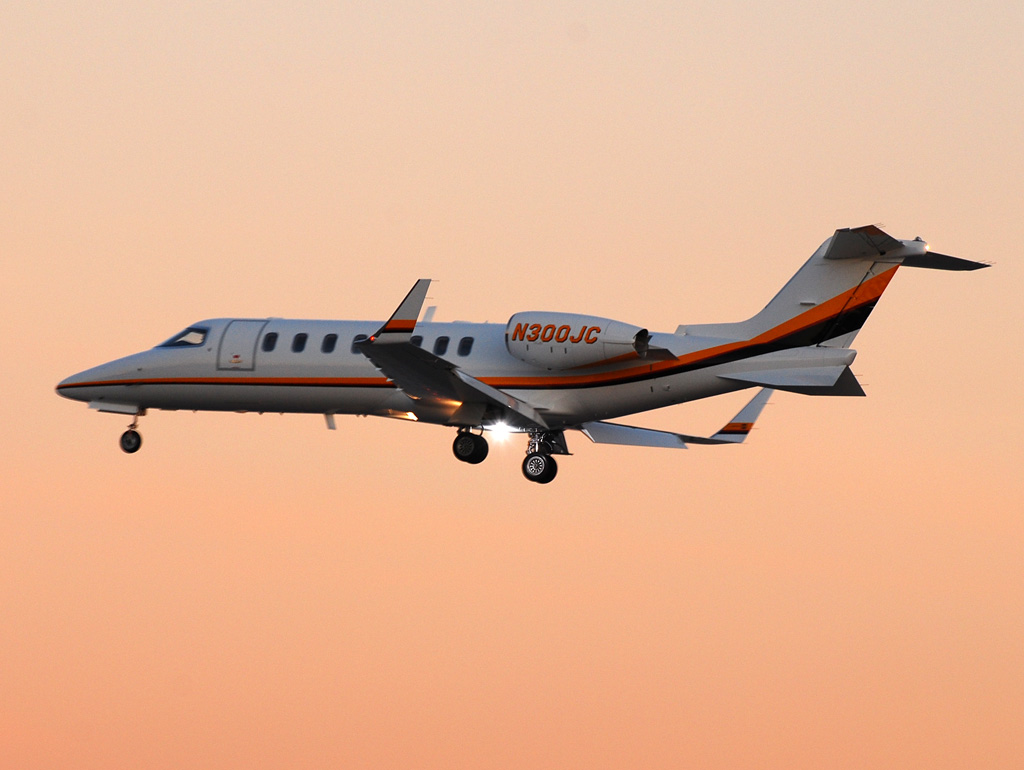
In flight

By late 2006, Learjet had delivered over 300 Model 45s (40 of which were its improved version, the Model 45XR). By November 2010, over 500 of the Model 45 and 45XR had been delivered.

Initially, numerous mechanical and electrical problems began appearing in the aircraft after delivery – including cracked windshields, problems with pressurization, fried power distribution panels, and inappropriate alarms. These and other problems commonly forced Model 45 operators to ground their aircraft about once a month, limiting their use.

Problems came to a head in August 2003, when the FAA discovered a defective fastener for the Model 45's horizontal stabilizer could break, sending the airplane into a fatal dive. The FAA grounded all Learjet 45s, across the nation, and they all sat on the ground for a month, while the manufacturer struggled to develop a fix and get it to aircraft in the field.

By 2007, Model 45 operators were said to have a "love-hate" relationship with the aircraft – appreciating its exceptional combination of performance, payload and economics, but frustrated by frequent maintenance problems, often grounding the aircraft, and difficulty getting prompt and adequate product support and parts. However, 10 years later, a 2017 "Used Aircraft Report" by Business & Commercial Aviation magazine indicated that owners now regard the aircraft as "gas-and-go airplane" and credit it "with great reliability," and the article's author, B/CA senior editor Fred George, describes it as "a rock-solid reliable workhorse."

By 2018, Learjet 45/45XRs were priced at $1.5–4.9 million.

== Design and manufacturing ==
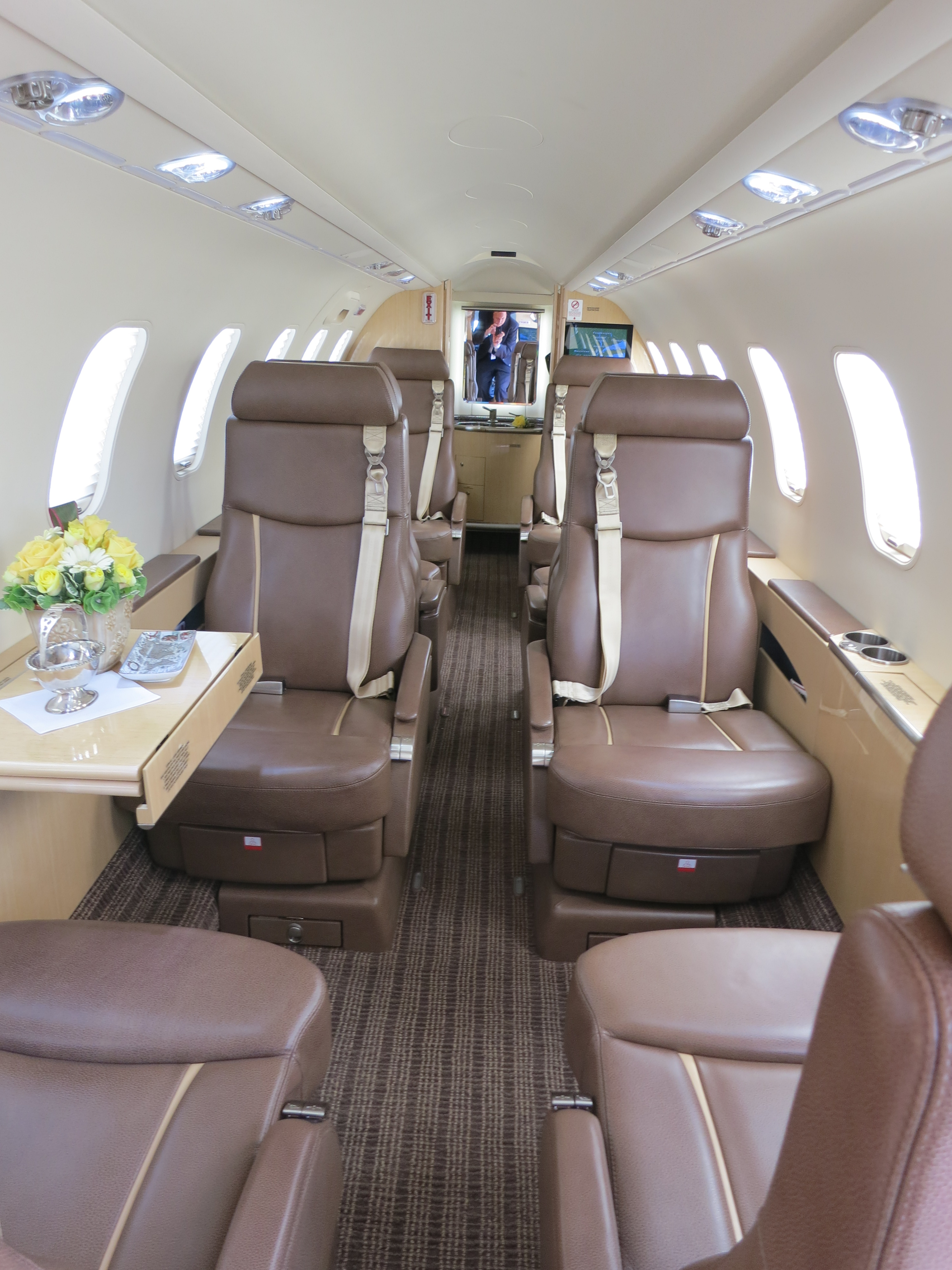
Flat-floor cabin

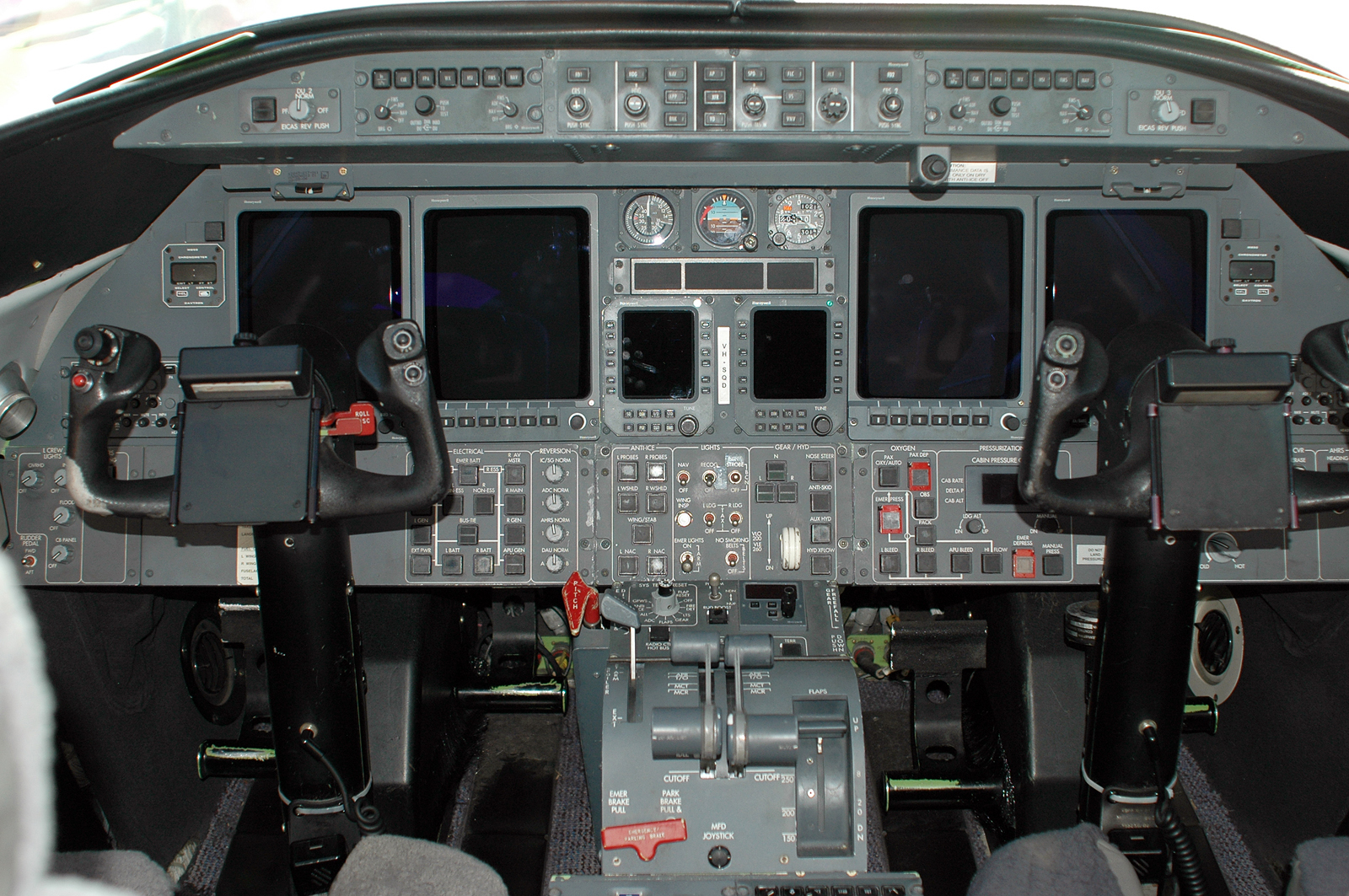
Flight deck

In size, the LJ45 and LJ45XR fit between the smaller Learjet 31 and Learjet 40, at the low end, and the larger Learjet 60 at the top of the Learjet product line. It offers the operating economics typical of a "light" business jet, but the performance and comfort of a "mid-size" business jet.

It has a 1,971-nautical-mile (3,650 km; 2,268 mi) range at Mach 0.81 with four passengers on board.

The plane was designed around a flat-floor cabin, with a non-circular cross-section for additional headroom. Typical interior configuration is eight passenger seats, in a double-club seating arrangement, and a fully enclosed toilet (usable as a 9th seat) and an adjoining 15-cubic-foot baggage area. An external 50-cubic-foot baggage area is also provided.

The Model 45 was Learjet's first "clean-sheet" (all-new) design since the development of the original Model 23. (All previous models had been derivatives of the Model 23, with the wide-fuselage Model 55 and Model 60 utilizing the basic wing design originating in the Model 23, but with extensions and winglets; some, however, view the Model 55 as a "clean sheet" design, also.)

Previous Learjet designs had used rigorous, extensive "fail-safe" structures in the wing and tail assemblies, with numerous wing spars providing a highly reinforced structure (derived from the Swiss-designed P-16 prototype fighter that was the original basis for the first Learjet) – but the Model 45, instead, used a lighter, less-robust structure, affording less cost in manufacture and lower aircraft empty weights, resulting in improved capacity, efficiency and some performance enhancement (for a given amount of engine power), at a competitive price.

Outwardly, however, the Model 45 retained the traditional Learjet appearance, with its semi-swept wing, T-tail, sharp nose, and wrap-around windshield – while using engines and avionics similar to those in the Model 60.

It also incorporated two conspicuous modifications pioneered on earlier Learjets: the "delta fins" (twin ventral fins, positioned to help stabilize the aircraft in flight, and help right the aircraft in a deep aerodynamic stall) – and winglets (upturned wingtips to reduce induced drag and improve stability). Among other characteristics, the design has reportedly yielded the most benign stall characteristics of any "light" business jet to date (as of 2017).

The Model 45 cockpit is equipped with a four-screen Honeywell Primus 1000 EFIS avionics system, but it uses obsolete CRT screens, rather than modern LCD screens, in resulting substantial maintenance costs (though a $300,000 LCD-display upgrade is available).

The aircraft is powered by two DEEC-controlled Honeywell TFE731-20-AR turbofan engines, rated at 3,500 pounds thrust, each, in sea-level temperatures up to 88 °F – a fuel-efficient, "understressed," derated version of the 4,435 lb thrust TFE731-40 – developed specifically for the Learjet 45. Recommended engine TBO (time between overhauls) is 5,000 hours.

At normal atmospheric conditions, zero-wind takeoff runway requirements range from 4,200 feet (for a stripped, basic plane with a basic operating weight of 11,700 pounds) to 5,040 feet for a fully equipped model, with auxiliary power unit and other upgrades (14,200 lbs).

However, the engine exhibits poor performance in high-density altitude situations (such as takeoff from hot, humid or high-elevation airports), often resulting in long runway requirements. (Engine power deficiency in high-density altitudes was largely resolved by the engine upgrade to the -20BR engine variant in the Learjet 45XR variant of the Learjet 45 – an engine upgrade which is also available as a retrofit to the older Learjet 45, and widely recommended.)

An internal auxiliary power unit, for ground use, provides electrical and pneumatic power, permits easy starts, without ground power units, and enables aircraft cooling or heating while on the ground, without the engines operating. However, the auxiliary power unit was initially optional, rather than standard, equipment.

The wing has 13 degrees of wing sweep with a supercritical airfoil optimized for cruise flight at Mach 0.78. Though there are no leading-edge slats or wing fences, the wing has vortilons on the leading edge, to avoid spanwise flow, and small metal triangles on the leading edge to minimize airflow separation during flight at a high angle of attack.

The Lear 45 was certified under FAR Part 25 (transport category rules), rather than FAR Part 23 (often used in earlier business jets). The stricter Part 25 certification requires greater system redundancy, and requires that the airplane reliably meets the performance numbers published in the aircraft's FAA-approved Pilot's Operating Handbook (POH).

Dual-wheel, trailing link, main landing gear is provided, with digital nosewheel steering facilitating tight turns. Single-point pressure refueling is also provided, expediting turnarounds.

De Havilland Canada builds the LJ45's wings, and Bombardier subsidiary Short Brothers of Belfast, Northern Ireland, builds the fuselage and empennage.

== Variants ==
=== Model 45XR ===
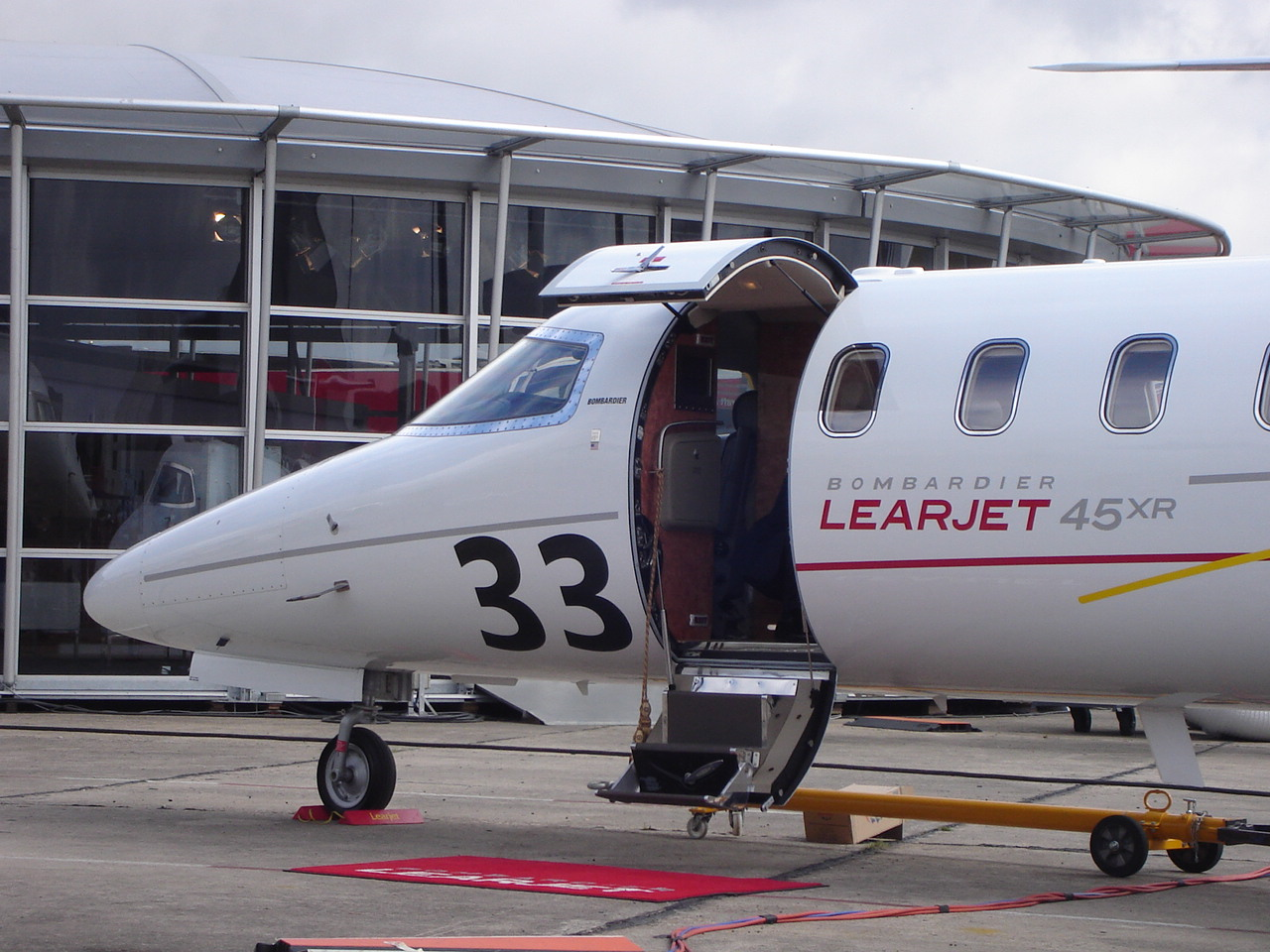
Learjet 45XR at the 2007 Paris Air Show

The Learjet 45XR is an upgraded version of the Model 45, introduced in June 2004, offering substantially higher takeoff weights, faster cruise speeds and faster time-to-climb rates than the Model 45, chiefly through modifications to the engine.

The XR allowed a gross weight 1,000 pounds greater than the original Model 45, greatly increasing payload and fuel/range options. The aircraft also has exceptionally short runway requirements for mid-size bizjets, capable of loaded flights from 4,000-foot runways.

The 45XR's performance and specifications increases are due to the upgrading of the engines to the TFE731-20BR configuration, flat-rated to 3,500 pounds thrust, even at 104 degrees Fahrenheit, well above the 88-degree mark for that power from the original Model 45's TFE731-20 engines.

The Model 45 cockpit is equipped with a four-screen Honeywell Primus 1000 EFIS avionics system, with TCAS and EGPWS.

LJ45 owners can upgrade their aircraft through the incorporation of several service bulletins.

=== Model 40 ===
The Model 40, first delivered in 2003, is a two-foot (24.5 inches) shorter variant of the Model 45, with less passenger room, but otherwise comparable characteristics and performance data. The model 40 also lacked an auxiliary power unit.

=== Model 40XR ===
The Model 40XR, introduced in 2004, is a higher-performance variant of the Model 40, with the same modifications as used to convert the Model 45 into the Model 45XR.

=== Model 75 ===
The Learjet Model 75 variant, first delivered in 2012, is essentially a Model 45XR with more modern engines, engine systems, and Garmin 5000 avionics, and more efficient winglets.

The Model 75's Honeywell TFE731-40BR engines yield 10% more takeoff thrust (3,850 pounds) than the -20BR engines powering the Model 45XR, cutting required runway length 12%, allowing a sea-level, standard-day takeoff within 4,440 ft., (versus the Model 45XR's fully equipped need for 5,040 ft). In these conditions, the Model 75 can take off from a 4,500-foot runway, with a full load of passengers and fuel, and fly 1,800 nautical miles (2,070 statute miles).

As with the original Model 45, the Model 75 was initially delivered in a stripped-down form, with many features only offered as options, rather than as standard equipment). However, the aircraft does come equipped with an auxiliary power unit, and thrust reversers (rare in light business jets). Early units had minor quality problems and defects.

The Model 75 was first FAA-certified in 2013, and took the place of the Model 45XR, becoming the division's principal product. Since 2015 (as of 2017), it is the division's only product.

=== Model 70 ===
The Model 70, introduced in 2013, is a shortened variant of the Model 75 – alternatively described as an upgraded Model 40XR, with the same modifications as used to convert the Model 45XR into the Model 75. It was far less popular than the Model 75, and was dropped from the Learjet line in 2015.

== Accidents and incidents ==
- October 27, 1998, N454LJ was destroyed after loss of control during a landing roll and collision with a ground vehicle at the NASA Wallops Flight Facility, Wallops Island, Virginia. The plane was conducting water ingestion tests for a Goodyear nose wheel tire. The copilot and the flight test engineer received minor injuries.
- August 2003, a defective fastener for the Model 45's horizontal stabilizer failed in flight, creating the risk of a crash, which was averted. This event led to the FAA issuing an Airworthiness Directive grounding all Learjet 45s, nationwide, for a month, while the manufacturer developed a fix and got it out to aircraft in the field.
- June 1, 2003, approximately 1426 local time, a Learjet 45, registration number I-ERJC, operated by Eurojet Italia, crashed shortly after take-off from Linate Airport in Milan, Italy. The airplane reportedly struck a flock of birds shortly after takeoff and crashed into an industrial building while attempting to return to airport. The two crew members aboard received fatal injuries.
- On November 4, 2008, Mexican Interior Minister Juan Camilo Mouriño, Assistant Attorney General José Luis Santiago Vasconcelos and seven others were killed in an accident involving a Learjet 45. The aircraft crashed on a busy road, killing another seven people on the ground. Investigators determined that the pilots had been flying too close to a Boeing 767 and lost control after flying into the larger plane's wake turbulence.
- On February 21, 2021, a Learjet 45XR operated by the Mexican Air Force crashed while taking off from El Lencero Airport in Veracruz, killing all six people on board.
- On January 28, 2026, a Learjet 45XR aircraft with registration VT-SSK was carrying Ajit Pawar, the Deputy Chief Minister Of Maharashtra, India, when it veered off the runway at Baramati Airport leading to a fatal crash that killed him and four others on board.

== Operators ==
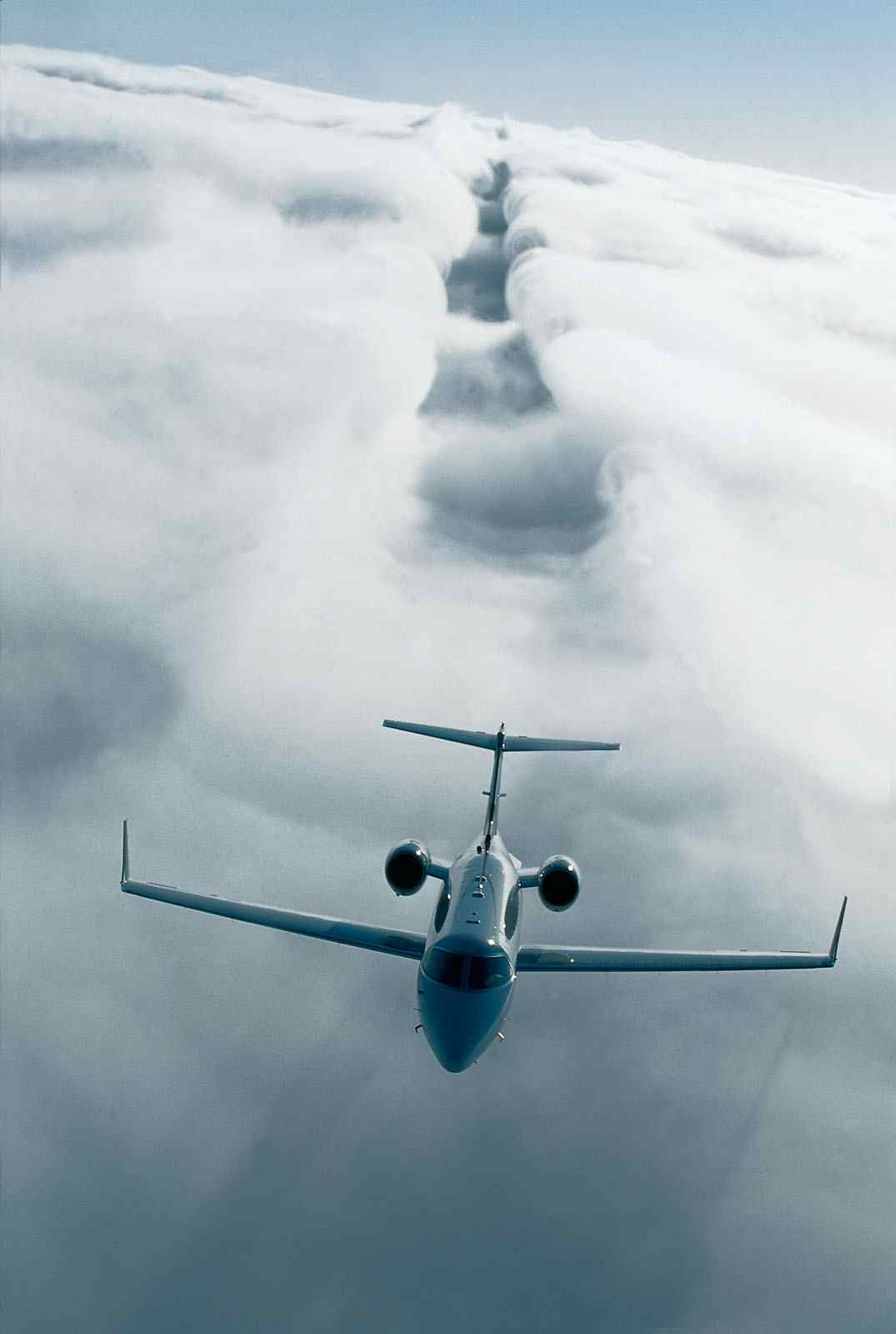
Irish Air Corps

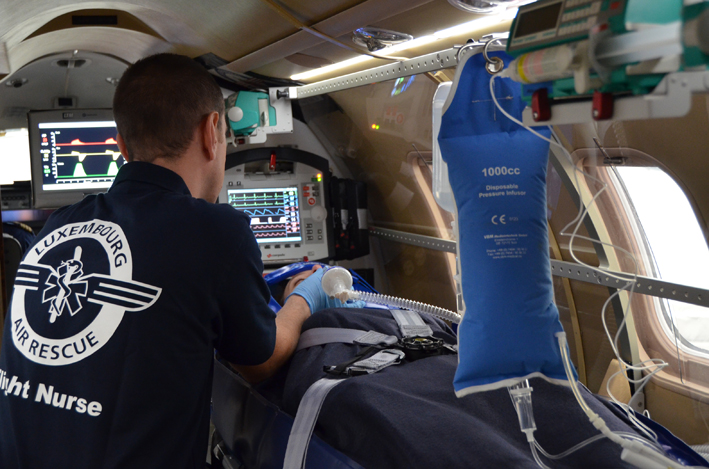
Air ambulance interior

=== Military operators ===
==== Current ====
Peru

- Peru Air Force

Oman

- Military Technical College MTC

==== Former ====
Ireland

- Irish Air Corps 1 aircraft. Retired 2026.

=== Civilian operators ===
Argentina

- Santiago del Estero Government

Austria

- Tyrolean Jet Services

El Salvador

- Government of El Salvador

Ireland

- Ryanair

Italy

- Avionord
- Eurofly Service
- Sirio

Norway

- Airwing AS

Morocco

- Medi Business Jet

Mexico

- FlyMex

Montenegro

- Government of Montenegro

Pakistan

- Government of Sindh
- Government of Balochistan

Luxembourg

- Luxembourg Air Ambulance

United Kingdom

- Gama
- Zenith Aviation UK Ltd

Turkey

- Redstar Aviation :3 Model 45XRs and 2 Model 45

== Specifications ==
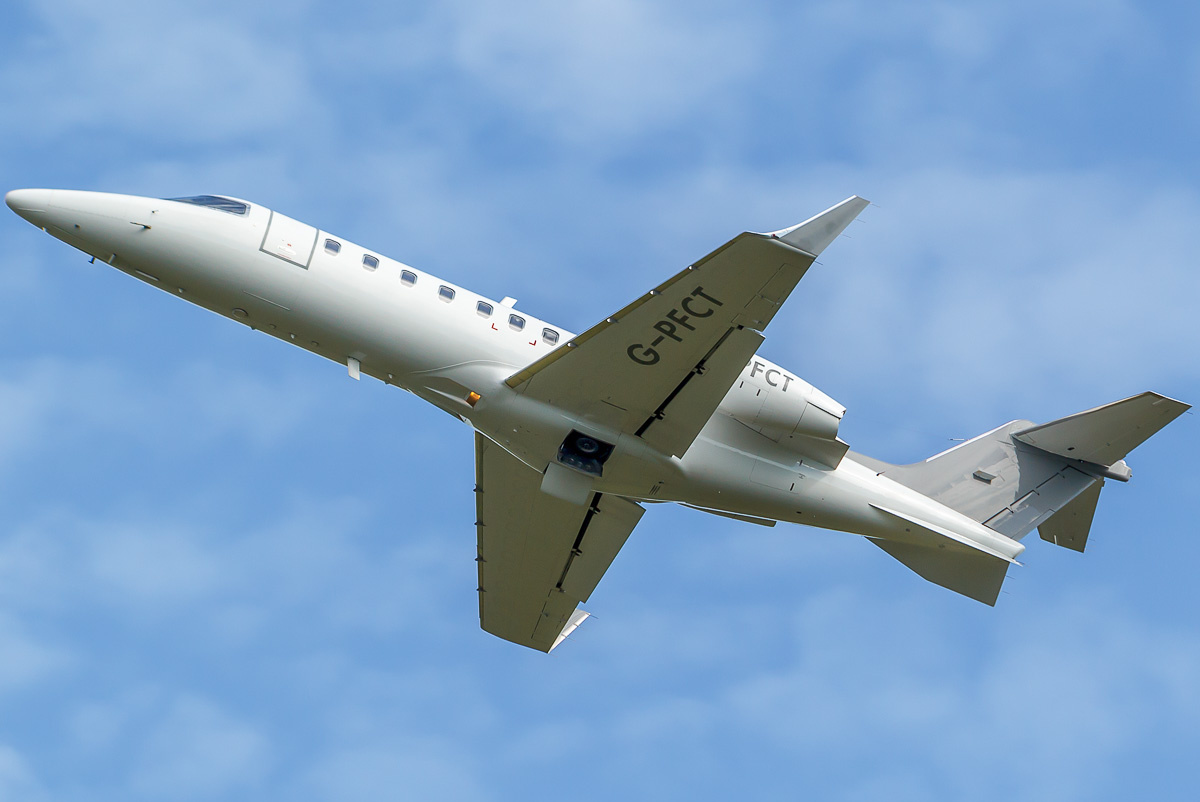
A Learjet 45

Data from Brassey's World Aircraft & Systems Directory 1999/2000

General characteristics

- Crew: 2
- Capacity: 9 passengers
- Length: 58 ft 0 in (17.68 m)
- Wingspan: 47 ft 10 in (14.58 m)
- Height: 14 ft 1 in (4.30 m)
- Wing area: 311.6 sq ft (28.95 m^{2})
- Empty weight: 12,850 lb (5,829 kg)
- Max takeoff weight: 21,500 lb (9,752 kg)
- Powerplant: 2 × Honeywell TFE731-20 turbofan, 3,650 lbf (16.2 kN) thrust each

Performance

- Maximum speed: 533 mph (858 km/h, 463 kn) (max cruise)
- Cruise speed: 510 mph (804 km/h, 445 kn)
- Range: 1,968 mi (3,167 km, 1,710 nmi) (4 passengers)
- Service ceiling: 51,000 ft (15,545 m)

== See also ==
Aircraft of comparable role, configuration, and era

- Cessna Citation III / Cessna Citation VII
- Embraer Phenom 300
- Embraer Legacy 450/500 and Praetor 500/600
- Gulfstream G100
- Hawker 800XP
- Pilatus PC-24
