= Tyrolean Jet Services =

Austrian airline

Tyrolean Jets & Services (TJS)

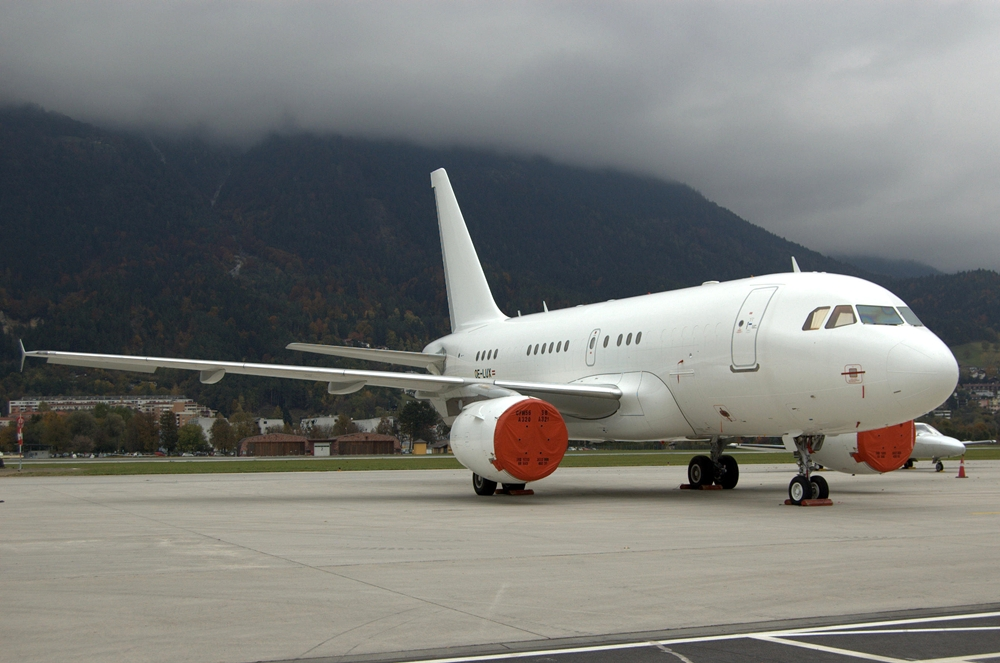
- Airbus A318CJ
IATA	ICAO	Call sign
–	TJS	TYROLJET
- Founded: 1978; 48 years ago
- Fleet size: 10
- Destinations: national and international
- Headquarters: Innsbruck, Austria
- Key people: Martin Lener (Managing Director); Capt. Karl Koidl (Flight Operations Manager)
- Website: www.tjs.at

Tyrolean Jets & Services (TJS) was established in 1978 as Austria's first executive air concern, operating business jets and managing jets for Swarovski's Corporate Flight Department and for clients in the worldwide air charter market.

== History ==
The company was founded in 1958 as Aircraft Innsbruck, by Christian Schwemberger-Swarovski and Gernot Langes-Swarovski. The division operated business flights. At this time Innsbruck operated scheduled services to Zurich only.

In 1978, the company was renamed and restructured as Tyrolean Airways, combining airline, air ambulance and business travel operations.

In April 1980, a de Havilland Canada Dash 7 flew the first scheduled flight from Innsbruck to Vienna and Zurich under Tyrolean Airways brand. In the first operational year 38,500 passengers were flown, which justified the purchase of a second aircraft, delivered in May 1981. In 1985 Tyrolean Airways operated a twin-engine de Havilland Canada Dash 8 with 37 seats and the company was renamed Tyrolean Jet Service.

Tyrolean Air Ambulance was divided into Tyrol Air Ambulance and the helicopter division Heliair was split off.

In 1988 Tyrolean became a public company and Leipnik Lundenburger AG acquired a 25% shareolding. ÖAMTC acquired Heliair and in 1995, Austrian Airlines acquired all the scheduled flight operations. Thereafter TJS focused exclusively on business travel.

== Fleet ==
As of 2010, the Tyrolean Jet Services fleet consists of the following aircraft:

- 1 Bombardier Global Express
- 1 Beechcraft B200GT King Air
- 2 Cessna Citation VII
- 1 Embraer Phenom 300
- 1 Gulfstream G550
- 1 Learjet 45
