= Bombardier Aviation =

Canadian aerospace manufacturer

- Type: Division
- Industry: Aerospace
- Predecessor: Canadair
- Founded: 1989; 37 years ago
- Headquarters: Dorval, Quebec, Canada
- Area served: Worldwide
- Products: Challenger 3500; Challenger 650; Global 5500 and 6500; Global 7500 and 8000
- Parent: Bombardier Inc.
- Website: bombardier.com/aircraft

Bombardier Aviation, a division of Bombardier Inc., is headquartered in Dorval, Quebec, Canada. The company currently produces the Global and Challenger series of business jets.

At its peak, Bombardier operated manufacturing plants in 27 countries and employed over 70,000 workers. However, under financial pressure, it significantly reduced its workforce and divested its entire commercial aircraft portfolio including the Q-Series regional turboprop, CRJ-Series of regional jets, and the C-Series narrowbody jet.

== History ==
=== Early activities ===
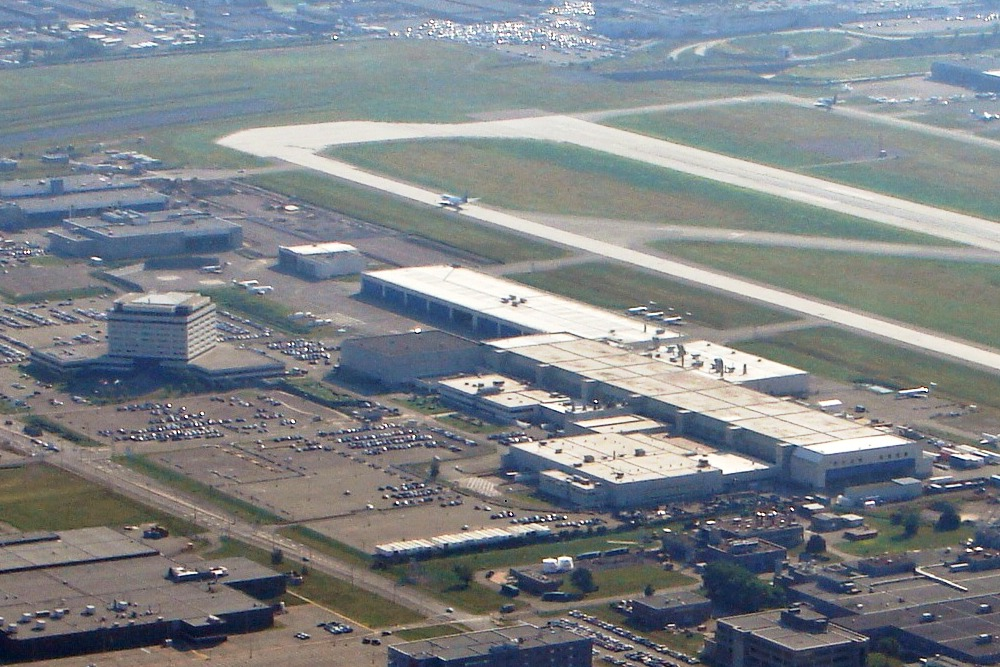
Main engineering building and assembly plant of Bombardier Aviation at Montréal–Pierre Elliott Trudeau International Airport

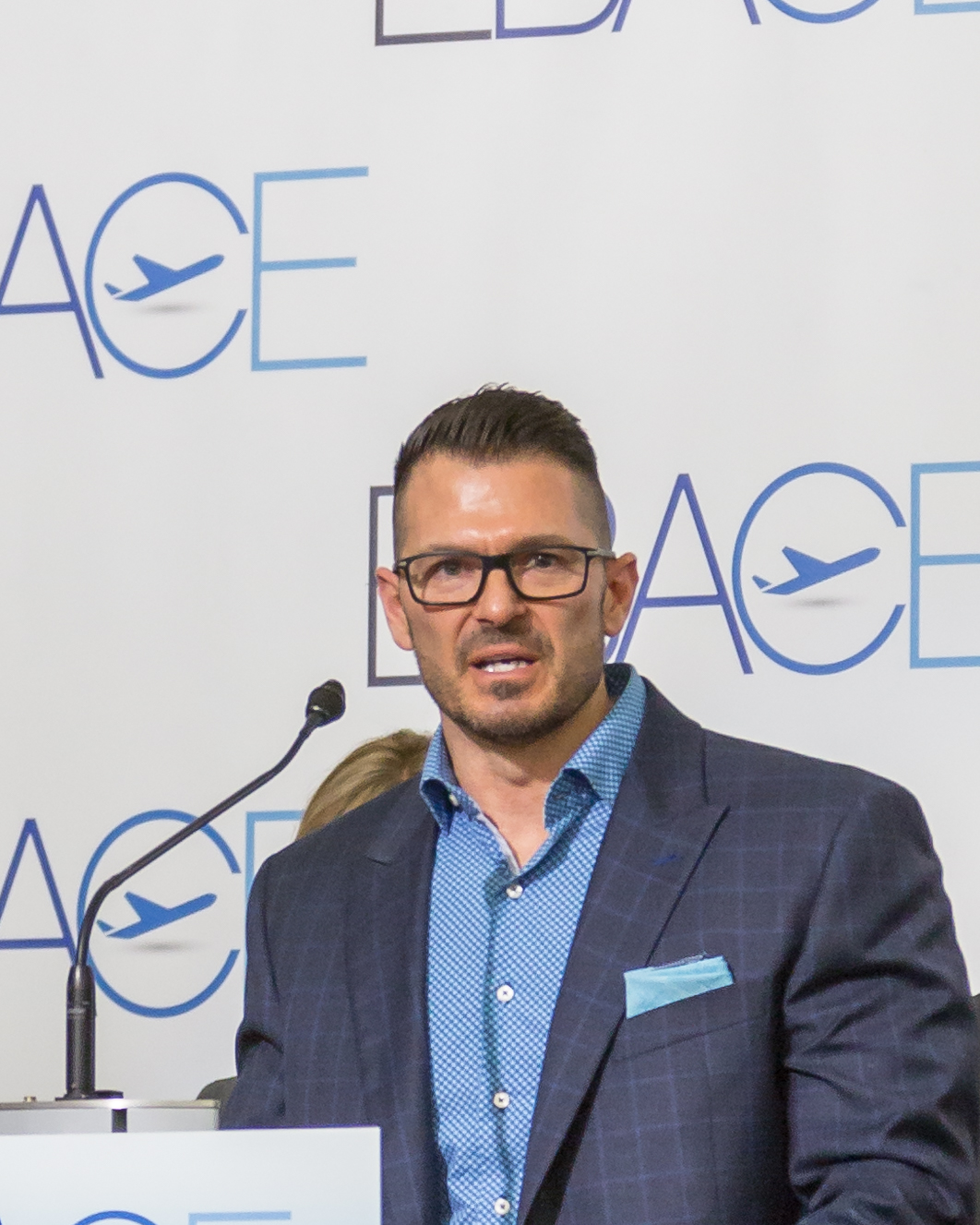
David Coleal, former president for Business Aircraft

Bombardier acquired the state-owned Canadair from the government of Canada in 1986 and restored it to profitability. Canadair had been nationalized in 1976.

In 1989, Bombardier acquired the near-bankrupt Short Brothers aircraft manufacturing company in Belfast, Northern Ireland. This was followed in 1990 by the acquisition of the bankrupt American company Learjet, a manufacturer of business jets headquartered in Wichita, Kansas. A third major aircraft manufacturer acquisition was the money-losing Boeing subsidiary, de Havilland Aircraft of Canada based in Toronto, Ontario, acquired in 1992. Canadair, Learjet and Short Brothers cost US$215 million to acquire and produced revenues of US$1.3 billion in 1990. The sales of Canadair commuter jets and airborne surveillance systems, Learjet business aircraft and Short Brothers C-23 Sherpa cargo planes were growing at that time.

The aerospace company accounted for over half of Bombardier Inc.'s revenue. By the start of the 2010s, its most popular aircraft included its Dash 8 Series 400, CRJ100/200/440, and CRJ700/900/1000 lines of regional airliners although the company was devoting most of its Research and Development budget to the newer CSeries. It also manufactured the Bombardier 415 amphibious water-bomber (in Dorval and North Bay), and the Global Express and the Challenger lines of business jets.

The CSeries, which Bombardier offered in several size versions, initially competed with the Airbus A318 and Airbus A319; the Boeing 737 Next Generation 737-600 and 737-700 models; and the Embraer 195. Bombardier claimed the CSeries would burn 20% less fuel per trip than these competitors, which would make it still about 8% more fuel efficient than the Boeing 737 MAX, which was introduced in 2017.

In 2008, the launch customer for the CSeries, Lufthansa, signed a letter of intent for up to 60 aircraft and 30 options. The Montreal manufacturing complex was redeveloped by Ghafari Associates to incorporate lean manufacturing for the CSeries.

=== 2010–2016 ===
On 24 March 2011, Shanghai-based Commercial Aircraft Corporation of China (COMAC) and Bombardier Inc. signed a framework agreement for a long-term strategic cooperation on commercial aircraft. The intention was to break the near-duopoly of Airbus and Boeing. Aircraft covered by the programme included the Bombardier CRJ-series, CSeries and Q-series; and the Comac ARJ21 and Comac C919. In January 2012, the firm began manufacturing simple structures, such as flight controls for the CRJ series, from its first facility in Africa, near Casablanca, Morocco. On 30 September 2013, it broke ground on its permanent facility, due to open late 2014. In October, a joint development deal between Bombardier and a South Korean consortium consisting of Korea Aerospace Industries and Korean Air Lines was revealed, to develop a 90-seater turboprop regional airliner, targeting a 2019 launch date.

In November 2012, Bombardier signed the largest deal in its history with Swiss business jet operator VistaJet for 56 Global series jets for a total value of $3.1 billion, including an option for an additional 86 jets, for a total transaction value of $7.8 billion. In April 2013, Canada's Porter Airlines placed a conditional order for 12 CSeries aircraft, with options for another 18; this was conditional on jets being allowed to use Billy Bishop Toronto City Airport off downtown Toronto. In 2015, the Canadian Government announced that it would not approve the marine expansion of the runway required for the use of jets at the airport and the proposal was shelved.

In January 2014, 1,700 employees were cut from Bombardier Aerospace due to a 19 percent drop in orders in 2013. In July of that year, Bombardier reorganized itself in response to underperformance; President Guy Hachey retired and Bombardier Aerospace was split into three divisions: business aircraft; commercial aircraft and aerostructures; and engineering services, while 1,800 jobs were cut. In its 2014-year end statement, Bombardier Aerospace reported its employee count had reduced by 3,700, delivered 290 aircraft and held orders for 282 more; and also claimed "strong long-term potential". On 29 October 2015, Bombardier announced a US$4.9-billion third-quarter loss and $3.2 billion writedown on the CSeries. It also cancelled its Learjet 85 program, taking another US$1.2-billion writedown and cancelling 64 outstanding orders. The firm's debt reached approximately $9 billion, largely due to the CSeries, which had not recorded a single firm order since September 2014. Bombardier shares fell 17.4 per cent on that day. By 21 December 2015, the firm had 243 firm orders for the CSeries; a US$2.5 billion cash infusion – $1 billion from the provincial government plus a $1.5 billion investment from the Caisse de dépôts et placements du Québec – was keeping the parent company adequately funded.

On 17 February 2016, Bombardier announced its 2015 profits were $138 million before taking a $5.4 billion write-down; it also announced 7,000 jobs would be cut. After a long and expensive development, costing US$5.4 billion to date, including a US$3.2 billion writeoff, the small (110–125 seat) CS100 version of the CSeries received initial type certification from Transport Canada on 18 December 2015. At the time, the company had 243 firm orders and letters of intent and commitment for another 360. Most orders were for the CS300 model. The first CS100 was expected to be flying by mid-2016 in Lufthansa colours. "Certification is a great thing, but 2016 is going to be critical for orders," analyst Chris Murray, a managing director with Alta Corp, told Bloomberg Business. Fred Cromer, president of Bombardier's commercial aircraft unit, hinted on 21 December 2015 that price cuts or other incentives may be offered to bolster sales (list price for the CS100 was US$71.8 million and for the CS300 US$82 million).

Intending to boost profit margins, Bombardier announced on 12 January 2016 that it would cancel deals with third party sales agent Tag Aeronautics, as well as cancelling 24 firm and 30 optional orders, aiming to later resell these aircraft without a sales agency fee. The CSeries was adversely hit by production delays and stiff competition in 2016. On 20 January, United Continental Holdings Inc. announced that it had ordered 40 Boeing 737-700s instead. Air Canada announced it would buy up to 75 CS300s, a larger variant, on 17 February 2016; prior to this, there had been no CSeries orders since 2014. The CSeries program was forecast to have positive cash flow after delivering approximately 200 aircraft. David Tyerman, an analyst with Canaccord Genuity, commented on the difficulty of winning orders and questioned how profitable the next CSeries order will be. According to Bjorn Fehrm of the aviation consulting firm Leeham Company, the first 15 CSeries built in 2016 each cost $60 million to make, but would sell for only $30 million.

In April 2016 Delta Air Lines placed an order for 75 CS100 models with an option for 50 additional aircraft. At full list price, the deal would total US$5.6 billion but sources claimed that Delta had received a significant discount. Air Canada firmed up its tentative order for 45 CS300s with an option for another 30 in June 2016; it was reportedly valued at $3.8 billion, increasing to $6.3 billion if the option was exercised (based on the aircraft's list price). The next day, Bombardier delivered the first CSeries jet to Swiss International Air Lines, the first operator to start flying them.

=== Government subsidy controversies ===
==== Embraer ====
Brazil and Canada engaged in an international, adjudicated trade dispute over government subsidies to domestic aircraft manufacturers in the late 1990s and early 2000s. The World Trade Organization decided that Brazil ran an illegal subsidy program, Proex, benefiting Brazilian manufacturer Embraer from at least 1999–2000; and that Canada illegally subsidized its indigenous regional airliner industry.

In late September 2017, the World Trade Organization announced that it would consider Brazil's complaint filed in February, including allegations that the Canadian government unfairly subsidized the CSeries. Embraer claimed that the subsidies are an "unsustainable practice that distorts the entire global market, harming competitors at the expense of Canadian taxpayers."

==== Boeing ====
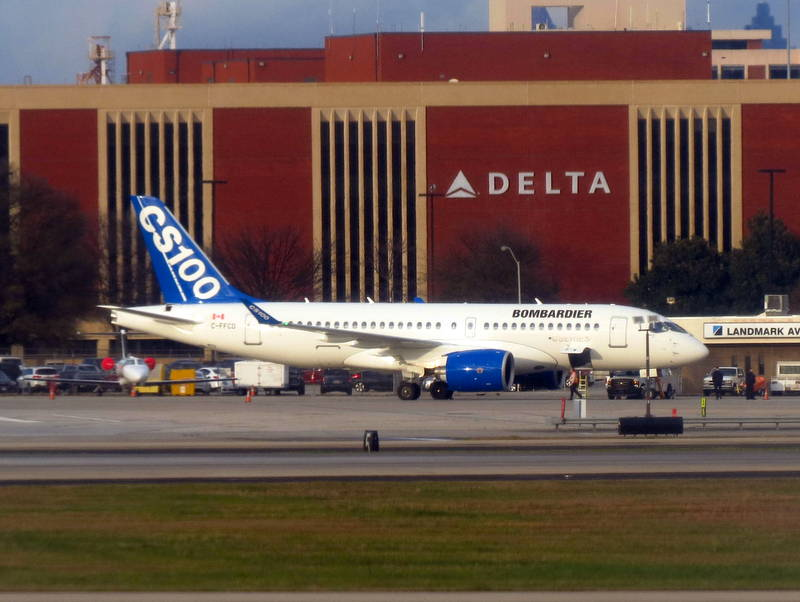
The CSeries CS100 demonstrated for Delta Air Lines in Atlanta

On 28 April 2016, Bombardier Aerospace recorded a firm order from Delta Air Lines for 75 CSeries CS100s plus 50 options. On 27 April 2017, The Boeing Company filed a petition for dumping them at $19.6m each, below their $33.2m production cost. On the same day, both Bombardier and the government of Canada rejected Boeing's claim, vowing to mount a "vigorous defence".

On 9 June 2017, the US International Trade Commission (USITC) found that the US industry could be threatened and should be protected. On 26 September, after lobbying by Boeing, the US Department of Commerce (DoC) alleged subsidies of 220% and intended to collect deposits accordingly, plus a preliminary 80% anti-dumping duty, resulting in a duty of 300%. The DoC announced its final ruling, a total duty of 292%, on 20 December, hailing it as an affirmation of the "America First" policy. In October, with financial issues already mounting, Bombardier was indirectly forced by the US government tariffs to relinquish 50.01% of its stake in the CSeries program to Airbus for a symbolic CAD$1, and would produce CSeries aircraft in the United States.

On 10 January 2018, Canada formally filed a complaint at the World Trade Organization (WTO) against the United States over the affair. On 26 January, the four USITC commissioners unanimously reversed their earlier claims, finding that US industry is no longer threatened and no duty orders will be issued, overturning the imposed duties. The Commission public report was made available by February 2018. On March 22, Boeing declined to appeal the ruling.

==== 2015–2017 government assistance ====
On 29 October 2015, the Quebec government announced that it would invest US$1 billion (roughly CAD$1.3 billion) to protect jobs and the CSeries, the province buying a 49.5% interest in the limited partnership controlling the CSeries program. Bombardier had reportedly asked Ottawa for a repayable loan of $350 million, while the province expected the federal government to match its $1 billion loan in return for a near 50 percent stake in the CSeries program. Debts from the project had forced Bombardier to raise cash and seek aid in order to stay afloat. Both provincial and federal contributions came via repayable loans; independent economist Mark Milke claimed it is questionable whether they would be repaid, calling the bailout loans "corporate welfare" in The Globe and Mail.

Days after his swearing-in, on 10 November 2015, Prime Minister Justin Trudeau stated Bombardier must make a "strong business case" for federal aid, agreeing that the firm exemplified important high-value manufacturing, but stated that such aid would be shaped by Canadians' best interests, not on "emotion, politics or symbols". In April 2016, the federal government offered an aid package to Bombardier without disclosing the amount or conditions imposed; it reportedly rejected the offer. An unnamed source advised Reuters that negotiations were still underway. On 14 April 2016, Bombardier shares were at a six-month high over rumors that Delta had ordered CSeries jets. The firm continued to request a $1 billion aid package from the federal government.

In May 2016, the federal government reportedly offered a $1 billion aid package (in addition to the $1 billion subsidy offered by the Government of Quebec) with the condition of Bombardier ending its dual-class share structure which enables the Bombardier and Beaudoin families to control it despite a minority ownership. According to Bloomberg, the talks reached a standstill over this condition. The federal plan also recommended that the firm issue new shares to gain $1 billion in additional funding. The Toronto Star predicted that the government would bailout the firm as bankruptcy would lead to the loss of some 70,000 jobs as well as significant exports, which had totaled $34.2 billion in the previous five years. In May 2016, Federal Finance Minister Bill Morneau said the aerospace sector is "critically important". In February 2017, the federal government agreed to provide $372.5 million in interest-free repayable loans, to be issued in instalments over the following four years; one third was intended for the CSeries while the rest went to the Global 7000 business jet.

=== Airbus partnership ===
On 16 October 2017, Bombardier and Airbus announced a partnership on the CSeries program to expand in an estimated market of more than 6,000 new 100-150 seat aircraft over 20 years; in July 2018, Airbus acquired a 50.01% majority stake in the holding company for the program, Bombardier keeping 31% and Investissement Québec 19%. Under this deal, the CSeries is now marketed as the Airbus A220. Access to Airbus's supply chain expertise was intended to save production costs while the headquarters and primary assembly line remain in Québec, with a second assembly line at the Airbus Mobile factory in Alabama, US. Airbus did not pay for its share, nor did it assume any debt. Airbus insisted that it had no plan to buy Bombardier's stake in the program, remaining strategic partners after 2025; clauses allowed it to buy out Quebec's share in 2023 and Bombardier's seven years after the deal closes, though production is required to remain in Quebec until at least 2041. Bombardier CEO Alain Bellemare said the deal would raise sales: "It brings certainty to the future of the program so it increases the level of confidence that the aircraft is there to stay. Combining the CSeries with Airbus's global scale ... will take the CSeries program to new heights".

=== Divestment ===
On 8 November 2018, Viking Air parent Longview Aviation Capital Corp. acquired the Q400 program and the de Havilland brand from Bombardier. Viking had already bought the discontinued de Havilland Canada aircraft type certificates in 2006. At that point, Q400 sales were lower than rival ATR. Bombardier announced the sale was for $300 million and expected $250 million annual savings. The Q400 deal closed on 3 June 2019; the new holding company, De Havilland Aircraft of Canada Limited, inherited an order book of 51 Q400s. Also in late 2018, Bombardier sold its business jet training program to CAE Inc. for $645 million and announced 5,000 job cuts over 18 months across its 70,000 employees worldwide: 500 in Ontario, 2,500 in Quebec and 2,000 outside Canada.

Bombardier shifted focus from commercial to business aircraft, anticipating business jet shipments to increase from 135 in 2018 to 150–155 in 2019, and forecast revenues of $16.5 billion in 2018, rising to over $20 billion in 2020 with a free cash flow of $0.75-1 billion, mostly via the large Global 7500. Business Aircraft revenues were expected to increase from $5 billion for 2018 to $6.25 billion in 2019 and $8.5 billion in 2020 with 180 deliveries, including aftermarket within the 4,700 fleet doubling from the 28% captured in 2015. Aerostructures & Engineering Services were expected to grow from $2 billion in 2018 to $2.25 billion in 2020. Airliner revenues were expected to shrink from $1.7 billion to $1.4 billion in 2019, halving losses to $125 million, with deliveries flat at 35 CRJs and Q400s; it was to be profitable with CRJs only in 2020.

On 2 May 2019, Bombardier's aerospace division was renamed Bombardier Aviation following the divestment of the CSeries and Q400 programmes. On 25 June 2019, Bombardier agreed with Mitsubishi Heavy Industries to sell the CRJ program, a deal was expected to close in early 2020 subject to regulatory approval. Mitsubishi will gain Bombardier's global expertise in terms of engineering, certification, customer relations and support, boosting its SpaceJet (formerly MRJ) programme and enabling its production in North America. The deal includes two service centres in Canada and two in the US, as well as the CRJ's type certificates. Bombardier retains the Mirabel assembly facility and produce the CRJ on behalf of Mitsubishi until the current order backlog is complete. In early May 2020, Mitsubishi confirmed that all conditions had been met. The transaction closed on 1 June. Bombardier's CRJ-related service and support activities were transferred to a new Montreal-based company, MHI RJ Aviation Group.

On 31 October 2019, Bombardier announced the sale of its aerostructures activities and aftermarket services operations in Northern Ireland and Morocco, and its aerostructures maintenance, repair and overhaul (MRO) facility in Dallas, to Spirit AeroSystems. The sale was expected to close in the first half of 2020 subject to regulatory approval. In September 2020 Spirit said "there can be no assurances" that conditions would be met by the 31 October deadline. A last-minute amendment reduced the amount of the cash consideration and adjusted the overall valuation, enabling the parties to set a closing date of 30 October.

On 12 February 2020, Bombardier sold its share in Airbus Canada Limited Partnership, the holding company for the A220 programme, for $591 million; Airbus now has a 75% share, with the remaining 25% owned by Investissement Québec. This sale marked Bombardier's "strategic exit" from the commercial aviation sector.

Despite rumours that its business jet activities might be sold to Textron, parent company of Cessna, Beechcraft and Bell Helicopters, on 17 February it emerged that Bombardier had instead agreed to sell its rail division to Alstom and would focus exclusively on business aviation.

=== Post-pandemic ===
On 1 September 2026, Bombardier announced an agreement to acquire the assets of MHI Canada Aerospace, a Mitsubishi Heavy Industries subsidiary located in Mississauga, Ontario, which supplies wings and center-fuselage structures for the Global 5500 and 6500

== Aircraft ==
=== Current ===
Aircraft	Type	Start	Notes
Challenger 300	Business jet	2004	3500 variant
Challenger 600	Business jet	1980	650 variant
Global Express	Business jet	1998	5500/6500 variants
Global 7500	Business jet	2018	7500/8000 variants

=== Divested ===
Aircraft	Type	Start	Current owner	Notes
Airbus A220	Narrow-body jet	2012	Airbus	Formerly known as the Bombardier C-Series
CRJ700 series	Regional jet	1999	Mitsubishi Aircraft	Production ended
De Havilland Canada Dash 8	Regional turboprop	1983	De Havilland Canada	Formerly known as the Bombardier Q-Series

=== Out of production ===
- Production ended at Bombardier, instead of after divestment

Aircraft	Type	Start	End	Notes
Learjet 35	Business jet	1973	1994	Produced under Bombardier after 1990
Short 330	Regional turboprop	1974	1992	Produced under Bombardier after 1989 Type design since sold to De Havilland Canada/Viking Air
Learjet 55	Business jet	1979	1987	Last produced under ownership by Integrated Acquisition
Short 360	Regional turboprop	1981	1991	Produced under Bombardier after 1989 Type design since sold to De Havilland Canada/Viking Air
Short Tucano	Military trainer	1986	1995	Produced under Bombardier after 1989
CRJ100/200 series	Regional jet	1991	2006	The -440 model is the same airframe as the -200 but certified for maximum of 44 pax.
Learjet 60	Business jet	1991	2012	
Canadair CL-415	Aerial firefighting	1993	2015	Type design since sold to De Havilland Canada, to be succeeded by the DHC-515.
Learjet 45	Business jet	1995	2012	
CL-327	UAV prototype	1996	1996	
Learjet 40	Business jet	2002	2013	
Challenger 850	Business jet	2006	2015	Business jet interior cabin configuration of CRJ100/200 (CL-600-2B19) airframe.
Learjet 70/75	Business jet	2013	2021	
Learjet 85	Business jet	2014	2014	Project cancelled after 2 prototypes built

Challenger 600 based aircraft
Model (engine)	Prod.	Max. pax	Length	Wingspan	Wing area	MTOW	Empty	Max. fuel	Max. PL	Unit thrust	Range
Challenger 650 (2× CF34-3B)	1978 present	19	20.9 m 68 ft 5 in	19.6 m 64 ft 4 in	45.4 m^{2} 489 ft^{2}	21.86 t 48,200 lb	12.32 t 27,150 lb	9.07 t 20,000 lb	2.2 t 4,850 lb	41 kN; 9,220 lbf	7,408 km 4,000 nm
CRJ100/200 (2× CF34-3) (Note: Challenger 850: 19 max pax, 8,289 kg/18,274 lb max fuel, 5,206 km/2,811 nmi range)	1991; 2006	50	26.77 m 87 ft 10 in	21.21 m 69 ft 7 in	48.35 m^{2} 520.4 ft^{2}	24.04 t 53,000 lb	13.84 t 30,500 lb	6.49 t 14,305 lb	6.12 t 13,500 lb	38.84 kN; 8,729 lbf	3,148 km 1,700 nm
Global 6000/Global 6500 (2× BR710/Pearl)	1996 present	13–17	30.3 m 99 ft 5 in	28.7 m 94 ft 0 in	94.8 m^{2} 1,021 ft^{2}	45.13 t 99,500 lb	23.69 t 52,230 lb	20.43 t 45,050 lb	2.62 t 5,770 lb	65.6/67.3 kN; 14,750/15,125 lbf	11,112/12,223 km 6,000/6,600 nm
Global 5000/5500 (2× BR710/Pearl)	2003 present	13–16	29.5 m 96 ft 10 in	28.7 m 94 ft 0 in	94.8 m^{2} 1,021 ft^{2}	41.96 kg 92,500 lb	23.07 t 50,861 lb	17.80 t 39,250 lb	3.24 t 7,139 lb	65.6/67.3 kN; 14,750/15,125 lbf	9,630/10,556 km 5,200/5,700 nmi
CRJ700 (2× CF34-8C5)	1999; 2020	66–78	32.3 m 106 ft 1 in	23.2 m 76 ft 3 in	70.6 m^{2} 760 sq ft	34.02 t 75,000 lb	20.07 t 44,245 lb	8.89 t 19,595 lb	8.19 t 18,055 lb	61.3 kN; 13,790 lbf	2,553 km 1,378 nmi
CRJ900 (2× CF34-8C5)	2002; 2020	76–90	36.2 m 118 ft 11 in	24.9 m 81 ft 7 in	71.1 m^{2} 765 sq ft	38.33 t 84,500 lb	21.85 t 48,160 lb	8.89 t 19,595 lb	10.25 t 22,590 lb	64.5 kN; 14,510 lbf	2,876 km 1,553 nmi
CRJ1000 (2× CF34-8C5)	2011; 2020	97–104	39.1 m 128 ft 5 in	26.2 m 85 ft 11 in	77.4 m^{2} 833 sq ft	41.64 t 91,800 lb	23.19 t 51,120 lb	8.82 t 19,450 lb	11.97 t 26,380 lb	64.5 kN; 14,510 lbf	3,004 km 1,622 nmi
Global 7500 (2× Passport)	2018 present	19	33.8 m 111 ft	31.7 m 104 ft 0 in	120 m^{2} 1,300 sq ft	48.19 t 106,250 lb	25.76 t 56,800 lb	21.52 t 47,450 lb	2.59 t 5,700 lb	83 kN; 18,650 lbf	14,260 km 7,700 nm

== Facilities ==
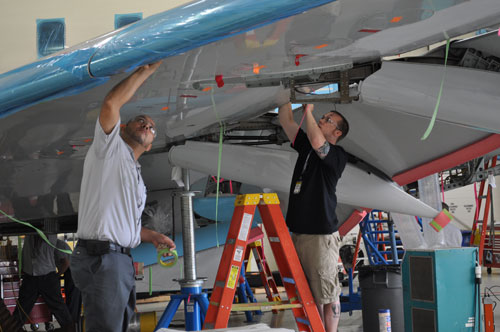
Mechanics working at Bombardier maintenance facility near Dallas, Texas

Bombardier Aviation has several facilities.

=== Facilities history ===
Bombardier Aerospace once had manufacturing, engineering and services facilities in 27 countries. The production facilities are located in Canada, the United States, and Mexico.

On 3 May 2018, Bombardier announced the sale of its Toronto Downsview facility where it manufactures the Global business jet family and the Q400 regional turboprops, for $635 million, leased back for three to five years to maintain Q400 production, while leasing a 38-acre (15 ha) site at Toronto Pearson International Airport to open a final assembly plant for the Global business jets. On 2 May 2019, Bombardier announced that all of its aerospace assets would be consolidated into a "single, streamlined and fully integrated business", resulting in the sale of its operations in Belfast and Morocco.

=== Current facilities ===
==== Canada ====
- Montreal Trudeau International Airport — Headquarters. Challenger 300 and 650 final assembly and flight test. Global family interior completion.
- Saint-Laurent, Quebec — Product Development Centre. Cockpit and aft fuselage manufacturing facility.
- Toronto Pearson International Airport — Global family final assembly

==== Mexico ====
- Querétaro — Aircraft component manufacturing facility for Challenger 605 and Global 6000/7000.

==== United States ====
- Wichita, Kansas — Facility used for the US headquarters of Bombardier as well as an expanded service center, flight testing and engineering facility and home to the Bombardier Defense group.

=== Former facilities ===
==== Canada ====
- Downsview Airport — Dash 8 final assembly and flight test.
- Montréal Mirabel International Airport — CRJ series and A220 family final assembly and flight test. In July 2018 Airbus took over the Mirabel facility as part of its take over of the A220 family program, whilst Bombardier continued to manufacture CRJ series aircraft at the Mirabel facility until the order backlog was completed in December 2020.
- North Bay Airport — Bombardier CL-415 was the final assembly and flight test until production ended in 2015. After a lull in 2002, the plant was restarted by contractor Vortex Aerospace Services in 2005. While production has ended, Vortex continues to provide training for CL 415 at the facility.

==== Morocco ====
- Casablanca (BP 197 Zone Franche Midparc next to Mohammed V International Airport) — Flight controls for CRJ series aircraft. In November 2020, Bombardier sold its Casablanca operations to Spirit AeroSystems.

==== United Kingdom ====
- Belfast, Northern Ireland — Former Short Brothers plant across from Victoria Park near George Best Belfast City Airport. Aircraft fuselage, engine nacelle, wing manufacturing and assembly facility. In November 2020, Bombardier sold its Belfast operations to Spirit AeroSystems.

== Production ==
Bombardier Aerospace fiscal or calendar year delivery of regional, business and amphibious aircraft:

Fiscal/calendar year	Commercial			Business			Amphibious	Total deliveries	Net orders
Fiscal/calendar year	C Series	CRJ	Q-Series	Learjet	Challenger	Global	CL-415	Total deliveries	Net orders
1999/00		81	23	109	40	34	5	292	
2000		105	52	129	38	36	10	370	
2001		165	41	96	45	21	2	370	
2002		191	29	38	23	16	1	298	
2003		214	19	41	31	17	3	324	
2004		175	22	47	62	22	1	329	
2005		110	28	69	98	30	2	337	
2006		64	48	71	99	42	2	326	363
2007		62	66	81	103	48	1	361	698
2008		56	54	70	116	53	4	353	367
2009		60	61	44	82	50	5	302	11
2010		41	56	33	63	47	4	244	201
2011		33	45	33	79	51	4	245	249
2012		14	36	39	86	54	4	233	481
2013		26	29	29	89	62	3	238	388
2014		59	25	34	90	80	2	290	282
2015		44	29	32	94	73	3	275	27
2016	7	46	33	24	88	51		249	275
2017	17	26	30	14	81	45		213	

== Gallery ==
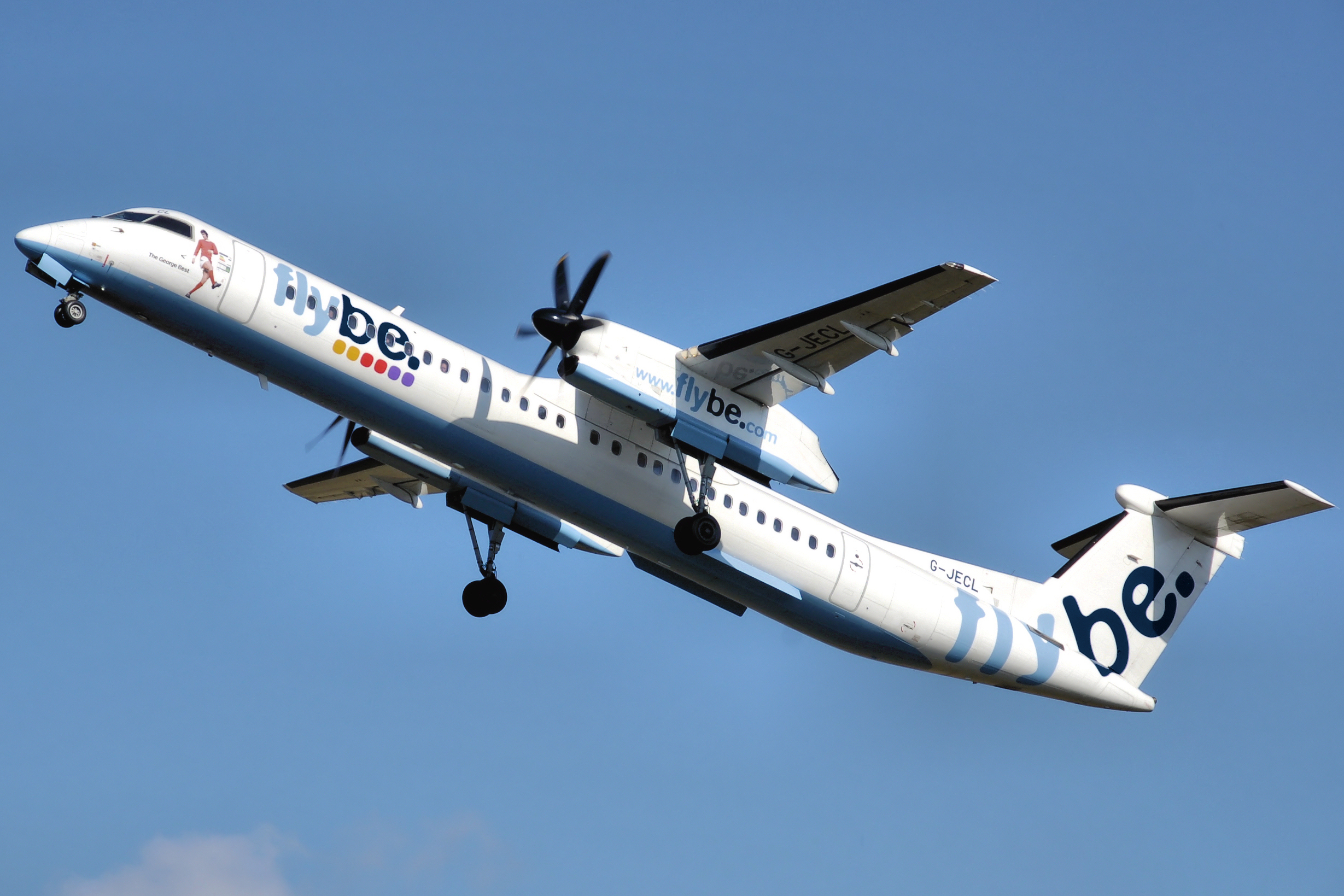
Q400 turboprop regional airliner

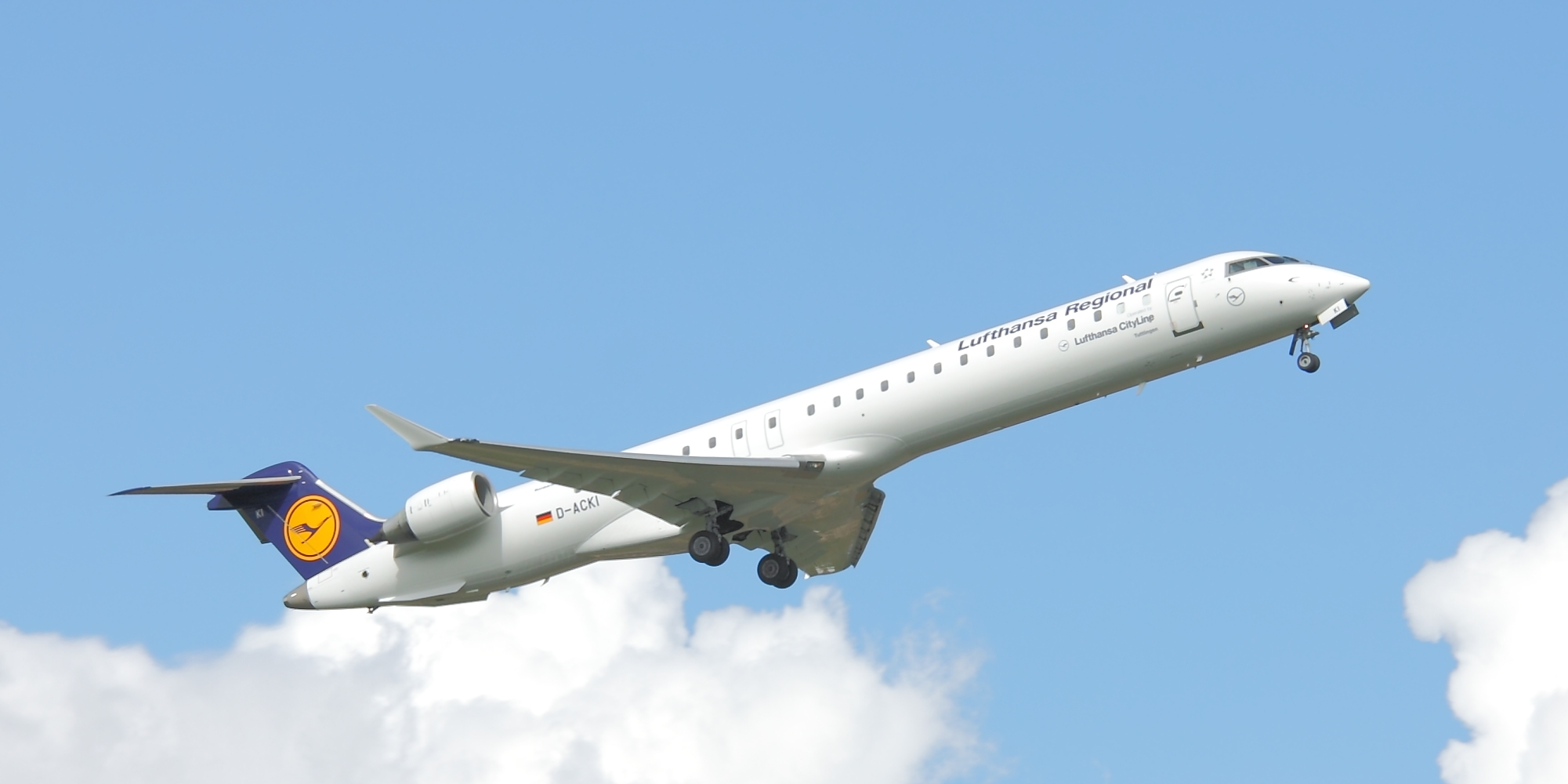
CRJ900 regional jet

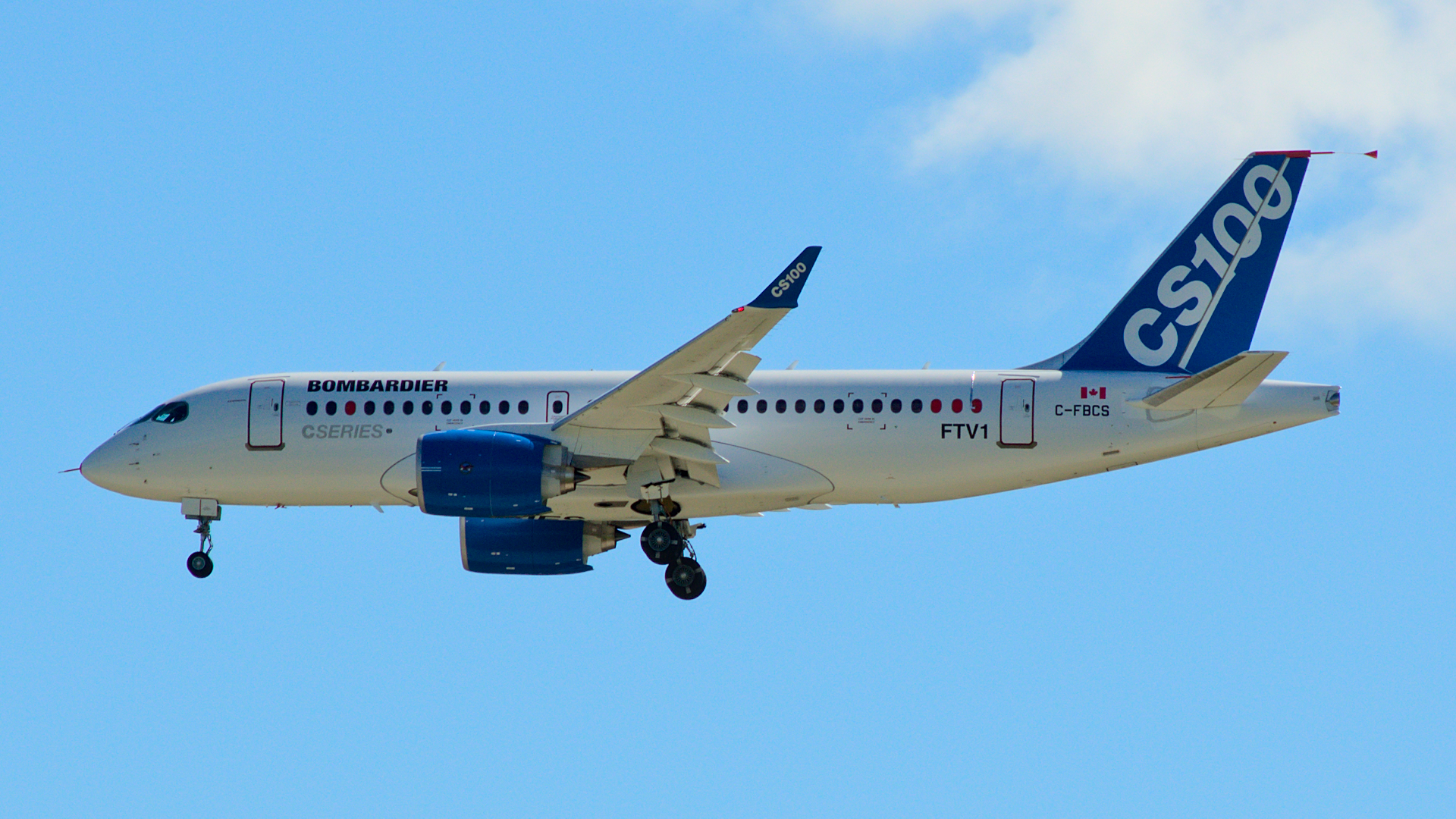
Airbus A220-100 (CS100)

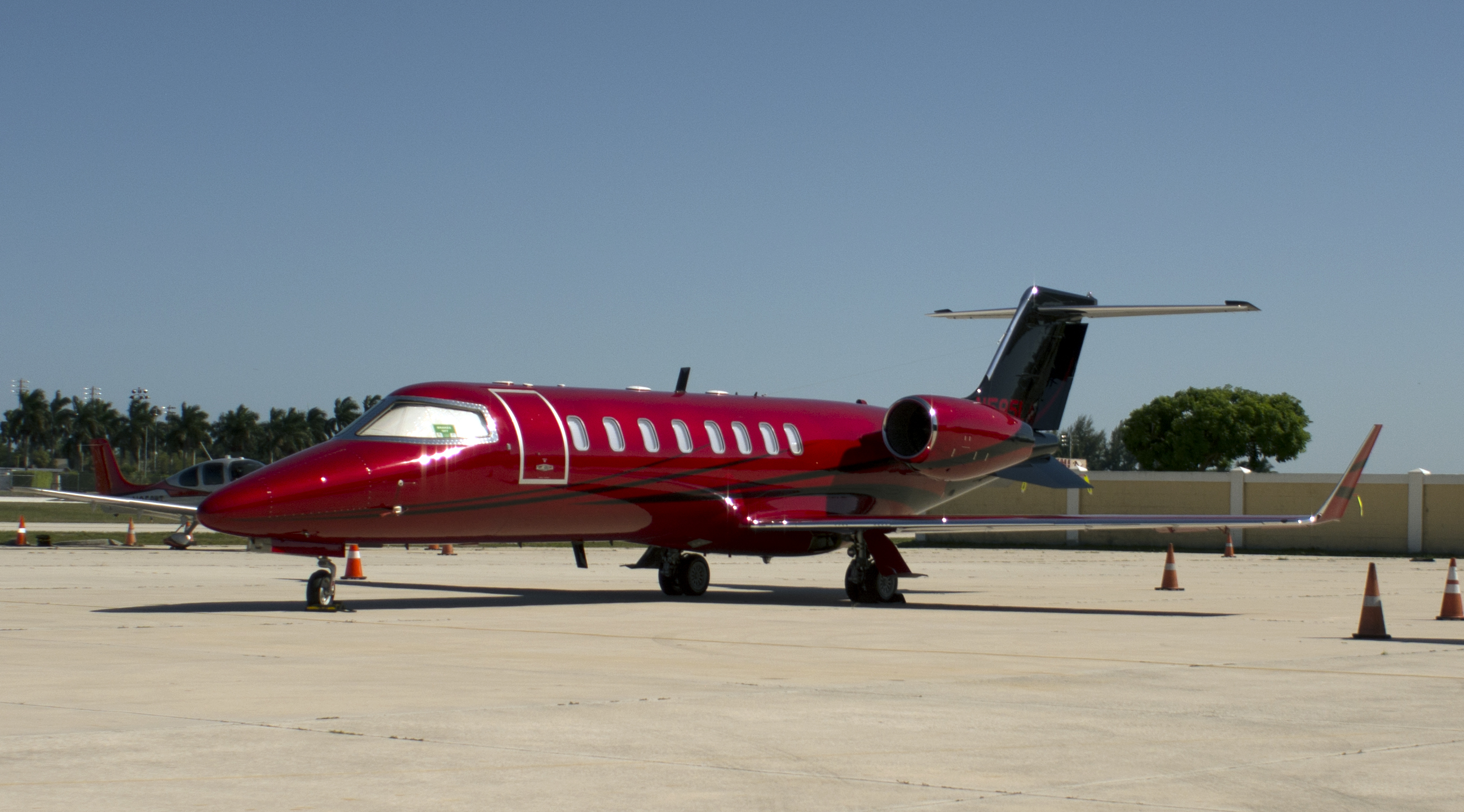
Learjet 75 business jet

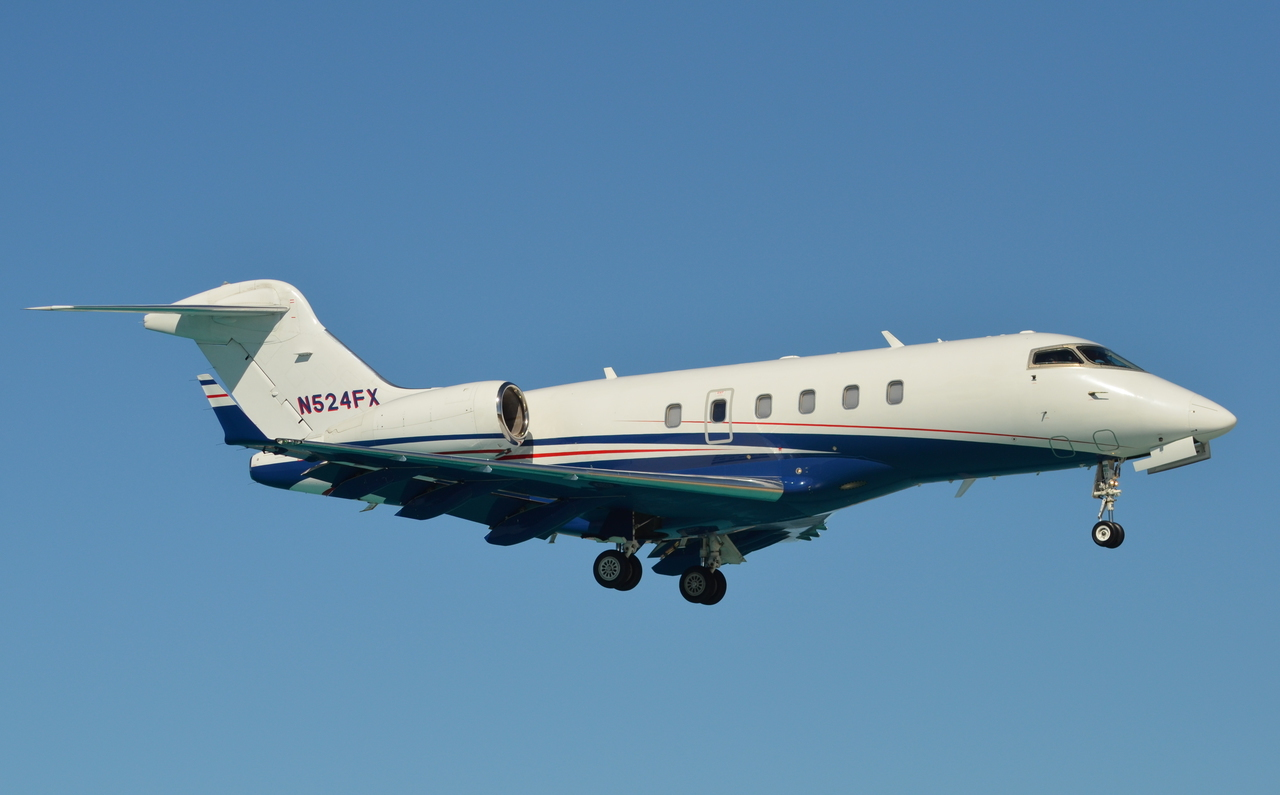
Challenger 300 business jet

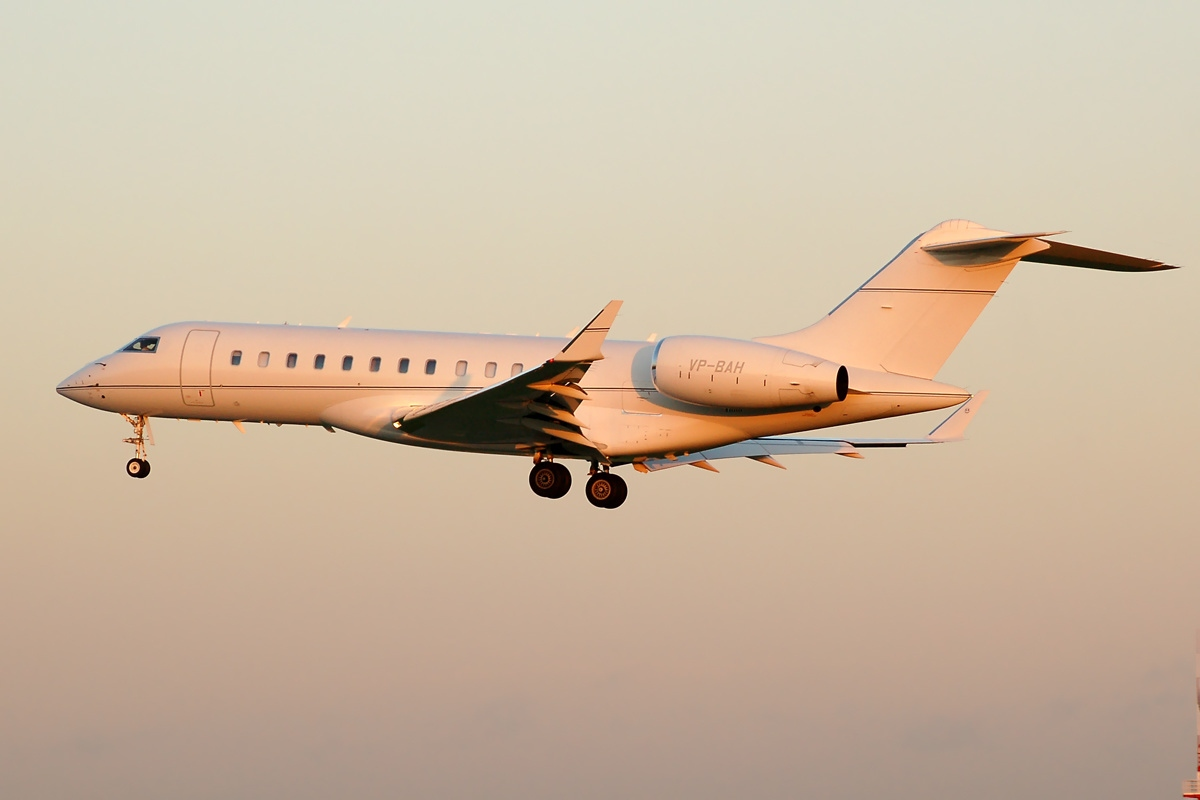
Global Express

== See also ==
- Viking Air – Canadian manufacturer that purchased the type certificates from Bombardier for all discontinued de Havilland Canada designs
