= Learjet 40 =

Business jet aircraft

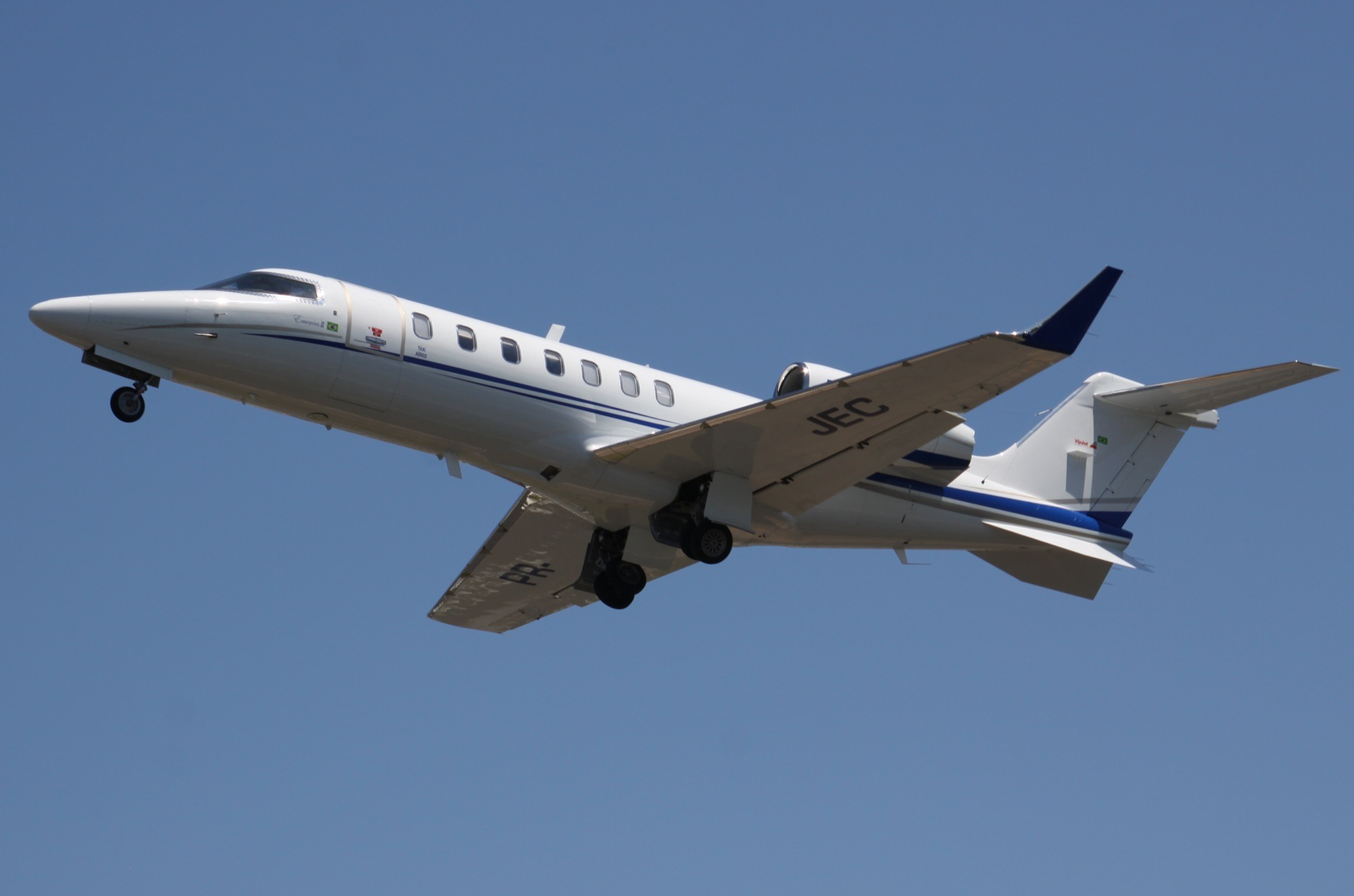

General information
- Type: Business jet
- Manufacturer: Bombardier Aerospace
- Number built: 133

History
- Manufactured: 2002–2013
- Introduction date: January 2004
- First flight: August 31, 2002
- Developed from: Learjet 45
- Developed into: Learjet 70/75

The Learjet 40 (LJ40) is a light business jet produced by Bombardier Aerospace.

== Design and development ==
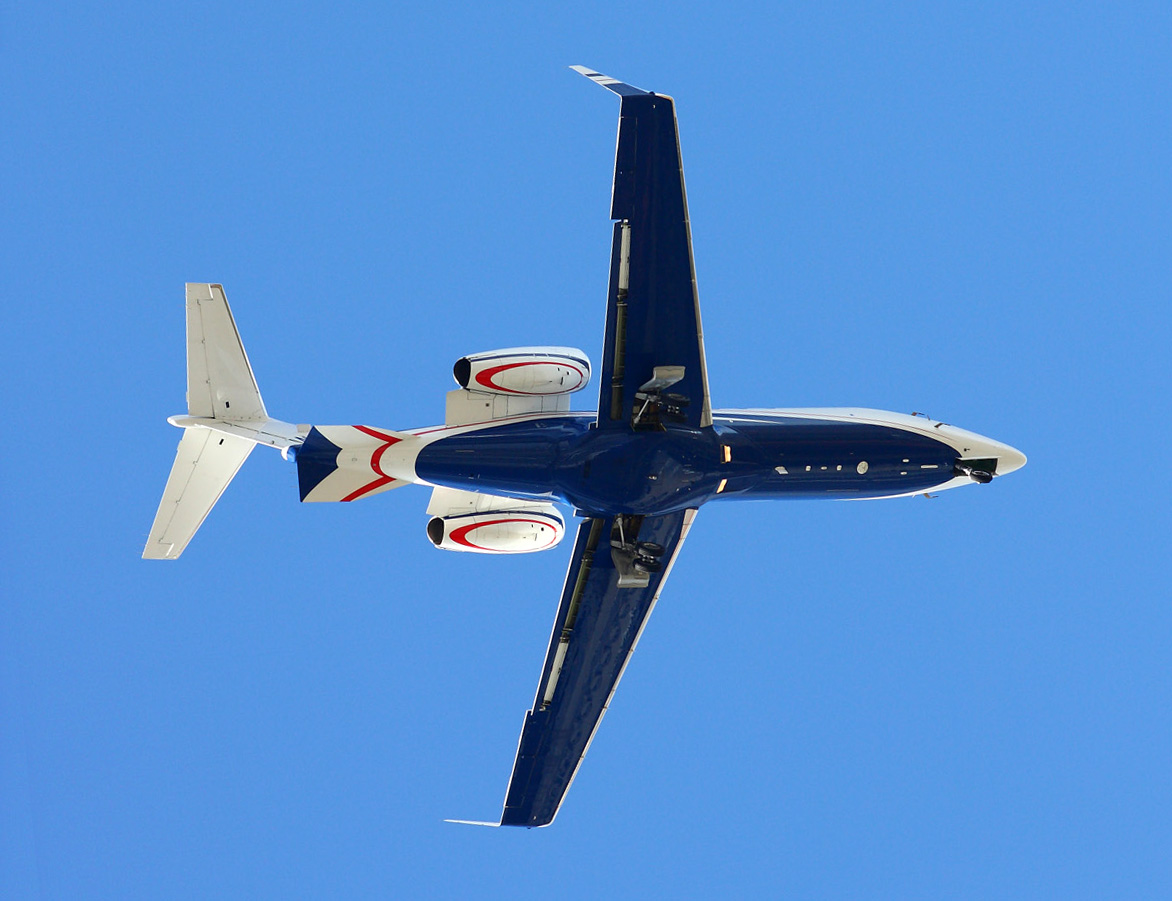
A Flexjet Learjet 40

The Learjet 40 is derived from the Learjet 45, but with a shorter fuselage (by 24.5 inches/60 cm), and is powered by two Honeywell TFE731-20AR engines. These are known as the "AR" engines. The 40 model takes the place of the discontinued Learjet 31a in the Learjet model line, with several performance and comfort improvements taken from the 45 model.

The prototype aircraft, a rebuilt Model 45, first flew on August 31, 2002, and the first production aircraft performed its maiden flight on September 5, 2002. Both flights took place from the Wichita Mid-Continent Airport. The LJ40 entered into service in January, 2004.

The Learjet 40XR is an upgraded version introduced in October, 2004, offering higher takeoff weights, faster cruise speeds and faster time-to-climb rates as compared to the LJ40. The increases are due to the upgrading of the engines to the TFE731-20BR configuration. These are the "BR" engines. LJ40 owners can upgrade their aircraft through the incorporation of several service bulletins.

== Specifications (Learjet 40) ==
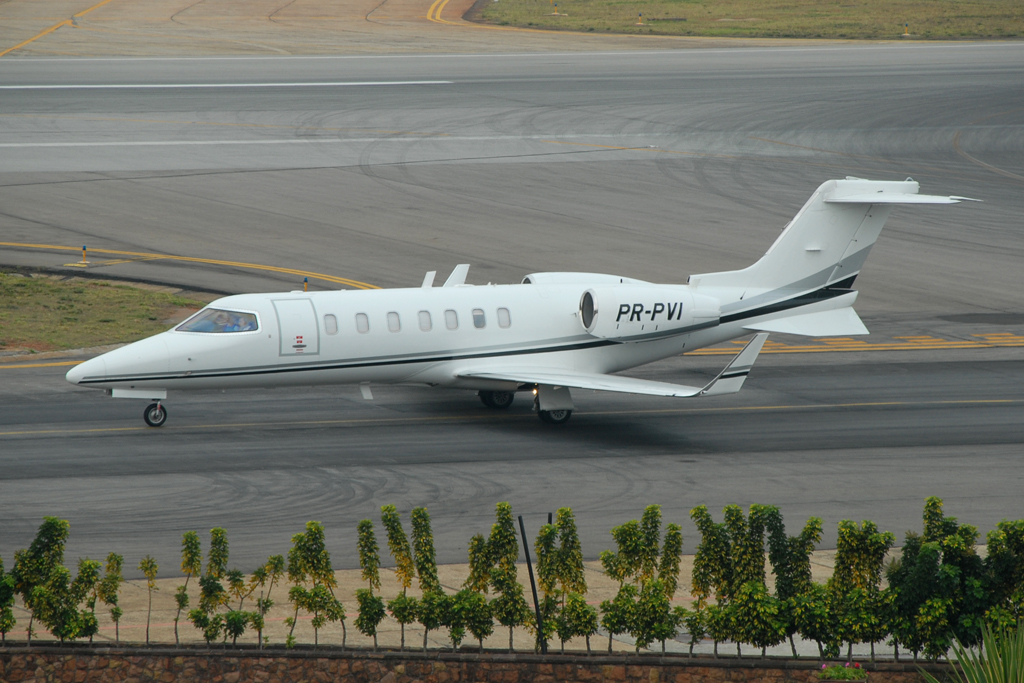

Data from Jane's All the World's Aircraft 2004–2005

General characteristics

- Crew: 2
- Capacity: 7 passengers
- Length: 55 ft 6 in (16.92 m)
- Wingspan: 47 ft 9 1/4 in (14.561 m)
- Height: 14 ft 4 1/2 in (4.382 m)
- Wing area: 311.6 sq ft (28.95 m^{2})
- Aspect ratio: 7.3:1
- Empty weight: 12,740 lb (5,779 kg)
- Max takeoff weight: 20,350 lb (9,231 kg)
- Fuel capacity: 905 US gal (754 imp gal; 3,430 L)
- Powerplant: 2 × Honeywell TFE731-20AR turbofan engines, 3,500 lbf (16 kN) thrust each

Performance

- Maximum speed: Mach 0.81 (MMO)
- Cruise speed: 464 kn (534 mph, 859 km/h) (max cruise)
- Range: 1,857 nmi (2,137 mi, 3,439 km) (2 crew and 4 passengers)
- Service ceiling: 51,000 ft (16,000 m)
- Time to altitude: 22 minutes to Flight level 430

== See also ==
Related lists

- List of civil aircraft
