= Learjet 25 =

Business jet in the US

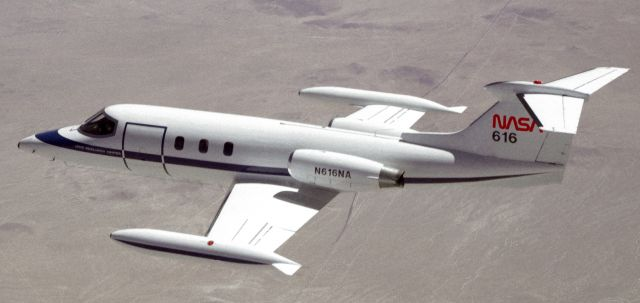
- A NASA Learjet 25

General information
- Type: Business jet
- National origin: United States
- Manufacturer: Learjet
- Status: Active
- Primary users: Bolivian Air Force Mexican Navy
- Number built: 369

History
- Manufactured: 1966–1982
- Introduction date: November 1967
- First flight: August 12, 1966
- Developed from: Learjet 24
- Developed into: Learjet 28; Learjet 35

The Learjet 25 is an American ten-seat (two crew and eight passengers), twin-engine, high-speed business jet aircraft manufactured by Learjet. It is a stretched version of the Learjet 24.

== Development ==
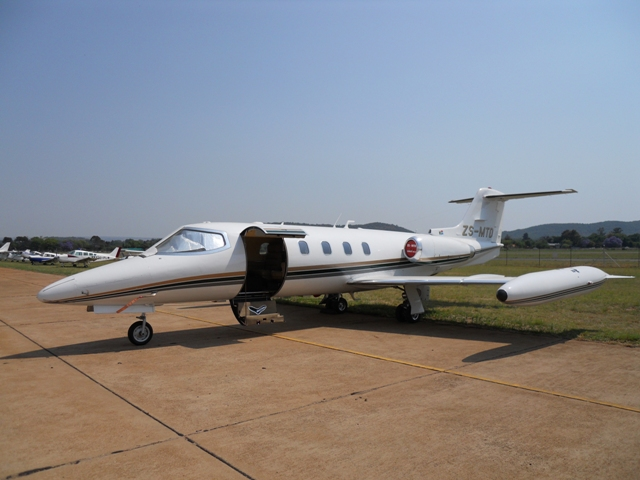
A Learjet 25B

The first Model 25 flew on August 12, 1966, and the first delivery was in November 1967. The Learjet 25A got its type certification on May 19th, 1970, while the 25B and 25C were type certified on September 4th 1970, and the later D and F models were certified on May 20th, 1976.

The Learjet 25 is similar to the Model 24 but is 1.27 m (4 ft 2 in) longer, allowing for three additional passengers. In 1970 the Learjet 25B was produced along with the Learjet 25C in the same year. Type development continued with the Models 25D and 25G, which included more advanced CJ610-8A engines and a ceiling increase to 51,000 ft (16,000 m).

By 2019, 1970s Learjet 25s were sold for under $200,000.

== Design ==
=== Engines ===
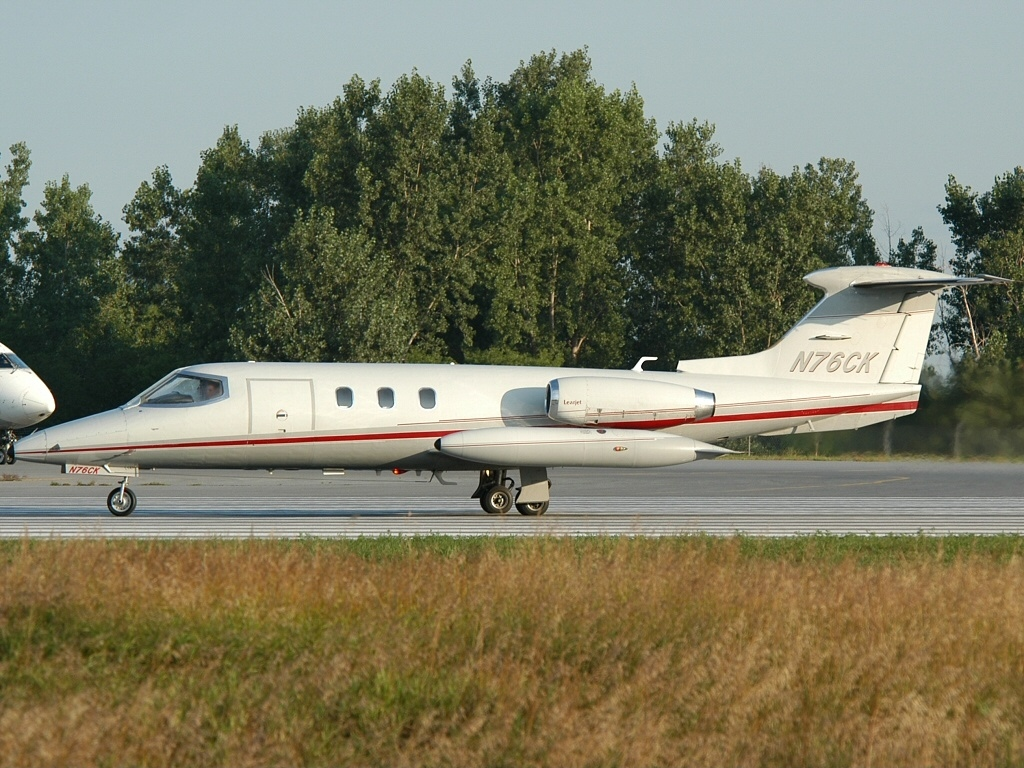
Learjet 25 about to take-off

Two General Electric CJ610-6 single-rotor axial-flow turbojet engines are pylon-mounted on the aft fuselage. Each engine is rated at 2,950 pounds-force (13.1 kN) of thrust at sea level. The engine has of an eight-stage axial-flow compressor directly coupled to a two-stage turbine, a through-flow annular combustion system, variable inlet guide vanes, controlled compressor interstage bleed, exhaust nozzle and an accessory drive system. Starting ignition is provided by a dual output capacitor-discharge system. As the ignition cycle is completed, the igniter plugs cease sparking and combustion becomes self-sustaining. A fuel control metering system selects the rate of fuel flow to the engine combustor.

The electrically operated RPM tachometer consists of a signal generator on the engine and an indicator located in the centre of the instrument panel. Dial markings are based on percent of maximum allowable engine speed. The large markings are graduated in 2% increments from 0% to 100% and the small dial is graduated in 1% increments from 0% to 10% to allow the pilots to accomplish more precise engine speed settings. The engine pressure ratio (EPR) system enables the pilot to obtain power required to meet certified aircraft performance without exceeding engine limitations. The engine compressor inlet and turbine discharge pressures are sensed by the EPR transmitter and transformed into an electrical signal that is transmitted to the EPR indicator.

Fuel flow is indicated via a fuel flow system. The fuel flow through a rotor-turbine at each engine causes the rotor to spin and a pickup coil emits pulses as the rotor blades pass through the coil field. The pulsating DC voltage is averaged and forwarded through the selector switch to the fuel flow indicator.

=== Hydraulics ===
The landing gear, brake, flap and spoiler systems are hydraulically operated. On aircraft 25-061 through 25-180 the engine driven hydraulic pumps supply fluid under a pressure of 1,500 psi (10.3 MPa). System pressure is maintained at 1,250 to 1,500 psi (8.6 to 10.3 MPa) by a pressure regulator. On aircraft 25-181 and subsequent the variable volume engine driven pump delivers fluid under a pressure of 1,450 psi (10.0 MPa) to the system and static pressure is maintained at 1,500 to 1,550 psi (10.3 to 10.7 MPa). Over pressurization is prevented by a pressure relief valve which opens at 1,700 psi (11.7 MPa). A pre-charged accumulator dampens and absorbs pressure surges. Two motor-driven shutoff valves will stop hydraulic flow to the engine-driven pumps in case of an emergency. The valves are controlled by the FIRE switch and activation of these valves are indicated with pinhead lights located in the cockpit next to the FIRE switch.

On aircraft equipped with an auxiliary hydraulic pump, the hydraulic pump switch located at the lower center of the instrument panel activates the auxiliary hydraulic pump to provide in-flight standby hydraulic pressure. A pressure switch will energize the pump if hydraulic pressure falls below a preset level and de-energize the pump when pressure returns to normal. A duty cycle of 3 minutes on and a cooling period of 20 minutes off is required to avoid overheating the pump motor.

=== Pneumatics ===
The Learjet 25A was the first to use the signature pneumatic clam-shell style cabin door design that has been used on all Learjet products since. Designed for the Learjet 25 in 1963 by Bill Lear to minimize the number of stairs for the passenger to climb. The door is opened by pneumatic pistons holding up the upper part of the clamshell, and a pair of pistons slowly letting down the bottom part of the clamshell.

=== Landing gear ===
The hydraulically retractable landing gear is of conventional tricycle configuration with air-hydraulic shock-type nose and main gear. The main gear has dual wheels and brakes on each strut. The brake system incorporates four power-boosted disc-type brakes with integral anti-skid system. The nose wheel has a specially moulded tire to prevent water splashing into the engines.

Nose wheel steering is electronically controlled by the rudder pedals, utilizing the synchro principle. Hydraulic pressure for retraction and extension of the gear is transmitted by a system of tubing, hoses and actuating cylinders and is electrically controlled by limit switches and solenoid valves. Emergency extension can be accomplished pneumatically in case of hydraulic or electrical system failure. The main gear is enclosed by two doors after retraction. The inboard doors are hydraulically operated while the outboard doors are mechanically operated by linkage connected to the main gear struts. The nose gear doors operate mechanically with linkages attached to the nose gear shock strut.

=== Brakes ===
The Learjet 25 utilize wheel brakes as the primary method for reducing speed after landing. The brake system utilizes hydraulic pressure for power boost. The brake valves are controlled via the rudder pedal toe brakes through mechanical linkages. Two shuttle valves in the pressure lines prevent fluid feedback between the pilot's and copilot's pedals. Four additional shuttle valves connect the pneumatic system to the brake system for emergency braking. An integral anti-skid system in installed to affect maximum braking efficiency. In order to minimize heat build-up in the brakes and reduce brake wear, pilots are advised to deploy the spoilers upon touchdown.

Wheel speed transducers in each main wheel axle induce an AC frequency on the DC voltage input proportionate to the wheel speed as they are driven by the wheels. This frequency is compared to a normal deceleration curve and if it deviates it activates a small torque motor in the affected wheel control valve which shunts braking pressure to the return line by means of a spool valve. As the wheel rotation speed accelerates to normal tolerance limits, normal braking pressure is restored.

=== Fuel ===
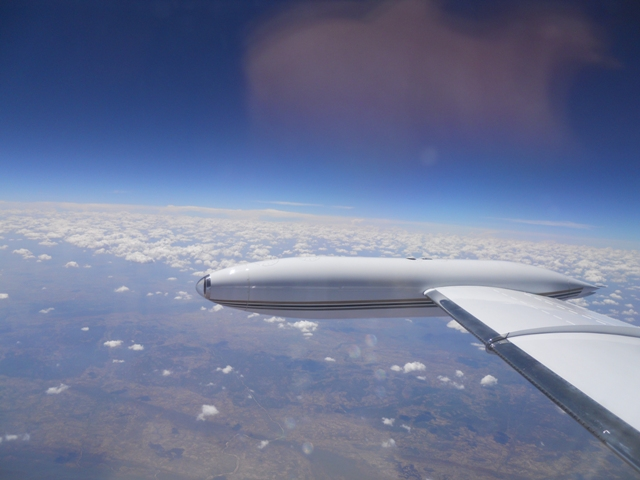
External, wingtip-mounted fuel tank of a Learjet 25

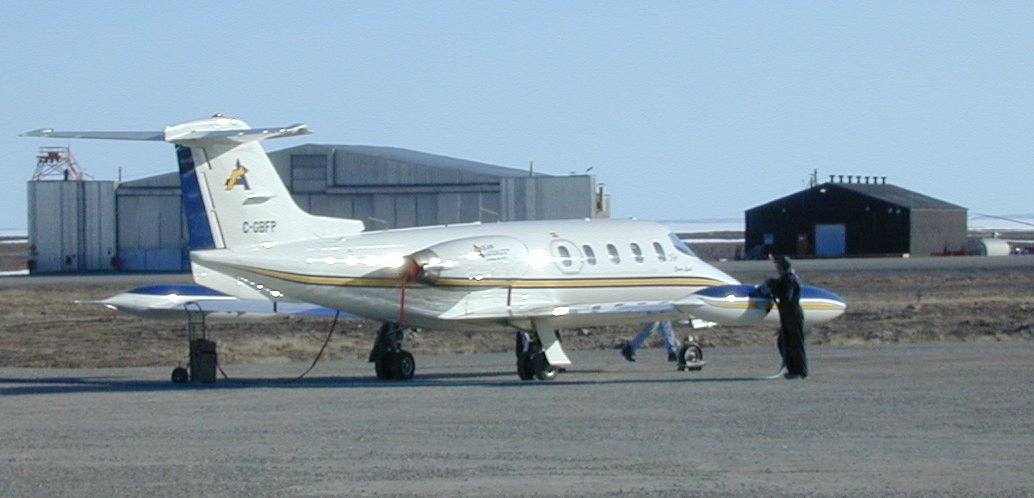
A Learjet 25D being refuelled

The Learjet 25 generally has five fuel tanks. Two wing tanks, a fuselage tank and two wing tip tanks. Each wing tank extends from the centre bulkhead outboard to the wing tip and provides separate fuel for each engine. A tank cross-flow valve is installed to prevent fuel transfer between wing tanks. Flapper-type check valves, located in the various wing ribs, allow free fuel flow inboard but restrict outboard flow. A jet pump and electrical boost pump are mounted in each wing tank near the centre bulkhead to supply fuel under pressure to the respective engine fuel system.

The tip tanks provide additional fuel capacity to enable longer times aloft. A jet pump installed in each tip tank transfers fuel into the wing tanks. Fuel can also flow via the flapper check valves into the wing tanks, but the lower half of the fuel in the tip tanks must be transferred with the jet pump.

Most Learjet 25 aircraft were fitted with a fuselage tank. The fuselage tank can be filled by the wing boost pumps through the transfer line and the fuel transfer valve. When the tank is full, a float switch de-energizes the wing boost pumps and closes the valve. During fuel transfer, the fuselage tank transfer pump pumps fuel into both the wing tanks.

=== Electrical systems ===
The aircraft is equipped with AC (Alternating Current) and DC (Direct Current) electrical systems. The DC system is powered from two 28 Volt, 400 Amperes, engine-driven starter-generators. Two 24 Volt batteries provide standby power for the DC system and are used for engine starting. AC current is provided by two 1000 Volt-Amperes (VA) solid-state inverters. The inverter outputs are frequency synchronized through a paralleling bus tie. Some aircraft have a 1000 VA auxiliary inverter that is used as an option for added system capacity.

=== Flight controls ===
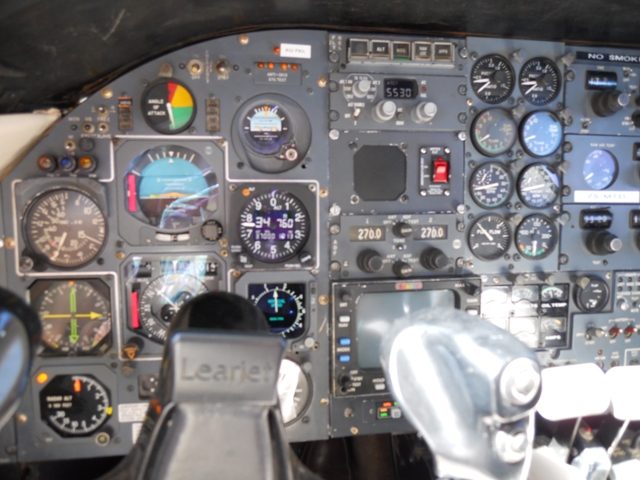
Flight panel of a Learjet 25B

Primary flight control is achieved by use of dual control wheels and rudder pedals. The control wheels operate the elevator and ailerons mechanically through a system of cables, pulleys, push-pull tubes and bell cranks. Trim functions, microphone keying, autopilot override and steering system switches are located on the control wheels. The rudder pedals mechanically operate the rudder for directional yaw control. Nose wheel steering is electrically controlled via the rudder pedals.

Conventional wing flaps are used to improve low speed flying characteristics and reduce landing and take-off speeds. The flaps are hydraulically operated. Interconnecting cables synchronize the flaps throughout their range of travel and a limit switch located on the left flap sector prevents over-travel. A warning horn sounds if flaps are extended more than 25 degrees, unless the landing gear is down and locked.

The stall warning system utilizes a stall warning vane on each side of the nose. The vanes provide regulated voltage input to the angle-of-attack transducers, modified by a stall warning bias box to compensate for flap position. The angle-of-attack transducer supplies a proportional voltage to the angle-of-attack of the aircraft. When the aircraft speed is 7% above stall, the stall warning energizes a control column shaker that produces a low-frequency buffet signal through the control column to warn the crew. When both angle-of-attack transducer vanes increase to 5% above stall, the pitch servo commands an aircraft nose down attitude. The force applied in the nose down direction is 80 pounds at the control wheel. When the angle-of-attack transducer vanes decrease below the stall point, the nose down command is removed. An angle-of-attack indicator translates signals from the stall warning system into visual indications of the aircraft angle-of-attack and allows the crew to monitor the proximity of stall caution zone. The indicator face is divided into green (safe), yellow (caution) and red (danger) segments.

Airspeed indication is provided by a single pointer, dual scale airspeed/ mach meter. The pointer responds to the dynamic pressure from the pitot heads on the nose compartment. The conventional airspeed scale is calibrated in knots and the Mach scale is calibrated in percentage of Mach and connected to an aneroid that moves the scale to compensate for changes in pressure altitude.

=== Air conditioning and pressurization ===
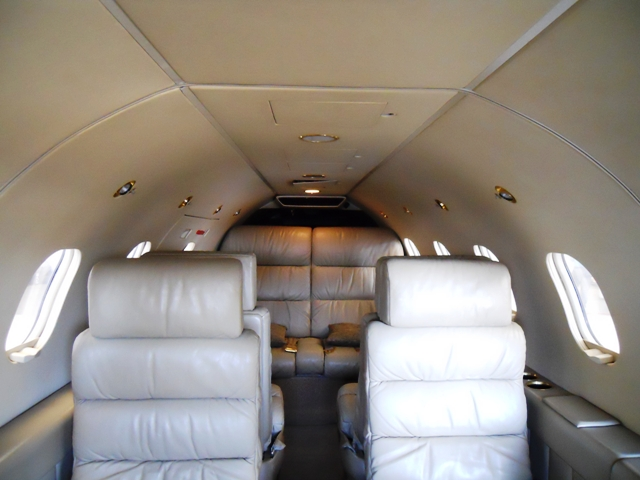
Cabin of a Learjet 25B

Engine bleed air is admitted through a flow control valve to a heat exchanger. The cabin temperature is controlled by regulating the temperature of the pressure bleed air that is routed through the cabin. The bleed air is cooled in the heat exchanger by ram air entering the dorsal fin inlet and passing through the heat exchanger. The amount of bleed air cooling at the heat exchanger can be controlled by the hot air bypass valve (H-valve). The H-valve position can be adjusted by the crew to increase or reduce the amount of bleed air cooling at the heat exchanger.

A refrigeration-type cooling system is used for cooling and dehumidification while the aircraft is on the ground or operating at altitudes below 18,000 ft (5,500 m). The refrigeration system consists of a compressor, receiver dehydrator and evaporative cooler located above the baggage compartment.

The Learjet 25 cabin is pressurized to enable high altitude operations without the use of supplemental oxygen. The cabin pressure is provided by the conditioned air entering the cabin through the distribution ducts and controlled by modulating the amount of air exhausted from the cabin. During ground operations, a solenoid limits the pressure differential to 0.25 psi (17 hPa) in order to ensure normal functioning of the door and emergency exit. The pressure differential at final cruising altitude will be maintained at 8.7 psi (600 hPa) difference between pressure altitude and cabin altitude. A rate controller enables the crew to select the rate pressurization of the cabin within preset limits. The normal pressure relief valve will open at 8.9 psi (610 hPa) differential pressure and the safety outflow valve will open at 9.2 psi (630 hPa) differential pressure which is the maximum allowable differential pressure. Oxygen is contained in a pressurized bottle located in the dorsal fin of the aircraft. The use of oxygen is only required for emergency in case of depressurization of the cabin or contamination of the cabin air. Oxygen is always available for the crew and can be made available to the passengers manually or automatically. The oxygen storage cylinder has a capacity of 38 cubic feet (1,100 L) and is stored at 1,800 psi (12 MPa). An oxygen rupture disc will relieve oxygen pressure if the oxygen cylinder pressure reaches 2,700 to 3,000 psi (19 to 21 MPa). A green overboard indicator on the outside surface of the dorsal fin will be ruptured or missing to indicate that the rupture disc is not intact.

=== Fire detection ===
The engine fire system is of the continuous-element type and will provide a FIRE warning indication to the crew in the event that the rear nacelle area temperature exceeds 510 °F (266 °C) or if the forward nacelle area temperature exceeds 480 °F (249 °C).

Two spherical fire extinguisher containers can discharge their contents to either engine. A check valve prevents reverse flow between the containers. Monobromotrifluoromethane (CF3BR) is used as extinguishing agent. Two disc-type indicators are flush mounted under the left engine. If the yellow disc is ruptured, either or both containers have been discharged into the engine nacelle. If the red disc is ruptured, either or both the containers have been discharged overboard as a result of an overheat condition causing excessive pressure within the containers.

=== Drag chute ===
A drag chute is fitted as optional equipment on some Learjet 25 aircraft. The chute offers an additional safety margin, since it can significantly reduce the stopping distance. The drag chute is attached to the aircraft with a lanyard system that releases it from the aircraft should an inadvertent deployment be made while airborne. The lanyard is attached to the aircraft at the forward end of the tailcone access door opening. This point is near the aircraft centre of gravity and minimizes weathervaning when the chute is deployed under crosswind conditions. The drag chute has been deployed in a crosswind of up to 20 knots under actual test conditions.

=== Flight characteristics ===
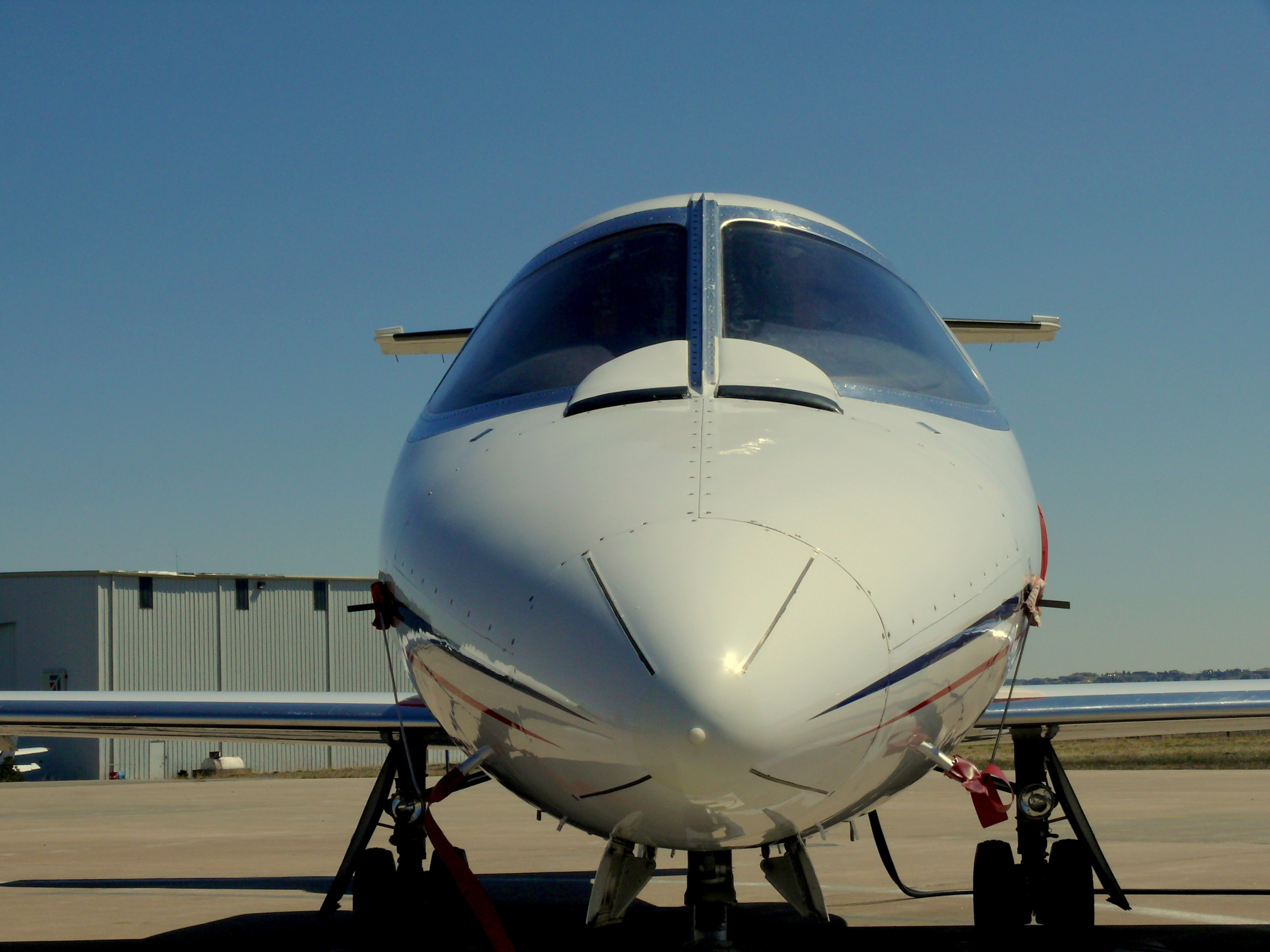
Nose of a Learjet 25D

Taxi operations are accomplished using the electronic nose wheel steering. The steering system on aircraft without variable authority nose wheel steering requires the pilot to select master or primary steering mode. In master mode, 10 degrees of steering is possible. This mode is suitable for straight taxi, takeoff and gentle turns. Primary steering mode allows up to 45 degrees angle of turn and is suitable for slow speed aggressive steering maneuvers. On aircraft equipped with variable authority steering, the steering authority varies with ground speed. The CJ610-6 engines fitted to the Learjet 25 have very low inertia and accelerate rapidly. The time required to accelerate from idle to 100% RPM is approximately four seconds. This excellent throttle response enables rapid acceleration and precise power settings. Single engine performance is good with the single engine rate of climb approximately 1,700 feet per minute (8.6 m/s) at gross weight at sea level and a standard temperature of 15 °C, with a single engine service ceiling of approximately 21,500 ft (6,600 m).

The spoilers provide an effective means of increasing normal rates of descent and may be used as a drag device to achieve rapid airspeed deceleration.

The best glide distance with engines windmilling is obtained with a clean airplane configuration and with a glide speed of 160 to 170 kn (300 to 310 km/h). At this speed, the Learjet 25 glides approximately 26 nautical miles (48 km) for each 10,000 ft (3,000 m) of altitude loss. This is a glide ratio of 16 to 1 and is based on a wings level glide with gear and flap up and a weight of 11,000 to 12,000 lb (5,000 to 5,400 kg).

The Learjet 25 is a challenging aircraft to fly in comparison with most general aviation aircraft and more modern light jets. Pilot workload is high and approach, landing and takeoff speeds are above average for civilian aircraft. The Learjet 25 also requires long runways at high altitude or high ambient temperature. At 6,000 ft (1,800 m) elevation, 50 °F (10 °C) and with an average load of 5 passengers, the Learjet 25B will require approximately 8,000 ft (2,400 m) of runway.

== Operations ==
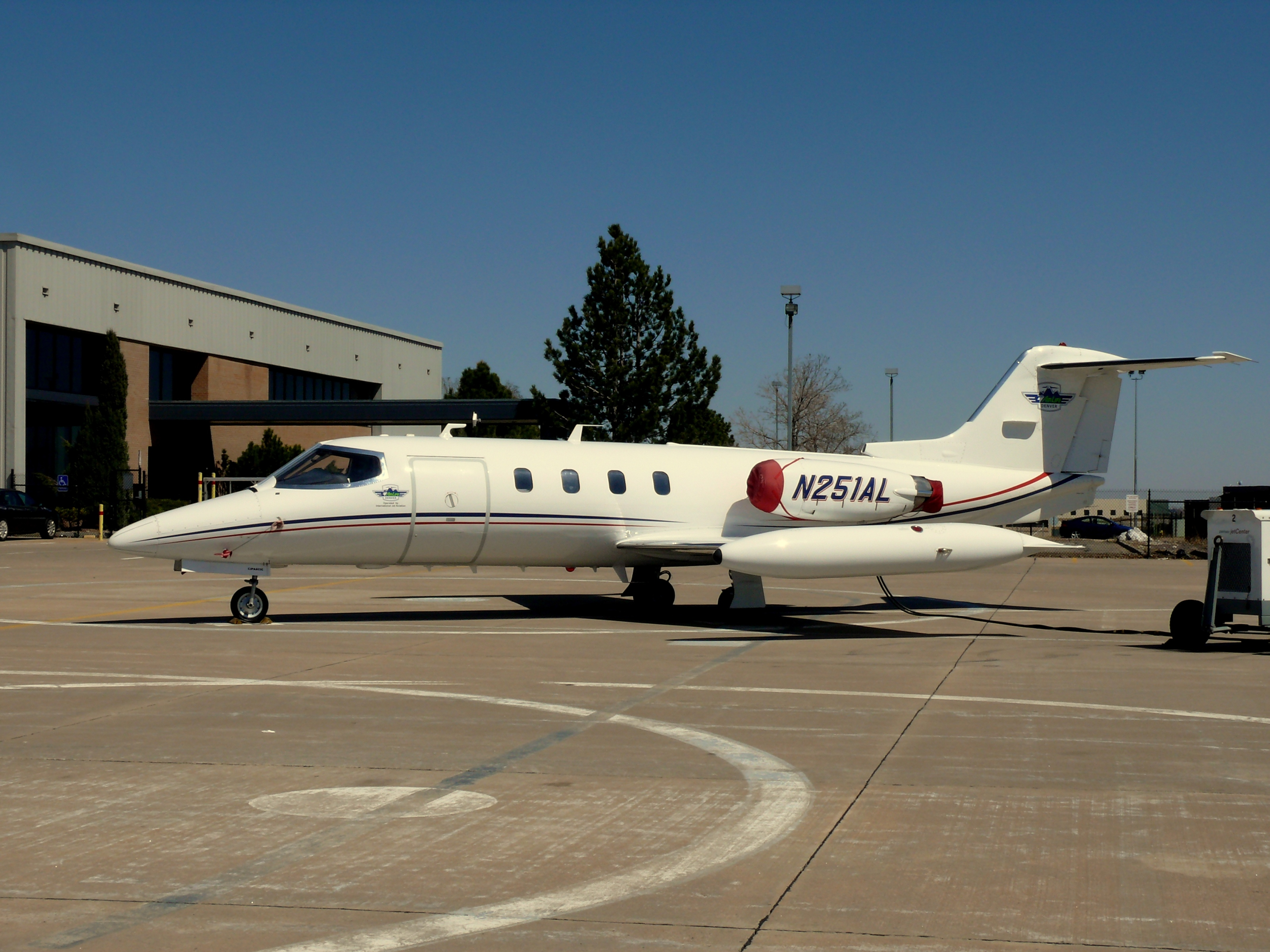
A Learjet 25 equipped for medevac flights

The Learjet 25 offers a high speed platform for business travel for six to eight passengers. Typical cruising altitudes are between Flight Level 390 and Flight Level 430 which means the Learjet 25 is capable of overflying most weather systems and congested airspace. A typical cruising speed is approximately Mach 0.76.

The cabin interior can be converted to several different configurations to allow for cargo and medevacs. To become a medevac aircraft, the starboard seating is removed to allow for a stretcher as well as oxygen bottles and intravenous drip equipment. The two flight crew are then supplemented by either a doctor or flight nurse or both. The Model 25C also has an optional two bed sleeping compartment.

The Learjet can land on gravel runways if it is fitted with a special "gravel kit". Without it, it is possible for gravel from an improperly packed gravel runway to be sucked into the engines causing "foreign object damage", thus the need for the kit.

In 1974 the Peruvian Air Force purchased two 25Bs with a belly pod that contained an aerial survey camera.

Many Learjet 25 aircraft remain in regular use today, particularly in the United States, Mexico, and Canada.

=== Noise compliance ===
In 2013, the FAA modified 14 CFR part 91 rules to prohibit the operation of jets weighing 75,000 lb (34,000 kg) or less that are not stage 3 noise compliant after December 31, 2015. The Learjet 25 is listed explicitly. Any Learjet 25s that have not been modified by installing noise compliant engines or "hushkits" are not be permitted to fly in the contiguous 48 states from December 31, 2015. Exceptions may be granted.

== Variants ==
The ICAO designator as used in flight plans for all Learjet 25 models is LJ25.

=== Learjet 25 ===
FAA certified on October 10, 1967.

=== Learjet 25A ===
FAA certified on May 19th, 1970.

=== Learjet 25B ===
Improved version. FAA certified on September 4, 1970.

=== Learjet 25C ===
Improved version with greater fuel capacity. FAA certified on September 4, 1970.

=== Learjet 25D ===
Longer-range version, that also altered the "bullet" style housing after the horizontal tail actuator mechanism was redesigned. FAA certified on May 20th, 1976

=== Learjet 25F ===
FAA certified on May 20th, 1976

=== Learjet 25G ===
Introduced September 23, 1980. During a series of demonstration flights lasting from June 9 to 18, 1982, the 25G broke a number of long-distance speed and fuel consumption records.

== Operators ==
=== Civilian operators ===
Greece

- Olympic Airlines

Mexico

- TAESA

=== Military operators ===
Argentina
Bolivia

- Bolivian Air Force

Ecuador
Mexico

- Mexican Navy

=== Former military operators ===
Peru

- Peruvian Air Force

United States

- NASA

== Accidents and incidents ==
- On 18 January 1977, Džemal Bijedić, prime minister of Yugoslavia, his wife Razija and six others were killed when their Learjet 25 crashed on the Inač mountain near Kreševo, Bosnia and Herzegovina. The plane took off from Batajnica Air Base in Belgrade and was en route to Sarajevo when it crashed, ostensibly due to poor weather conditions.
- On May 18, 1983, a Learjet 25B flying from Wien-Schwechat International Airport, Vienna, Austria to Hamburg-Fuhlsbüttel Airport, Hamburg, Germany, did not respond to controllers' requests 40 minutes after takeoff. The aircraft, registered D-CDPD and operated by Air Traffic Executive Jet, was carrying two crew and one passenger. It continued in flight at 39,000 feet (12,000 m) until its fuel was exhausted. It crashed into the Atlantic Ocean 350 mi (560 km) northwest of Scotland.
- On 2 March 1996, a privately chartered Learjet 25D had the Brazilian comedy rock band Mamonas Assassinas were killed while approaching Guarulhos International Airport, the major airport serving the city of São Paulo. The plane made a previous landing attempt and was approaching the airport for a second attempt. The aircraft extended its downwind leg and crashed into the Cantareira mountain range just north of the airport. All five members of the band were killed, along with two additional passengers and both crew members. The investigation showed several errors that led to the accident, including fatigue of the crew of the air taxi company hired for the transport of the rock band after a 17-hour duty cycle.
- On December 9, 2012, a privately chartered Learjet 25 made an extreme departure from level flight while carrying seven occupants, including Mexican-American singer Jenni Rivera. The aircraft departed Monterrey at 3:15 a.m. for a planned one-hour flight, with Toluca, a city just outside Mexico City, as its destination. According to authorities, communication with the plane was lost 10 minutes after departure. The wreckage of the aircraft was found in the municipality of Los Tecojotes, and rescue personnel confirmed that all aboard were killed. From the lack of scatter of the wreckage, the aircraft is believed to have impacted at a vertical angle of over 80 degrees from horizontal.
- On April 10, 2014, a privately owned Learjet 25D was destroyed on the ground by Venezuelan forces. The airplane had reportedly departed Belém, Brazil without a flight plan and with the transponder turned off. The Venezuelan armed forces forced the Learjet to land on suspicion the aircraft was being used for "illicit activities", possibly involving drugs smuggling. The airplane was destroyed on the ground.
- On May 17, 2017, a Learjet 25B registration XA-VMC operated by the company Aerotransportes Huitzilin S. A. de C. V. crashed at 3:26 p.m. local time shortly after taking off from Toluca International Airport, Mexico bound for Durango. Both pilots died.

== Specifications (Learjet 25D) ==
Data from Jane's All The World's Aircraft 1976–77

General characteristics

- Crew: 2 pilots
- Capacity: 8 passengers
- Length: 47 ft 7 in (14.50 m)
- Wingspan: 35 ft 7 in (10.85 m)
- Height: 12 ft 3 in (3.73 m)
- Wing area: 231.77 sq ft (21.532 m^{2})
- Aspect ratio: 5.01:1
- Airfoil: NACA 64A109
- Empty weight: 7,640 lb (3,465 kg)
- Max takeoff weight: 15,000 lb (6,804 kg)
- Fuel capacity: 715 US gal (595 imp gal; 2,710 L)
- Powerplant: 2 × General Electric CJ610-6 turbojets, 2,950 lbf (13.1 kN) thrust each

Performance

- Cruise speed: 534 mph (859 km/h, 464 kn) (Mach 0.81) at 41,000 ft (12,000 m), (Max cruise)
- Stall speed: 105 mph (169 km/h, 91 kn) (wheels and flaps down) IAS
- Range: 1,767 mi (2,844 km, 1,535 nmi) with four passengers, maximum fuel, and 45 minute reserve
- Service ceiling: 45,000 ft (14,000 m)
- Rate of climb: 6,050 ft/min (30.7 m/s)

== See also ==
- 1999 South Dakota Learjet crash (actually a Learjet 35)
- 2012 Mexico Learjet 25 crash

Related development

- Learjet 24
- Learjet 28
