= General Electric CJ610 =

Turbojet engine

CJ610
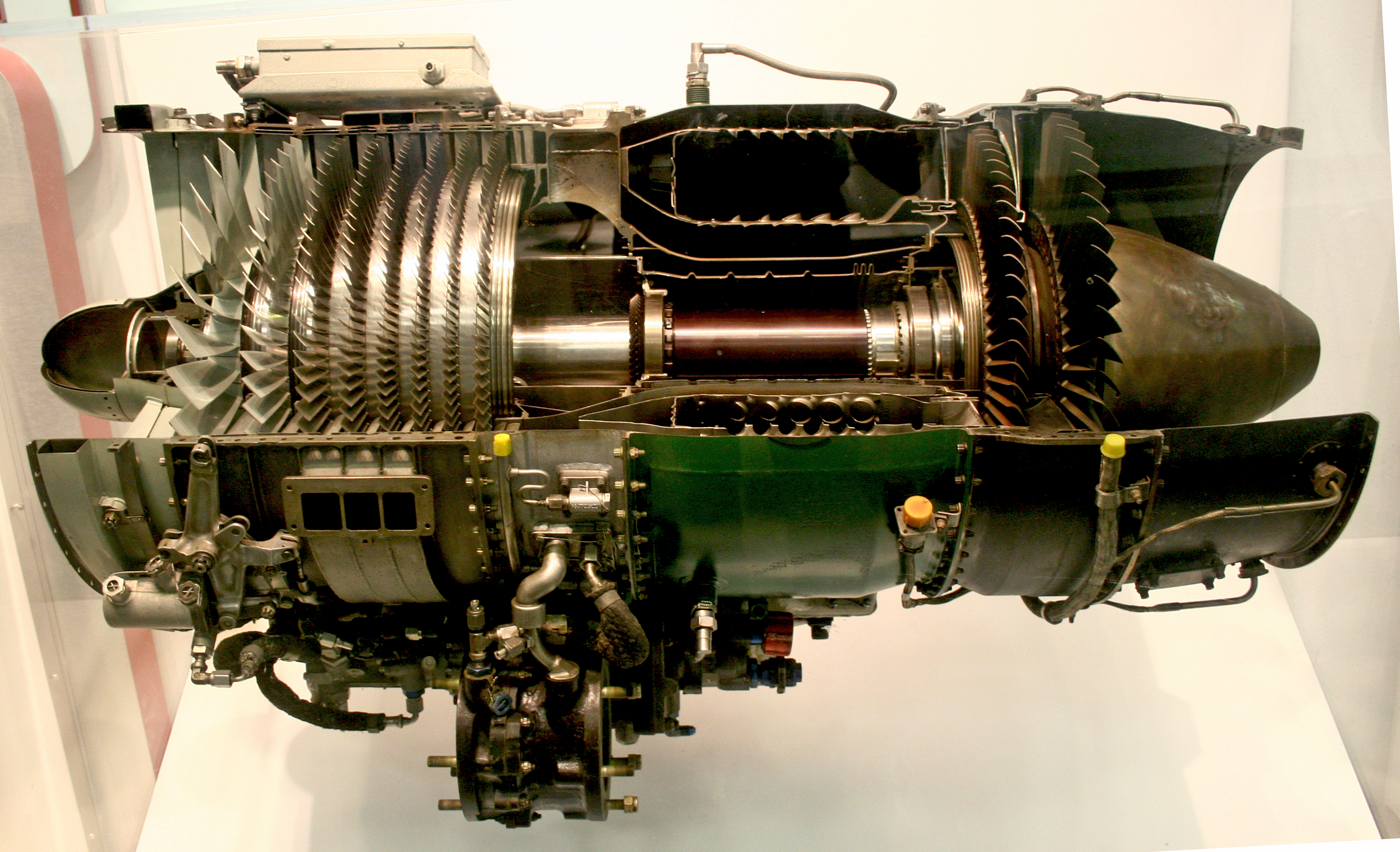
- The CJ610 is derived from the military J85, pictured
- Type: Turbojet
- National origin: United States
- Manufacturer: General Electric
- First run: 1960s
- Major applications: Learjet 23; Learjet 24; Learjet 25; Learjet 28; Aero Commander 1121; HFB 320 Hansa Jet
- Developed from: General Electric J85
- Developed into: General Electric CF700

The General Electric CJ610 is a non-afterburning turbojet engine derived from the military J85, and is used on a number of civilian business jets. The model has logged over 16.5 million hours of operation. Civilian versions have powered business jets such as the Learjet 23 and the Hamburger Flugzeugbau HFB 320 Hansa Jet. The engines are also used in the flyable Messerschmitt Me 262 reproductions built by the Me 262 Project in the United States.

A development, the CF700, added a rear-mounted fan mounted directly on the free-running low-pressure turbine.

== Variants ==
CJ610-1
2,850 lb_{f} (12.7 kN) thrust
CJ610-2B
2,400 lb_{f} (11 kN) thrust
CJ610-4
2,850 lb_{f} (12.7 kN) thrust
CJ610-6
2,950 lb_{f} (13.1 kN) thrust
CJ610-8A
2,950 lb_{f} (13.1 kN) thrust
CJ610-9
3,100 lb_{f} (14 kN) thrust

== Applications ==
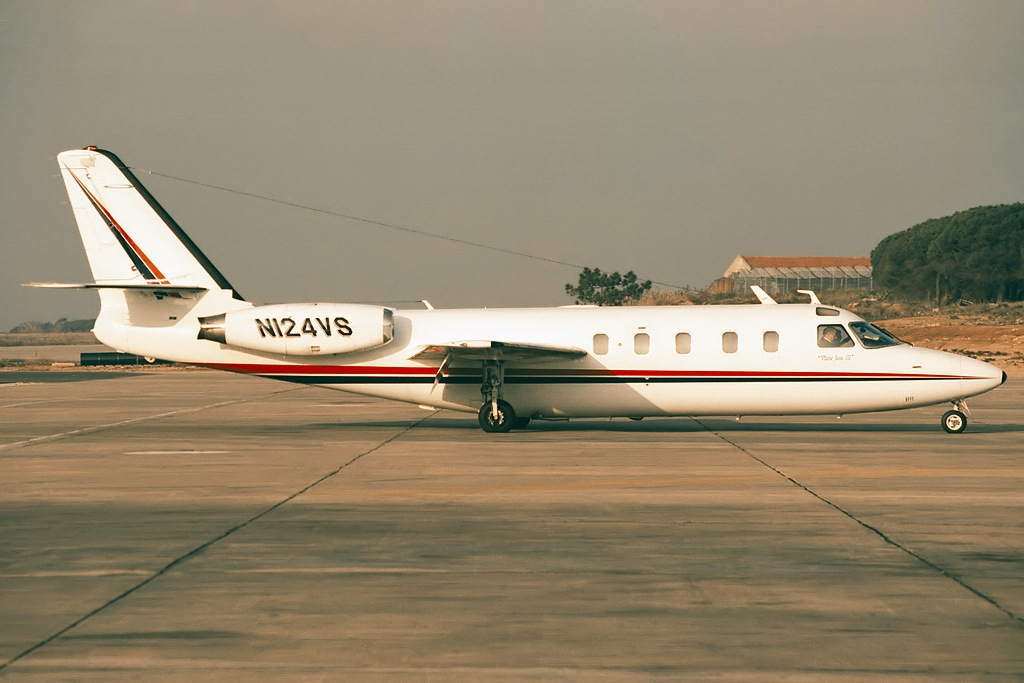
Early 1121 Jet Commanders are powered by thin CJ610 turbojets

- Aero Commander 1121 Jet Commander
- Boom XB-1
- HFB 320 Hansa Jet
- Learjet 23
- Learjet 24
- Learjet 25
- Learjet 28
- Margański & Mysłowski EM-10 Bielik
- Messerschmitt Me 262 replicas A-1c and B-1c.
- Transall C-160 (APU)
- Viper Aircraft Viperjet MKII

=== Other ===
- Screamin' Sasquatch Jet Waco Biplane
- Yak 110

== Specifications (CJ610-9) ==
Data from Jane's All the World's Aircraft 1972-73.

==== General characteristics ====
- Type: Turbojet
- Length: 51.1 in (1.30 m)
- Diameter: 17.7 in (0.45 m)
- Dry weight: 417 lb (189 kg)

==== Components ====
- Compressor: 8-stage axial flow
- Combustors: Annular combustion chamber
- Turbine: 2-stage

==== Performance ====
- Maximum thrust: 3,100 lbf (14 kN) (takeoff)
- Specific fuel consumption: 0.98 lb/(lbf·hr)
- Thrust-to-weight ratio: 7.4

== See also ==
Related development

- General Electric J85
- General Electric CF700

Comparable engines

- Rolls-Royce Viper

Related lists

- List of aircraft engines

== Bibliography ==
- Gunston, Bill (2006). World encyclopedia of aero engines: From the pioneers to the present day (5th ed.). Thrupp, Gloucestershire, UK: Sutton Publishing. ISBN 978-0-7509-4479-3.
- Taylor, John W. R. (1972). Jane's all the world's aircraft. 1972-73: 63rd year. London: Jane's Yearbooks. ISBN 0-354-00109-4. OCLC 655668894.
