= Learjet 23 =

1966 business jet aircraft

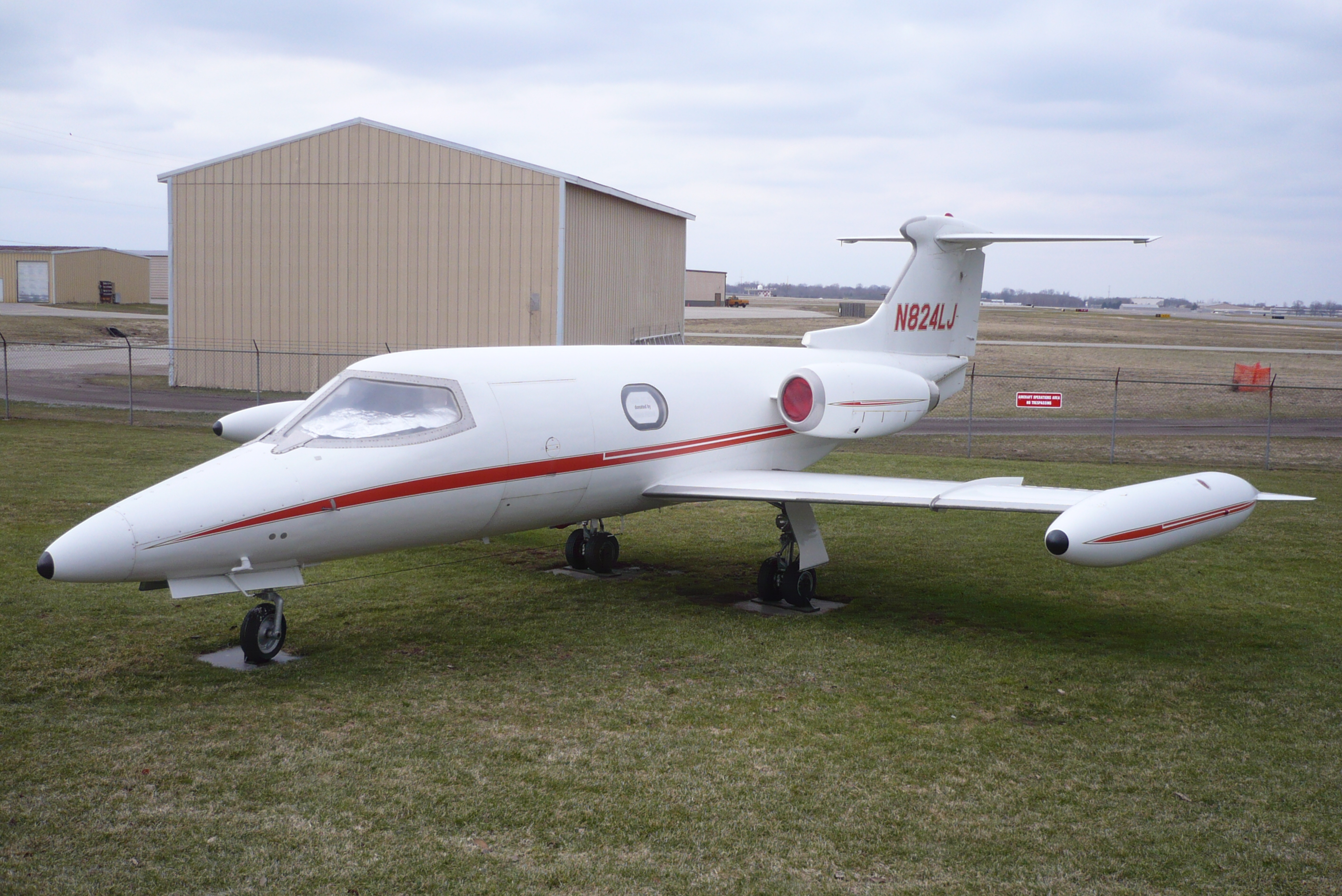

General information
- Type: Business jet
- Manufacturer: Learjet
- Designer: William Powell Lear, based on a design by Dr.eng. Hans-Luzius Studer
- Status: One flyable airframe
- Number built: 101

History
- Manufactured: 1964–1966
- Introduction date: 13 October 1964
- First flight: 7 October 1963
- Developed into: Learjet 24

The Learjet 23 (originally Lear Jet 23) is an American six-to-eight-seat (two crew and four to six passengers) twinjet, high-speed business jet manufactured by Learjet. Introduced in 1964, it was Learjet's first model and created a new market for fast and efficient small business aircraft. Production ended in 1966 after 101 aircraft had been delivered.

== Development ==
Recognizing the potential of the FFA P-16 fighter jet, a Swiss single-engine ground-attack plane designed by Flug- und Fahrzeugwerke Altenrhein (FFA), William (Bill) Powell Lear, Sr. established Swiss American Aviation Corporation (SAAC) to produce a two-engined passenger version: the SAAC-23 Execujet. The company moved to Wichita, Kansas and was renamed Lear Jet Corporation. Production began on the first Model 23 Lear Jet on 7 February 1962. The first flight took place on 7 October 1963 with test pilots Hank Beaird and Bob Hagen. On 4 June 1964, the prototype crashed soon after takeoff, when the pilot inadvertently deployed the wing spoilers while demonstrating an engine failure on takeoff. Eventually determined to be pilot error, this mishap did not deter the Federal Aviation Agency (later the Federal Aviation Administration) from awarding the Lear Jet 23 its type certificate on 31 July 1964. On 13 October 1964, the first production aircraft was delivered.

Production ended in 1966 after one hundred and one aircraft had been delivered. In 1998, thirty nine Model 23s were estimated to remain in use. Twenty seven are known to have been lost or damaged beyond repair through accidents, the most recent being in 2008. As of 2025, there is only a single Learjet 23 that remains flyable. Registered as N477K, it was the 36th Model 23 built, having been manufactured in 1965. It is also the only Learjet 23 to be equipped with Stage 3 compliant hush kits.

=== Noise compliance ===
In 2013, the FAA modified 14 CFR part 91 rules to prohibit the operation of jets weighing 75,000 pounds (34,000 kg) or less that are not stage 3 noise compliant after 31 December 2015. The Learjet 23 is listed explicitly in Federal Register 78 FR 39576. Any Learjet 23s that have not been modified by installing Stage 3 noise compliant engines or have not had hushkits installed for non-compliant engines will not be permitted to fly in the contiguous 48 states after 31 December 2015. 14 CFR § 91.883 Special flight authorizations for jet airplanes weighing 75,000 pounds or less – lists special flight authorizations that may be granted for operation after 31 December 2015.

== Aircraft on display ==
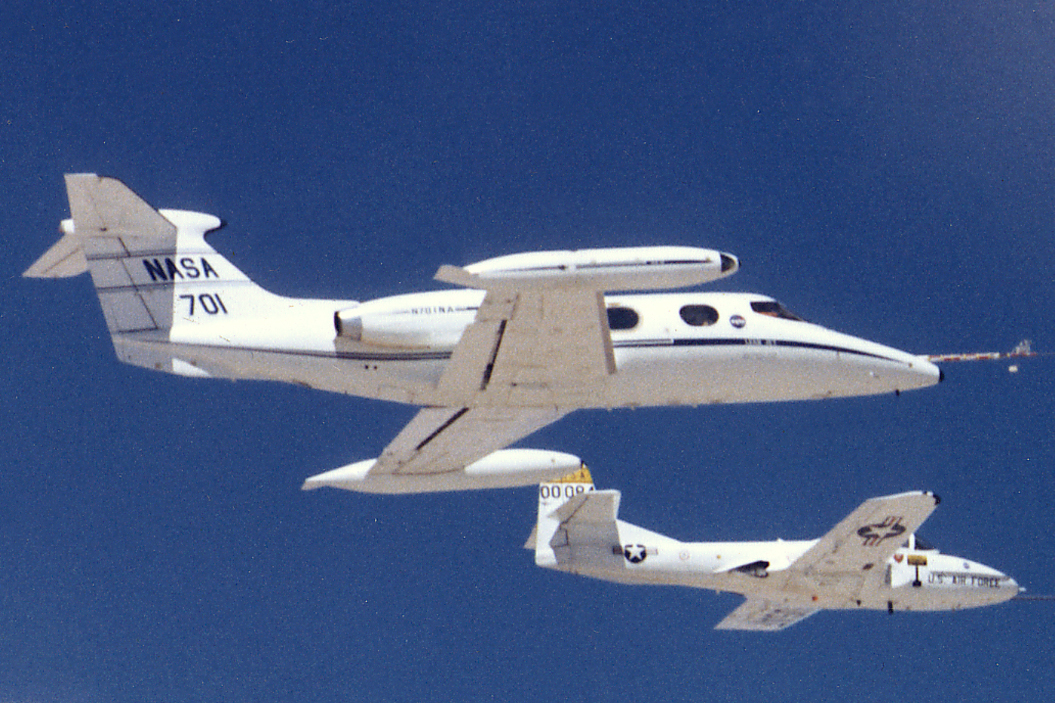
NASA Learjet 23 chase aircraft

- N802L – Model 23 on static display at the Udvar-Hazy Center of the National Air and Space Museum in Chantilly, Virginia.
- N505PF – Model 23 on static display at the Kansas Aviation Museum in Wichita, Kansas.
- N20EP – on display outside White Industries, Bates City, Missouri.
- N23BY – Model 23 on display at the Arkansas Air & Military Museum in Fayetteville, Arkansas. This airframe was flown by Bobby Younkin in air shows.
- N154AG – Model 23 on static display at the Museum of Flight in Seattle, Washington.
- N73CE – Model 23 on display at the Yanks Air Museum in Chino, California.
- N824LJ – Model 23 on static display at the Air Zoo in Portage, Michigan.
- N88B – Model 23 on static display at the Pima Air and Space Museum in Tucson, Arizona.
- N119BA – Model 23 on static display at the Valiant Air Command Museum in Titusville, Florida.

== Operators ==
United States

- NASA
- Executive Jet Aviation

== Accidents and incidents ==
- On November 14, 1965, a Paul Kelly Flying Service Learjet 23 crashed 13.1 miles east of PSP at night when the aircraft lost control and crashed in a 55-degree nose-down vertical left bank attitude due to spatial disorientation of the pilot. Both crew and all six passengers died.
- On November 29, 1967, a Learjet 23 operated by Jet International crashed on approach to Orlando Executive Airport during an emergency landing, 7/10 of a mile SW of the airport because of fuel transfer problems and stalled and entered a spin on a go-around, crashing into a private home. All 3 occupants died.
- On May 9, 1970, a NetJets Learjet 23 had a controlled flight into terrain while landing at Pellston-Emmet County Airport (IATA: PLN, ICAO: KPLN, FAA LID: PLN). UAW President Walter Reuther, his wife May, and architect Oscar Stonorov were killed in the crash.
- On January 6, 1977, a Learjet 23 operated by Jet Avia crashed while on a runway 27 localizer back course approach in snow and a low ceiling. A failure to maintain airspeed was the probable cause. Both occupants were killed.
- On 7 April 1981, a Learjet 23 was damaged by a bird strike after taking off from the airport and forced to return for an emergency landing. The copilot was killed and the pilot seriously injured.
- On March 30, 1983, a Learjet 23 operated by Hughes Charter Air, a night check courier flight, crashed on landing at EWR during an unstabilized approach. Both crewmembers were killed. Marijuana was later found in their systems, believed to have impaired judgement.
- On June 4, 1984, a Learjet 23 operated by Air Continental crashed on approach to runway 33 at Bradley Intl due to asymmetric retraction of the spoilers, two crew and one passenger were killed.

== Specifications ==
Data from Jane's All The World's Aircraft 1965–66

General characteristics

- Crew: Two pilots
- Capacity: 6 passengers
- Length: 43 ft 3 in (13.18 m)
- Wingspan: 35 ft 7 in (10.84 m)
- Height: 12 ft 7 in (3.84 m)
- Wing area: 231.2 sq ft (21.48 m^{2})
- Empty weight: 6,150 lb (2,790 kg)
- Max takeoff weight: 12,499 lb (5,669 kg)
- Powerplant: 2 × General Electric CJ610-4 turbojet engines, 2,850 lbf (12.7 kN) thrust each

Performance

- Maximum speed: 561 mph (903 km/h, 487 kn) at 24,000 ft (7,300 m)
- Maximum speed: Mach 0.82
- Cruise speed: 518 mph (834 km/h, 450 kn) at 40,000 ft (12,000 m)
- Stall speed: 104 mph (167 km/h, 90 kn) wheels and flaps down
- Range: 1,830 mi (2,950 km, 1,590 nmi) max fuel at 485 mph (781 km/h; 421 kn) and 40,000 ft (12,000 m)
- Service ceiling: 45,000 ft (14,000 m)
- Rate of climb: 6,900 ft/min (35 m/s)

== See also ==
Related development

- Rogers P-51R, a custom-built racing aircraft with the wings and horizontal stabilizer of a Learjet 23

Related lists

- List of aircraft
