= Lunar Landing Research Vehicle =

Apollo human lunar landing training vehicle

Lunar Landing Research Vehicle (LLRV)
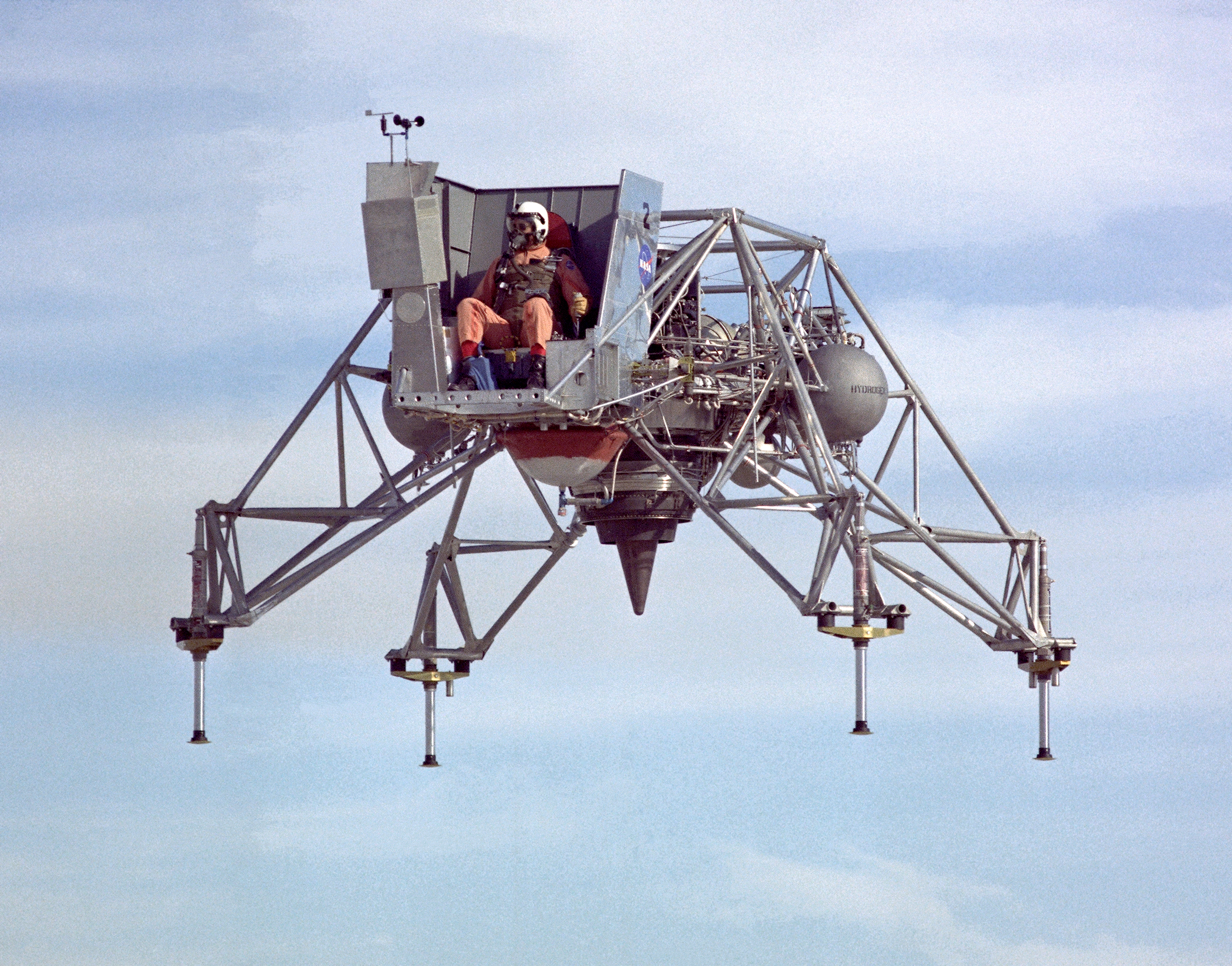
- Lunar Landing Research Vehicle No. 2 in flight, January 1967

General information
- Type: Experimental VTOL aircraft
- Manufacturer: Bell Aerosystems
- Primary user: NASA
- Number built: 2 LLRVs; 3 LLTVs

History
- First flight: 30 October 1964

The Bell Aerosystems Lunar Landing Research Vehicle (LLRV, nicknamed the Flying Bedstead) was a Project Apollo era program to build a simulator for the Moon landings. The LLRVs were used by the FRC, now known as the NASA Armstrong Flight Research Center, at Edwards Air Force Base, California, to study and analyze piloting techniques needed to fly and land the Apollo Lunar Module in the Moon's low gravity environment.

The research vehicles were vertical take-off vehicles that used a single jet engine mounted on a gimbal so that it always pointed vertically. It was adjusted to cancel 5/6 of the vehicle's weight, and the vehicle used hydrogen peroxide rockets which could fairly accurately simulate the behavior of a lunar lander.

Success of the two LLRVs led to the building of three Lunar Landing Training Vehicles (LLTVs), an improved version of the LLRV, for use by Apollo astronauts at the Manned Spacecraft Center in Houston, Texas, predecessor of NASA's Johnson Space Center. One LLRV and two LLTVs were destroyed in crashes, but the rocket ejection seat system safely recovered the pilot in all cases.

The final phase of every Apollo landing was manually piloted by the mission commander. Because of landing site selection problems, Neil Armstrong, Apollo 11 commander, said his mission would not have been successful without extensive training on the LLTVs. Selection for LLTV training was preceded by helicopter training. In a 2009 interview, astronaut Curt Michel stated, "For airborne craft, the helicopter was the closest in terms of characteristics to the lunar lander. So if you didn't get helicopter training, you knew you weren't going. That sort of gave it away." Even Tom Stafford and Gene Cernan did not get LLTV training for their Apollo 10 mission which was the first flight of the Lunar Module to the Moon, because NASA "didn't have plans to land on Apollo 10" so "there wasn't any point in ... training in the LLTV." Cernan only got this training after being assigned as backup commander for Apollo 14, and in 1972 was the last to fly the LLTV while training as commander for Apollo 17, the final landing mission.

== History ==
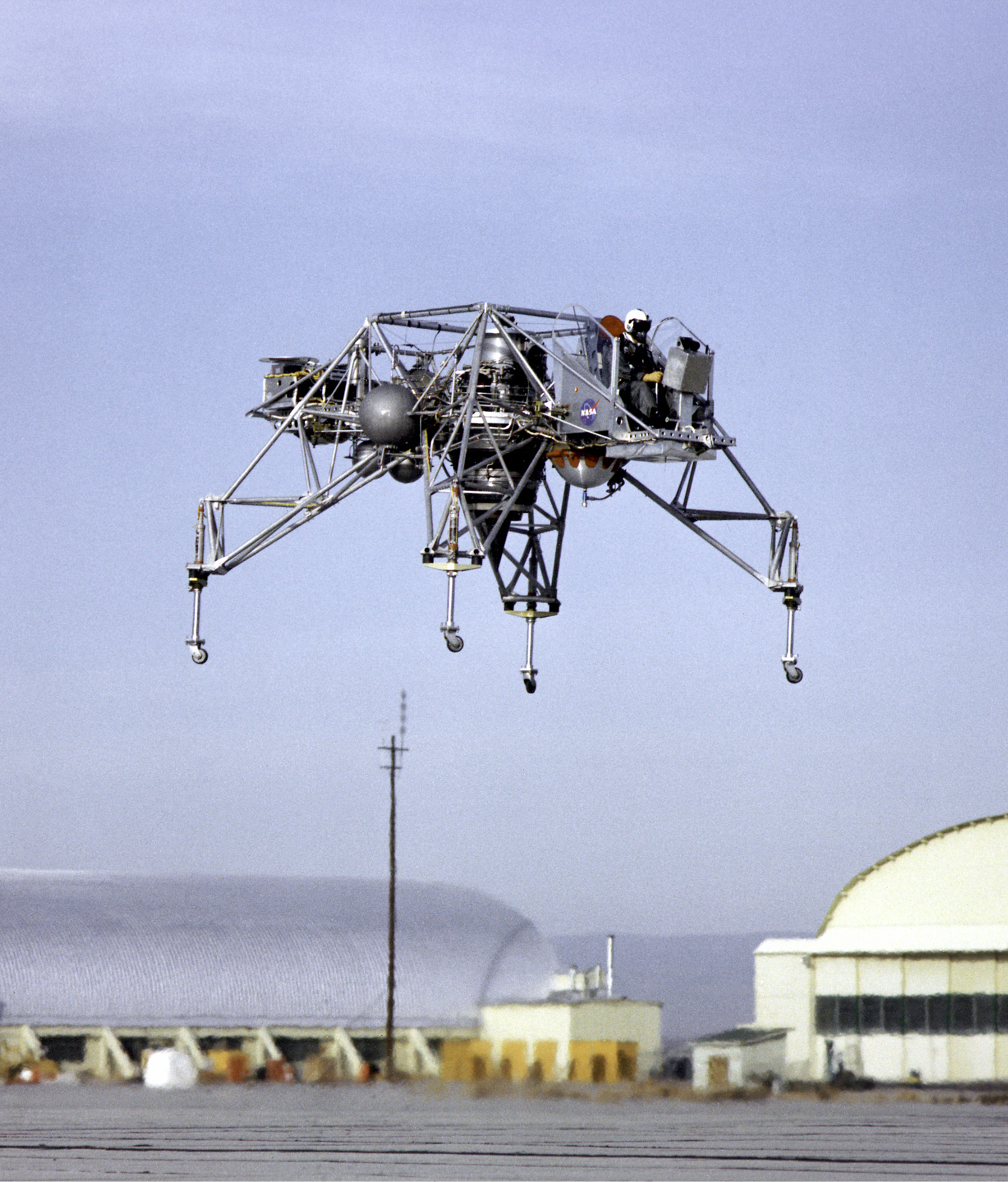
LLRV-1 at Edwards AFB is tested before acceptance by NASA

Built of aluminum alloy trusses, the LLRVs were powered by a General Electric CF700-2V turbofan engine with a thrust of 4,200 lbf (19 kN), mounted vertically in a gimbal. The engine lifted the vehicle to the test altitude and was then throttled back to support five-sixths of the vehicle's weight, simulating the reduced gravity of the Moon. The vehicle's rate of descent and horizontal movement were controlled by two hydrogen peroxide lift rockets with thrust that could be varied from 100 to 500 lbf (440 to 2,200 N). Sixteen smaller hydrogen peroxide thrusters, mounted in pairs, gave the pilot control in pitch, yaw and roll.

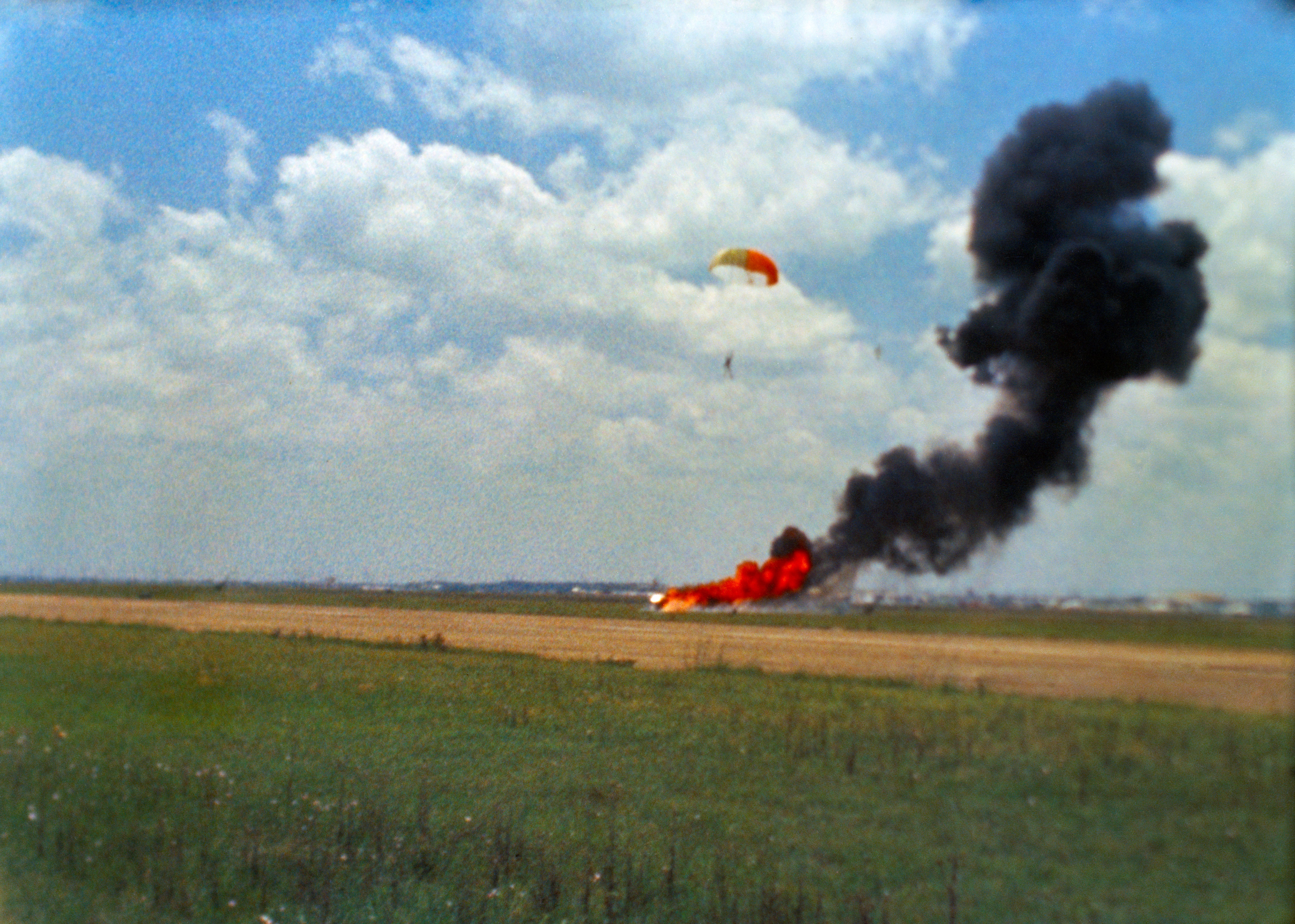
Neil Armstrong floats safely to the ground as LLRV-1 crashes at Ellington Air Force Base, 6 May 1968.

The LLRV's pilot sat in an ejection seat manufactured by Weber Aircraft LLC. On activation, it propelled the pilot upward from the vehicle with an acceleration of roughly 14 times the force of gravity for about a half second. From the ground, it could propel the seat and pilot to an altitude of about 250 feet (80 m), where the pilot's parachute would be automatically deployed. It was one of the first zero-zero ejection seats, capable of saving the operator even if the aircraft was stationary on the ground, a necessity given the LLRV's low and slow flight envelope.

After conceptual planning and meetings with engineers from Bell Aerosystems, Buffalo, New York, a company with experience in vertical takeoff and landing (VTOL) aircraft, NASA issued Bell a $50,000 study contract in December 1961. Bell had independently conceived a similar, free-flying simulator, and out of this study came the NASA Headquarters' endorsement of the LLRV concept, resulting in a $3.6 million production contract to Bell on February 1, 1963, for delivery of the first of two vehicles for flight studies at the FRC within 14 months.

LLRV-1 was shipped from Bell to FRC in April. LLRV-2 was also shipped at the same time, but in parts. Because of a potential cost overrun, FRC Director Paul Bickle decided to have it assembled and tested at FRC. The emphasis then was on LLRV-1. It was first readied for flight on a tilt table constructed at FRC to evaluate its engine operation without actually flying it. The scene then shifted to the old South Base area of Edwards.

The first three flights of #1 were made on October 30, 1964, by FRC senior research test pilot Joe Walker. He flew test flights through December 1964, after which flights were shared with Don Mallick, also a FRC research pilot, and Jack Kleuver, the Army's senior helicopter test pilot. Familiarization flights were also made by Joseph Algranti and H.E. Ream, pilots with NASA Manned Spacecraft Center (later Johnson Space Center).

Modifications were later made to the cockpits of both LLRVs to better simulate the actual Lunar Module. These included the addition of the LM's three-axis hand controller and throttle. A Styrofoam cockpit enclosure was also added to simulate the pilot's restricted view in the LM.

The final LLRV flight at FRC took place on November 30, 1966. In December 1966, vehicle #1 was shipped to Houston, followed by #2 in January 1967. During the preceding two years, a total of 198 flights of LLRV-1 and six flights of LLRV-2 had been flown without a serious accident.

The first LLRV flight by Neil Armstrong was made in vehicle #1 on March 27, 1967 from its base at a corner of Ellington Air Force Base, the headquarters for Johnson Space Center's aircraft operations. Joe Algranti, chief of JSC's Aircraft Operations Division, and test pilot H.E. Ream also made flights that month. Both observed, as did Armstrong and the other astronauts, that if a serious control problem developed, the pilot had little choice but to eject, since the vehicle only operated to a maximum altitude of 500 feet (150 m).

On May 6, 1968, Armstrong was forced to use LLRV-1's ejection seat from about 200 feet (60 m) altitude after a control problem, and had about four seconds on his full parachute before landing on the ground unhurt. LLRV-1 was lost. The accident investigation board found that the fuel for the vehicle's attitude control thrusters had run out and that high winds were a major factor. As a result, JSC management decided to terminate further LLRV flights, as the first LLTV was about to be shipped from Bell to Ellington to begin ground and flight testing.

LLRV-2 (NASA 951) was eventually returned to the Armstrong Flight Research Center, where it is on display as an artifact of the center's contribution to the Apollo program.

=== Lunar Landing Training Vehicle ===
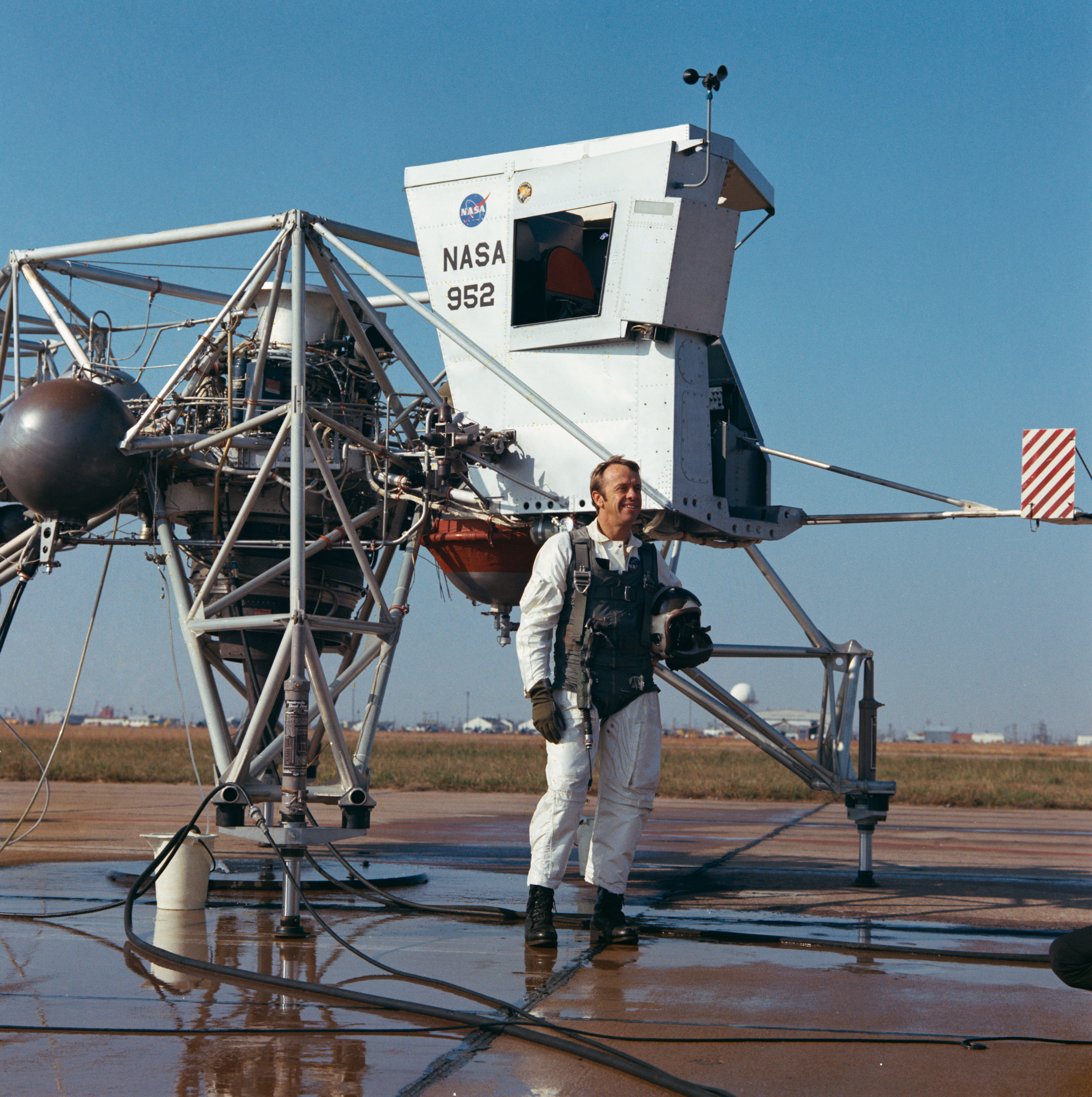
Alan Shepard during training for the Apollo 14 mission stands in front of LLTV-3.

Negotiations between JSC and Bell Aerosystems for three LLTVs (LLTV-1 to 3), an improved training version of the LLRV, were initiated in October 1966 and a $5.9 million contract for three vehicles was finally signed in March 1967.

In June 1968, the first vehicle (LLTV-1) was delivered by Bell to Ellington to begin its ground and flight testing by JSC's Aircraft Operations Division (AOD). AOD's head, Joe Algranti, was the principal test pilot for its first flight in August 1968. Flight testing continued until December 8, when Algranti lost control of LLTV-1 during a flight to expand the vehicle's speed envelope. He managed to eject just three-fifths of a second before the vehicle hit the ground, the close call believed to be as a result of his attempt to regain control.

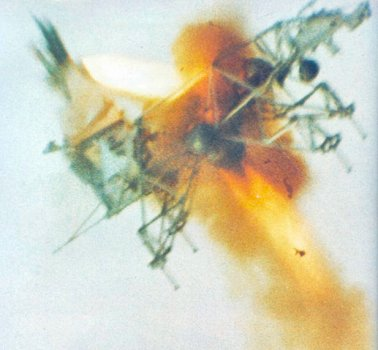
Test pilot Stuart Present ejects safely from crashing LLTV-2, 29 January 1971.

The accident investigation found that the ground controllers had elected not to monitor in real time the attitude thrusters that controlled the vehicle's yaw motion, and, at the velocity Algranti was flying, the thrusters had been overpowered by the LLTV's aerodynamic forces, causing Algranti to lose control. Due to tight cost constraints on the LLRV and LLTV, wind tunnel testing had been avoided in favor of careful flight testing for evaluation of the vehicles' aerodynamic characteristics. After reviewing the results of the crash investigation, however, it was decided that the third LLTV (LLTV-3) be loaded into NASA's Super Guppy and flown to the Langley Research Center in Virginia for testing in its full-scale wind tunnel. Testing was initiated on January 7, 1968 and ended one month later on February 7.

It was quickly determined that the cause of the divergence was the Styrofoam cockpit enclosure. As the vehicle's sideslip angle reached minus two degrees, a yawing force rapidly built up that exceeded the ability of the yaw thrusters to counteract. The fix decided on was simply to remove the top of the enclosure, thus venting it and eliminating the excessive yawing force. It was also possible from the wind tunnel results to develop a preliminary flight envelope for the LLTV, defining its allowable maximum airspeed at various angles of angle of attack and sideslip. All this had to be verified by flight test, however, since it was not possible in the tunnel to obtain good data with the engine running.

A high-level LLTV Flight Readiness Review Board was appointed on March 5, 1969, by JSC Director Dr. Robert Gilruth. It consisted of him as chairman, with board members Chris Kraft, head of Mission Operations; George Low, head of JSC's Apollo Program; Max Faget, JSC's Director of Engineering and astronaut Deke Slayton, Director of Flight Crew Operations. The board reviewed the wind tunnel results, and on March 30 gave approval for the resumption of test flights in LLTV-2. The test program of 18 flights, all flown by H.E. Ream, was successfully completed on June 2. Hence, in the month before the Apollo 11 launch Armstrong was able to complete his LLTV flight training. He commented after his return:

Eagle (the Lunar Module) flew very much like the Lunar Landing Training Vehicle which I had flown more than 30 times at Ellington Air Force Base near the Space Center. I had made from 50 to 60 landings in the trainer, and the final trajectory I flew to the landing was very much like those flown in practice. That, of course, gave me a good deal of confidence — a comfortable familiarity.

In Armstrong's 2005 authorized biography First Man: The Life of Neil A. Armstrong, astronaut Bill Anders is quoted as describing the LLTV as "a much unsung hero of the Apollo Program". Although Armstrong had to eject from the LLRV, no other astronaut ever had to eject from the LLTV, and every Lunar Module pilot through the final Apollo 17 mission trained in the LLTV and flew to a landing on the Moon successfully.

In January 1971 LLTV-2 was destroyed while testing a major modification to the computer system. Its test pilot, Stuart Present, was able to eject safely.

Gene Cernan piloted the surviving LLTV-3 vehicle on November 13, 1972, three weeks before Apollo 17. LLTV-3 (NASA 952) is now on display at the Johnson Space Center.

== Lunar Sim Mode ==
There were two distinct modes of flight for the LLRV and LLTV. The basic mode was with the engine fixed so that it remained 'normal' with respect to the body.

In the gimbaled "Lunar Sim Mode," the free-gimbaled turbofan engine was allowed to swivel and was kept pointing downward to Earth's center of mass regardless of the LLRV's attitude; this allowed the vehicle to tilt at the far greater angles that would be typical of hovering and maneuvering above the lunar surface. Despite its ungainly appearance, the LLRV was equipped with a highly sophisticated array of early sensors (mainly Doppler radar) and computational hardware. The system had no specific name, but the effect it produced was called "Lunar Sim Mode." This was the highest degree of hardware-based simulation. It was not a system to unburden the pilot, as an autopilot does, nor was it meant to introduce any sort of safety or economy.

Lunar Sim Mode can also be thought of as a mixture of stability augmentation, recalculation of vertical acceleration according to the lunar gravity constant, all followed by accompanied instantaneous corrective action. The LLRV's Lunar Sim Mode was even able to correct for wind gusts within milliseconds, as they would have disturbed the impression of a missing atmosphere.

FRC test pilot Don Mallick's comments following the vehicle's first flight in the lunar simulation mode illustrate the experience of piloting the LLRV:

As a general statement concerning the translation ability on earth versus the translational ability in the lunar simulation; the vehicle is reduced from a very positive high response vehicle to a very low or weak response vehicle. I'm sure with training and experience the pilot will be able to increase the overall vehicle-pilot performance once he adapts to the low translational accelerations that are available, as well as the lag that follows along with the anticipation that is required to properly control the vehicle. Even with this training, the pilot is faced with the situation of about 5/6 of his translational maneuvering performance removed from that on earth which is a marked change.

Deke Slayton, then NASA's Chief Astronaut, later said there was no way to simulate a Moon landing except by flying the LLRV.

== Specifications (LLRV) ==
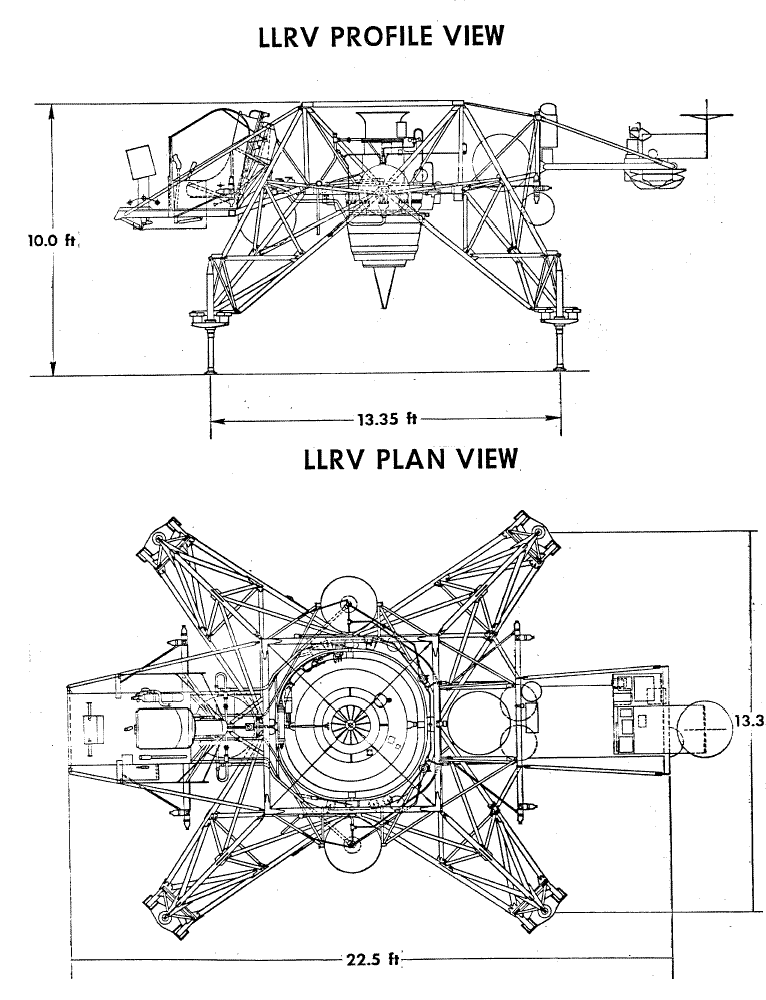

General characteristics

- Crew: 1
- Length: 22 ft 6 in (6.85 m)
- Width: 15 ft 1 in (4.6 m)
- Height: 10 ft 0 in (3.05 m)
- Empty weight: 2,510 lb (1,139 kg)
- Gross weight: 3,775 lb (1,712 kg)
- Max takeoff weight: 3,925 lb (1,780 kg)
- Powerplant: 1 × General Electric CF700-2V turbofan (aft-fan CJ610), 4,200 lbf (19 kN) thrust
- Powerplant: 2 × Hydrogen peroxide rocket engines, 100 lbf (0.44 kN) thrust each to 500 lbf (2,200 N) throttleable
- Powerplant: 6 × solid-fuelled rocket engines, 500 lbf (2.2 kN) thrust each safety standby engines

Performance

- Maximum speed: 35 kn (40 mph, 65 km/h)
- Endurance: 10 minutes
- Service ceiling: 6,000 ft (1,800 m)
- Rate of climb: 3,600 ft/min (18 m/s)
- Thrust/weight: 1.07

== Control system ==
The electronic control system for the Lunar Landing Training Vehicle was developed for NASA by Bell Aerosystems, Inc. which had engineering facilities in Niagara Falls, New York. All the controls were analog circuits using Burr-Brown transistor amplifier modules and other analog components.

The system had redundant channels that used 2-of-2 logic: the outputs of each primary channel were compared continuously, and if a fault was detected in the primary control system, control was automatically switched to an identical backup channel and the pilot immediately took measures to bring the vehicle to the ground.

== Aircraft on display ==
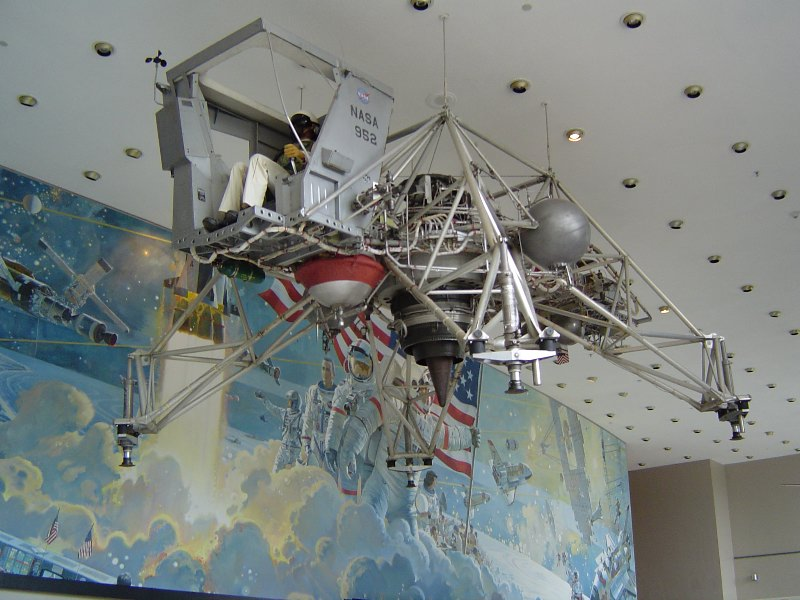
LLTV-3 (LLTV NASA 952) on display at the Johnson Space Center

Two of the five vehicles survive:

- LLRV-2 (LLRV NASA 951) is on display at the Air Force Flight Test Museum at Edwards Air Force Base. It was lent to the museum by NASA in 2016.
- LLTV-3 (LLTV NASA 952) is on display at the Johnson Space Center.
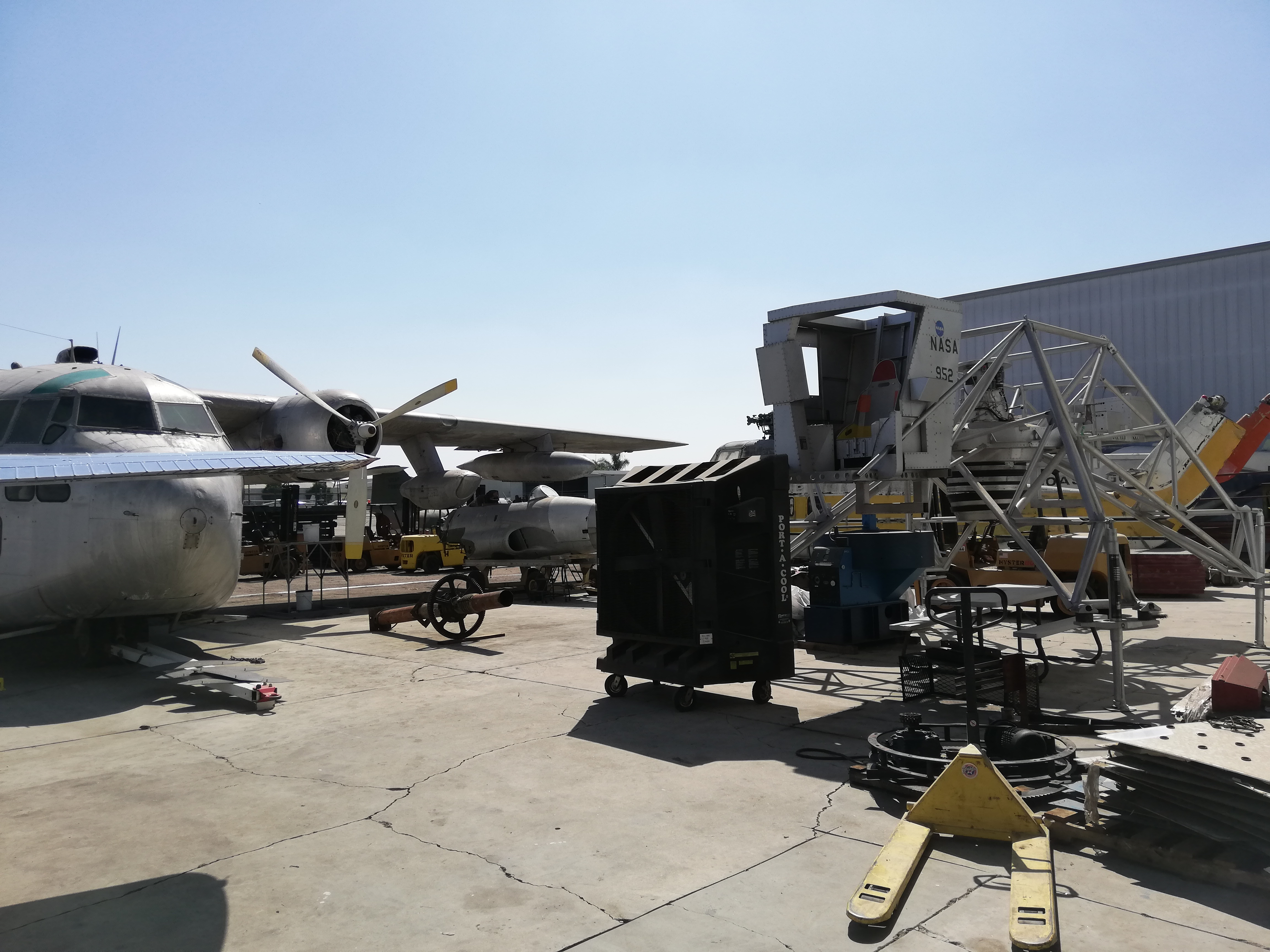
- Replica of NASA 952 (visible on the right), at the Yanks Air Museum
  Another vehicle, a replica of NASA 952, is in a partially complete state in the aircraft boneyard at the Yanks Air Museum.

== See also ==
- Lunar Landing Research Facility
- List of spaceflight-related accidents and incidents

Aircraft of comparable role, configuration, and era

- Aérospatiale Ludion
- Rolls-Royce Thrust Measuring Rig from 1953
- VFW SG 1262 Schwebegestell

Related lists

- List of VTOL aircraft
