= Boeing Model 853-21 Quiet Bird =

Reconnaissance plane prototype by Boeing

Model 835-21 Quiet Bird

General information
- Type: US Army observation study
- Manufacturer: Boeing
- Number built: 1/2 scale mockup produced

The Boeing Model 853-21 Quiet Bird was a US Army reconnaissance plane study developed by Boeing in the early 1960s from their Model 831. It was an early example of stealth technology, especially electromagnetic low-observability.

== Design and development ==
Development of the Model 853-21 began in 1962 at Boeing Wichita, only a 1/2 scale prototype was produced which never flew, but tests showed that it had a very low radar cross-section (stealth aircraft).

== Specifications ==
Data from Boeing

General characteristics

- Crew: 1
- Length: 33 ft 0 in (10.06 m)
- Wingspan: 33 ft 7.8 in (10.26 m)
- Height: 7.7 ft (2.3 m)
- Wing area: 179.5 sq ft (16.67 m^{2})
- Airfoil: 65A415
- Empty weight: 6,000 lb (2,721 kg)
- Gross weight: 8,150 lb (3,696 kg)
- Powerplant: 1 × General Electric CF700 , 4,200 lbf (19 kN) thrust

Performance

- Stall speed: 80 kn (92 mph, 150 km/h)
- Range: 1,160 nmi (1,330 mi, 2,150 km)
- Service ceiling: 47,000 ft (14,000 m)
- Rate of climb: 3,050 ft/min (15.5 m/s)
- Wing loading: 45.4 lb/sq ft (221 kg/m^{2})
- Thrust/weight: 0.52

== See also ==
Related development

- Boeing Bird of Prey

Aircraft of comparable role, configuration, and era

- Lockheed Have Blue
- Northrop Tacit Blue
