= Me 262 Project =

Warbird replica manufacturer

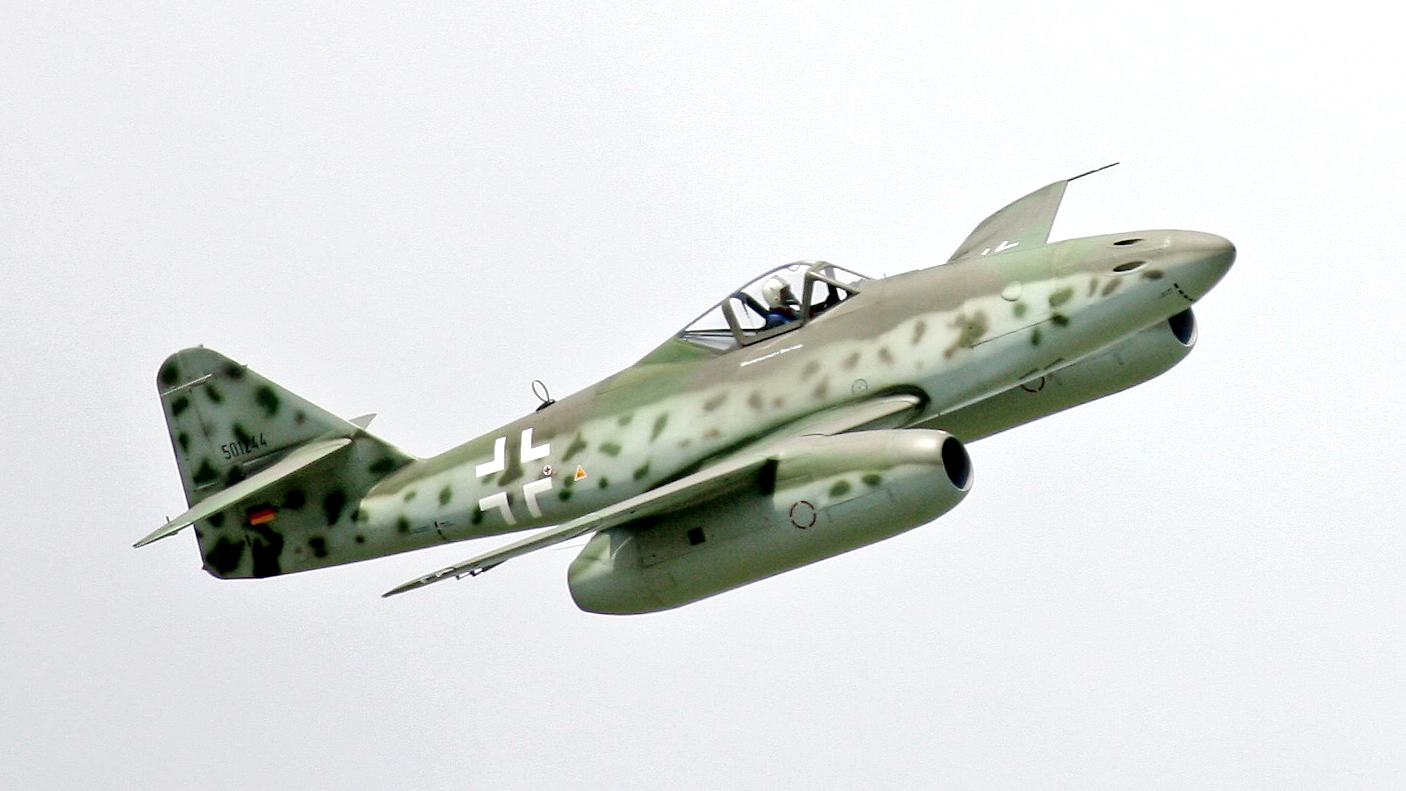
Reproduction Messerschmitt Me 262 W.Nr.501244 produced by the project in 2006

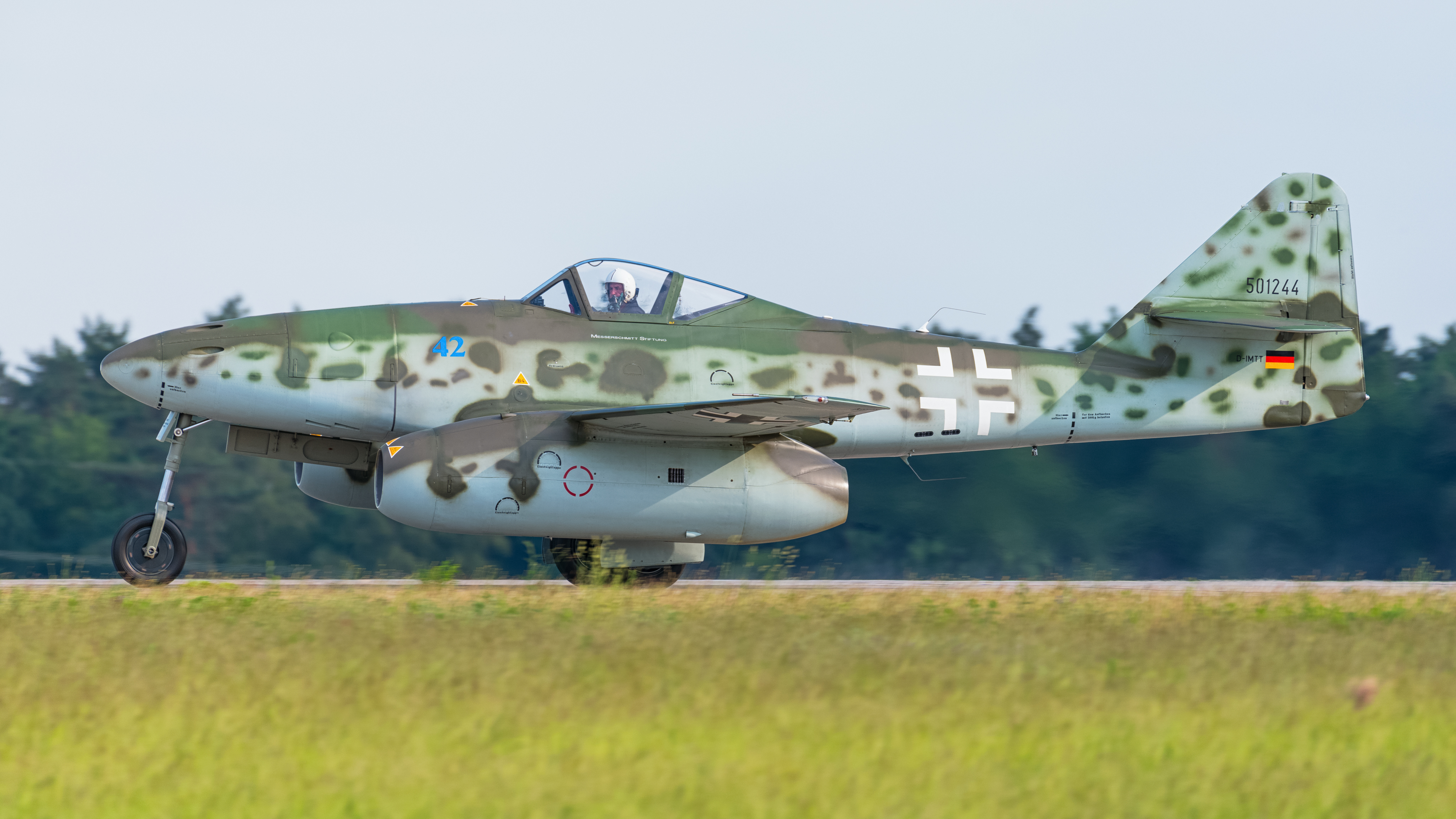
Reproduction Messerschmitt Me 262 W.Nr.501244 operated as D-IMTT at the Berlin Air Show 2016

The Me 262 Project is a company formed to build flyable reproductions of the Messerschmitt Me 262, the world's first operational jet fighter. The project was started by the Texas Airplane Factory and administered by Classic Fighter Industries. It is based at Paine Field in Everett, Washington, United States, near Seattle. The project team of designers, engineers, and technicians completed the flight test program in 2012 and delivery of the first of five jets.

The aircraft are powered by General Electric CJ610 turbojet engines, concealed inside detailed reproductions of the original Junkers Jumo 004B engines and nacelles.

== Production ==
Five aircraft were built:

- Me 262B-1c
  - W.Nr.501241 reg.N262AZ, Collings Foundation, Houston, Texas, US, in flying condition. First replica to fly, 20 December 2002.
  - W.Nr.501242, on static museum display Evergreen Aviation Museum, McMinnville, Oregon, US. In the markings of an aircraft of Jadgeschwader 7 (11/JG-7) based at Brandenburg-Briest, flown by Leutnant Alfred Ambs.
- Me 262A/B-1c
  - W.Nr.501243 reg.N262MF at Military Aviation Museum, Virginia Beach, Virginia, US, in airworthy condition.
  - W.Nr.501244 reg.D-IMTT, Messerschmitt Stiftung, Manching, Germany, in airworthy condition.
