= General Electric CF700 =

Turbofan aircraft engine

CF700
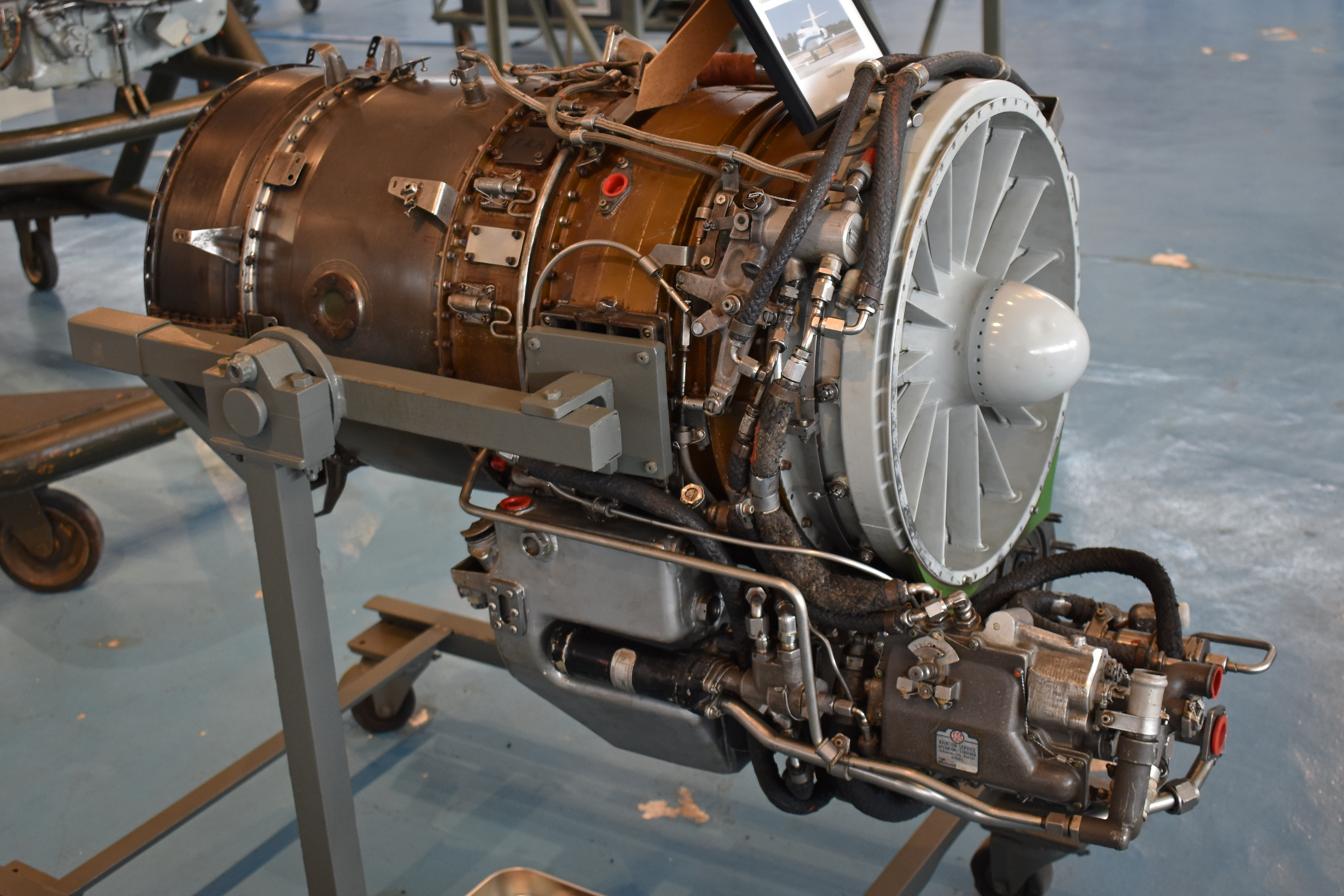
- A CF700 engine core on display at the Museu do Ar.
- Type: Turbofan
- National origin: United States
- Manufacturer: General Electric
- First run: 1960s
- Major applications: Dassault Falcon 20; North American Sabreliner
- Developed from: General Electric CJ610

The General Electric CF700 (military designation TF37) is an aft-fan turbofan development of the CJ610 turbojet. The fan blades are an extension of the low-pressure turbine blades.

== Variants ==
CF700-2B
Baseline aft-fan CJ610 variant rated at 4,200 lbf (19,000 N) for take-off
CF700-2V
The 2B modified for continuous vertical operation on the Lunar Landing Research Vehicle (LLRV) and Lunar Landing Training Vehicle (LLTV)
TF37-GE-1
Military version of the CF700-2V on the Boeing Model 853-21 Quiet Bird

== Applications ==
- Boeing Model 853-21 Quiet Bird
- Dassault Falcon 20
- North American Sabreliner Series 75A and 80
- Lunar Landing Research Vehicle/Lunar Landing Training Vehicle

== Specifications (CF700) ==
Data from

==== General characteristics ====
- Type: Two-spool aft-fan turbofan
- Length: 75.5 in (1,918 mm)
- Diameter: 33 in (838 mm)
- Dry weight: 735 lb (333.4 kg) with optional thrust reverser

==== Components ====
- Compressor: 8 stage high pressure compressor + 1 stage fan directly driven by the free LP turbine
- Turbine: 2 stage high pressure turbine, 1 stage low pressure turbine
- Fuel type: Aviation kerosene

==== Performance ====
- Maximum thrust: 4,550 lbf (20.24 kN)
- Bypass ratio: 2.0:1
- Air mass flow: 84 lb/s (38 kg/s) through the fan
- Specific fuel consumption: 0.67 lb/lbf·hr (68.3·kg/kN·h) at maximum cruising speed
- Thrust-to-weight ratio: 6.6

== See also ==
Related development

- General Electric CJ610
- General Electric J85

Comparable engines

- General Electric CJ805-23

Related lists

- List of aircraft engines
