= Learjet 24 =

Business jet aircraft

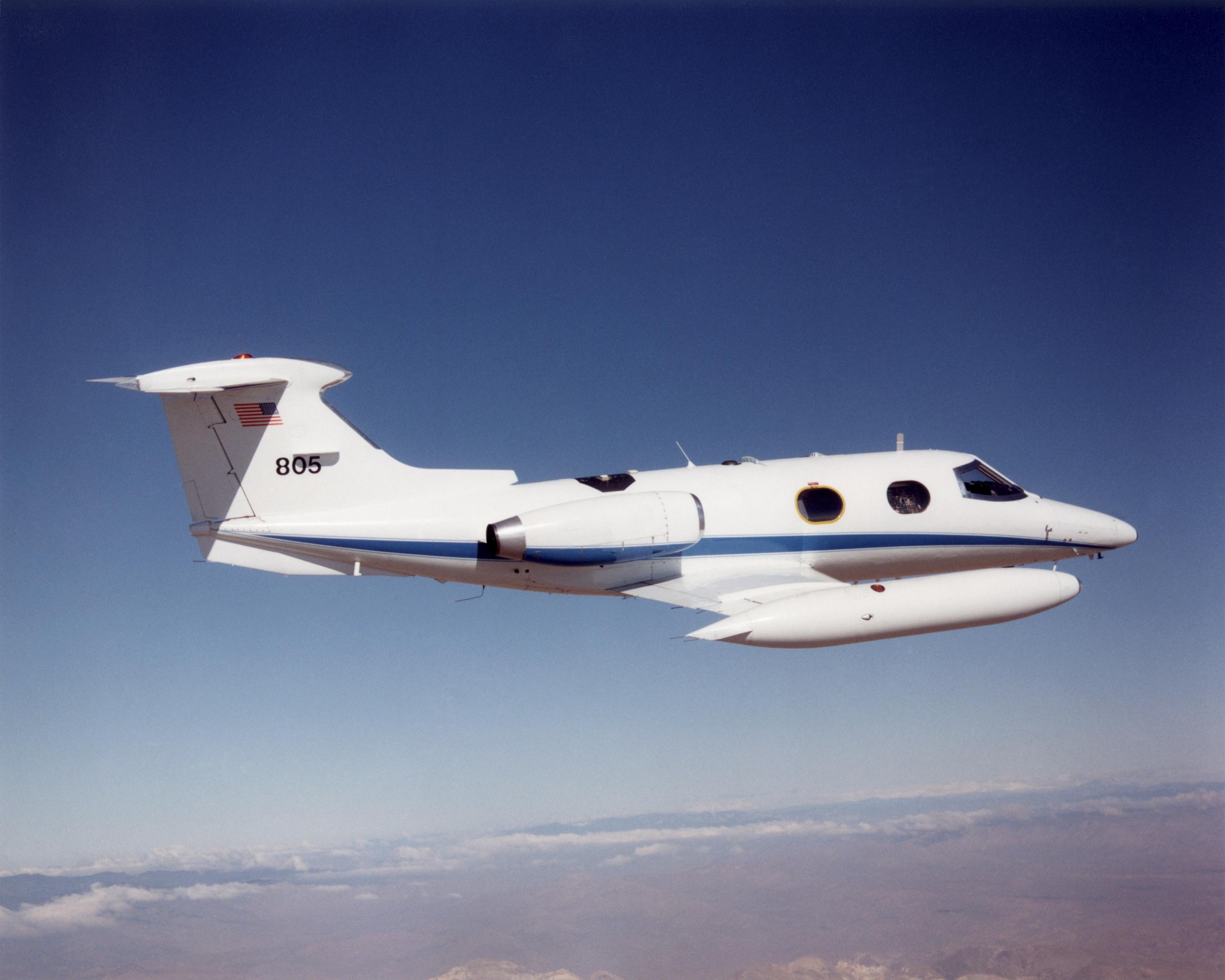
- NASA Learjet 24

General information
- Type: Business jet
- Manufacturer: Learjet
- Status: Active
- Number built: 259

History
- Manufactured: 1966–1977
- Introduction date: November 9, 1966
- First flight: January 24, 1966
- Developed from: Learjet 23
- Developed into: Learjet 25

The Learjet 24 is an American six-to-eight-seat (two crew and four to six passengers) twin-engine, high-speed business jet, which was manufactured by Learjet as the successor to the Learjet 23.

== History ==
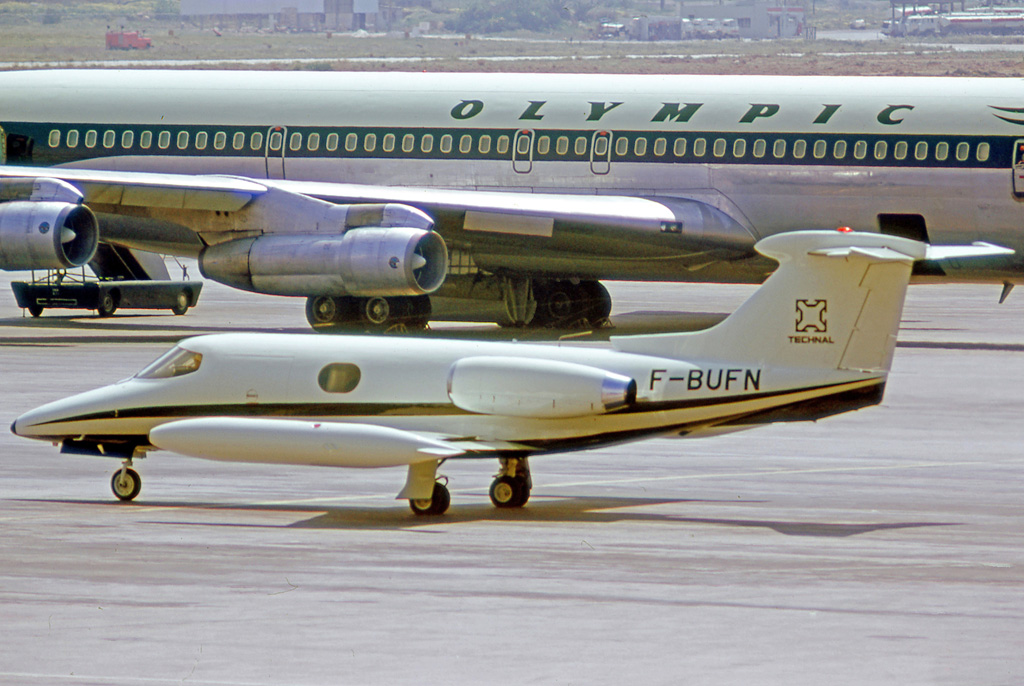
Learjet 24B registered in France and operated by a corporate owner. Athens Airport 1973

The Learjet 24 was designed as an improved version of the Learjet 23, which was limited to 12,500 pounds (5,700 kg) gross weight. Engineers designed the model 24 to accept up to the full 13,500 pounds (6,100 kg) gross weight permitted by FAR-25 standards.

Other improvements introduced in the Learjet 24 included:

- increased cabin pressurization, to allow a higher operating altitude
- the addition of one extra window on the right side of the cabin
- more powerful engines
- a new windshield
- auxiliary fuel in wing tip tanks
- a fire-extinguishing system for the engines

With these changes, the LJ24 became the first business jet to be certified under FAR-25.

The first flight of a Learjet 24 took place on January 24, 1966. From May 23 to 26, 1966, a Learjet 24 flew around the world in 50 hours and 20 minutes flying time as a demonstration of its capabilities. Different variants were the 24A, B, C, D, E and F, with changes of takeoff weight, in-fuselage fuel tank, range, cabin and engines.

Altogether 259 Model 24s were built, and in 2001, there were still 210 Learjet 24s in use. Thirty-nine LJ24s have been lost through accidents.

== Noise compliance ==
In 2013, the FAA modified 14 CFR part 91 rules to prohibit the operation of jets weighing 75,000 pounds or less that are not stage 3 noise compliant after December 31, 2015. The Learjet 24 is listed explicitly in Federal Register 78 FR 39576. Any Learjet 24s that have not been modified by installing Stage 3 noise compliant engines or have not had "hushkits" installed for non-compliant engines will not be permitted to fly in the contiguous 48 states after December 31, 2015. 14 CFR §91.883 Special flight authorizations for jet airplanes weighing 75,000 pounds or less – lists special flight authorizations that may be granted for operation after December 31, 2015.

== Variants ==
=== Learjet 24A ===
Standard version. Converted from existing Learjet 23. Takeoff weight 13,499 pounds (6,123 kg). FAA certified on November 9, 1966. 81 aircraft built.

=== Learjet 24B ===
Improved variant, powered by two 2,950 lbf (13.1 kN) thrust General Electric CJ610-6 turbojet engines, and 13,499 pounds (6,123 kg) maximum take-off weight. FAA certified December 17, 1968. 49 aircraft built.

=== Learjet 24C ===
A light-weight version of the 24B, fuselage tank not fitted which would have caused a reduction in range. The Learjet 24C project was abandoned in December 1970. Take-off weight 5,675 kilograms (12,511 lb). None built.

=== Learjet 24D ===
Similar to Learjet 24C, however by changing surface tanks range and takeoff weight were increased to 6,129 kilograms (13,512 lb). Round cabin windows replaced by angular. FAA certified July 17, 1970. Replaced the 24B in production. A reduced gross weight (restricted to 12,500 pounds (5,700 kg) version was also available (the 24D/A). 99 built.

=== Learjet 24D/A ===
Light-weight version with a restricted take-off weight of 5,669 kg (12,500 lb).

=== Learjet 24E and 24F ===
Two new versions were announced in 1976 the 24E and 24F, they introduced a new cambered wing and aerodynamic improvements to reduce stall and approach speed (Century III wing). The 24E did not have a fuselage fuel tank for higher payload but shorter range. Some 24E models had the fuselage tank installed later to restore range. Powered by two 2,950 lbf (13.1 kN) thrust General Electric CJ610-8A turbojet engines. On April 15, 1977, the FAA approved extended ceiling to 51,000 feet (16,000 m), the highest level then achieved in civilian aviation. 29 aircraft built.

== Operators ==
Mainly used by private individuals and corporations, one aircraft was used by NASA as the Learjet Observatory.

== Accidents and incidents ==
On January 6, 1977, Dolly Sinatra, the mother of Frank Sinatra, was one of four killed when Learjet 24 N12MK crashed into a mountain following a departure from Palm Springs Airport, United States.

== Aircraft on display ==
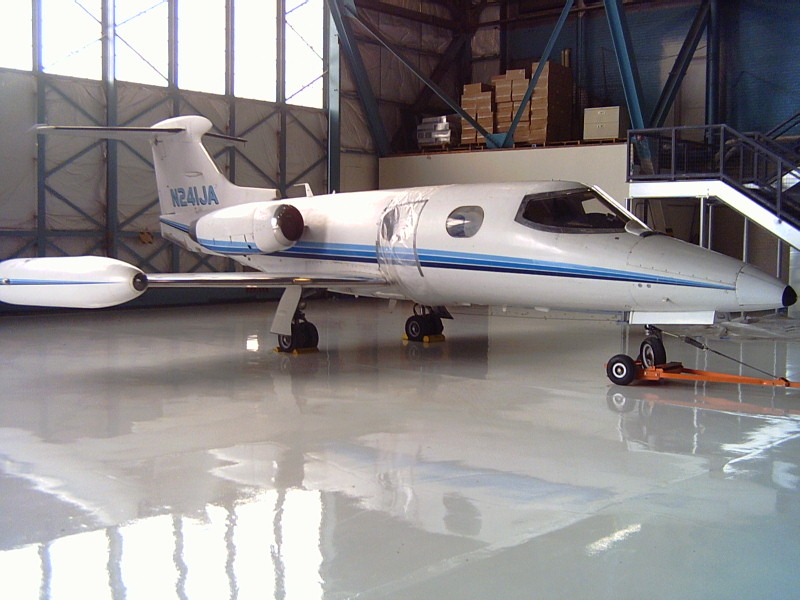
Learjet 24 s/n 131 at Wings Museum. April 2011

- 055 – Learjet 24 on static display at the Tillamook Air Museum in Tillamook, Oregon.
- 24-131 – Learjet 24 on static display at Wings Over the Rockies Air and Space Museum in Denver, Colorado.
- 193 – Learjet 24B on display at the Dakota Territory Air Museum in Minot, North Dakota.
- 203 – Learjet 24B on static display at the Evergreen Aviation & Space Museum in McMinnville, Oregon.
- 281 – Learjet 24D on display at the Frontiers of Flight Museum in Dallas, Texas.
- Learjet 24D on display at ITE College Central
- 163 - Learjet 24F on display at Lewis University in Romeoville, Illinois. Formerly owned by Arnold Palmer from 1968-1976. Donated to Lewis By Waste Management in 1986 for use by maintenance students in their Aviation Department.

== Specifications (Learjet 24F) ==
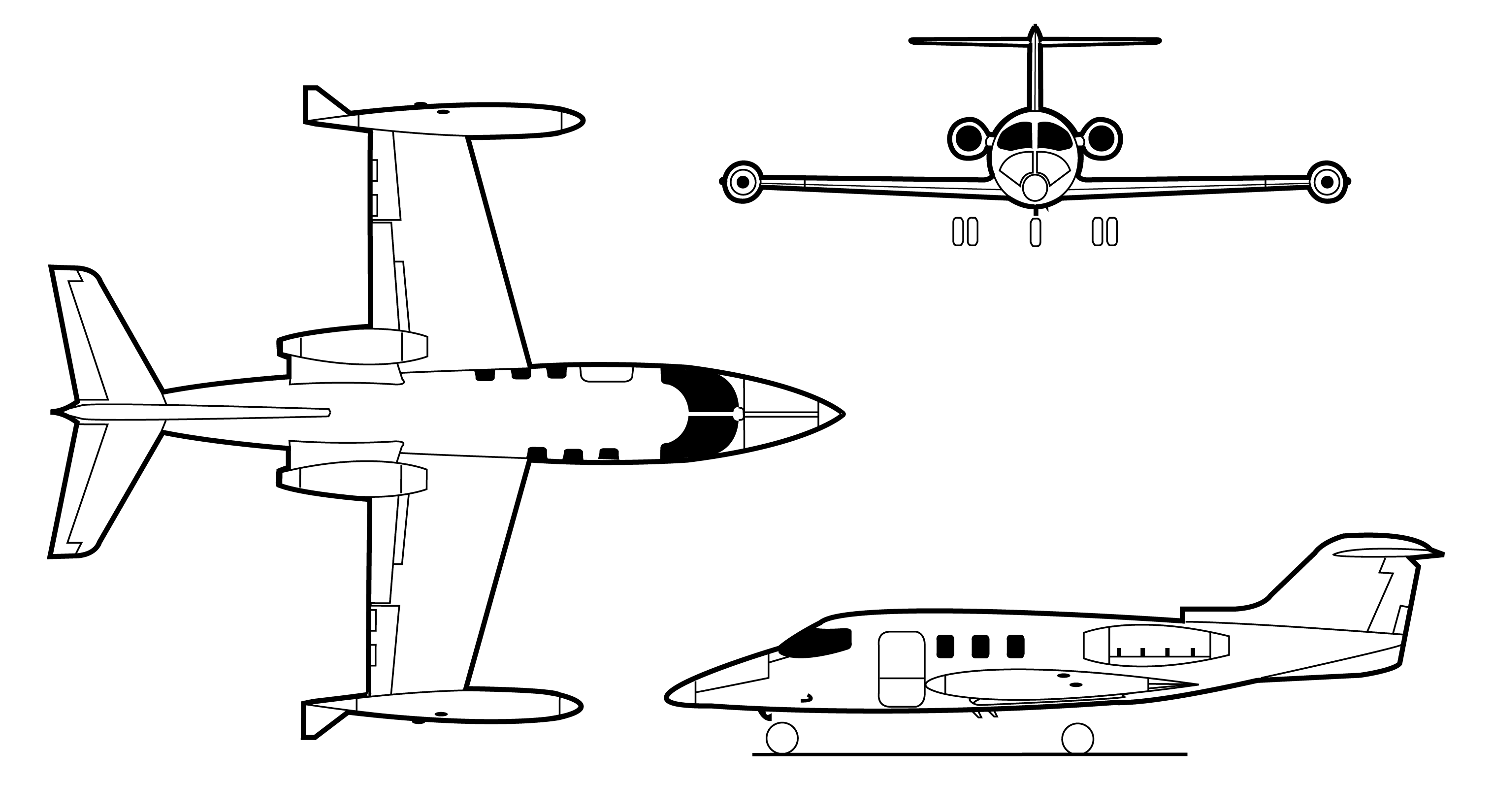
3-view line art

Data from Jane's All The World's Aircraft 1976–77

General characteristics

- Crew: Two (pilot & co-pilot)
- Capacity: 6 passengers
- Length: 43 ft 3 in (13.18 m)
- Wingspan: 35 ft 7 in (10.85 m) (over tip-tanks)
- Height: 12 ft 3 in (3.73 m)
- Wing area: 231.77 sq ft (21.532 m^{2})
- Aspect ratio: 5.01:1
- Airfoil: NACA 64A109
- Empty weight: 7,130 lb (3,234 kg)
- Max takeoff weight: 13,500 lb (6,123 kg)
- Fuel capacity: 840 US gal (700 imp gal; 3,200 L)
- Powerplant: 2 × General Electric CJ610-6 turbojets, 2,950 lbf (13.1 kN) thrust each

Performance

- Maximum speed: 545 mph (877 km/h, 474 kn) at 31,000 ft (9,400 m)
- Never exceed speed: Mach 0.86
- Cruise speed: 481 mph (774 km/h, 418 kn) at 45,000 ft (14,000 m) (econ cruise)
- Stall speed: 100 mph (160 km/h, 87 kn) (gear and flaps down) - IAS
- Range: 1,695 mi (2,728 km, 1,473 nmi) 4 passengers, max fuel, 45 min reserves
- Service ceiling: 45,000 ft (14,000 m)
- Rate of climb: 6,800 ft/min (35 m/s)
- Takeoff length to 35 ft (11 m): 2,800 ft (850 m)
- Landing distance from 50 ft (15 m): 2,450 ft (750 m)

== See also ==
- 1988 Mexico Learjet 24 crash
- 1999 South Dakota Learjet 35 crash

Related development

- Learjet 23
- Learjet 25

Aircraft of comparable role, configuration, and era

- North American Sabreliner
