= Learjet 28 =

Business jet aircraft

Learjet 28/29
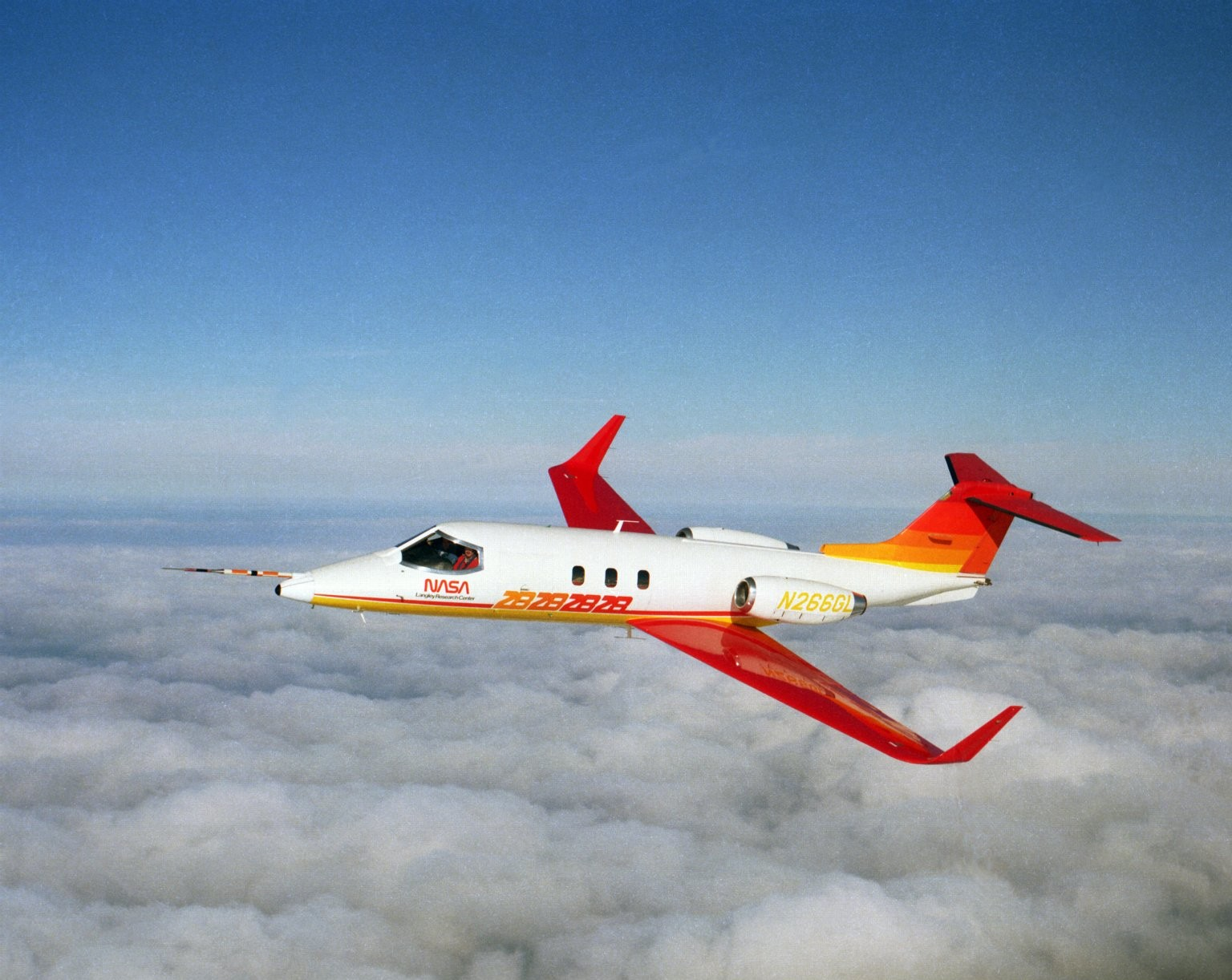

General information
- Type: Business jet
- Manufacturer: Learjet
- Status: Retired
- Number built: 9

History
- Manufactured: 1977–1982
- First flight: August 24, 1977
- Developed from: Learjet 25
- Developed into: Learjet 31

The Learjet 28 is an American eight-to-ten-seat (two crew and six to eight passengers), twin-engine, high-speed business jet, intended to be the successor to the Learjet 25. The Learjet 29 is identical except for the addition of a long-range fuel tank, resulting in the reduction of the capacity to six (two crew and four passengers). Both were manufactured by Learjet and were marketed under the Longhorn name.

== History ==
The first flight of the Learjet 28 took place on August 24, 1977. The Learjet 28/29 was based on the Learjet 25, and received a completely new wing fitted with winglets which resulted in improved performance and fuel economy. The new wing was designed for the Learjet 55, and the Learjet 28 was originally planned to be a testbed for the wing, not a production type, but after the prototypes demonstrated excellent climb performance and the ability to operate at 51,000 ft (16,000 m) (the first business jet to do so), it was decided to offer the Learjet 28 and 29 as production aircraft. FAA certification was awarded to both the Learjet 28 and 29 on January 30, 1979.

The Learjet 28/29 was the first production jet aircraft to utilize winglets (entering service in 1977).

Both models were commercially unsuccessful, showing reduced range compared to the Learjet 31, as the addition of winglets required the deletion of the earlier model's wingtip tanks, and they sold mainly to customers with a requirement for good altitude performance. Only five production Learjet 28s, and four Learjet 29s, were constructed before production ceased in August 1982. Both types were subsequently replaced by the Learjet 31.

The first production aircraft was used by Neil Armstrong to set five aerospace records.

== Noise compliance ==
In 2013, the FAA modified 14 CFR part 91 rules to prohibit the operation of jets weighing 75,000 pounds or less that are not stage 3 noise compliant after December 31, 2015. The Learjet 28 is listed explicitly in Federal Register 78 FR 39576. Any Learjet 28s that have not been modified by installing Stage 3 noise compliant engines or have not had "hushkits" installed for non-compliant engines will not be permitted to fly in the contiguous 48 states after December 31, 2015. 14 CFR §91.883 Special flight authorizations for jet airplanes weighing 75,000 pounds or less – lists special flight authorizations that may be granted for operation after December 31, 2015.

== Specifications (Learjet 28) ==
Data from Jane's Civil and Military Aircraft Upgrades 1994–95

General characteristics

- Crew: 2
- Capacity: 8 passengers
- Length: 47 ft 7 in (14.51 m)
- Wingspan: 43 ft 10 in (13.35 m)
- Height: 12 ft 3 in (3.73 m)
- Wing area: 264.5 sq ft (24.57 m^{2})
- Empty weight: 8,267 lb (3,750 kg)
- Gross weight: 15,000 lb (6,804 kg)
- Powerplant: 2 × General Electric CJ-610-8A turbojet, 2,950 lbf (13.1 kN) thrust each

Performance

- Maximum speed: 549 mph (884 km/h, 477 kn) at 25,000 ft (7,620 m)
- Cruise speed: 470 mph (760 km/h, 410 kn) — econ cruise at 51,000 ft (15,545 m)
- Stall speed: 103 mph (165 km/h, 89 kn)
- Range: 1,309 mi (2,107 km, 1,137 nmi)
- Service ceiling: 51,000 ft (16,000 m)

== See also ==
Related development

- Learjet 25
- Learjet 31
