= 2012 Nuevo León Learjet 25 crash =

Aviation accident in Mexico

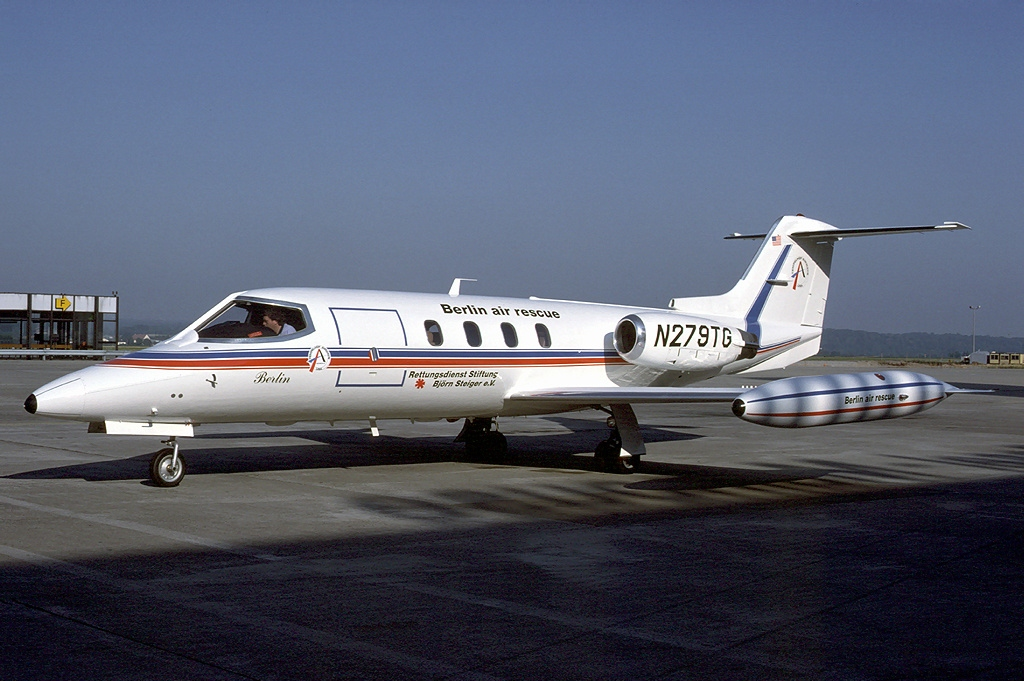
- A Learjet 25 similar to the accident aircraft

Accident
- Date: 9 December 2012
- Summary: Loss of control during climb, and crash
- Site: Near Iturbide, Nuevo León, Mexico; 24.45°N 99.52°W

Aircraft
- Aircraft type: Learjet 25
- Operator: Starwood Management LLC
- Registration: N345MC
- Flight origin: Monterrey International Airport, Mexico
- Destination: Toluca International Airport, Mexico
- Occupants: 7
- Passengers: 5
- Crew: 2
- Fatalities: 7
- Survivors: 0

On 9 December 2012, a Learjet 25 business jet carrying five passengers including Mexican-American singer Jenni Rivera crashed south of Monterrey, Mexico, minutes after taking off from the city's international airport. All aboard, including two crew members, were killed.

The subsequent investigation was unable to determine the cause of the sudden steep descent that led to the aircraft impacting the ground near-vertically at extremely high speed.

== Accident ==
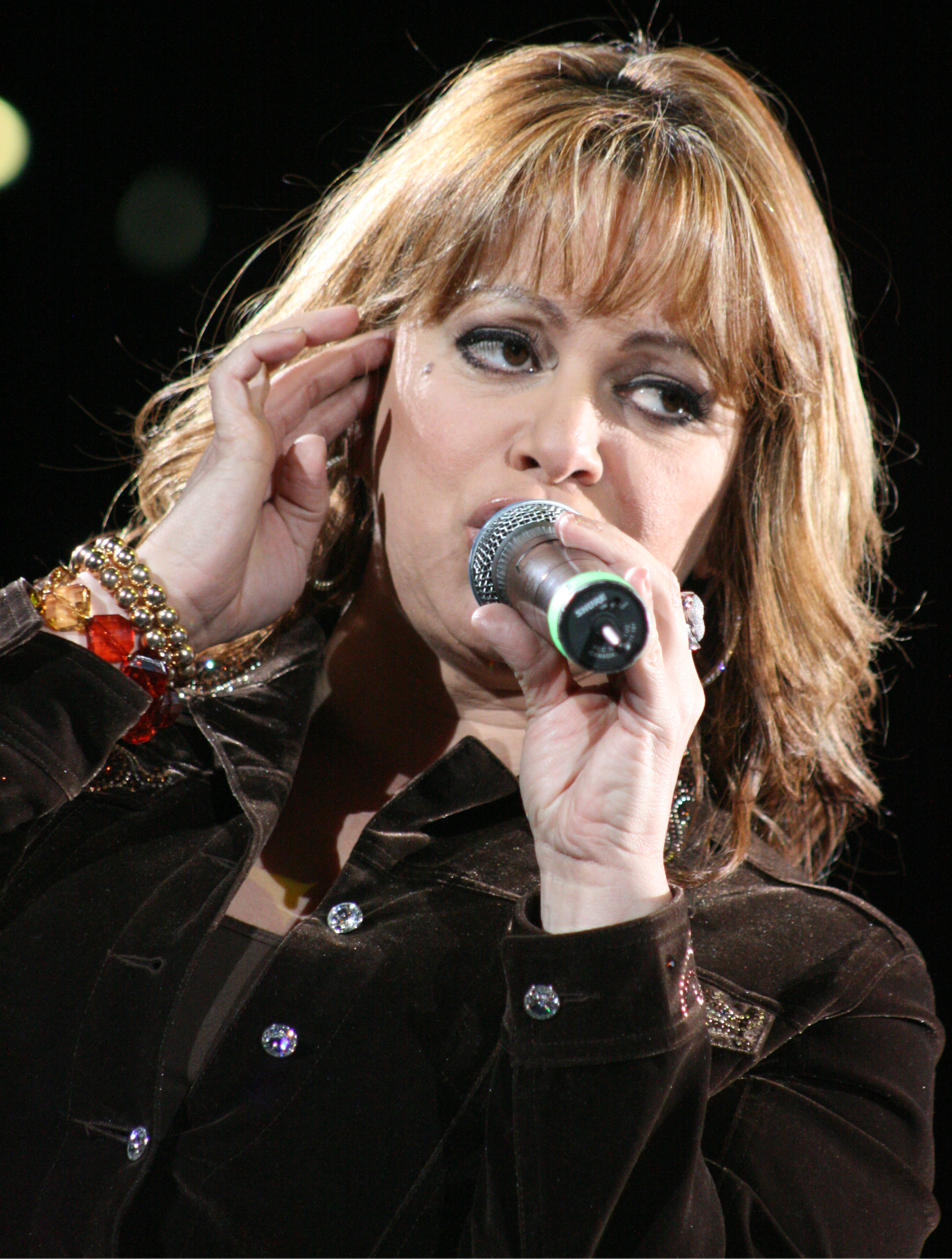
Singer Jenni Rivera, 43, was among the seven fatalities

The Learjet 25 was chartered to fly Rivera along with her makeup artist Jacob Yebale, hairstylist Jorge Armando Sanchez Vasquez, attorney Arturo Rivera and publicist Mario Macias Pacheco from Monterrey to Toluca, near Mexico City, after she performed a concert at the Monterrey Arena. The jet took off from Monterrey International Airport at about 3:20 am local time on 9 December 2012. Around 15 minutes later, while still climbing towards its assigned cruise level, the aircraft suddenly went into a steep descent and disappeared from radar, crashing to the ground. No distress call was received from the crew.

The wreckage was located later in the day near Iturbide, Nuevo León. The aircraft had completely disintegrated on impact. There were no survivors among the seven people on board.

== Aircraft ==
The aircraft was a twin-engine Learjet 25 with US registration N345MC, built in 1969 with serial number 25-046. It was operated by Starwood Management LLC.

In 2005, N345MC had been involved in an incident during which a fuel imbalance developed between the left and right wings' fuel tanks, although no technical fault was found within the fuel system. No one was injured.

== Investigation ==
The investigation into the accident was carried out by the Mexican Directorate General of Civil Aeronautics (DGAC). Since the United States was the state of manufacture and registry of the aircraft, the US National Transportation Safety Board (NTSB) sent an accredited representative to assist with the inquiry.

In December 2014, the DGAC issued its final accident report. The investigation was hampered by the fact that the flight data recorder was destroyed in the impact, and no information could be retrieved. The cockpit voice recorder was never found.

From the analysis of the recorded radar information, it was determined that the Learjet had experienced a sudden loss of control while climbing through 28,000 feet (8,500 m), leading to a nearly vertical high-speed nosedive. The angle of impact with terrain was estimated at 89°, and the impact speed higher than the aircraft's maximum operating speed.

Other flight crews that had previously flown on N345MC had reported occurrences of anomalous vibrations felt on the control column during cruise, leading the investigators to speculate that the sudden nosedive might have been the result of a failure in the horizontal stabilizer, although no hard evidence was found among the badly damaged parts of the system recovered from the wreckage.

Furthermore, the NTSB, after conducting laboratory analysis on the stabilizer's actuator, found no evidence of pre-existing damage or failure, and later issued a comment on the DGAC's findings that there was "no factual data that supports [the hypothesis of a horizontal stabilizer failure]."

The report concluded that the probable cause of the accident was "loss of control of the aircraft for undetermined reasons." It was also established that the flight crew was in breach of local regulations regarding age limits and qualifications. The captain, Miguel Perez Soto, aged 78, had exceeded the maximum age allowed for his role, while the co-pilot, Alejandro Jose Torres, aged 21, did not hold a valid type rating for the Learjet 25.
