= PCN =

PCN or pcn may refer to:

== Arts and entertainment ==
- Pennsylvania Cable Network, non-profit cable television network of Pennsylvania, US
- Personal Computer News, a defunct computer magazine
- PCN (band), a Mexican metal band

== Organisations ==
- Partido de Conciliación Nacional, former name of the National Coalition political party in El Salvador
- Partidul Comuniştilor (Nepecerişti), the Communist Party in Romania

== Science and technology ==
- Pavement classification number, a code classifying types of surface at airports
- Penicillin, a group of β-lactam antibiotics
- Percutaneous nephrolithotomy, a medical procedure to remove kidney stones
- Personal communications network, mobile telephone system, Europe
- Polychlorinated naphthalene, an organic pollutant
- Polycycnis (Pcn), a genus of orchid
- Potato cyst nematode, an agricultural pest
- Process control network, a communications network that transmits instructions and data between control and measurement units and SCADA equipment
- Program Composition Notation, a language for parallel programming

== Other uses ==
- Pecked curvilinear nucleated, in archaeology, a form of prehistoric rock carving
- Penalty Charge Notice, a Fixed Penalty Notice issued by parking attendants and other civil enforcement officers
- Pitcairn Islands, ISO-3166-1 alpha-3 code
- Putnam City North High School
- Post Christum natum (modern Latin: p.C.n., "After the Birth of Christ")
- Personnel Certification in Non-Destructive Testing, maintained by the BINDT in the UK
- Product change notification, document issued by a manufacturers to inform customers about a product change
- Paisley Canal railway station (Station code), Paisley, Scotland
