= Maneuvering area =

Part of an aerodrome to be used by aircraft for takeoff, landing, and taxiing

A maneuvering area (or manoeuvring area in British spelling) is that part of an aerodrome to be used by aircraft for takeoff, landing, and taxiing, excluding aprons and areas designed for maintenance of an aircraft.

== Movement area ==
A movement area, as defined by ICAO, is "That part of an aerodrome to be used for the takeoff, landing and taxiing of aircraft, consisting of the maneuvering area and the apron(s)."

In the United States, the movement area excludes aprons. Federal Aviation Regulations part 139.5 states, "Movement area means the runways, taxiways, and other areas of an airport that are used for taxiing, takeoff, and landing of aircraft, exclusive of loading ramps and aircraft parking areas." At airports/heliports with a tower, specific approval for entry onto the movement area must be obtained from air traffic control.
