= Airport apron =

Area at an airport used by aircraft for parking, loading, fueling, and maintenance

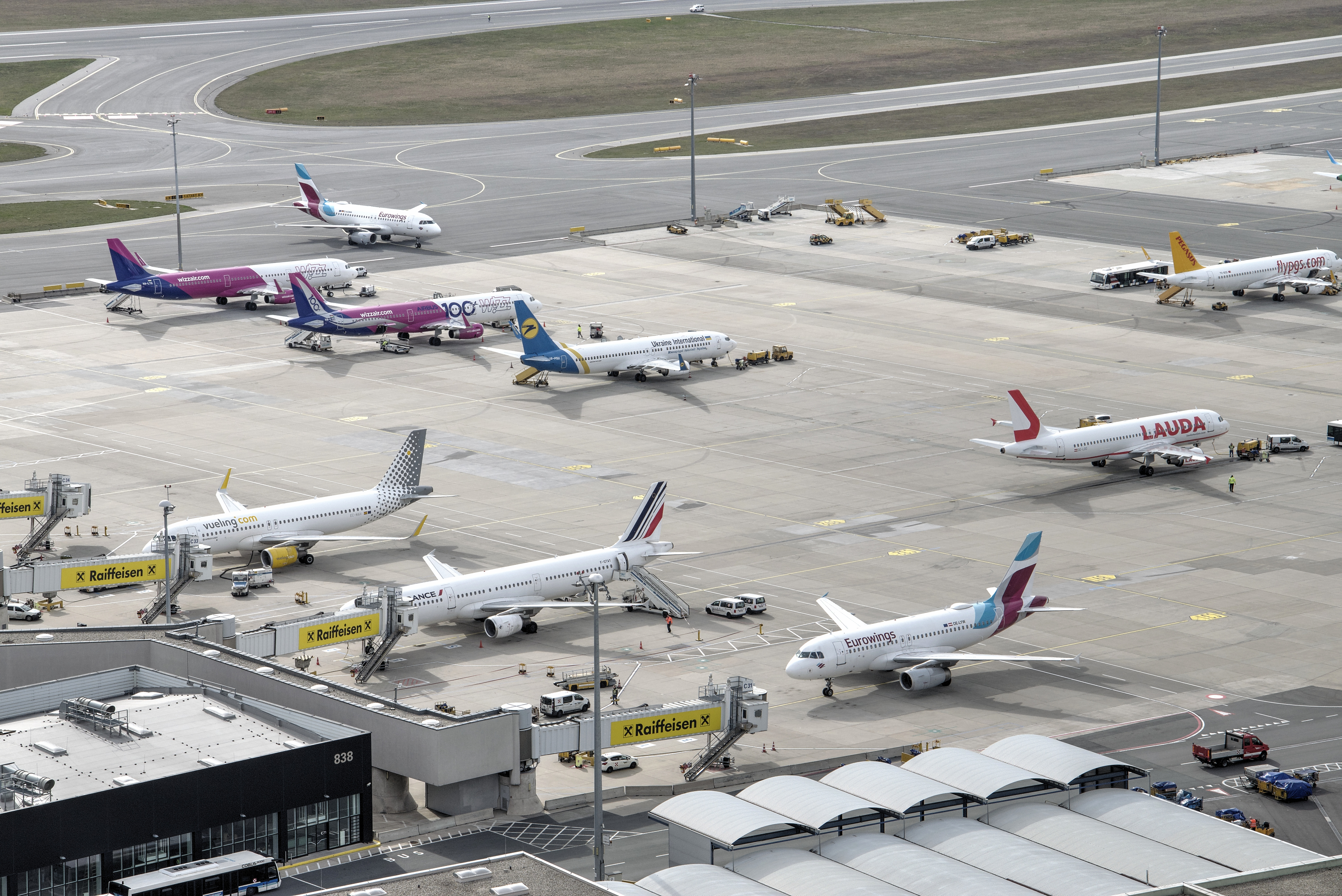
The apron area of Vienna International Airport

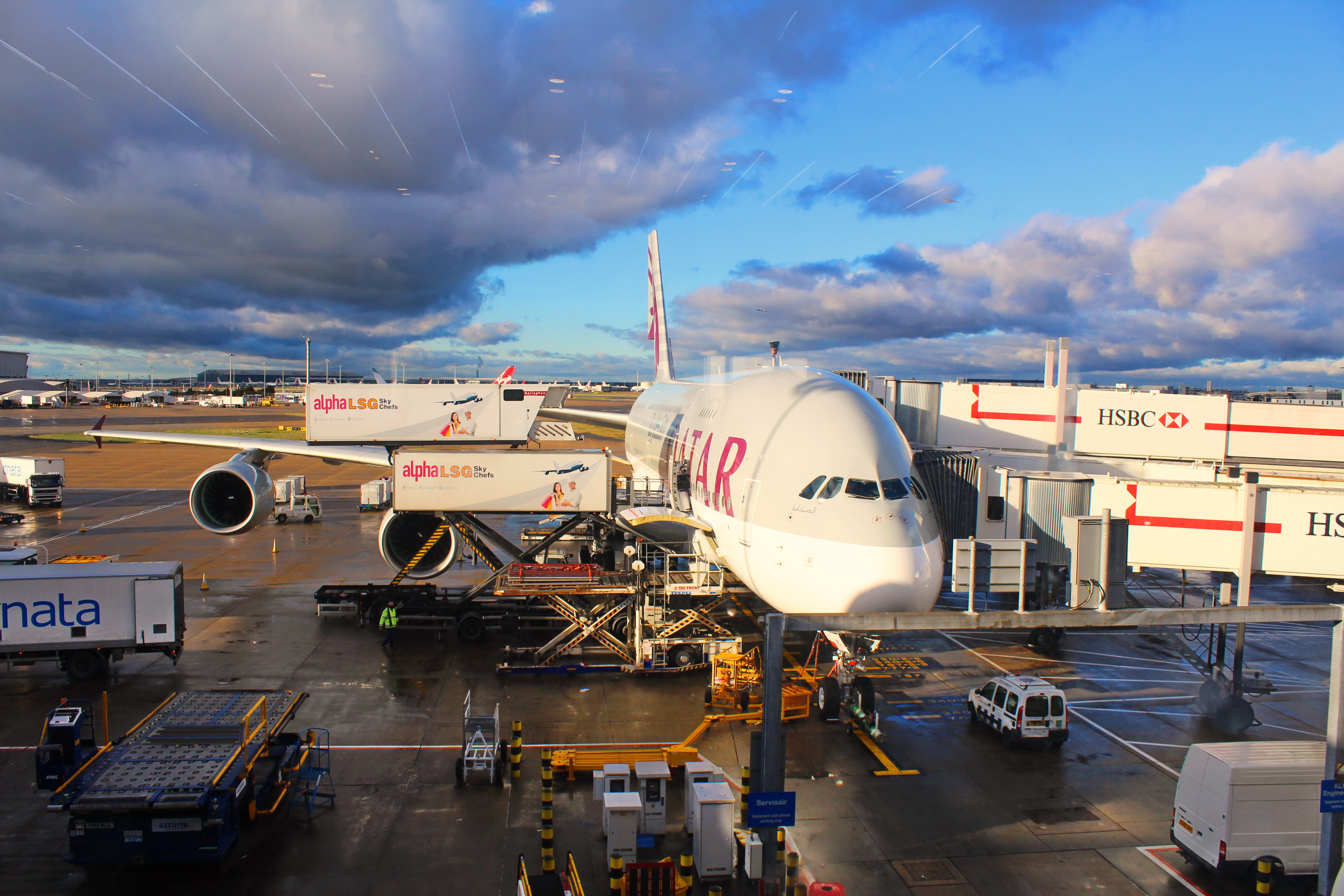
Airbus A380-800 operated by Qatar Airways on apron outside Heathrow Terminal 4 with jet bridges and a wide range of ground handling equipment around such as aircraft container, pallet loader, ULD, jet air starter, belt loader, pushback tug, catering vehicles, and dollies

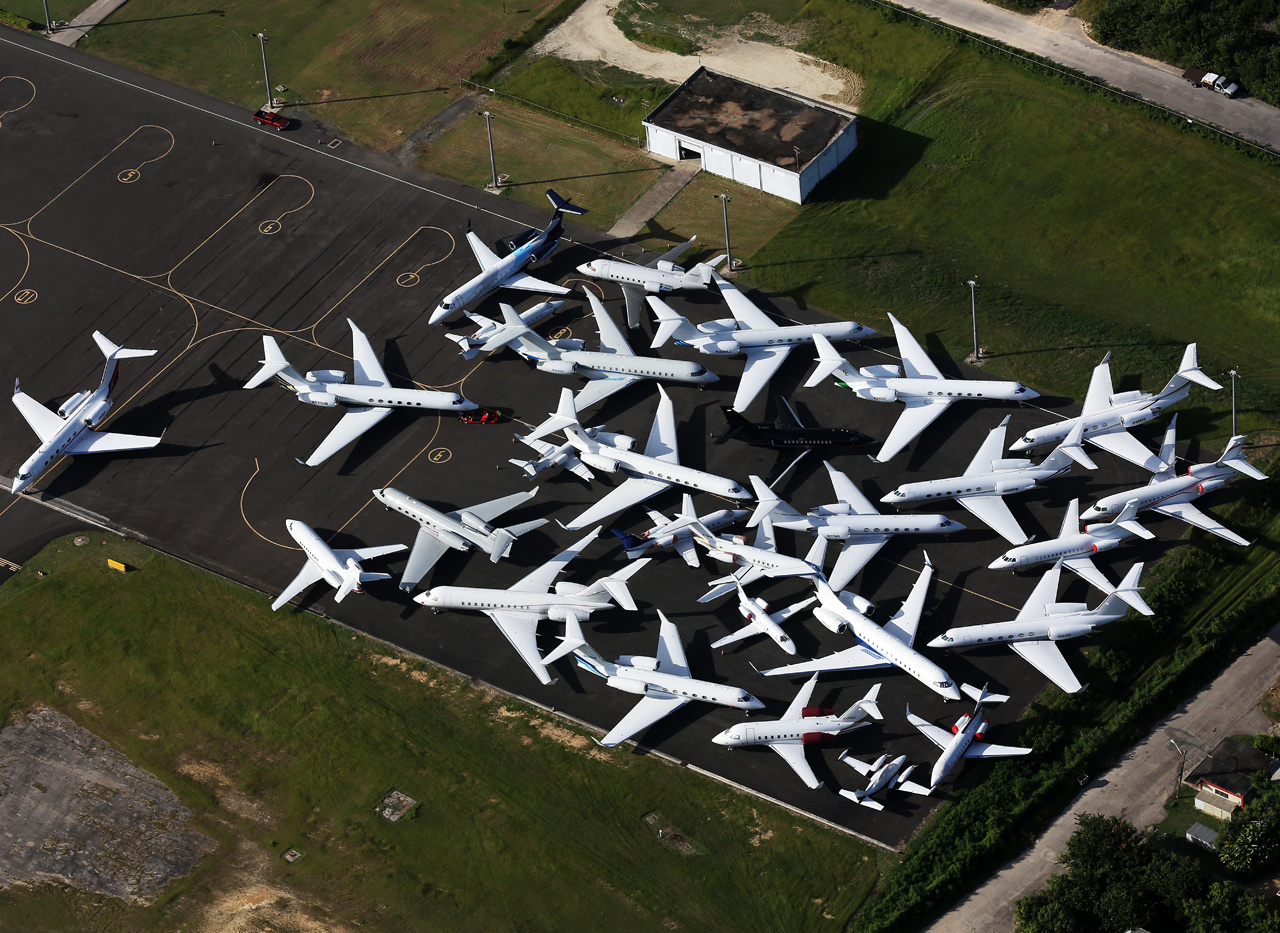
The apron at Anguilla Wallblake Airport clogged with business jets

The airport apron, apron, flight line, or ramp is the area of an airport where aircraft are parked, unloaded or loaded, refueled, boarded, or maintained. Although the use of the apron is covered by regulations, such as lighting on vehicles, it is typically more accessible to users than the runway or taxiway. However, the apron is not usually open to the general public, and a permit may be required to gain access. An apron's designated areas for aircraft parking are called aircraft stands.

By extension, the term apron is also used to identify the air traffic control (ATC) position responsible for coordinating movement on this surface at busier airports. When the aerodrome control tower does not have control over the apron, the use of the apron may be controlled by an apron management service (also known as apron control or apron advisory) to provide coordination between the users. Apron control allocates aircraft parking stands (gates) and communicates this information to tower or ground control and to airline handling agents; it also authorises vehicle movements where they could conflict with taxiing aircraft such as outside of painted road markings. The authority responsible for the aprons is also responsible for relaying to ATC information about the apron conditions such as water, snow, construction or maintenance works on or adjacent to the apron, temporary hazards such as birds or parked vehicles, systems failure etc. Procedures should be established for a coordinated information provision between the aircraft, vehicle, apron control unit and ATC to facilitate the orderly transition of aircraft between the apron management unit and the aerodrome control tower.

The apron is designated by the ICAO as not being part of the maneuvering area but included in the movement area. Aircraft stand taxilanes (providing access to aircraft stands) and apron taxiways (taxi routes across the apron) are located on the apron. All vehicles, aircraft and people using the apron are referred to as apron traffic.

== Other terms ==
=== Flight line ===
The US military typically refers to the apron area as the flight line. The RAAF also uses the term flight line.

=== Tarmac ===
The apron at airports is sometimes informally called the tarmac, even though most of these areas are paved with concrete, not tarmac. Specific materials used include asphalt concrete (which itself is often inexactly called "tarmac", adding to the confusion), porous friction course, and Portland cement concrete.

=== Ramp ===
In the United States, the word ramp is an older term for an area where pre-flight activities were done; an apron was any area for parking and maintenance. Passenger gates are the main feature of a terminal ramp. The word apron is the ICAO and FAA terminology (the word ramp is not), so the word ramp is not used with this meaning outside the US, Canada, the Maldives, and the Philippines. IATA cites ramp as an equivalent term to apron.

For seaplanes, a ramp is used to access the apron/seaplane base from the water.

== See also ==
- Pavement Classification Number (PCN)
- Operational Readiness Platform (ORP)
- Hardstand
- Composite mat – modular ground-protection surfacing sometimes used on aprons and expedient airfields
