= Last order date =

Date before which customers can buy a product

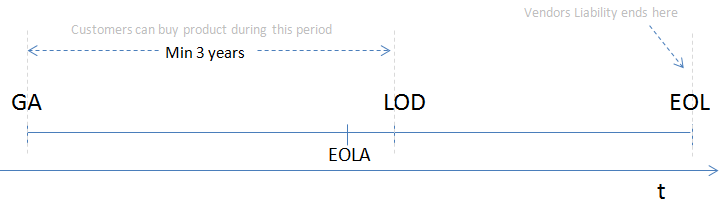
Milestones in a product life cycle: general availability (GA), end of life announcement (EOLA), last order date (LOD), and end-of-life (EOL)

Last order date (LOD) is the date before which customers can buy a product. After this date, its mainstream support has been ended. This is part of the product lifecycle, as specified in JEDEC standards.

== See also ==
- Product change notification
- End-of-life (product)
- End of life announcement
