= ACR-PCR method =

Airport pavement rating system

The Aircraft Classification Rating (ACR) - Pavement Classification Rating (PCR) method is a standardized international airport pavement rating system developed by ICAO in 2022. The method is scheduled to replace the ACN-PCN method as the official ICAO pavement rating system by November 28, 2024. The method uses similar concepts as the ACN-PCN method, however, the ACR-PCR method is based on layered elastic analysis, uses standard subgrade categories for both flexible and rigid pavement, and eliminates the use of alpha factor and layer equivalency factors.

The method relies on the comparison of two numbers:

- The ACR, a number defined as two times the derived single wheel load (expressed in hundreds of kilograms) conveying the relative effect on an airplane of a given weight on a pavement structure for a specified standard subgrade strength;
- The PCR, a number (and series of letters) representing the pavement bearing strength (on the same scale as ACR) of a given pavement section (runway, taxiway, apron) for unrestricted operations.

== Aircraft Classification Rating (ACR) ==
The ACR calculation process is fully described in ICAO Doc 9157 Aerodrome Design Manual – Part 3 "Pavements" (3rd ed.).

The procedure to calculate the ACR is as such:

1. Design a theoretical pavement according to a defined criterion:
  - For flexible pavements, design the pavement for 36,500 passes of the aircraft according to the layered elastic analysis (LEA) design procedure
  - For rigid pavements, design the pavement to resist a standard flexural stress of 2.75 MPa at the bottom of the cement concrete layer according to the LEA design procedure
2. Calculate the single wheel load with a tire pressure of 1.50 MPa that would require the same pavement structural cross-section, this is the Derived Single Wheel Load (DSWL)
3. The ACR is defined as twice the DSWL, expressed in hundreds of kilograms

ACRs are calculated for four standard subgrade strengths, for flexible and rigid pavements, thus leading to 8 different values.

ACRs depend on the landing gear geometry (number of wheels and wheel spacing), the landing gear load (that is dependent upon the aircraft weight and center of gravity) and the tire pressure.

== Pavement Classification Rating (PCR) ==
As opposed to ACR, the ICAO Aerodrome Design Manual does not prescribe a standardized calculation procedure for the PCR; however, ICAO does require an airport authority to use the cumulative damage factor (CDF) concept to determine PCR.

The CDF is the amount of structural fatigue life of a pavement that has been used up. The CDF is expressed as the ratio of applied load repetitions to allowable load repetitions to failure. Damage from multiple aircraft types can be accounted for by summing the CDF for each aircraft in the traffic mix in the application of Miner's rule for the prediction of fatigue life in structures.

ICAO defines a standardized reporting format for the PCR that comprises the PCR numerical value and a series of 4 letters.

Pavement Classification Number - Code letters definitions
Pavement type
Rigid pavement	R
Flexible pavement	F
Subgrade strength category
High strength: characterized by k = 200 MN/m^3 and representing all k values above 150 MN/m^3	A
Medium strength: characterized by k = 120 MN/m^3 and representing a range in k of 100 to 150 MN/m^3	B
Low strength: characterized by k = 80 MN/m^3 and representing a range in k of 60 to 100 MN/m^3	C
Ultralow strength: characterized by k = 50 MN/m^3 and representing all k values below 60 MN/m^3	D
Maximum allowable tire pressure
Unlimited: no pressure limit	W
High: limited to 1.75 MPa	X
Medium: limited to 1.25 MPa	Y
Low: limited to 0.50 MPa	Z
Evaluation method	
Technical evaluation	T
Using aircraft experience	U

The ICAO Aerodrome Design Manual contains example calculations for a technical evaluation of PCR with the French pavement design procedure using French material specifications and with the FAA pavement design procedure using standard material specifications found in the United States.
