= Product change notification =

A product change notification (PCN) is a document issued by a manufacturer to inform customers about a change to a mass-produced product or its manufacturing process. In the semi-conductor industry, the JEDEC standard J-STD-046 describes the requirements for product change notifications and examples of types of changes that should be notified.

== See also ==
- End-of-life (product)
- Last order date
