= ACN-PCN method =

Airport pavement rating system

The Aircraft Classification Number (ACN) – Pavement Classification Number (PCN) method is a standardized international airport pavement rating system promulgated by the ICAO in 1981. The method has been the official ICAO pavement rating system for pavements intended for aircraft of apron (ramp) mass greater than 5700 kg from 1981 to 2020. The method is scheduled to be replaced by the ACR-PCR method by November 28, 2024.

For the safe and efficient use of pavements, the method has been designed to:

1. enable aircraft operators to determine the permissible operating weights for their aircraft;
2. assist aircraft manufacturers to ensure compatibility between airfield pavements and the aircraft under development;
3. permit airport authorities to report on the aircraft they can accept and allow them to use any evaluation procedure of their choice to ascertain the loading the pavements can accept.

The method relies on the plain comparison of two numbers:

- The ACN, a number that expresses the relative effect on an airplane of a given weight on a pavement structure for a specified standard subgrade strength;
- The PCN, a number (and series of letters) representing the pavement bearing strength (on the same scale as ACN) of a given pavement section (runway, taxiway, apron) for unrestricted operations.

== Aircraft Classification Number (ACN) ==
The ACN calculation process is fully described in ICAO Doc 9157 Aerodrome Design Manual – Part 3 "Pavements" (2nd ed.).

The procedure to calculate the ACN is as such:

1. Design a theoretical pavement according to a defined criterion:
  - For flexible pavements, design the pavement for 10,000 load applications of the aircraft according to the CBR design procedure combined with Boussinesq's solution for deflection in the elastic half-space
  - For rigid pavements, design the pavement to reach a standard flexural stress of 2.75 MPa at the bottom of the cement concrete layer according to Westergaard theory
2. Calculate the single wheel load, inflated at 1.25 MPa, that would require the same pavement – this is the Derived Single Wheel Load (DSWL)
3. The ACN is defined as twice the DSWL, expressed in thousands of kilograms

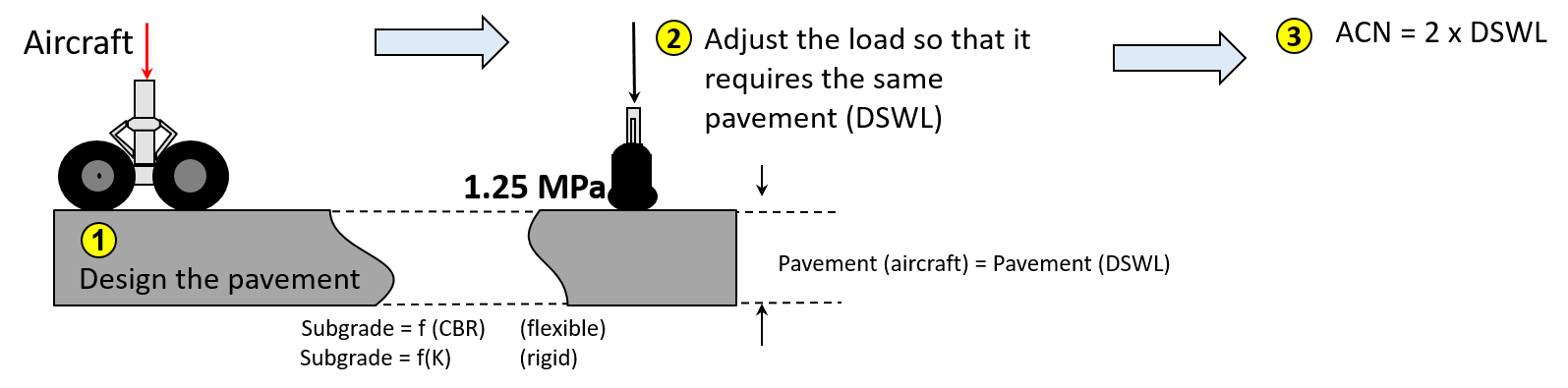
Procedure for the calculation of ACN

The ACN are calculated for four standard subgrade strengths, for flexible and rigid pavements, thus leading to 8 different values.

ACNs depend on the landing gear geometry (number of wheels and wheel spacing), the landing gear load (that is dependent upon the aircraft weight and center of gravity) and the tire pressure.

Normally, the aftmost center of gravity for the Maximum Ramp Weight (MRW) lead to the critical ACN.

Aircraft manufacturers publish the ACNs of their aircraft in their respective Aircraft Characteristics manuals.

The ICAO Aerodrome Design Manual contains the source code of computer programs for the calculation of ACNs. The FAA also developed COMFAA, a software enabling the calculation of ACNs for different aircraft depending on the input parameters.

== Pavement Classification Number (PCN) ==
Contrary to the ACN, the ICAO does not prescribe a standardized calculation procedure for the PCN. Different PCN calculation procedures may therefore be found around the world.

However, the ICAO defines a standardized reporting format for the PCN that comprises the PCN numerical value and a series of 4 letters.

PCN may also be known as Load Classification Number or LCN.

Pavement Classification Number - Code letters definitions
Pavement type
Rigid pavement	R
Flexible pavement	F
Subgrade strength category
High strength: characterized by K = 150 MN/m^3 and representing all K values above 120 MN/m^3 for rigid pavements, and by CBR = 15 and representing all CBR values above 13 for flexible pavements.	A
Medium strength: characterized by K = 80 MN/m^3 and representing a range in K of 60 to 120 MN/m^3 for rigid pavements, and by CBR = 10 and representing a range in CBR of 8 to 13 for flexible pavements	B
Low strength: characterized by K = 40 MN/m^3 and representing a range in K of 25 to 60 MN/m^3 for rigid pavements, and by CBR = 6 and representing a range in CBR of 4 to 8 for flexible pavements	C
Ultralow strength: characterized by K = 20 MN/m^3 and representing all K values below 25 MN/m^3 for rigid pavements, and by CBR = 3 and representing all CBR values below 4 for flexible pavements	D
Maximum allowable tire pressure
Unlimited: no pressure limit	W
High: limited to 1.75 MPa	X
Medium: limited to 1.25 MPa	Y
Low: limited to 0.50 MPa	Z
Evaluation method	
Technical evaluation	T
Using aircraft experience	U

PCNs depend on both the pavement structure and the aircraft traffic operated on the pavement.

The PCNs are determined by airports for their runways, taxiways and aprons and published in the Aeronautical Information Publication (AIP).

== Application by aerodrome authorities and aircraft operators ==
An aircraft having an ACN (at a given weight) equal to or less than the PCN can operate without restriction on the pavement, provided that its tire pressure does not exceed the PCN limitation.

If the ACN exceeds the PCN, some restrictions (for example on weight of frequency of operation) may apply depending on the national or local regulations for overload operations.

With the exception of massive overloading, pavements in their structural behaviour are not subject to particular limiting load above which they suddenly or catastrophically fail.

As a result, minor or medium overload operations may be allowed by the airport authority depending on the corresponding loss in pavement life expectancy.

== Evolutions and limitations ==
The ACN-PCN method underwent 2 major changes since its introduction in 1981:

- In 2007, the ICAO adopted a new set of alpha-factors for the calculation of ACNs on flexible pavements based on findings from full-scale pavement tests. This led to a reduction of the flexible ACNs for all landing gears with four wheels or more.
- In 2013, the ICAO adopted new limits for the tire pressure categories, again based on findings from full-scale pavement tests.

Despite these changes, the ACN-PCN method gradually became inconsistent with recent pavement design methods, mostly based on Linear Elastic Analysis (LEA) or Finite Element Method (FEM). The method is also failing to consider accurately the effect of modern landing gear configurations (with multi-wheels arrangements) and the improved characteristics of new-generation pavement materials.

As a result, the ICAO triggered the development of a new pavement rating method aimed at overcoming these deficiencies. This new system, the ACR-PCR method, became effective in July 2020.

== Aircraft ACN list ==
Aircraft Classification Numbers (ACNs)
Aircraft	Weight Maximum (kN)	Tire Pressure (MPa)	Flexible pavement sub-grades CBR%				Rigid pavement sub-grades k (MPa/m^{3})			
Aircraft	Weight Maximum (kN)	Tire Pressure (MPa)	High	Medium	Low	Very low	High	Medium	Low	Ultra low
Aircraft	Weight Maximum (kN)	Tire Pressure (MPa)	A	B	C	D	A	B	C	D
Airbus A330-200 (Configuration 1)	2,137	1.34	57	62	72	98	48	56	66	78
Airbus A330-200 (Configuration 2)	2,264	1.42	62	67	78	106	53	61	73	85
Airbus A330-300 (Configuration 1)	2,088	1.31	55	60	70	94	46	54	64	75
Airbus A330-300 (Configuration 2)	2,137	1.33	57	61	71	96	47	55	65	77
Airbus A330-300 (Configuration 3)	2,264	1.42	62	68	79	107	54	62	74	86
Airbus A380-800 (6 Wheel Main Gear)	5,514	1.47	56	62	75	106	55	67	88	110
Airbus A380-800 (4 Wheel Wing Gear)	5,514	1.47	62	68	80	108	55	64	76	88
Boeing 737-800	777	1.47	44	46	51	56	51	53	55	57
Boeing 737-900	777	1.47	44	46	51	56	51	53	55	57
Boeing 737-BBJ	763	1.47	43	45	50	55	50	52	54	56
Boeing 747-400, 400F, 400M	3,905	1.38	53	59	73	94	53	62	74	85
Boeing 747-400D (Domestic)	2,729	1.04	36	39	47	65	30	36	43	51
Boeing 747-400ER	4,061	1.58	57	63	78	100	59	69	81	92
Boeing 747SP	3,127	1.26	45	50	61	81	40	48	58	67
Boeing 777-300	2,945	1.48	53	59	72	100	54	68	88	108
Boeing 777-300ER	3,345	1.52	64	71	89	120	66	85	109	131
Boeing 787-9	2,240	1.57	60	66	81	106	61	71	84	96
BAC-111 Series 400	390	0.97	23	24	27	29	25	27	28	29
BAC-111 Series 475	440	0.57	23	28	29	32	26	28	29	31
BAC-111 Series 500	467	1.1	29	31	33	35	33	34	35	36
BAe-146-100	376	0.84	18	20	23	26	20	22	24	25
BAe-146-200	416	0.97	22	23	26	29	24	26	27	29
BAe-146-300	436	1.1	24	25	28	31	27	28	30	31
BAe ATP	232	0.85	12	13	14	16	13	14	15	16
Beech 1900C, 1900D	76	0.67	3	4	4	5	4	4	5	5
Beech Starship 2000	65	0.54	2	3	4	4	3	4	4	4
Beech Jet 400, 400A	73	0.86	6	7	7	7	6	6	6	6
Beech King Air 100, 200 Series	56	0.73	2	3	3	4	3	3	3	4
Beech King Air 300, 300C, 350, 350C	67	0.73	3	3	4	4	4	4	4	4
Bombardier 415 (Canadair CL-215, 415)	196	0.53	12	14	17	17	14	14	15	15
Bombardier BD-700, Global Express, XRS	437	1.15	26	28	31	32	30	31	32	33
Bombardier Challenger 300	168	1.21	9	9	11	12	11	11	12	12
Bombardier Challenger 800	237	1.12	13	14	16	17	16	16	17	18
Bombardier Challenger CL 600, 601, 604	215	1.21	12	13	15	16	15	15	16	16
Bombardier CRJ100, CRJ200, CRJ440	237	1.12	13	14	16	17	16	16	17	18
Bombardier CRJ700 Series	335	1.06	18	18	21	24	20	21	22	23
Bombardier CRJ900 Series	377	1.06	21	21	24	27	23	24	26	27
Bombardier Dash 8 Q100, Q200 Series	162	0.9	8	8	9	11	9	9	10	10
Bombardier Dash 8 Q300 Series	192	0.67	8	9	11	13	10	11	11	12
Bombardier Dash 8 Q400	287	0.67	14	16	18	20	16	17	18	19
Bombardier Global	391	1.15	23	24	27	29	26	27	28	29
C-123K Provider (Fairchild/Republic)	267	0.69	20	22	24	25	21	21	22	22
C-141B Starlifter (Lockheed)	1,553	1.31	52	60	73	88	51	61	70	78
C-17A (Globemaster III)	2,736	0.95	46	51	61	80	55	51	61	76
C-5 Galaxy (Lockheed)	3,723	0.77	31	33	40	51	28	31	37	45
Cessna 501 (Citation I – Eagle)	56	0.69	4	5	5	5	4	5	5	5
Cessna 550 (Citation II)	64	0.69	5	5	6	6	5	5	5	5
Cessna 550 (Citation Bravo)	67	0.69	5	6	6	6	5	5	6	6
Cessna 560 (Citation V, Ultra, Encore)	75	0.69	6	6	7	7	6	6	6	6
Cessna 560 XL (Citation Excel)	90	1.48	9	9	9	9	9	9	9	9
Cessna 650 (Citation III, VI)	99	1.02	6	6	7	7	7	7	7	7
Cessna 650 (Citation VII)	104	1.16	6	7	7	8	7	8	8	8
Cessna 750 (Citation X)	160	1.16	10	11	12	12	12	12	13	13
Convair 240	190	0.64	7	9	10	12	9	10	10	11
Convair 340, 440, 540	222	0.47	7	9	11	14	9	10	11	12
Convair 580	259	0.59	10	12	14	17	12	13	14	15
Convair 5800	280	0.59	11	13	15	19	13	14	16	17
Convair 600	210	0.73	9	10	11	14	10	11	12	13
Convair 640	245	0.52	8	11	12	15	10	12	13	14
Convair 880	860	1.03	27	31	36	44	26	31	36	40
Convair 990	1,135	1.28	40	46	53	64	40	47	54	60
Dassault Falcon	164	1.36	9	10	11	12	11	12	12	13
Dassault Falcon 2000EX	189	1.51	11	12	13	14	14	14	15	15
Dassault Falcon 10	84	0.93	5	5	6	6	6	6	6	6
Dassault Falcon 20	128	0.92	8	9	9	10	10	10	10	10
Dassault Falcon 50	173	0.93	9	10	12	13	11	12	12	13
Dassault Falcon 900	202	1.3	11	12	14	15	14	14	15	15
Douglas DC-3	147	0.31	5	7	10	12	8	8	9	9
Douglas DC-4	335	0.53	12	15	17	21	14	16	17	19
Douglas DC-6, 6B	480	0.73	20	23	25	30	22	24	26	27
Douglas DC-7 (All Models)	640	0.89	34	36	42	46	37	40	42	44
Douglas DC-8-10, 20 Series	1,226	1.01	36	41	49	62	32	39	46	53
Douglas DC-8-43, 55, 61, 71	1,470	1.3	47	54	64	79	45	54	63	71
Douglas DC-8-61F, 63F	1,557	1.32	51	59	69	85	50	59	68	76
Douglas DC-8-62, 62F, 63, 72, 73	1,593	1.35	52	59	70	87	50	59	69	77
DHC-4 Caribou	130	0.28	2	3	5	7	4	4	5	6
DHC-5 Buffalo	187	0.41	6	8	10	12	8	9	10	11
DHC-6 Twin Otter Series 300	56	0.26	2	2	3	5	3	3	3	4
DHC-7 Dash 7	209	0.74	10	12	13	15	12	13	14	14
DHS-2 Conair Firecat	116	0.62	8	10	10	11	9	9	9	10
Dornier 228 Series	63	0.9	5	6	6	6	6	6	6	6
Dornier 328 Jet	155	1.13	8	8	10	11	10	10	10	11
Dornier 328-110 (Turboprop)	138	0.8	7	7	8	10	8	8	9	9
Dornier SA227 (Metro, Merlin, Expediter)	74	0.73	3	4	4	5	4	5	5	5
Douglas A-26 Invader	120	0.48	7	8	10	11	8	8	9	9
Douglas B-26 Invader	156	0.48	9	11	13	14	10	11	11	12
Embraer 170, 175	368	1.04	20	21	24	26	22	24	25	26
Embraer E-190	481	1.1	28	30	33	35	31	33	35	36
Embraer E-195	52.29	1.04	25.3	26.3	29.2	34.1	27.4	29.4	31.4	33
Embraer EMB-110 (Bandeirante)	59	0.62	4	5	5	5	5	5	5	5
Embraer EMB-120 (Brasilia) Series	119	0.76	5	6	7	8	7	7	7	8
Embraer ERJ-145 Series	237	0.9	14	15	16	17	16	16	17	18
Fokker 100	452	0.94	25	27	31	33	28	30	31	33
Fokker 50	205	0.59	9	11	13	14	11	12	13	13
Fokker 60	226	0.62	10	13	14	16	13	14	14	15
Fokker 70	410	0.81	21	24	27	30	24	26	27	29
Fokker F27 Friendship	205	0.57	9	11	13	14	11	12	13	13
Fokker F28 Fellowship	325	0.53	14	17	20	23	16	18	20	21
Gulfstream G100 (IAI-1125-Astra SPX)	111	0.86	6	6	7	8	7	7	7	8
Gulfstream G159	156	0.83	8	8	10	11	9	10	10	11
Gulfstream G200 (IAI-1126-Galaxy)	159	0.86	9	10	11	12	10	11	11	12
Gulfstream II	294	1.04	17	18	20	22	20	21	21	22
Gulfstream III	312	1.21	19	20	22	23	22	23	23	24
Gulfstream IV	334	1.21	20	22	24	25	24	25	25	26
Gulfstream V	405	1.37	26	28	30	31	31	32	32	33
Hawker 1000 (BAe 1000A)	138	0.83	8	8	9	10	9	9	10	10
Hawker 400XP (Beech Jet 400A)	73	0.86	6	7	7	7	6	6	6	6
Hawker 800, 800XP (HS-125-800, 800XP)	125	0.83	7	7	8	9	8	8	9	9
Hercules C-130, 082, 182, 282, 382	778	0.67	29	34	37	43	33	36	39	42
Hercules L-100 (Commercial)	693	0.74	27	30	33	38	30	33	35	38
HS/BAe 125 (All Series to 600)	112	0.83	6	6	7	8	7	7	8	8
HS/BAe 700	114	0.88	6	7	7	8	7	8	8	8
HS/BAe 748	227	0.51	9	11	14	16	11	12	13	14
Ilyushin Il-18	625	0.8	16	17	21	29	13	16	20	23
Ilyushin Il-62, 62M	1,648	1.65	52	58	68	83	51	59	68	77
Ilyushin Il-76T	1,677	0.64	24	27	34	45	29	33	30	34
Ilyushin Il-76TD	1,775	0.66	27	30	37	49	32	35	32	37
Ilyushin Il-86	2,054	0.88	34	36	43	61	26	31	38	46
Jetstream 31, 32 (BAe)	69	0.39	3	4	5	6	4	5	5	5
Jetstream 41 (BAe)	107	0.83	5	5	6	7	6	6	7	7
KC-10 (McDonnell Douglas)	2,593	1.22	59	65	79	107	50	59	72	84
KC-135 Stratotanker (Boeing)	1,342	1.38	38	41	49	64	35	40	48	55
Lockheed L-1011-1 Tristar	1,913	1.35	52	56	66	90	45	52	62	72
Lockheed L-1011-100, 200 Tristar	2,073	1.35	57	63	75	101	49	58	69	81
Lockheed L-1011-250 Tristar	2,269	1.35	64	71	86	114	55	66	79	91
Lockheed L-1011-500 Tristar	2,295	1.35	65	72	87	116	56	67	80	93
Learjet 24F (Bombardier)	62	0.79	3	3	4	4	4	4	4	4
Learjet 25D, 25F (Bombardier)	69	0.79	3	4	4	5	4	5	5	5
Learjet 25G (Bombardier)	75	0.79	4	4	5	5	5	5	5	5
Learjet 28, 29 (Long-horn) (Bombardier)	69	0.79	3	4	4	5	4	5	5	5
Learjet 31A, 35A, 36A (Bombardier)	83	0.79	4	5	5	6	5	5	6	6
Learjet 40, 45, 45XR (Bombardier)	98	0.79	5	6	7	7	6	7	7	7
Learjet 55B, 55C (Bombardier)	97	1.24	6	6	7	7	7	7	7	7
Learjet 60 (Bombardier)	106	1.48	6	7	7	8	8	8	8	8
Lockheed 188 Electra	503	0.95	27	29	33	36	30	32	34	36
McDonnell Douglas CF-18 Hornet	249	1.38	21	20	20	20	21	21	21	21
McDonnell Douglas DC-9-10, 15	404	0.93	22	23	26	29	24	26	27	28
McDonnell Douglas DC-9-21	445	1.02	25	26	30	32	28	29	31	32
McDonnell Douglas DC-9-30, 32	485	1.05	27	29	33	35	30	32	34	35
McDonnell Douglas DC-9-41, 50, 51	543	1.17	31	33	37	40	35	37	39	40
McDonnell Douglas DC-10-10, 10CF, 15	2,037	1.34	57	62	74	101	49	58	69	80
McDonnell Douglas DC-10-20, 20CF, 30CF, 40CF	2,485	1.14	60	67	81	110	49	59	72	85
McDonnell Douglas DC-10-30, 30ER, 40	2,593	1.22	59	65	79	107	50	59	72	84
McDonnell Douglas MD-11	2,805	1.38	67	74	90	119	58	69	83	96
McDonnell Douglas MD-81	628	1.14	36	38	43	46	41	43	45	46
McDonnell Douglas MD-82	670	1.14	39	41	46	49	43	46	48	50
McDonnell Douglas MD-83	716	1.14	42	45	50	53	47	50	52	54
McDonnell Douglas MD-87	628	1.14	36	38	43	46	41	43	45	46
McDonnell Douglas MD-88	670	1.14	39	41	46	50	44	46	48	50
McDonnell Douglas MD-90-30	699	1.14	41	43	48	52	46	48	50	52
McDonnell Douglas MD-90-30ER	739	1.14	44	47	52	55	49	51	54	56
McDonnell Douglas MD-90-50, 55	772	1.14	46	50	54	57	52	54	57	58
P-3A/B/C Orion	623	1.31	38	41	44	47	44	46	48	49
Saab 2000	226	0.69	11	13	14	16	13	14	15	15
Saab 340 A, B	131	0.82	6	7	8	9	7	8	8	9
Sepecat Jaguar (Configuration 1)	154	0.58	7	9	10	11	9	10	10	11
Sepecat Jaguar (Configuration 2)	108	0.58	4	6	6	7	6	6	7	7
Shorts 330	102	0.55	6	8	9	9	7	8	8	8
Shorts 360	121	0.54	7	9	10	11	9	9	9	9
Shorts Sherpa	114	0.54	7	8	10	10	8	8	9	9
Shorts Skyvan	67	0.28	2	3	4	6	4	4	4	4
Sukhoi Superjet 100	46	1.11	24.8	24.8	28	31.5	27	28.6	30.1	31.3
Swearingen SJ30-2	60	1.07	3	3	3	4	4	4	4	4
Transall C-160	500	0.38	8	10	13	18	10	10	10	13
Tupolev Tu-134	463	0.59	10	12	15	20	9	11	14	16
Tupolev Tu-154	961	0.93	19	22	28	37	18	24	30	36
Tupolev Tu-204, 214, 224, 234	1,096	1.38	31	33	40	53	29	34	40	46
Vickers VC10 Series	1,590	1.01	48	54	66	83	41	50	60	69
