= List of national days of mourning (2020–present) =

This is a list of national days of mourning since 2020. It does not include annual remembrance events. A gray row indicates that the mourning period was unofficial or specific to a selected region.

== 2020 ==
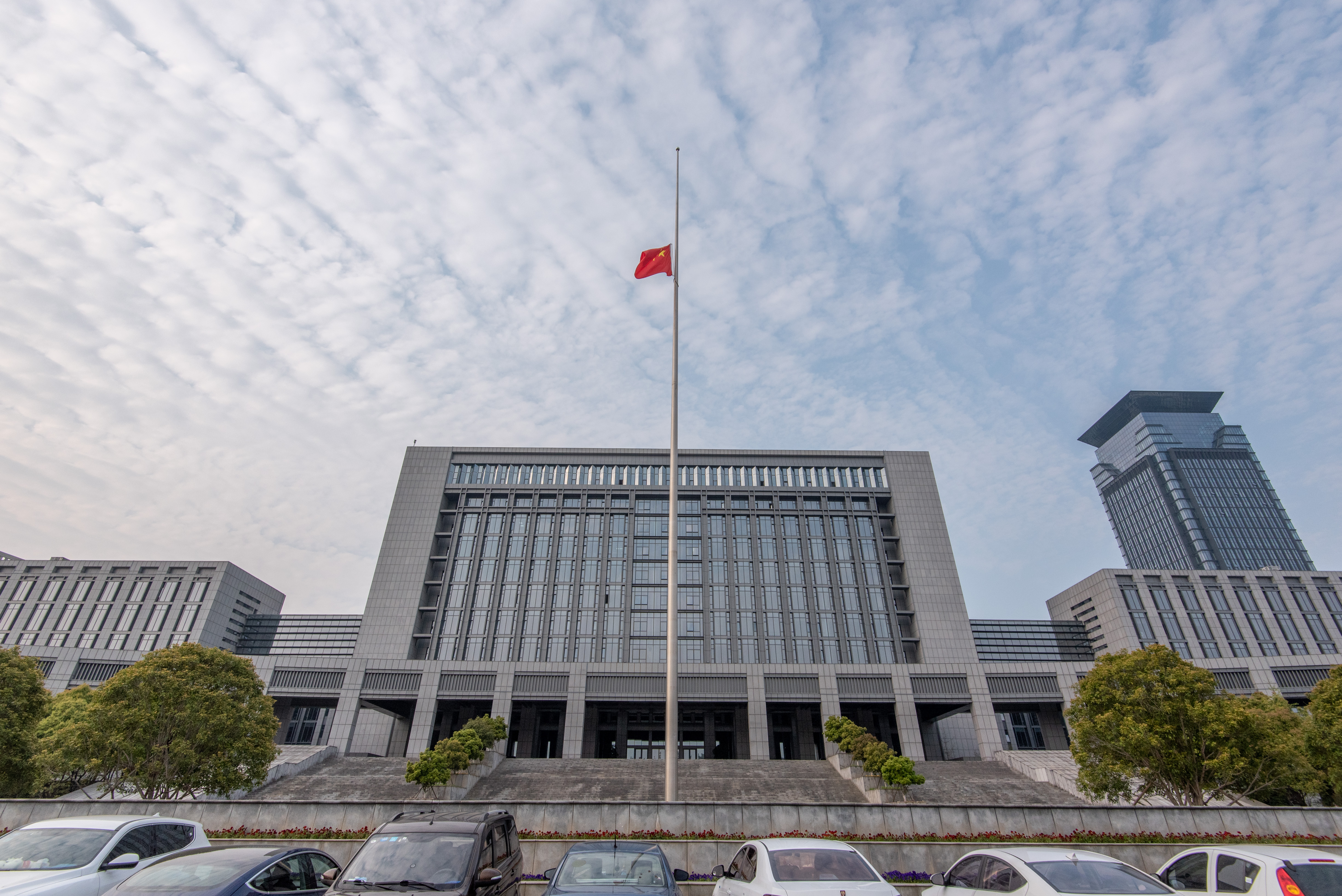
Chinese flag at half-mast in front of Zhenhai Government Hall during the COVID-19 pandemic in April 2020

Country	Days	Calendar days	Reason	Notes
Iran	3	4-6 January	Assassination of Qasem Soleimani, commander of IRGC's Quds Force, in a U.S. airstrike in Baghdad, Iraq	A three-day national mourning was announced on 4 to 6 January.
Iraq	3	4-6 January	Assassination of Qasem Soleimani, commander of IRGC's Quds Force, in a U.S. airstrike in Baghdad, Iraq	
Libya	3	5-7 January	Victims of an airstrike in eastern Libya	
Chad	1	7 January	Death of former prime minister Djimrangar Dadnadji	
Malta	1	9 January	Death of Prospero Grech	
Iran	1	9 January	Victims of the stampede at Kerman crowd incident and the crash of Ukraine International Airlines Flight 752	9 January was declared a day of national mourning.
Ukraine	1	9 January	Victims of the crash of Ukraine International Airlines Flight 752	
Oman	3	12-14 January	Death of Oman's Sultan Qaboos bin Said Al Said	Work for both public and private sectors were suspended for three days. Entertainment and cultural events canceled.
Kuwait	3	11-13 January	Death of Oman's Sultan Qaboos bin Said Al Said	11–13 January were public sector holidays.
Saudi Arabia	3	11-13 January	Death of Oman's Sultan Qaboos bin Said Al Said	However, flags weren't at half-mast
Qatar	3	11-13 January	Death of Oman's Sultan Qaboos bin Said Al Said	
United Arab Emirates	3	11-13 January	Death of Oman's Sultan Qaboos bin Said Al Said	
Bahrain	3	11-13 January	Death of Oman's Sultan Qaboos bin Said Al Said	
Lebanon	3	11-13 January	Death of Oman's Sultan Qaboos bin Said Al Said	
Egypt	3	11-13 January	Death of Oman's Sultan Qaboos bin Said Al Said	
India	1	13 January	Death of Oman's Sultan Qaboos bin Said Al Said	Entertainment events were canceled on 13 January.
Bangladesh	1	13 January	Death of Oman's Sultan Qaboos bin Said Al Said	
Niger	3	13-15 January	Soldiers killed in the Battle of Chinagodrar	
Burkina Faso	2	22-23 January	Victims of 2020 Burkina Faso attacks	
Kosovo	1	30 January	Death of Sami Thaqi	
Czech Republic	1	3 February	Death of Chairman of the Senate of the Czech Republic Jaroslav Kubera	Flags lowered to half-mast.
Kenya	9	4-12 February	Death of the former president of Kenya Daniel arap Moi	
Kosovo	1	9 February	Death of Nexhmije Pagarusha	
Mozambique	7	13-19 February	Death of Marcelino dos Santos	
Mozambique	2	23-24 February	Death of former Prime Minister Mario Machungo	
Egypt	3	26-28 February	Death of former president of Egypt Hosni Mubarak	
United Arab Emirates	1	25 February	Death of former president of Egypt Hosni Mubarak	
Nicaragua	3	1-3 March	Death of Ernesto Cardenal	
Liberia	3	3-5 March	Death of Liberian Ambassador to Senegal Mary-Ann Fossung	
Peru	2	6-7 March	Death of former Prime Minister and former UN Secretary General Javier Pérez de Cuéllar	
Burkina Faso	3	9-11 March	Victims of the 2020 Dinguila and Barga attacks	
Guinea	1	9 March	Footballers killed in a bus crash	
Chad	3	26-28 March	Victims of 2020 Boko Haram attack	
Mexico	33	13 August-11 September and 31 October-2 November	Victims of the COVID-19 pandemic	In the evening edition of the Official Gazette of the Federation (DOF) a decree was published in which it is established that, as a sign of mourning, the National Flag would be hoisted at half mast, during the period from 13 August to 11 September 2020. A second period of mourning, for 3 days, were declared starting from 31 October – 2 November 2020.
Ecuador	15	16-30 April	Victims of the COVID-19 pandemic	
Spain	10	27 May-5 June	Victims of the COVID-19 pandemic	National mourning from 27 May to 5 June. This is the longest period of national mourning in Spain since its transition to democracy.
Brazil	7	9-11 May and 8-11 August	Victims of the COVID-19 pandemic	First 3 days decreed in May, the following 4 in August
South Africa	5	25-29 November	Victims of the COVID-19 pandemic	National mourning on 25–29 November. Also decreed for gender-based and femicide victims.
Andorra	3	1-3 June	Victims of the COVID-19 pandemic	
Italy	1	31 March	Victims of the COVID-19 pandemic	31 March was national day of mourning.
China	1	4 April	Victims of the COVID-19 pandemic	4 April was national day of mourning.
Hong Kong	1	4 April	Victims of the COVID-19 pandemic	4 April was national day of mourning
Macao	1	4 April	Victims of the COVID-19 pandemic	
Holy See	1	31 March	Victims of the COVID-19 pandemic	31 March was national day of mourning, Vatican mourns for Coronavirus deaths from Italy and for the world
Kazakhstan	1	13 July	Victims of the COVID-19 pandemic	13 July was national day of mourning.
Kyrgyzstan	1	30 July	Victims of the COVID-19 pandemic	30 July was national day of mourning.
Portugal	1	2 November	Victims of the COVID-19 pandemic	2 November day of national mourning, to coincide with All Souls Day.
Sahrawi Arab Democratic Republic	7	1-7 April	Death of Mhammad Jadad	
Somalia	3	2-4 April	Death of former Prime Minister Nur Hassan Hussein	
Comoros	3	9-11 April	Death of Grand Mufti of Comoros	
South Sudan	3	23-25 April	Death of Mansour Khalid	
South Africa	3	1-3 May	Death of Denis Goldberg	
Laos	5	12-16 May	Death of former Prime Minister Sisavath Keobounphanh	
Uruguay	3	1-3 June	Killing of 3 Uruguayan young marines	
Jamaica	7	10-16 June	Death of Shahine Robinson	
Kenya	14	13-26 June	Death of President of Burundi Pierre Nkurunziza	
Rwanda	14	13-26 June	Death of President of Burundi Pierre Nkurunziza	Flags at half mast.
Uganda	14	13-26 June	Death of President of Burundi Pierre Nkurunziza	Flags at half mast.
Burundi	7	9-15 June	Death of President of Burundi Pierre Nkurunziza	In the section on other matters, the government announced the suspension of all non-religious music in public places during the presidential mourning period. The seven-day national mourning was announced on 9 June, the day after the president's death. A government statement said music in bars, nightclubs and karaoke sessions had been suspended. It was announced that only weddings and funerals were allowed. On 26 June, the president's funeral was declared a day off. On that day, offices, schools and companies were closed.
Tanzania	3	10-12 June	Death of President of Burundi Pierre Nkurunziza	
Cuba	1	13 June	Death of President of Burundi Pierre Nkurunziza	
Mali	3	17-19 June	Victims of a terrorist attacks in Diabaly	
Namibia	3	2-4 July	Death of Martin Lazarus Shipanga	
United States Virgin Islands	1	9 July	Murder of George Floyd	
Equatorial Guinea	3	11-13 July	Death of First president of the Chamber of Deputies Santiago Nsobeya	National mourning on 11–13 July. Flags at half mast.
Ivory Coast	8	11-18 July	Death of Prime Minister Amadou Gon Coulibaly	
Tanzania	7	24-30 July	Death of former Tanzanian President Benjamin Mkapa	
Kenya	3	27-29 July	Death of former Tanzanian President Benjamin Mkapa	
Uganda	3	25-27 July	Death of former Tanzanian President Benjamin Mkapa	
Burundi	3	27-29 July	Death of former Tanzanian President Benjamin Mkapa	
Rwanda	3	27-29 July	Death of former Tanzanian President Benjamin Mkapa	
East African Community	3	27-29 July	Death of former Tanzanian President Benjamin Mkapa	
Bolivia	3	24-26 July	Death of Óscar Urenda	
Barbados	3	27-29 July	Death of former Prime Minister Owen Seymour Arthur	
Niue	1	27 July	Death of former Premier Toke Talagi	
Taiwan	3	31 July-2 August	Death of former president Lee Teng-hui	
Cuba	1	1 August	Death of Eusebio Leal	
Liberia	5	4-8 August	Death of Munah Pelham-Youngblood	
Lebanon	3	5-7 August	Victims of the 2020 Beirut explosion	
Palestine	1	5 August	Victims of the 2020 Beirut explosion	
Venezuela	3	13-15 August	Death of Darío Vivas	
Vietnam	2	14-15 August	Death of former Party Chief Le Kha Phieu	
Zambia	3	19-21 August	Death of former Vice President Alexander Grey Zulu	
Georgia	1	25 August	Victims of an accident near Dusheti	
Haiti	3	31 August-2 September	Death of Monferrier Dorval	
India	7	31 August-6 September	Death of former president of India Pranab Mukherjee	National mourning from 31 August to 6 September. Official entertainment events canceled.
Bangladesh	1	2 September	Death of former president of India Pranab Mukherjee	2 September was declared a day of national mourning.
Mali	3	16-18 September	Death of former president Moussa Traoré	
Zambia	1	1 September	Death of Ephraim Chibwe	
Ukraine	1	26 September	Victims of the 2020 Chuhuiv An-26 crash	26 September is the day of national mourning.
Kuwait	40	29 September-7 November	Death of Emir Sabah Al-Ahmad Al-Jaber Al-Sabah	Kuwaiti government announced 40 days of national mourning, while deciding to close government and official institutions for three days starting on Tuesday.
Jordan	40	29 September-7 November	Death of Emir Sabah Al-Ahmad Al-Jaber Al-Sabah	Flags flown at half-mast for 40 days of national mourning, including 3 days of general mourning.
Arab League	3	29 September-1 October	Death of Emir Sabah Al-Ahmad Al-Jaber Al-Sabah	
Qatar	3	30 September-2 October	Death of Emir Sabah Al-Ahmad Al-Jaber Al-Sabah	
Bahrain	3	30 September-2 October	Death of Emir Sabah Al-Ahmad Al-Jaber Al-Sabah	
Oman	3	30 September-2 October	Death of Emir Sabah Al-Ahmad Al-Jaber Al-Sabah	Suspension of work in public and private sector starting from Wednesday.
Egypt	3	29 September-1 October	Death of Emir Sabah Al-Ahmad Al-Jaber Al-Sabah	
Libya	3	30 September-2 October	Death of Emir Sabah Al-Ahmad Al-Jaber Al-Sabah	
United Arab Emirates	3	29 September-1 October	Death of Emir Sabah Al-Ahmad Al-Jaber Al-Sabah	
Lebanon	3	30 September-2 October	Death of Emir Sabah Al-Ahmad Al-Jaber Al-Sabah	
Palestine	3	29 September-1 October	Death of Emir Sabah Al-Ahmad Al-Jaber Al-Sabah	
Mauritania	3	30 September-2 October	Death of Emir Sabah Al-Ahmad Al-Jaber Al-Sabah	
Djibouti	2	30 September-1 October	Death of Emir Sabah Al-Ahmad Al-Jaber Al-Sabah	
India	1	4 October	Death of Emir Sabah Al-Ahmad Al-Jaber Al-Sabah	India on Thursday declared one-day state mourning on Sunday 4 October and there were no official entertainment programmes on that day.
Iraq	1	30 September	Death of Emir Sabah Al-Ahmad Al-Jaber Al-Sabah	
Bangladesh	1	1 October	Death of Emir Sabah Al-Ahmad Al-Jaber Al-Sabah	
Cuba	1	1 October	Death of Emir Sabah Al-Ahmad Al-Jaber Al-Sabah	Decreed an official mourning from 06:00 hours to 12:00 pm on this 1 October.
Argentina	1	1 October	Death of cartoonist Quino	
Brunei	7	24-30 October	Death of Prince Azim	
Republic of Congo	1	30 October	Death of former president Joachim Yhombi-Opango	National mourning on 30 October.
Cameroon	1	31 October	Victims of the Kumba school massacre	
Libya	3	2-4 November	Death of Wanis Bukhamada	
Afghanistan	1	3 November	Victims of the 2020 Kabul University attack	
Austria	3	3-5 November	Victims of the Vienna attack	Schools should also observe a minute's silence at the beginning of lessons on Wednesday.
São Tomé and Príncipe	1	6 November	Death of Bernardino Araújo	
Bahrain	7	12-18 November	Death of Prime Minister of Bahrain Khalifa bin Salman Al Khalifa	Bahrain's King ordered a week-long period of mourning and the suspension of all governmental work for three days starting from Thursday.
Bangladesh	1	16 November	Death of Prime Minister of Bahrain Khalifa bin Salman Al Khalifa	
Palestine	3	10-12 November	Death of Saeb Erekat	
Ghana	7	13-19 November	Death of former president Jerry Rawlings	
Mali	3	16-18 November	Death of former president Amadou Toumani Touré	National mourning on 16–18 November.
Portugal	1	12 November	Death of architect Gonçalo Ribeiro Telles	On 12 November, the day of national mourning.
Serbia	3	20-22 November	Death of Serbian Patriarch Orthodox Church Irinej	The government announced three days of national mourning as bells on churches across the country tolled.
Republic of Srpska (Entity of Bosnia and Herzegovina)	3	20-22 November	Death of Serbian Patriarch Orthodox Church Irinej	
Mauritania	3	23-25 November	Death of former president Sidi Ould Cheikh Abdallahi	
Malta	1	25 November	Death of poet Oliver Friggieri	National mourning on 25 November
Niger	3	25-27 November	Death of former president Mamadou Tandja	
Argentina	3	25-27 November	Death of football legend Diego Maradona	
Sudan	3	26-28 November	Death of former Prime Minister Sadiq al-Mahdi	
Portugal	1	2 December	Death of philosopher Eduardo Lourenço	On 2 December, the day of national mourning.
Andorra	3	4-6 December	Death of former president Valéry Giscard d'Estaing	
France	1	9 December	Death of former president Valéry Giscard d'Estaing	9 December is the day of national mourning. All flags were lowered to half-mast.
Uruguay	3	6-8 December	Death of former president Tabare Vasquez	
Zambia	1	11 December	Death of Benjamin Mibenge	
Venezuela	3	14-16 December	Victims of Güiria tragedy	
Niger	3	15-17 December	Victims of an attack on a village on 12 December	
Dominican Republic	1	16 December	Death of Alejandro Grullón	
Armenia	3	19-21 December	Victims of the Second Nagorno-Karabakh War	
Artsakh	3	19-21 December	Victims of the Second Nagorno-Karabakh War	
Tuvalu	1	19 December	Death of former prime minister Saufatu Sopoanga	
Andorra	1	19 December	Death of former prime minister Òscar Ribas Reig	
Dominican Republic	1	21 December	Death of poet and former First Lady Carmen Quidiello	
Papua New Guinea	5	31 December 2020-4 January 2021	Death of former prime minister Mekere Morauta	National mourning period from 31 December 2020 to 4 January 2021. Flags at half mast. Government buildings closed or scaled down operations.

== 2021 ==
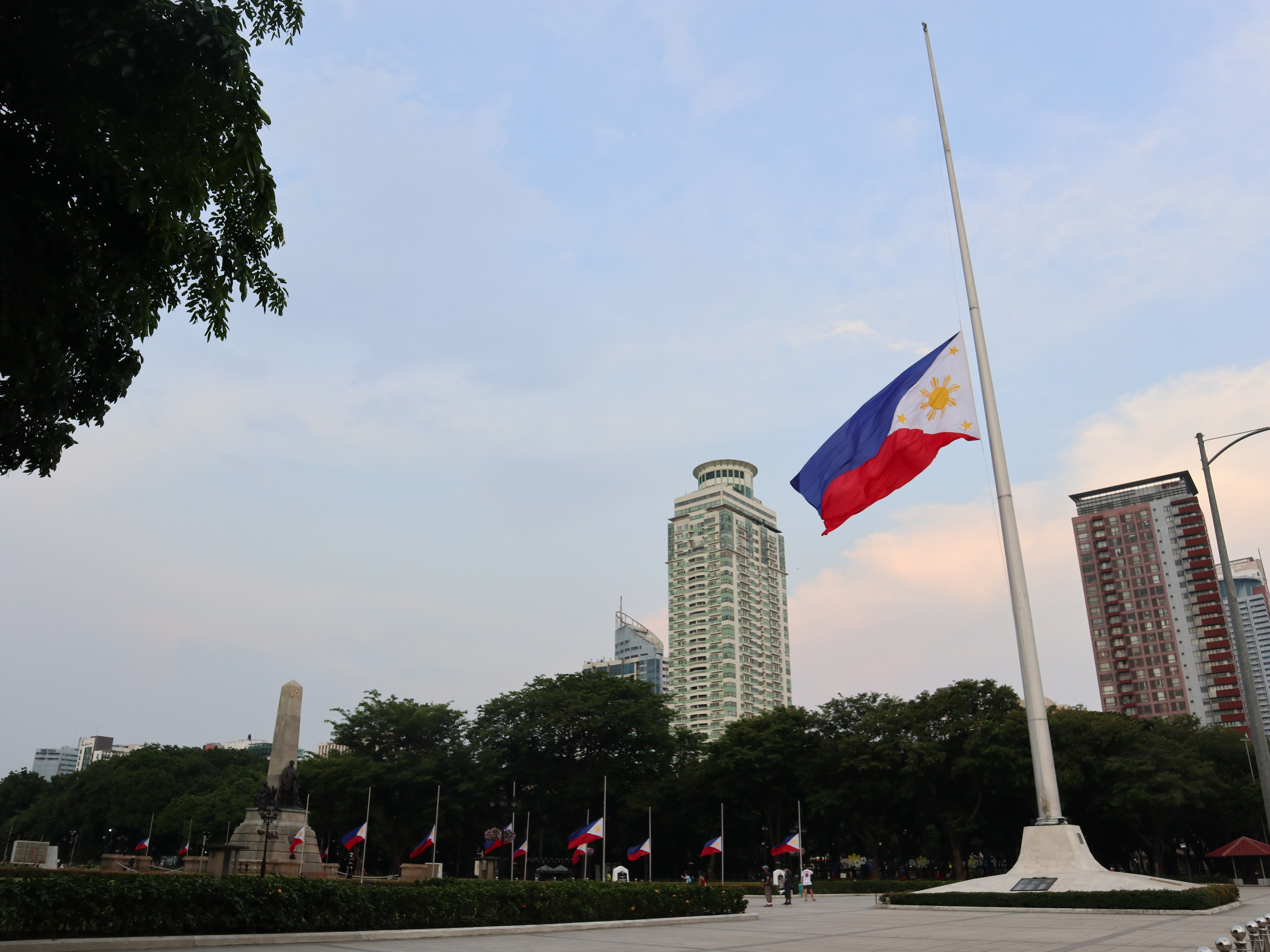
Flag of Philippines at half-mast in Manila following the death of former president Benigno Aquino III in June 2021

Country	Days	Calendar days	Reason	Notes
Croatia	1	2 January	Victims of the 2020 Petrinja earthquake	On 2 January, the day of national mourning.
Bosnia and Herzegovina	1	2 January	Victims of the 2021 Tribistovo poisoning	On 2 January, the day of national mourning.
Croatia	1	5 January	Victims of the 2021 Tribistovo poisoning	On 5 January, the day of national mourning.
Portugal	1	4 January	Death of singer Carlos do Carmo	On 4 January, the day of national mourning.
Zambia	1	4 January	Death of Sarah Sayifwanda	
Niger	3	5–7 January	Victims of the 2021 Tillabéri attacks	
Malawi	3	13–15 January	Death of Lingson Belekanyama and Muhammad Sidik Mia	
Belize	3	20–22 January	Death of former first Governator General Dame Minita Gordon	
Ukraine	1	23 January	Victims of the 2021 Kharkiv fire	
Colombia	3	27–29 January	Death of Defense Minister Carlos Holmes Trujillo and others who died of COVID-19	
Zambia	1	9 February	Death of Sebastian Zulu	
Argentina	3	15–17 February	Death of former president Carlos Menem	
Dominican Republic	1	18 February	Death of Johnny Pacheco	
Ecuador	3	18–20 February	Death of former president Gustavo Noboa	
Zanzibar	7	18–24 February	Death of Zanzibar First Vice President Seif Sharif Hamad	
Tanzania	3	19–21 February	Death of Zanzibar First Vice President Seif Sharif Hamad	
Papua New Guinea	14	26 February – 11 March	Death of former founding prime minister of Papua New Guinea Michael Somare	
Argentina	5	15–19 July	Victims of the COVID-19 pandemic	
Brazil	3	23–25 June	Victims of the COVID-19 pandemic	
Chile	2	10–11 August	Victims of the COVID-19 pandemic	
Canada	1	11 March	Victims of the COVID-19 pandemic	March 11, the one-year anniversary of COVID-19 being declared a pandemic, was designated as a National Day of Observance.
Equatorial Guinea	3	10–12 March	Victims of the 2021 Bata explosions	National mourning from 10 March to 12 March.
Senegal	1	12 March	Victims of the 2021 Senegalese protests	
Ivory Coast	8	12–19 March	Death of Prime Minister Hamed Bakayoko	National mourning from 12 March to 19 March.
Guatemala	3	13–15 March	Death of 16 immigrants in Mexico	
Somalia	3	14–16 March	Death of former president Ali Mahdi Mohamed	
Moldova	1	15 March	Death of Nicolae Dabija	
Haiti	3	16–18 March	4 police officers killed in Village de Dieu	
Panama	1	17 March	Death of former first Vice President Tomas Altamirano Duque	
Niger	3	18–20 March	Victims of an attack in Banibangou	
Mali	3	18–20 March	Soldiers who were killed in clash with terrorists on the axis Lelehoye-Tessit, in the region of Gao	
Tanzania	14	18–31 March	Death of President John Magufuli	22 March was a day off from work. On 25 March and 26 March, the president's funeral day was declared a public holiday, and government offices, banks, businesses, and schools were closed.
Uganda	14	18–31 March	Death of President John Magufuli	
Rwanda	9	18–26 March	Death of President John Magufuli	Mourning period declared from 18 March until 26 March, the burial day.
Kenya	7	18–24 March	Death of President John Magufuli	
Burundi	7	18–24 March	Death of President John Magufuli	
Mozambique	5	20–24 March	Death of President John Magufuli	Mozambique's Council of Ministers ordered a five-day national mourning period from 20–24 March, during which time the national flag also flew at half-mast.
Democratic Republic of the Congo	3	21 March–23	Death of President John Magufuli	
South Sudan	3	21 March–23	Death of President John Magufuli	
Cuba	1	20 March	Death of President John Magufuli	
Zambia	1	25 March	Death of President John Magufuli	
Niger	3	25–27 March	Victims of an attack near Tahoua	
United Arab Emirates	3	25–27 March	Death of former Deputy Prime Minister Minister of Finance Hamdan bin Rashid Al Maktoum	Work suspended in government departments and institutions for three days starting from Thursday.
Sri Lanka	1	25 March	Death of Kotugoda Dhammawasa Thero	
Madagascar	1	29 March	Death of former president Didier Ratsiraka	
Albania	1	29 March	Death of former Prime Minister of Albania Bashkim Fino	29 March was the national day of mourning.
United Kingdom	8	9–17 April	Death of Prince Philip, Duke of Edinburgh	An extended week of mourning was observed by the royal family. First time national mourning was declared in the country since 2002.
British Virgin Islands	8	9–17 April	Death of Prince Philip, Duke of Edinburgh	
Falkland Islands	8	9–17 April	Death of Prince Philip, Duke of Edinburgh	
Canada	1	17 April	Death of Prince Philip, Duke of Edinburgh	An eight-day mourning period was declared from 9 April to 17 April; with national flag placed at half-mast at all federal buildings. First time mourning was declared in the country since 2010. 17 April was designated a national day of mourning.
Georgia	1	10 April	4 citizens drowned in the Enguri River	
Dominican Republic	1	12 April	Death of Marcio Veloz Maggiolo	
Chad	14	21 April – 4 May	Death of President Idriss Déby	The president died at the front with the rebels on Northern Chad offensive. The army declared a 14-day period of national mourning and imposed an overnight curfew. Air borders closed until further notice. Government offices, banks and schools were closed while the situation in the country stabilized.
Mali	3	21–23 April	Death of President Idriss Déby	National mourning on 21–23 April.
South Sudan	3	21–23 April	Death of President Idriss Déby	
Cuba	1	23 April	Death of President Idriss Déby	
Democratic Republic of the Congo	1	23 April	Death of President Idriss Déby	National mourning on 23 April, the day of Déby's funeral.
Guinea	1	23 April	Death of President Idriss Déby	
Republic of the Congo	1	23 April	Death of President Idriss Déby	
Namibia	1	22 April	Death of Joseph Ndeshipanda Kashea, Fillipus Nandenga and Salomon Frederick Gamatham	Three war veterans died in the same period (11–14 April). The day of national mourning was on 22 April.
Argentina	3	25–27 April	Death of Minister of Transport Mario Meoni	
Iraq	3	26–28 April	Victims of Baghdad hospital fire	
Uruguay	1	28 April	Death of former Vice President Gonzalo Aguirre Ramírez	
Jordan	7	1–7 May	Death of Prince Muhammad bin Talal	
Kyrgyzstan	2	1–2 May	Victims of the 2021 Kyrgyzstan-Tajikistan conflict	National mourning on 1–2 May.
Israel	1	2 May	Victims of the 2021 Meron stampede	2 May is the day of national mourning. Many cultural activities were cancelled.
Mexico	3	4–6 May	Victims of the Mexico City Metro overpass collapse	National mourning on 4–6 May.
Santa Catarina (state of Brazil)	3	5–7 May	Victims of the Saudades massacre	
Chile	1	7 May	Death of Humberto Maturana	
Trinidad and Tobago	1	8 May	Death of Franklin Khan	
Afghanistan	1	11 May	Victims of the 2021 Puli Alam bombing and 2021 Kabul school bombing	11 May was the national day of mourning.
Zambia	1	19 May	Death of Joseph Chilengi	
Dominican Republic	1	19 May	Death of Pedro Romero Confesor	
Sahrawi Arab Democratic Republic	7	28 May – 3 June	Death of Sidi Ahmed El Batal	
Mauritius	2	5–6 June	Death of former prime minister and president Anerood Jugnauth	
India	1	5 June	Death of former prime minister and president Anerood Jugnauth	
Burkina Faso	3	7–9 June	Victims of the Solhan and Tadaryat massacres	
Dominican Republic	1	8 June	Death of Leandro Guzmán	
Moldova	1	9 June	Death of Iurie Sadovnic	
Brazil	3	13–15 June	Death of former Vice President Marco Maciel	
Nicaragua	3	15–17 June	Death of former president and Vice President Enrique Bolaños	
Namibia	3	18–20 June	Death of John Sinvula Mutwa	
Zimbabwe	3	17–19 June	Death of Emmanuel Francis Ribeiro	
Zambia	21	19 June – 9 July	Death of first President Kenneth Kaunda	All flags were lowered to half-mast. All entertainment events were canceled. 2 July and 7 July were declared bank holidays.
Zimbabwe	14	19 June – 2 July	Death of first President Kenneth Kaunda	Initially was 3 days of mourning.
South Africa	10	19–28 June	Death of first President Kenneth Kaunda	
Botswana	7	19–25 June	Death of first President Kenneth Kaunda	
Malawi	7	19–25 June	Death of first President Kenneth Kaunda	
Namibia	7	19–25 June	Death of first President Kenneth Kaunda	National mourning on 19–25 June. All flags were lowered to half-mast.
Tanzania	7	19–25 June	Death of first President Kenneth Kaunda	
Mozambique	6	19–24 June	Death of first President Kenneth Kaunda	
South Sudan	3	22–24 June	Death of first President Kenneth Kaunda	
Cuba	1	21 June	Death of first President Kenneth Kaunda	June 21 is the day of national mourning.
Philippines	10	24 June – 3 July	Death of former president Benigno Aquino III	A period of national mourning was announced from 24 June to 3 July. All national flags were flown at half-mast as a sign of mourning.
Dominican Republic	1	4 July	Death of Tirso Mejía Ricart	
Haiti	3	6–8 July	Death of Chief Justice of the Supreme Court of Haiti René Sylvestre	
Dominican Republic	1	7 July	Death of Jose Nicolas Almanzar	
Mozambique	2	8–9 July	Victims of Manhica road crash	
Bolivia	3	13–15 July	Victims of the Chataquila accident	
Haiti	16	8–23 July	Assassination of President of Haiti Jovenel Moïse	Two weeks of national mourning were announced from 8 to 23 July. Flags were lowered to half-mast on all public buildings. Government officials have announced that businesses, schools, and public administration offices must close nationwide 22–23 July. Haiti's borders and international airport are closed and martial law has been imposed after Haiti's acting prime minister declared a state of siege.
Caribbean Community	4	7–9 July and 23	Assassination of President of Haiti Jovenel Moïse	CARICOM Standard and national flags were flown at half-staff for 3 days starting from Wednesday 7 July to Friday 9 July and on funeral day of Haitian president.
Suriname	3	8–10 July	Assassination of President of Haiti Jovenel Moïse	
Argentina	2	9–10 July	Death of Carlos Reutemann	
Iraq	3	14–16 July	Victims of Nasiriyah hospital fire	
Belgium	1	20 July	Victims of flooding	20 July - day of national mourning. Flags were lowered to half-mast.
Kosovo	1	26 July	Victims of a bus crash in Slavonski Brod	26 July day of mourning with flags at half-staff and parliament postponed its session Monday in memory of 10 Kosovars who died when their bus crashed in Croatia. The victims in the bus crash were all Kosovans.
Dominican Republic	3	29–31 July	Death of Johnny Ventura	
Malawi	2	3–4 August	Victims of the August 2021 Malawi accident	
Sahrawi Arab Democratic Republic	7	3–9 August	Death of Abdellah Lahbib	
Mali	3	6–8 August	Victims of the Ségou bus-truck collision	
Mali	3	11–13 August	Victims of the Karou and Ouatagouna massacres	
Guinea-Bissau	2	11–12 August	Death of Mamadu Saido Baldé	
Algeria	3	12–14 August	Victims of the 2021 Algeria wildfires	National mourning from 12 to 14 August. Flags lowered to half-mast.
Haiti	3	18–20 August	Victims of the 2021 Haiti earthquake	
Niger	2	19–20 August	Victims of the August 2021 Banibangou attack	
Burkina Faso	3	19–21 August	Victims of the Arbinda massacre	
Antigua and Barbuda	3	24–26 August	Death of former prime minister of Antigua and Barbuda Lester Bird	Official mourning period on 24–26 August.
Liechtenstein	7	22–28 August	Death of Marie, Princess of Liechtenstein	National mourning from 22 to 28 August. All public buildings are marked in the national colors and the colors of the Prince's House. Many cultural events were cancelled, other events were preceded by a minute of silence and restraint.
Pakistan	1	3 September	Death of Syed Ali Shah Geelani	
Greece	3	3–5 September	Death of Mikis Theodorakis	National mourning from 3 to 5 September.
Lebanon	2	6–7 September	Death of Sheikh Abdel Amir Qabalan	
North Macedonia	3	9–11 September	Victims of the 2021 Tetovo hospital fire	National mourning on 9–11 September.
Namibia	2	11 September	Death of Marco Mukoso Hausiku	
Portugal	3	11 September–13	Death of former president Jorge Sampaio	National mourning on 11–13 September, with State funeral.
East Timor	3	11 September–13	Death of former president Jorge Sampaio	
Algeria	3	18–20 September	Death of former president Abdelaziz Bouteflika	National mourning on 18–20 September. Flags on government and public buildings lowered to half-mast during the period of national mourning.
Cuba	1	20 September	Death of former president Abdelaziz Bouteflika	
Egypt	3	21–23 September	Death of former head of state Mohamed Hussein Tantawi	National mourning on 21–23 September.
Algeria	3	23–25 September	Death of former Head of State Abdelkader Bensalah	National mourning on 23–25 September. Flags on government and public buildings lowered to half-mast during the period of national mourning.
East Timor	3	25–27 September	Death of Ma'huno Bulerek Karathayano	
Dominica	3	30 September – 2 October	Death of first prime minister Patrick John	Flags at half mast.
Central African Republic	3	7–9 October	Victims of the Matchika massacre	
Lebanon	1	15 October	Victims of the 2021 Beirut clashes	
Greece	1	27 October	Death of Fofi Gennimata	
Dominican Republic	1	30 October	Death of Reinaldo Pared Pérez	
Niger	2	5–6 November	Victims of the November 2021 Banibangou attack	
Moldova	1	5 November	Death of Valentina Rusu-Ciobanu	
Sierra Leone	3	9–11 November	Victims of the Freetown fuel tanker explosion	
Burkina Faso	3	15–17 November	Victims of the 2021 Inata attack	
South Africa	4	17–21 November	Death of former president Frederik Willem de Klerk	National mourning from 17 November to 21 November. All national flags were lowered to half-mast.
North Macedonia	3	23–25 November	Victims of the 2021 Bulgaria bus crash	National mourning on 23–25 November.
Kosovo	1	24 November	Victims of the 2021 Bulgaria bus crash	
Bulgaria	1	24 November	Victims of a fire at a nursing home in Royak and the 2021 Bulgaria bus crash	24 November was a day of national mourning. Flags on government and public buildings were lowered to half-mast.
Saint Vincent and the Grenadines	3	24–26 November	Death of former prime minister James Fitz-Allen Mitchell	Flags at half mast.
Nauru	1	30 November	Death of former president Kinza Clodumar	
Mali	3	6–8 December	Victims of the 2021 Songho attacks	
India	1	9 December	Death of Bipin Rawat in a helicopter crash	
Guatemala	3	14–16 December	Victims of the Chiapas truck crash	
Haiti	3	16–18 December	Victims of the Cap-Haïtien fuel tanker explosion	
Mozambique	1	17 December	Death of Sérgio Vieira (politician)	
Madagascar	1	21 December	Victims of the 2021 Madagascar shipwreck	
Burkina Faso	2	27–28 December	Victims of an attack	At least 41 killed.
South Africa	7	28 December 2021 – 3 January 2022	Death of Archbishop and Nobel Peace Prize laureate Desmond Tutu	
Greece	3	27–29 December	Death of former president Karolos Papoulias	National mourning on 27–29 December. Flags on government and public buildings were lowered to half-mast.

== 2022 ==
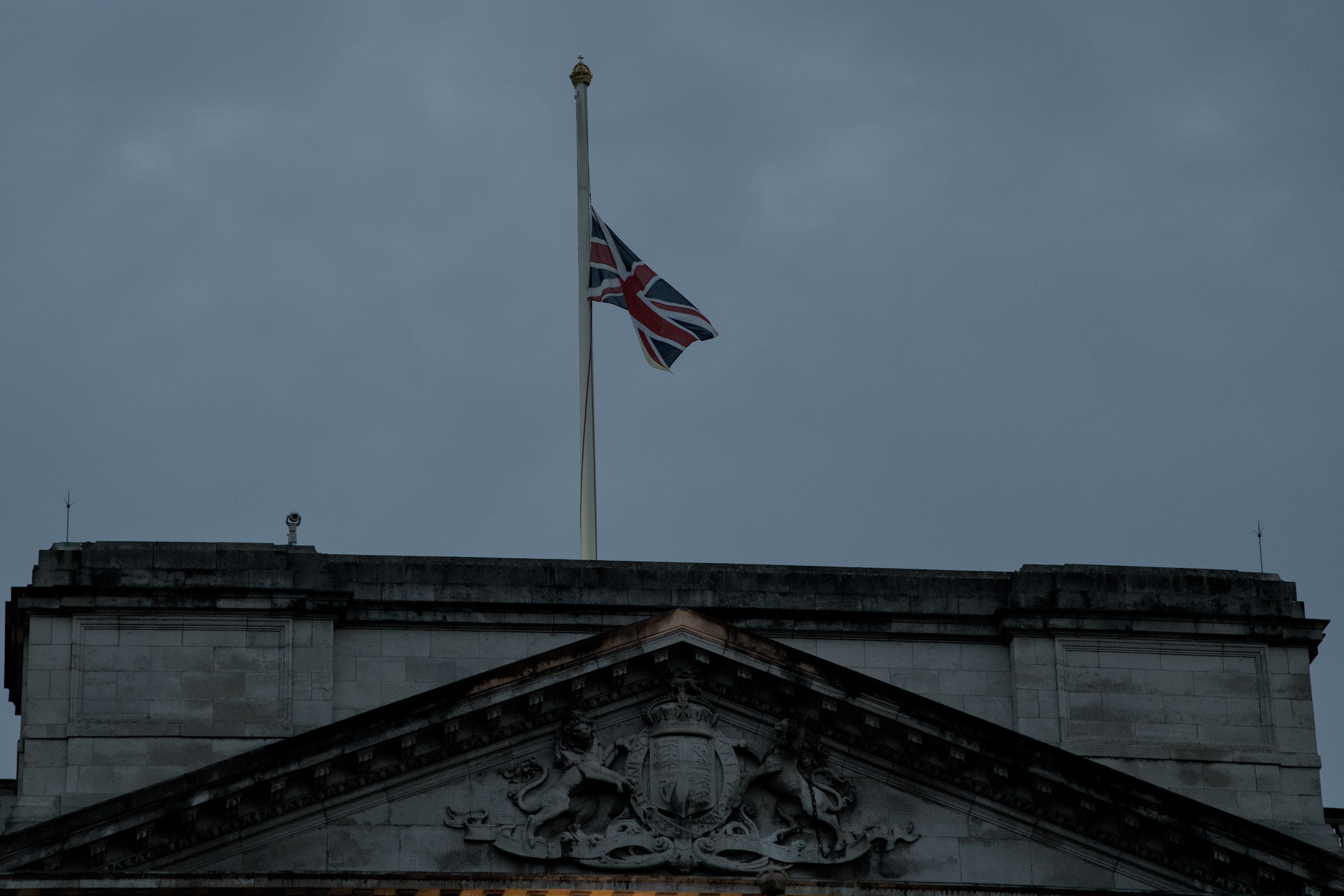
British flag at half-mast following the death of Queen Elizabeth II in September 2022

Country	Number of Days	Calendar days	Reason	Notes
Palestine	1	7 January	Victims of the 2022 West Bank bus crash	7 January was the day of national mourning.
Kazakhstan	1	10 January	Victims of the Kazakh protests	10 January is the day of national mourning. National flags lowered to half-mast on all government and public buildings. Sports and other events suspended due to the introduction of a state of emergency throughout the country.
Mali	3	21–23 January	Death of former president Ibrahim Boubacar Keïta	National mourning from 21 January to 23 January.
Liberia	3	24–26 January	Victims of a stampede	
Dominican Republic	1	24 January	Death of Agripino Núñez Collado	
Mozambique	2	26–27 January	Victims of a bus accident	
Brazil	1	27 January	Death of Olavo de Carvalho	
Greece	3	3–5 February	Death of former president Christos Sartzetakis	National mourning on 3–5 February. All national flags lowered to half-mast.
Guinea-Bissau	2	6–8 February	Victims of the 2022 Guinea-Bissau coup attempt	
India	2	7–8 February	Death of Singer Lata Mangeshkar	India declared a 2-day national mourning period and flags were flown at half mast. Gov't of Maharashtra declared a holiday on 7 Feb and Gov't of West Bengal declared a half-day holiday.
Dominica	1	11 February	Death of Bryson Joseph Louis	
Belize	3	14–16 February	Death of former prime minister Manuel Esquivel	Flags at half mast.
Spain	1	22 February	Capsizing of the Villa de Pitanxo	
Guatemala	3	26–28 February	Death of former vice president Roberto Carpio	
Comoros	3	27 February – 1 March	Victims of AB Aviation Flight 1103	
Mauritius	1	12 March	Death of former president Karl Offmann	
Mali	3	14–16 March	In memory of the 27 soldiers killed in Douentza	
Zambia	7	14–20 March	Death of former president Rupiah Banda	
Namibia	3	16–18 March	Death of former president Rupiah Banda	National mourning from 16 March to 18 March. State flags lowered to half-mast.
Uganda	16	21 March – 5 April	Death of speaker of parliament Jacob Oulanyah	Flags were ordered at half mast for the burial process
Kosovo	1	25 March	Death of Madeleine Albright	
Moldova	1	4 April	Victims of the 2022 Russian invasion of Ukraine	
Latvia	1	9 May	Victims of the 2022 Russian invasion of Ukraine	
Portugal	1	19 April	Death of actress Eunice Muñoz	The day of her funeral on 19 April was a National Day of Mourning.
Saint Kitts and Nevis	11	20–30 April	Death of former Premier of Nevis Vance Amory	
Kenya	9	22–30 April	Death of former Kenyan President Mwai Kibaki	State funeral declared a public holiday, schools and most businesses were closed.
South Sudan	3	24–26 April	Death of former Kenyan President Mwai Kibaki	
Tanzania	2	29–30 April	Death of former Kenyan President Mwai Kibaki	National mourning from 29 to 30 April. State flags lowered to half-mast.
Lebanon	1	25 April	Victims of a capsized boat	
Ivory Coast	3	13–15 May	Death of president of the National Assembly Amadou Soumahoro	
Cuba	2	13–14 May	Victims of the Hotel Saratoga explosion	National mourning from 13 to 14 May. Flags lowered to half-mast.
United Arab Emirates	40	14 May-June 23	Death of President Khalifa bin Zayed Al Nahyan	All federal and local government departments, ministries, and private firms suspended their operations for three days beginning 14 May.
Jordan	40	14 May-June 23	Death of President Khalifa bin Zayed Al Nahyan	
Kuwait	40	14 May-June 23	Death of President Khalifa bin Zayed Al Nahyan	His Highness Sheikh Nawaf Al-Ahmad Al-Jaber Al-Sabah ordered a 40-day mourning and flags flown at half mast while government departments would cease working for three days as of Friday.
Arab League	3	15–17 May	Death of President Khalifa bin Zayed Al Nahyan	Arab League flag lowered at half-mast.
Oman	3	13–15 May	Death of President Khalifa bin Zayed Al Nahyan	National mourning from 13 May to 15 May. The flags were lowered to half-mast.
Bahrain	3	14–16 May	Death of President Khalifa bin Zayed Al Nahyan	
Qatar	3	14–16 May	Death of President Khalifa bin Zayed Al Nahyan	
Saudi Arabia	3	14–16 May	Death of President Khalifa bin Zayed Al Nahyan	All recreational and sports events and celebrations that were to take place until Monday, 16 May in all regions of the Kingdom were postponed however flags were not put at half mast.
Egypt	3	14–16 May	Death of President Khalifa bin Zayed Al Nahyan	
Lebanon	3	14–16 May	Death of President Khalifa bin Zayed Al Nahyan	
Mauritania	3	14–16 May	Death of President Khalifa bin Zayed Al Nahyan	
Morocco	3	14–16 May	Death of President Khalifa bin Zayed Al Nahyan	
Maldives	3	14–16 May	Death of President Khalifa bin Zayed Al Nahyan	National mourning from 14–16 May.
Brazil	3	14–16 May	Death of President Khalifa bin Zayed Al Nahyan	
Pakistan	3	14–16 May	Death of President Khalifa bin Zayed Al Nahyan	
Algeria	2	13–14 May	Death of President Khalifa bin Zayed Al Nahyan	National mourning on 13–14 May.
Palestine	1	14 May	Death of President Khalifa bin Zayed Al Nahyan	May 14 is the day of national mourning. Flags lowered to half-mast
India	1	14 May	Death of President Khalifa bin Zayed Al Nahyan	14 May is the day of national mourning. Flags lowered to half-mast. Official entertainment suspended.
Bangladesh	1	14 May	Death of President Khalifa bin Zayed Al Nahyan	
Cuba	1	17 May	Death of President Khalifa bin Zayed Al Nahyan	May 17 is the day of national mourning. Flags lowered to half-mast.
Cayman Islands	1	20 May	Death of Sybil I. McLaughlin	
Senegal	3	27–29 May	Victims of a fire in a hospital	
Iran	1	29 May	Victims of the Abadan building collapse	29 May is the day of national mourning.
Albania	1	2 June	Death of former president Bujar Nishani	On 2 June, he was proclaimed a day of national mourning. Flags lowered to half-mast.
São Tomé and Príncipe	5	5–9 June	Death of former president Evaristo Carvalho	
Nigeria	7	6–12 June	Victims of the Owo church attack	
Dominican Republic	3	7–9 June	Death of Minister of Environment and Natural Resources Orlando Jorge Mera	National mourning on 7–9 June.
Iran	1	9 June	Victims of the 2022 South Khorasan train derailment	9 June is the day of national mourning.
Cyprus	3	9–11 June	Death of Labour Minister of Cyprus Zeta Emilianidou	
Portugal	1	9 June	Death of Paula Rego	
Burkina Faso	3	14–16 June	Victims of the Seytenga massacre	National mourning from 14–16 June
Zambia	1	21 June	Death of Sikota Wina	
DR Congo	4	June 27-30	Burial of first Prime Minister Patrice Lumumba	
South Sudan	3	28–30 June	Death of Manawa Peter Gatkuoth	
US Virgin Islands	8	July 3-10	Death of former governor Charles Wesley Turnbull	
Brazil	3	9–11 July	Assassination of former Prime Minister Shinzo Abe	
Bangladesh	1	9 July	Assassination of former Prime Minister Shinzo Abe	9 July is the day of mourning.
Bhutan	1	9 July	Assassination of former Prime Minister Shinzo Abe	
India	1	9 July	Assassination of former Prime Minister Shinzo Abe	9 July is the day of mourning.
Nepal	1	9 July	Assassination of former Prime Minister Shinzo Abe	9 July is the day of mourning.
Cambodia	1	10 July	Assassination of former Prime Minister Shinzo Abe	10 July is the day of mourning.Flags lowered to half-mast. Entertainment clubs, bars, discos and beer gardens closed on the day of national mourning.
Taiwan	1	10 July	Assassination of former Prime Minister Shinzo Abe	
Cuba	1	11 July	Assassination of former Prime Minister Shinzo Abe	On 11 July, the day of national mourning, flags lowered to the middle of the mast on all public buildings.
Sri Lanka	1	12 July	Assassination of former Prime Minister Shinzo Abe	12 July is the day of mourning.
Angola	7	9–15 July	Death of former president José Eduardo dos Santos	Initially 5 days of mourning. State flags were lowered to half-mast and public events canceled.
Mozambique	5	15–19 July	Death of former president José Eduardo dos Santos	
Cuba	1	9 July	Death of former president José Eduardo dos Santos	9 July was a day of national mourning. Flags lowered to half-mast.
Democratic Republic of the Congo	1	10 July	Death of former president José Eduardo dos Santos	
São Tomé and Príncipe	1	15 July	Death of former president José Eduardo dos Santos	
Brazil	1	16 July	Death of Luiz of Orléans-Braganza	
Peru	1	16 July	Death of former president Francisco Remigio Morales Bermúdez Cerrutti	
Iraq	1	22 July	Victims of the Zakho resort attack	
Georgia	1	30 July	Victims of the 2022 Gudauri helicopter crash	
Paraguay	3	1–3 August	Death of Senator Zulma Gómez	
Philippines	10	31 July – 9 August	Death of former president Fidel V. Ramos	31 July to 9 August as national days of mourning, the national flag shall be flown at half-mast from sunrise to sunset, on all government buildings and installations throughout the Philippines and abroad, for a period of 10 days.
Mali	3	12–14 August	Victims of the 2022 Tessit attack	
Montenegro	3	13–15 August	Victims of the 2022 Cetinje shooting	National mourning on 13–15 August. Flags flew half-mast. Matches and other sports events were cancelled.
Micronesia	At least 2	16-17 August	Death of Vice President Yosiwo George	
Armenia	2	17 August–18	Victims of the 2022 Yerevan explosion	
Artsakh	2	17 August–18	Victims of the 2022 Yerevan explosion	
Kyrgyzstan	1	23 August	Victims of a road accident in Russia	At least 16 people (14 Kyrgyz citizens) were killed.23 August was day of mourning.
New Zealand	18	9 September–26	Death of Elizabeth II	A period of national mourning started immediately after the announcement of the Queen Elizabeth II's death on 9 September 2022. It continued until the end of the day of the New Zealand Memorial Service on 26 September. Public holiday on 26 September. Further information: Operation London Bridge § New Zealand
Niue	18	9 September–26	Death of Elizabeth II	
Botswana	11	9-19 September	Death of Elizabeth II	
United Kingdom	10	9–18 September	Death of Elizabeth II	At the time of the announcement of the queen's death, almost all BBC channels and commercial TV and radio stations interrupted their normal program to cover the death of the queen, and were broadcasting calmer and subdued music. Flags were lowered to half-mast on all government, public, municipal and private buildings. All sporting events in the UK scheduled through the weekend are expected to be postponed. Many public events were canceled. On 19 September, the Queen's state funeral day was declared a public holiday, and on that day public offices, government offices, schools, colleges, universities, and many businesses, public places and shops were closed. Main article: Operation London Bridge
Canada	10	9–18 September	Death of Elizabeth II	A ten-day period of mourning was declared. Half-masting of the national flag was effective from the day of the passing until sunset on the day of the funeral, with the exception of the day on which the new Monarch is proclaimed. 19 September, the date of the funeral for Queen Elizabeth II was a national holiday and national day of mourning in Canada. Further information: Operation London Bridge § Canada
Malawi	10	11–20 September	Death of Elizabeth II	
Rwanda	10	11–20 September	Death of Elizabeth II	
Saint Vincent and the Grenadines	10	10–19 September	Death of Elizabeth II	
Belize	10	9–18 September	Death of Elizabeth II	
Saint Lucia	10	10–19 September	Death of Elizabeth II	
Antigua and Barbuda	10	9–18 September	Death of Elizabeth II	
Saint Kitts and Nevis	10	9–18 September	Death of Elizabeth II	
Grenada	10	9–18 September	Death of Elizabeth II	
Papua New Guinea	10	12–21 September	Death of Elizabeth II	
Tuvalu	10	9–18 September	Death of Elizabeth II	
Pitcairn Islands	10	9–18 September	Death of Elizabeth II	
Cayman Islands	10	9–18 September	Death of Elizabeth II	
Saint Helena, Ascension and Tristan da Cunha	10	9–18 September	Death of Elizabeth II	
Falkland Islands	10	9–18 September	Death of Elizabeth II	
Gibraltar	10	9–18 September	Death of Elizabeth II	
Ghana	7	9–15 September	Death of Elizabeth II	
Jordan	7	9–15 September	Death of Elizabeth II	
Tanzania	5	11–15 September	Death of Elizabeth II	
Lebanon	4	9–11 September and 18	Death of Elizabeth II	Three days from 9 to 11 Sept. and an additional day for the funeral of the queen, scheduled for 18 Sept..
Bangladesh	3	9–11 September	Death of Elizabeth II	National mourning from 9 to 11 September. Flags lowered to half-mast.
Brazil	3	9–11 September	Death of Elizabeth II	
Kuwait	3	10–12 September	Death of Elizabeth II	National mourning from 9 to 12 September. Flags lowered to half-mast.
Bahrain	3	10–12 September	Death of Elizabeth II	
Oman	3	10–12 September	Death of Elizabeth II	
United Arab Emirates	3	10–12 September	Death of Elizabeth II	Flags at the country's embassies and in the public and private sector flew at half-mast for three days, Friday, 9 September. It lasted for a total of three days ending on Monday, 12 September.
Nepal	3	10–12 September	Death of Elizabeth II	
Solomon Islands	3	12–14 September	Death of Elizabeth II	Three days of mourning starting from Monday 12 to Wednesday 14 September.
Kenya	3		Death of Elizabeth II	
Portugal	3	18–20 September	Death of Elizabeth II	18–20 September declared national day of mourning.
Mozambique	3	17–19 September	Death of Elizabeth II	National mourning, from 17 to 19 September September.
Maldives	3	9–11 September	Death of Elizabeth II	National mourning from 9 to 11 September September.
Dominica	2	12–13 September	Death of Elizabeth II	Dominica observed two days of national mourning on Monday, 12 September and Tuesday, 13 September, flags on all public buildings in the state was flown at half-mast on the days of mourning.
Trinidad and Tobago	2	9–10 September	Death of Elizabeth II	
Australia	1	22 September	Death of Elizabeth II	Australia held a day of mourning as a memorial service for the late queen. Flags are at half-mast from 9 September to the morning of 20 September. Public holiday was declared on 22 September. Further information: Operation London Bridge § Australia
Cocos (Keeling) Islands	1	22 September	Death of Elizabeth II	
Christmas Island	1	22 September	Death of Elizabeth II	
Norfolk Island	1	22 September	Death of Elizabeth II	
Bhutan	1	9 September	Death of Elizabeth II	
Cuba	1	9 September	Death of Elizabeth II	Official mourning from 06:00 hours to 12:00 hours 9 September.
Seychelles	1	10 September	Death of Elizabeth II	
India	1	11 September	Death of Elizabeth II	September 11 is declared a day of national mourning. Flags lowered to half-mast and there were no official entertainment on the day.
Pakistan	1	12 September	Death of Elizabeth II	Declared 12 September to be a national day of mourning.
Jamaica	1	19 September	Death of Elizabeth II	Half mast flags between 8 September and 19 September to be the national day of mourning.
Guyana	1	19 September	Death of Elizabeth II	19 September a national day of mourning.
Malta	1	19 September	Death of Elizabeth II	National day of mourning on 19 September.
Mauritius	1	19 September	Death of Elizabeth II	
The Bahamas	1	19 September	Death of Elizabeth II	September 19, the national day of mourning.
Sri Lanka	1	19 September	Death of Elizabeth II	September 19 declared a day of national mourning. Flags lowered to half-mast.
Zambia	1	19 September	Death of Elizabeth II	19 September declared a day of national mourning.
Costa Rica	3	19–21 September	Victims of the 2022 Alajuela bus crash	
Guatemala	3	19–21 September	Victims of the 2022 Quetzaltenango tragedy	
Kyrgyzstan	1	19 September	Victims of the 2022 Kyrgyzstan-Tajikistan clashes	19 September was national day of mourning.
Venezuela	3	10–12 October	Victims of landslides	
Chad	7	25–31 October	Victims of the 2022 Chadian protests	Mourning from 25 to 31 October
South Korea	7	30 October – 5 November	Victims of the Seoul Halloween crowd crush	President Yoon Suk-yeol announced a period of national mourning that ran until 5 November. State flags were lowered to half-mast. Concerts and other public events were cancelled.
Malta	2	6–7 November	Death of former Prime Minister Karmenu Mifsud Bonnici	National mourning on 6–7 November.
Cyprus	6	8–13 November	Death of Chrysostomos II of Cyprus	
Palestine	1	18 November	Victims of the 2022 Jabalia fire	
Argentina	3	21–23 November	Death of Hebe de Bonafini	
Chad	3	23–25 November	Victims of the 2022 Bouka-Toulloroum attack	
China	7	30 November-December 6	Death of former Chinese leader Jiang Zemin	Half mast flags and websites turned in black and white starting from 30 November to 6 December, when the memorial service was held.
Hong Kong	7	30 November-December 6	Death of former Chinese leader Jiang Zemin	Half mast flags and websites turned in black and white starting from 30 November to 6 December, when the memorial service was held.
Macao	7	30 November-December 6	Death of former Chinese leader Jiang Zemin	Half mast flags and websites turned in black and white starting from 30 November to 6 December, when the memorial service was held.
Cuba	1	1 December	Death of former Chinese leader Jiang Zemin	Official mourning 1 December from 06:00 till 12:00 hours. National flag at half-mast in public buildings and military institutions.
Brazil	1	13 December	Death of Jonas Abib	
Democratic Republic of the Congo	3	15–17 December	Victims of the 2022 Kinshasa floods	
Brazil	3	29–31 December	Death of footballer Pelé	

== 2023 ==
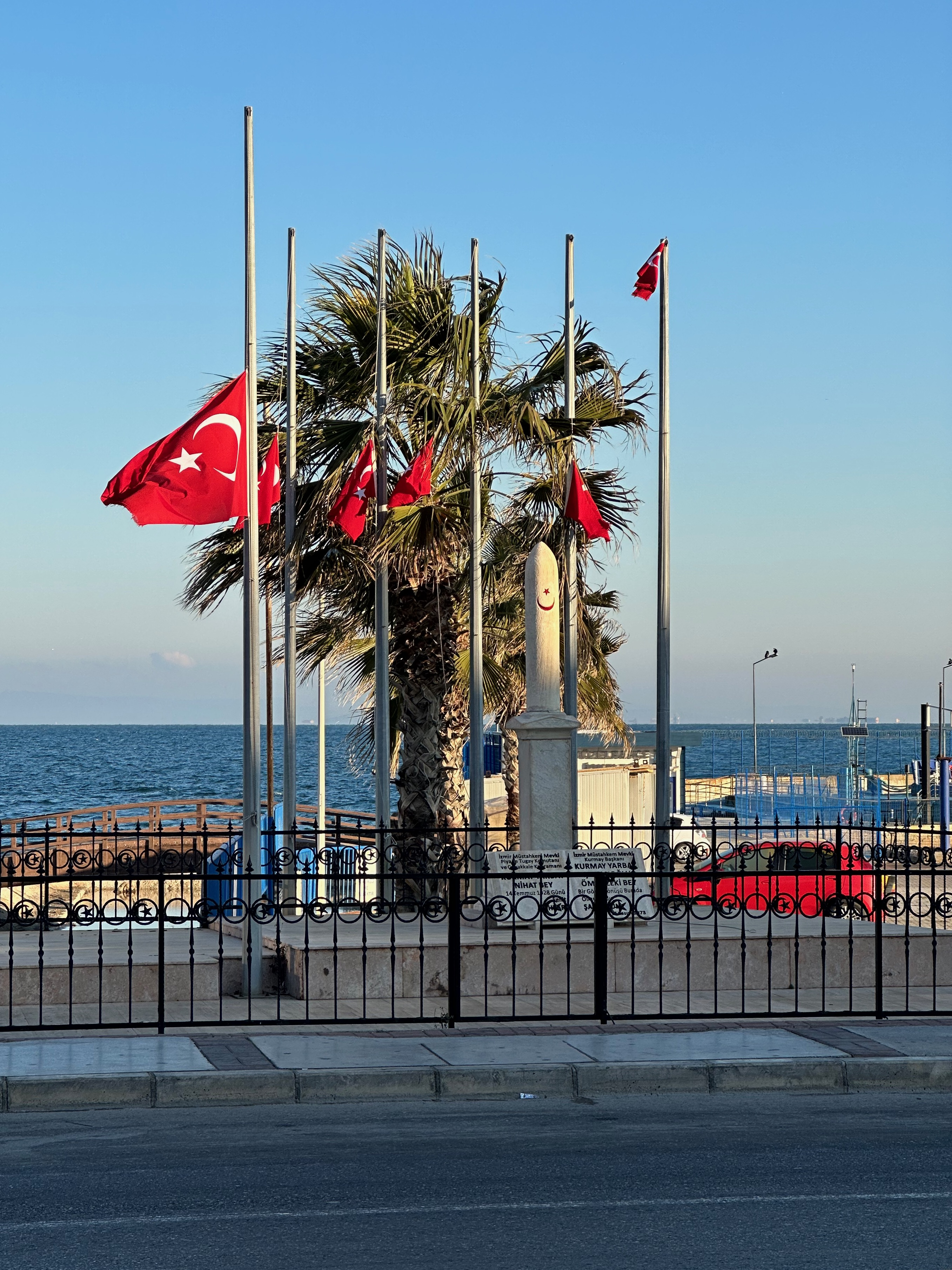
Turkish flags at half-mast in Güzelbahçe, İzmir following the Turkey–Syria earthquakes in February 2023

Country	Number of Days	Calendar days	Reason	Notes
Costa Rica	4	31 December 2022 – 3 January 2023	Death of former Pope Benedict XVI	National mourning on 31 December 2022, to 3 January 2023. State flags at half mast on all government, local government and public buildings.
Brazil	2	1–2 January	Death of former Pope Benedict XVI	
Portugal	1	5 January	Death of former Pope Benedict XVI	National mourning on 5 January 2023. State flags at half mast.
Cuba	1	5 January	Death of former Pope Benedict XVI	
Senegal	3	8–10 January	Victims of the Kaffrine bus crash	
Peru	1	11 January	Victims of 2022-2023 Peruvian protests	
Lebanon	3	11–13 January	Death of Hussein Husseini	
Nepal	1	16 January	Victims of the Yeti Airlines Flight 691 crash	All 72 people aboard the aircraft were killed
South Africa	7	17–23 January	Death of Frene Ginwala	
Gambia	7	19–25 January	Death of Vice President Badara Alieu Joof	
Guatemala	3	24–26 January	Death of former president Alvaro Colom	
Palestine	3	26–28 January	Victims of the 2023 Jenin incursion	
Turkey	7	6 February–12	Victims of the 2023 Turkey–Syria earthquakes	National mourning on 6–12 February. State flags on all government, local government and public buildings and in all embassies were lowered to half mast. All schools and universities in the country were closed until 20 February. All sporting events in Turkey were cancelled
Northern Cyprus	7	6 February–12	Victims of the 2023 Turkey–Syria earthquakes	
Albania	1	13 February	Victims of the 2023 Turkey–Syria earthquakes	National mourning on 13 February.
North Macedonia	1	13 February	Victims of the 2023 Turkey–Syria earthquakes	National mourning on 13 February.
Bangladesh	1	9 February	Victims of the 2023 Turkey–Syria earthquakes	National mourning on 9 February.
Kosovo	1	8 February	Victims of the 2023 Turkey–Syria earthquakes	National mourning on 8 February 2023. State flags at half mast.
Croatia	1	14 February	Death of Miroslav Blažević	
Zambia	1	16 February	Death of Mwansa Beenwell Kapeya	
Greece	3	1–3 March	Victims of the 2023 Thessaly train collision.	National mourning on 1–3 March.
Cyprus	3	3–5 March	Victims of the 2023 Thessaly train collision.	
Albania	1	5 March	Victims of the 2023 Thessaly train collision.	National mourning on 5 March.
Haiti	3	5–7 March	Death of former prime minister Gérald Latortue	
Gabon	3	14–16 March	Victims of the Esther Miracle	
Malawi	14	17–30 March	Victims of Cyclone Freddy	
Chile	2	20–21 March	Death of Jorge Edwards	
Mozambique	2	27–28 March	Death of former prime minister Pascoal Mocumbi	
Guatemala	3	29–31 March	Guatemalan victims of a fire in Mexico	
Papua New Guinea	1	18 April	Death of former prime minister Rabbie Namaliu	Flags at half-mast. The day of the funeral was declared a public holiday.
Cape Verde	2	2–3 April	Death of 7 soldiers in an accident	
Dominica	2	4–5 April	Death of flag designer Alwin Bully	
India	2	26–27 April	Death of Parkash Singh Badal (former Chief Minister of Punjab)	National mourning on 26–27 April.
Serbia	3	5–7 May	Victims of the Belgrade school shooting and Mladenovac and Smederevo shootings	National mourning on 5–7 May.
Bosnia and Herzegovina	1	5 May	Victims of the Belgrade school shooting and Mladenovac and Smederevo shootings	National mourning on 5 May.
Montenegro	1	7 May	Victims of the Belgrade school shooting and Mladenovac and Smederevo shootings	National mourning on 7 May
São Tomé and Príncipe	1	6 May	Death of Military general João Seria	
Democratic Republic of the Congo	1	8 May	Victims of the 2023 African Great Lakes floods	
Brazil	3	9–11 May	Death of Rita Lee	
Guyana	3	22–24 May	Victims of the 2023 Mahdia school fire	
Italy	1	24 May	Victims of the 2023 Emilia-Romagna floods	National mourning on 24 May.
Seychelles	1	9 June	Death of bishop French Chang-Him	
Kazakhstan	1	12 June	Victims of the 2023 Kazakhstan wildfires	National day of mourning on 12 June
Italy	1	14 June	Death of former Prime Minister Silvio Berlusconi	National mourning on 14 June, day of state funeral. Half mast flags for 3 days, from 12 to 14 June
Greece	3	14–16 June	Victims of the 2023 Pylos migrant boat disaster	National days of mourning on 14, 15 and 16 June
Pakistan	1	19 June	Victims of the 2023 Pylos migrant boat disaster	
Jamaica	1	23 June	Victims of child abuse	
Barbados	4	26–29 June	Death of former Prime Minister Lloyd Erskine Sandiford	National mourning on 26–28 June and in the day of State funeral.
Moldova	1	4 July	Victims of Chișinău International Airport shooting	4 July to be day of mourning.
Italy	1	10 July	Death of former prime minister Arnaldo Forlani	National mourning on 10 July.Half-mast flags between 8 and 10 July.
Saint Kitts and Nevis	1	20 July	Death of former governor general Tapley Seaton	
Puerto Rico	1	20 July	Death of Julio E. Vizcarrondo Ramírez de Arellano	
United Arab Emirates	3	27–29 July	Death of Saeed bin Zayed Al Nahyan	
Ecuador	3	9–11 August	Assassination of presidential candidate Fernando Villavicencio	
Ivory Coast	10	9–18 August	Death of former president Henri Konan Bédié	
Georgia	1	7 August	Victims of the 2023 Shovi landslide	
Bosnia and Herzegovina	1	16 August	Victims of the 2023 Gradačac massacre	16 August was the day of mourning.
Dominican Republic	1	17 August	Victims of the San Cristóbal explosion	17 August was the day of mourning.
Chile	2	24–25 August	Death of Belisario Velasco	
Chile	2	29–30 August	Death of Guillermo Teillier	
Sahrawi Arab Democratic Republic	3	2–4 September	Victims of the 2023 Tifariti drone strike	
Libya	3	13–15 September	Victims of Storm Daniel	
Bulgaria	1	8 September	Victims of Storm Daniel	
Mali	3	8–10 September	Victims of September 2023 Mali attacks	
Morocco	3	9–11 September	Victims of 2023 Marrakesh-Safi earthquake	
Egypt	3	13–15 September	Victims of 2023 Marrakesh-Safi earthquake and 2023 Libya floods	
Comoros	1	14 September	Victims of 2023 Marrakesh-Safi earthquake and 2023 Libya floods	
Nepal	1	14 September	Death of Subas Chandra Nemwang	
Moldova	1	16 September	Death of first President of Moldova Mircea Snegur	16 September was a day of national mourning. National flags lowered to half-mast.
Colombia	3	16–18 September	Death of Fernando Botero	
Argentina	2	22–23 September	Victims of an accident on San Martín de los Andes	
Italy	1	26 September	Death of former president of Italy Giorgio Napolitano	26 September, the day of the funeral, was declared a day of national mourning. State flags on government, local government and public buildings are lowered to half-mast. Parliament was closed for the day, and non-essential state business was halted.
Kosovo	1 3	25 September 25–27 September	Victims of the Banjska attack	25 September was a day of national mourning for death of Afrim Bunjaku. National flags lowered to half-mast. 26, 27, 28 September are days of mourning in Serb-majority areas. Serbian flag lowered to half-mast.
Republic of Srpska (Entity of Bosnia and Herzegovina)	1	27 September	Victims of the Banjska attack	September 27 was a day of national mourning.
Serbia	1	27 September	Victims of the Banjska attack	27 September was a day of national mourning.
Iraq	3	27–29 September	Victims of Qaraqosh wedding fire	
Moldova	1	2 October	Death of writer and poet Ion Druță	
Ghana	7	2–8 October	Death of former First Lady of Ghana Theresa Kufuor	
Niger	3	3–5 October	Victims of the Tabatol attack	
Peru	1	5 October	Death of former Vice President of Peru Luis Giampietri	
Syria	3	6-8 October	Victims of the 2023 Homs drone strike	
Nepal	1	10 October	Nepalese victims of the Gaza war	
Palestine	3	18–20 October	Victims of the Al-Ahli Arab Hospital explosion	National flags lowered to half-mast.
Arab League	3	18–20 October	Victims of the Al-Ahli Arab Hospital explosion	
Iraq	3	18–20 October	Victims of the Al-Ahli Arab Hospital explosion	
Jordan	3	18–20 October	Victims of the Al-Ahli Arab Hospital explosion	
Syria	3	18–20 October	Victims of the Al-Ahli Arab Hospital explosion	National flags lowered to half-mast.
Egypt	3	18–20 October	Victims of the Al-Ahli Arab Hospital explosion	
Turkey	3	19–21 October	Victims of the Al-Ahli Arab Hospital explosion	
Northern Cyprus	3	19–21 October	Victims of the Al-Ahli Arab Hospital explosion	
Mauritania	3	20–22 October	Victims of the Al-Ahli Arab Hospital explosion	
Lebanon	1	18 October	Victims of the Al-Ahli Arab Hospital explosion	All schools and universities were closed.
Iran	1	18 October	Victims of the Al-Ahli Arab Hospital explosion	
Bangladesh	1	19 October	Victims of the Al-Ahli Arab Hospital explosion	Also decreed for Palestinian victims of all other incidents of the Gaza war. National flags lowered to half-mast.
Zambia	1	25 October	Death of former Finance Minister Ng'andu Peter Magande	
Kazakhstan	1	29 October	Victims of Kostenko mine disaster	
Zambia	1	30 October	Death of former Speaker Amusaa Mwanamwambwa	
Puerto Rico	1	3 November	Death of former Secretary of Treasury Ángel Martín Taboas	
Israel	1	7 November	Victims of the October 7 attacks	Day of mourning held on 7 November, one month after the attack were held.
Andorra	2	7–8 November	Death of former prime minister Antoni Martí	National mourning on 7 and 8 November.
Namibia	2	9–10 November	Death of writer of national anthem Axali Doëseb	
Dominican Republic	3	20–22 November	Victims of the 2023 Dominican Republic floods	
Suriname	2	22–23 November	Victims of the 2023 Suriname mine disaster	
Republic of the Congo	1	22 November	Victims of the 2023 Brazzaville crowd crush	
Honduras	3	5–7 December	Victims of the December 2023 Honduras bus crash	
Liechtenstein	2	7–8 December	Death of Prince Constantin of Liechtenstein	Flags were at half mast marking one of the only 2 times mourning was declared in the country with the other declaration being in 2021
Kuwait	40	16 December 2023 – 25 January 2024	Death of Emir Nawaf Al-Ahmad Al-Jaber Al-Sabah	Kuwait declared a 3-day holiday and a period of mourning for 40 days, starting from 16 December.
Jordan	7	16–22 December	Death of Emir Nawaf Al-Ahmad Al-Jaber Al-Sabah	
Saudi Arabia	3	16–18 December	Death of Emir Nawaf Al-Ahmad Al-Jaber Al-Sabah	Despite national mourning being declared national flags were not put at half mast due to Saudi Arabian law
Egypt	3	16–18 December	Death of Emir Nawaf Al-Ahmad Al-Jaber Al-Sabah	All artistic activities and events across the country were suspended.
Oman	3	16–18 December	Death of Emir Nawaf Al-Ahmad Al-Jaber Al-Sabah	Public and private workplaces were closed during this time.
Qatar	3	16–18 December	Death of Emir Nawaf Al-Ahmad Al-Jaber Al-Sabah	National flag lowered to half-mast.
United Arab Emirates	3	16–18 December	Death of Emir Nawaf Al-Ahmad Al-Jaber Al-Sabah	National flag lowered to half-mast.
Bahrain	3	16–18 December	Death of Emir Nawaf Al-Ahmad Al-Jaber Al-Sabah	National flag lowered to half-mast.
Mauritania	3	16–18 December	Death of Emir Nawaf Al-Ahmad Al-Jaber Al-Sabah	
Lebanon	3	16–18 December	Death of Emir Nawaf Al-Ahmad Al-Jaber Al-Sabah	
Maldives	3	17–19 December	Death of Emir Nawaf Al-Ahmad Al-Jaber Al-Sabah	
Palestine	At least 1	16 December	Death of Emir Nawaf Al-Ahmad Al-Jaber Al-Sabah	
India	1	17 December	Death of Emir Nawaf Al-Ahmad Al-Jaber Al-Sabah	National flag lowered to half-mast and state entertainment programmes were cancelled.
Bangladesh	1	18 December	Death of Emir Nawaf Al-Ahmad Al-Jaber Al-Sabah	National flag lowered to half-mast. Special prayers for the late Emir were held in mosques, Hartal of Opposition Party BNP and other related parties postponed.
Pakistan	1	18 December	Death of Emir Nawaf Al-Ahmad Al-Jaber Al-Sabah	
Cuba	1	18 December	Death of Emir Nawaf Al-Ahmad Al-Jaber Al-Sabah	
Guinea	3	22–24 December	Victims of the Conakry oil depot explosion	
Czech Republic	1	23 December	Victims of the 2023 Prague shooting	23 December was a day of national mourning. State flags were lowered to half-mast throughout the country. Several other sports and cultural events were also called off.

== 2024 ==
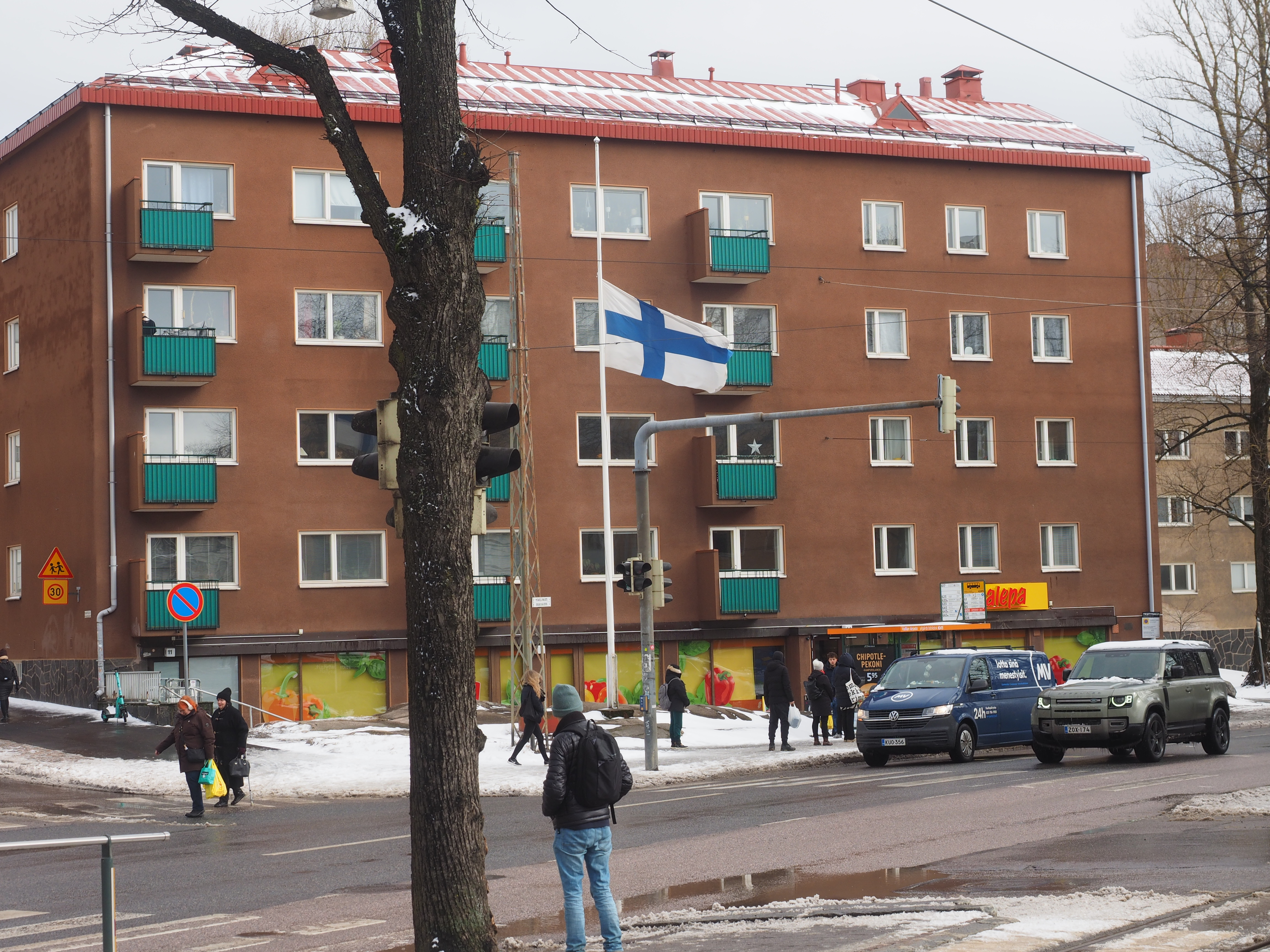
Finnish flag at half-mast in Helsinki following the Viertola school shooting, April 2024

Country	Number of Days	Calendar days	Reason	Notes
Dominican Republic	1	3 January	Death of ambassador Hans Dannenberg	Hans Dannenberg was the sitting Dominican Republic ambassador to Canada. He died on 23 December 2023. The declaration of mourning was postponed due to the Christmas and New Year's festivities.
Iran	1	4 January	Victims of Kerman bombings	A series of deadly bombs exploded at commemorative ceremony marking the assassination of Qasem Soleimani at his tomb in Kerman. Iran Government announced a day of national mourning on 4 January.
Brazil	3	6–8 January	Death of football legend Mário Zagallo	
Liberia	7	7–13 January	Victims of the 2023 Totota fire	On 26 December 2023, an explosion happened in the small rural town of Totota. The explosion caused a fire and killed over 50 people. The Liberian Government announced a week of mourning after the incident
Zambia	1	21 January	Death of Ronnie Shikapwasha	Mourning day initially set for 20 January
Portugal	1	31 January	Death of former European Commission President Jacques Delors	
Spain	1	31 January	Death of former European Commission President Jacques Delors	
Panama	1	2 February	Death of footballer Luis Tejada	
Iraq	3	4–6 February	Victims of the February 2024 United States airstrikes in Iraq and Syria	
Namibia	21	5–25 February	Death of President Hage Geingob	Mourning period to last from 5 to 25 February and decreed a state funeral for him at the Heroes' Acre in Windhoek on 25 February. Public and entertainment events canceled. 25 and 26 February were declared non-working days during the president's funeral, businesses, offices, schools and many shops closed on Monday.
Mozambique	5	21–25 February	Death of President Hage Geingob	
Zambia	2	24–25 February	Death of President Hage Geingob	
Cuba	2	5–6 February	Death of President Hage Geingob	Official mourning was in effect from 6:00 a.m. on 5 February until 12:00 midnight on 6 February 2024.
Maldives	2	6–7 February	Death of President Hage Geingob	Flags at half mast.
Chile	2	5–6 February	Victims of the 2024 Chile wildfires	In February 2024, a series of wildfires broke out in Chile, affecting multiple regions including Valparaíso, O'Higgins, Maule, Biobío, and Los Lagos. The most severe incidents occurred in the Valparaíso Region as of 5 February 2024. The Chilean government labeled the fires as the country's worst disaster since the 2010 Chile earthquake and declared a two-day national mourning period.
Chile	3	7–9 February	Death of former president Sebastián Piñera in a helicopter crash	Protocol indicated that a state funeral would be held with a three-day national mourning. The national flag was flown at half-mast at public spaces and military buildings.
Tanzania	5	10–14 February	Death of former Prime Minister Edward Lowassa	
Jordan	3	19–21 February	Death of Khaled Al Saif	
Sarawak (state of Malaysia)	2	22–23 February	Death of Abdul Taib Mahmud	
Tanzania	7	1–7 March	Death of former president Ali Hassan Mwinyi	
Dominican Republic	1	6 March	Death of businessman José León Asensio	
Bulgaria	2	15–16 March	Death of Patriarch Neophyte	
Niger	3	22–24 March	Victims of the 2024 Tillabéri attack	
Russia	1	24 March	Victims of the 2024 Crocus City Hall attack	Cultural and sports events canceled. Many shopping centers were closed.
Republika Srpska (Entity of Bosnia and Herzegovina)	1	24 March	Victims of the 2024 Crocus City Hall attack	
Abkhazia	1	24 March	Victims of the 2024 Crocus City Hall attack	
South Ossetia	1	24 March	Victims of the 2024 Crocus City Hall attack	Entertainment events were cancelled
Nicaragua	1	24 March	Victims of the 2024 Crocus City Hall attack	
Finland	1	3 April	Victims of the 2024 Viertola school shooting	
Mozambique	3	10–12 April	Sinking of the Zico	
Kosovo	1	17 April	In memory of all the women and girls killed in Kosovo as a result of gender equality violence.	
Kenya	3	19–21 April	Death of chief of defence forces Francis Ogolla	Died in a helicopter crash
Namibia	3	19–21 April	Death of war veteran Ida Jimmy	
Dominican Republic	1	20 April	Death of Franklin Almeyda	Former minister of the Interior (2004–2012) and former chancellor of the Autonomous University of Santo Domingo (1987–1990)
Central African Republic	3	22–24 April	Victims of the 2024 Bangui river disaster	
Chile	3	27–29 April	Killing of 3 Carabineros in Biobío Region	Flags at half mast
UAE	7	1–7 May	Death of Tahnoun bin Mohammed Al Nahyan	
Kenya	1	10 May	Victims of the 2024 Kenya–Tanzania floods	10 May was declared a public holiday to mark National tree growing day and to remember Kenyans who have died from the floods. It wasn't an official decree of mourning but a public holiday for commemoration.
Iran	5	20–24 May	Victims of the 2024 Varzaqan helicopter crash (Note: President of Iran Ebrahim Raisi and Minister of Foreign Affairs Hossein Amir-Abdollahian were among the victims.)	The Government of Iran announced five days of national mourning on 20 May. All sports competitions were suspended and Cultural Heritage Week events were postponed. Shops, schools and government offices were closed on 21 May. All government offices and private businesses in the country were closed on 22 May to coincide with the funerals for the crash victims.
Maldives	3	21–23 May	Victims of the 2024 Varzaqan helicopter crash	
Lebanon	3	20 May–22	Victims of the 2024 Varzaqan helicopter crash	Flags were lowered to half-mast in all government buildings, public offices and institutions, and radio and television station programming was changed and adapted to the situation.
Syria	3	20 May–22	Victims of the 2024 Varzaqan helicopter crash	Flags were lowered to half-mast in the Syrian Arab Republic and in all embassies and diplomatic missions abroad throughout this period.
Thailand	3	23–24 May and 27	Victims of the 2024 Varzaqan helicopter crash	
Cuba	2	21 May–22	Victims of the 2024 Varzaqan helicopter crash	Flags were lowered to half-mast on government and public buildings.
Tajikistan	2	21 May–22	Victims of the 2024 Varzaqan helicopter crash	1st time national mourning was observed in the country since 1989 and 1st as an independent country. Flags were lowered to half-mast on government and public buildings.
Bangladesh	1	23 May	Victims of the 2024 Varzaqan helicopter crash	The national flag was at half-mast in all government, semi-government and autonomous institutions and educational institutions, including all government and private buildings and Bangladesh missions abroad.
Pakistan	1	21 May	Victims of the 2024 Varzaqan helicopter crash	Prime Minister of Pakistan Shehbaz Sharif announced a day of national mourning on 20 May. Flags were lowered to half-mast on government and public buildings.
India	1	21 May	Victims of the 2024 Varzaqan helicopter crash	The national flag was flown at half-mast on all buildings where it is regularly flown across India and no official entertainment occurred during this time.
Iraq	1	21 May	Victims of the 2024 Varzaqan helicopter crash	Flags were lowered to half-mast on government and public buildings.
Turkey	1	21 May	Victims of the 2024 Varzaqan helicopter crash	Flags were lowered to half-mast on government and public buildings.
Sri Lanka	1	21 May	Victims of the 2024 Varzaqan helicopter crash	Flags were lowered to half-mast on government and public buildings.
Zambia	1	3 June	Death of Sketchley Sacika	
Malawi	21	11 June – 1 July	Victims of the 2024 Chikangawa Dornier 228 crash	Vice President Saulos Chilima and former First Lady Patricia Shanil Muluzi among the victims. Initially was only a day of mourning.
Moldova	1	24 June	Death of Author Spiridon Vangheli	
Niger	3	27–29 June	Victims of the June 2024 Niger attack	
Portugal	1	2 July	Death of artist Manuel Cargaleiro	
Albania	2	2–3 July	Death of novelist Ismail Kadare	
Kosovo	1	3 July	Death of novelist Ismail Kadare	
Ukraine	1	9 July	Victims of the 8 July 2024 Russian strikes on Ukraine	
Comoros	3	19–21 July	Victims of the 2024 Nice arson attack	
Cuba	3	20–22 July	Death of CPV General Secretary Nguyễn Phú Trọng	During the state mourning, flags on all government buildings, public buildings and military facilities were lowered to half-mast.
Laos	2	25 July–26	Death of CPV General Secretary Nguyễn Phú Trọng	Flags were lowered to half-mast and all entertainment events were suspended.
Vietnam	2	25 July–26	Death of CPV General Secretary Nguyễn Phú Trọng	National flag was lowered to half mast. All public entertainment events were suspended.
Ethiopia	3	27–29 July	Victims of the 2024 Gofa landslides	
Bangladesh	1	30 July	Victims of the 2024 Bangladesh quota reform movement	National flags fly at half-mast. Mourning denied and boycotted by the students and general public.
Iran	3	31 July–August 2	Assassination of Ismail Haniyeh	
Yemen	3	31 July–August 2	Assassination of Ismail Haniyeh	
Palestine	1	31 July	Assassination of Ismail Haniyeh	
Turkey	1	2 August	Assassination of Ismail Haniyeh	
Pakistan	1	2 August	Assassination of Ismail Haniyeh	
Brazil	3	9–11 August	Victims of Voepass Linhas Aéreas Flight 2283	
São Paulo (state of Brazil)	7	17–23 August	Death of media mogul Silvio Santos	
Brazil	3	17–19 August	Death of media mogul Silvio Santos	
Zambia	1	19 August	Death of former First Lady Maureen Mwanawasa	
Paraguay	3	20–22 August	Killing of deputy Lalo Gomes	
Lebanon	3	25–27 August	Death of former prime minister Salim al-Huss	
Portugal	1	31 August	Victims of the 2024 Portugal helicopter crash	
Philippines	1	4 September	Death of Federico Caballero	
Kenya	3	9–11 September	Victims of the 2024 Nyeri school fire	
El Salvador	3	9–11 September	Victims of the 2024 Pasaquina Bell UH-1 crash	
Libya	1	11 September	1 year anniversary of Storm Daniel	
Peru	3	12–14 September	Death of the former president Alberto Fujimori	
Micronesia	At least 1	18 September	Death of former president John Haglelgam	
Portugal	1	20 September	Victims of the 2024 Portugal wildfires	
Haiti	3	23–25 September	Victims of the 2024 Miragoane explosion	
Zambia	1	26 September	Death of former Defence Minister George Mpombo	
Iran	5	28 September – 2 October	Victims of the 2024 Hezbollah headquarters strike	
Lebanon	3	30 September – 2 October	Victims of the 2024 Hezbollah headquarters strike	Flags were lowered to half mast. Public offices were closed on the day of Nasrallah's funeral.
Iraq	3	29 September-October 1	Victims of the 2024 Hezbollah headquarters strike	
Syria	3	29 September-October 1	Victims of the 2024 Hezbollah headquarters strike	Flags were at half-mast. Last time national mourning was declared in the country by the Assad regime before its fall in December.
Yemen	3	29 September-October 1	Victims of the 2024 Hezbollah headquarters strike	National flags at half mast.
Dominican Republic	3	30 September – 2 October	Death of Ozzie Virgil Sr.	
Nepal	3	1–3 October	Victims of the 2024 Nepal floods	
Bosnia and Herzegovina	1	8 October	Victims of the 2024 Bosnia and Herzegovina floods	
Israel	1	27 October	Victims of the October 7 attacks	
Chad	3	29–31 October	Victims of the 2024 Barkaram attack	
Grenada	6	30 October – 4 November	Death of former governor general Daniel Williams	
Spain	3	31 October – 2 November	Victims of the 2024 Spanish floods	National flags were lowered to half mast. Many sporting and entertainment events were cancelled.
Serbia	1	2 November	Victims of Novi Sad railway station canopy collapse	Three days of mourning from 2nd to 4th November observed in Vojvodina.
Republic of Srpska (Entity of Bosnia and Herzegovina)	1	2 November	Victims of Novi Sad railway station canopy collapse	
Montenegro	1	3 November	Victims of Novi Sad railway station canopy collapse	
Philippines	1	4 November	Victims of Tropical Storm Trami	
Nigeria	7	5–11 November	Death of army chef Taoreed Lagbaja	Flags flew at half mast
Zambia	1	11 November	Death of John Phiri	
Chile	1	13 November	Death of Carolina Valdivia	
Tuvalu	1	14 November	Death of former prime minister Maatia Toafa	
Mozambique	3	20–22 November	Victims of the 2024–2025 Mozambican protests	Only opposition leader declared mourning
Somaliland	2	17–18 November	Death of former president Ahmed Mohamed Mohamoud	
Puerto Rico	2	20–21 November	Death of Manuel J. Fernós	
Chile	1	22 November	Death of deputy Mercedes Bulnes	
Guinea	3	3–5 December	Victims of the 2024 Nzérékoré stampede	
Comoros	7	16–22 December	Victims of Cyclone Chido	Many Comoran migrants were believed to have been killed in Mayotte
Mozambique	2	20–21 December	Victims of Cyclone Chido	
France	1	23 December	Victims of Cyclone Chido	National flag lowered to half-mast.
Croatia	1	21 December	Victims of Zagreb school stabbing	
Montenegro	1	23 December	Victims of Zagreb school stabbing	
Bangladesh	1	23 December	Death of civil aviation and tourism advisor A. F. Hassan Ariff	National flag lowered to half-mast. Special prayers arranged.
Rio Grande do Sul (state of Brazil)	3	25–27 December	Death of former governor Alceu Collares	
Azerbaijan	1	26 December	Victims of Azerbaijan Airlines Flight 8243	
India	7	26 December 2024 – 1 January 2025	Death of former prime minister Dr. Manmohan Singh	All government programs scheduled for 27 December were canceled. The national flag on all public buildings has been lowered. All entertainment and cultural events have been suspended.
Bhutan	1	27 December	Death of former prime minister Dr. Manmohan Singh	
Mauritius	1	28 December	Death of former prime minister Dr. Manmohan Singh	Half-mast flags.
South Korea	7	29 December 2024 – 5 January 2025	Victims of Jeju Air Flight 2216	Flags flew at half mast through the new year and many celebrations were cancelled
Syria	1	29 December	Victims of the Syrian civil war	First time national mourning was declared in the country after the fall of the Assad regime

== 2025 ==
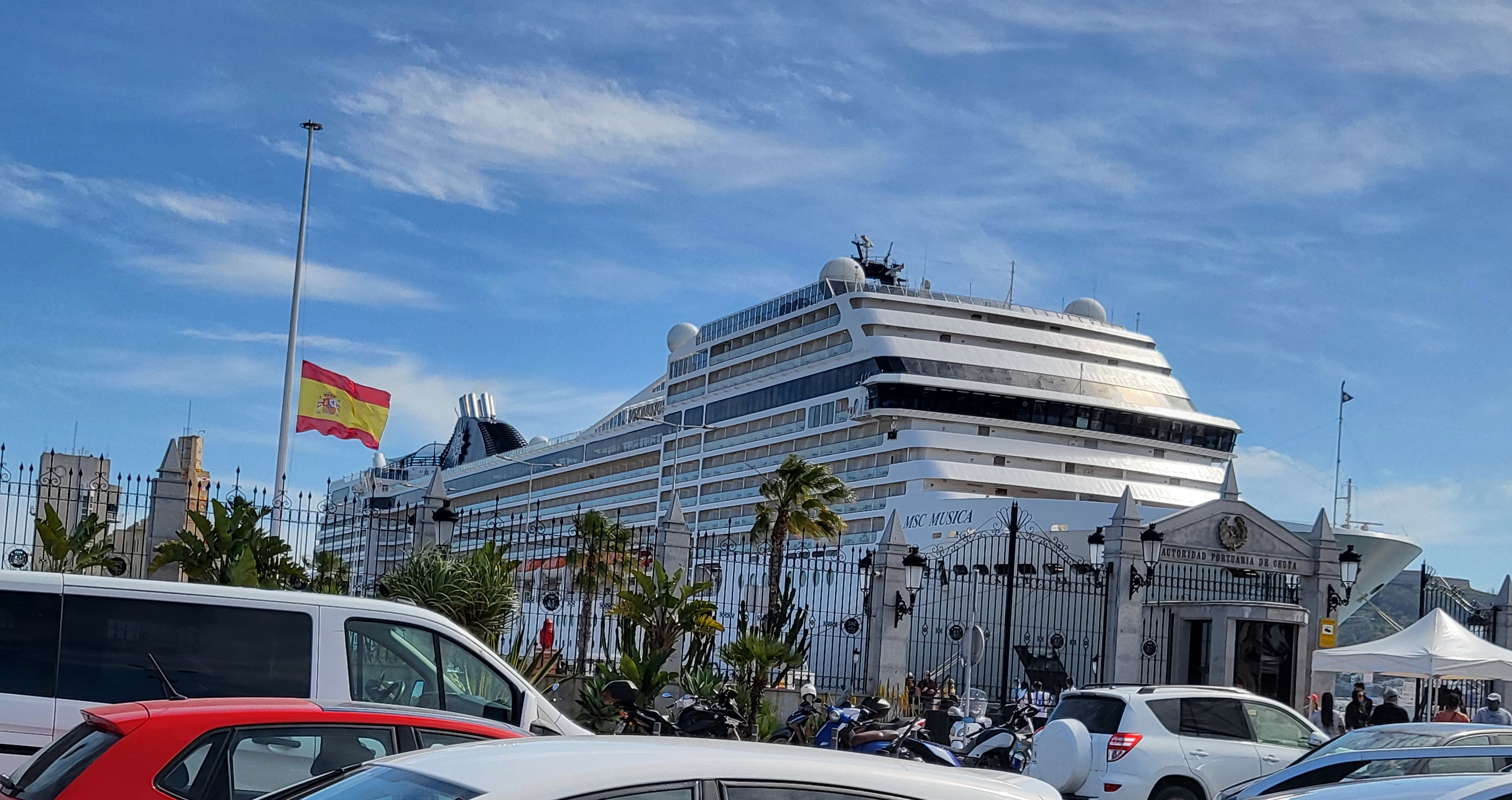
Spanish flag at half-mast in Ceuta, Spain following the death of Pope Francis, April 2025

Country	Number of Days	Calendar days	Reason	Notes
Montenegro	3	2–4 January	Victims of the 2025 Velestovo shootings	Flags were flown at half-mast. Concerts and public celebrations were cancelled.
Republic of Srpska (entity of Bosnia and Herzegovina)	1	3 January	Victims of the 2025 Velestovo shootings	Flags were flown at half-mast.
Serbia	1	5 January	Victims of the 2025 Velestovo shootings	Flags were flown at half-mast.
Ecuador	3	3–5 January	Murder of 4 Minors	National flags were at half mast.
Abkhazia	1	6 January	Victims of the 2025 Saberio fire	
Georgia	1	9 January	Victims of the 2025 Saberio fire	
Greece	4	6–9 January	Death of former prime minister Costas Simitis	
Dominican Republic	1	8 January	Death of Ángel Bissié Romero	
United States	1	9 January	Death of former president Jimmy Carter	U.S. flag to be flown at half staff for 30 days. Federal agencies and departments to be closed.
Estonia	1	11 January	Death of former president Arnold Rüütel	First time national mourning was observed in the country since 2013
Cuba	1	20 January	Victims of the 2025 Melones explosion	Victims were all Cuban troops
Serbia	1	22 January	Victims of the 2025 Barajevo nursing home fire	
Turkey	1	22 January	Victims of the 2025 Kartalkaya hotel fire	State flags on all government, local government and public buildings and in all embassies were lowered to half mast.
Northern Cyprus	1	22 January	Victims of the 2025 Kartalkaya hotel fire	
Monaco	1	23 January	Death of minister of state Didier Guillaume	First time mourning was declared in the country since 2011
Slovenia	1	24 January	Victims of the 2025 Velenje mining accident	First declaration of mourning in the country since 2008
Mongolia	1	24 January	Death of former president Punsalmaagiin Ochirbat	First declaration of mourning in the country since 2007
Papua New Guinea	7	31 January – 6 February	Death of former prime minister Julius Chan	Many celebrations were cancelled
Malta	1	8 February	Death of Mgr Victor Grech	
Pakistan	1	8 February	Death of Islamic figure Aga Khan IV	Flags were ordered to be at half mast
South Africa	7	8–14 February	South African victims of the 2025 Goma offensive	
Namibia	21	9 February – 1 March	Death of first President of Namibia Sam Nujoma	Flags have been lowered to half-mast as the country. Entertainment events canceled. Suspended sporting events
Cuba	3	10–12 February	Death of first President of Namibia Sam Nujoma	Official mourning on 10–11 February and national mourning on 12 February.
Mozambique	3	12–14 February	Death of first President of Namibia Sam Nujoma	
Guatemala	3	11–13 February	Victims of the 2025 Guatemala City bus crash	Flags at half mast.
Argentina	2	20–21 February	Murder of the Bibas brothers	
Moldova	1	28 February	Death of author and politician Vladimir Beşleagă	Flags flew at half mast and no mass entertainment events were held
Argentina	3	11–13 March	Victims of the 2025 Bahía Blanca floods	
North Macedonia	7	17–23 March	Victims of the Kočani nightclub fire	All flags were at half mast. Public events were cancelled in memory of the victims. Almost all radio stations switched to classical music or calm instrumental songs
Montenegro	1	17 March	Victims of the Kočani nightclub fire	Cancellation of public events, closure of leisure centers and certain tourist attractions (like museums but others like natural attractions or open landmarks remain open) is compulsory. Radio stations and public places are semi-required to switch to classical, calm instrumental music, or no music at all, but as this rule isn't generally enforced most radio stations played their regular playlists
Serbia	1	18 March	Victims of the Kočani nightclub fire	Cancellation of public and entertainment events as well as closing of many tourist attractions (like museums as these are considered entertainment venues, but tourist attractions like natural tourist attractions or open historical monuments like non-museums areas within the Belgrade Fortress remain open) is mandatory on national days of mourning regardless if the mourning periods brings serious or little grief to the general population. Also regardless of the levels of grief is that radio stations and public places (like stores) on days of mourning are semi-required to play classical, calm instrumental music or no music at all. As this rule isn't generally enforced, several radio stations played the regular playlist.
Bosnia and Herzegovina	1	18 March	Victims of the Kočani nightclub fire	Day of mourning declared in both entities. Public events cancelled while sporting events limited. Cancellation of public and entertainment events as well as closing of many tourist attractions (like museums as these are considered entertainment venues, but tourist attractions like natural tourist attractions or open historical monuments like Mostar Bridge remain open) is mandatory on national days of mourning regardless if the mourning periods bring serious or little grief to the general population. Also regardless of the levels of grief is that radio stations and public places (like stores) on days of mourning are semi-required to play classical, calm instrumental music or no music at all. As this rule isn't generally enforced many radio stations played their regular playlists. In Replublika Srpska many switched to classical music, calm instrumental music, or ballads (many also stuck with the regular playlists) while in the Federation of Bosnia and Herzegovina most radio stations stuck with the regular playlists but many changed their playlists just like in Replublika Srpska and certain neighbouring countries.
Bulgaria	1	18 March	Victims of the Kočani nightclub fire	Flags flew at half mast. Unlike in the neighbouring countries that declared days of mourning there was no change in radio stations playlists
Malta	1	22 March	Death of Archbishop of Malta Paul Cremona	
Niger	3	23–25 March	Victims of the 2025 Fambita mosque attack	
Chile	1	27 March	Death of singer Tommy Rey	
Puerto Rico	1	28 March	Death of Cirilo Tirado Delgado	
Myanmar	7	31 March – 6 April	Victims of the 2025 Myanmar earthquake	Flags lowered to half-mast. First time national mourning was observed in the country since 2008
Laos	5	3–7 April	Death of former president Khamtai Siphandone	All parties and sporting activities were prohibited
Vietnam	2	4–5 April	Death of former president Khamtai Siphandone	Public entertainment and celebratory events were suspended.
Cuba	2	5–6 April	Death of former president Khamtai Siphandone	Flags were put at half mast.
Lithuania	1	5 April	Killing of four American troops operating in the country	
Ukraine	1	6 April	Victims of the 4 April Russian attacks on Kryvyi Rih	Flags were set at half mast. Three days of mourning was observed in Kryvyi Rih.
Dominican Republic	6	8–13 April	Victims of the Jet Set nightclub roof collapse	Initially a three-day period was declared but was later extended to six days.
Zambia	1	11 April	Death of former Minister of Finance Edith Nawakwi	All activities of entertainment nature on both radio and television were suspended, while flags flew at half-mast.
Peru	1	14 April	Death of Nobel Prize laureate Mario Vargas Llosa	
Ukraine	1	14 April	Victims of the 2025 Sumy airstrike	
Micronesia	4	14–17 April	Death of Francisco L. Loanis	First time mourning was declared in the country since 2009
Philippines	1	22–26 April	Death of singer and actress Nora Aunor	Declared on the exact day of funeral.
Philippines	4	22–26 April	Death of Pope Francis	Already on half-mast due to Aunor's funeral, flags remained at half-mast in the country until Pope Francis' funeral on Saturday, 26 April.
Holy See	9	26 April – 4 May	Death of Pope Francis	
Argentina	7	21–27 April	Death of Pope Francis	National flags on all government and public buildings were lowered to half-mast. Initially 3 days of mourning. Argentina's football association postponed all fixtures on Monday. Many cultural events and theater performances have been canceled. Classes were canceled in all Catholic schools.
Brazil	7	21–27 April	Death of Pope Francis	National flags at half mast. The Christ the Redeemer statue in Rio De Janeiro was lit up in memory of the pope.
East Timor	7	22–28 April	Death of Pope Francis	
Puerto Rico	6	21–26 April	Death of Pope Francis	Initially 3 days of mourning
Paraguay	5	22 April–26	Death of Pope Francis	
Italy	5	22 April–26	Death of Pope Francis	Flags at half mast. All Serie A and Primavera matches scheduled to take place on Easter Monday have been officially postponed for a period of mourning following the death of Pope Francis. All public events scheduled for 21 and 22 April in Rome have been canceled following the death of Pope Francis. All sporting events on the day of the Pope's funeral have been canceled. Schools closed on Saturday in Rome for the funeral of Pope Francis.
São Tomé and Príncipe	5	22 April–26	Death of Pope Francis	Flags at half mast. Suspension of all public holiday and recreational events, effective Tuesday, 22 April 2025.
Costa Rica	4	21–24 April	Death of Pope Francis	Flags were at half mast.
Seychelles	4	22–24 April and 26	Death of Pope Francis	Flags at half-mast.
Spain	3	22–24 April	Death of Pope Francis	National flags on all government and public buildings were lowered to half-mast. Sporting and other events preceded by a minute of silence.
Lebanon	3	22–24 April	Death of Pope Francis	Flags will be flown at half-mast on all government buildings, public institutions, and municipalities, Radio and television stations have been asked to adjust their programming to reflect the solemn occasion.
Palestine	3	22–24 April	Death of Pope Francis	National flags on government and public buildings are lowered to half-mast.
Chile	3	22–24 April	Death of Pope Francis	Flags at half mast
Cuba	3	22–24 April	Death of Pope Francis	National flags lowered to half-mast on all government, public and local government buildings.
Dominican Republic	3	22–24 April	Death of Pope Francis	
Peru	3	22–24 April	Death of Pope Francis	National flags on government and public buildings are lowered to half-mast.
Panama	3	22–24 April	Death of Pope Francis	
Guatemala	3	22–24 April	Death of Pope Francis	
Venezuela	3	22–24 April	Death of Pope Francis	National flags lowered to half-mast on all government, public and local government buildings. Festivities and public celebrations will be suspended.
Ecuador	3	22–24 April	Death of Pope Francis	
Jordan	3	22–24 April	Death of Pope Francis	
India	3	22–23 April and 26	Death of Pope Francis	National flag in India was flown at half-mast on all government, municipal and public buildings where the national flag is regularly flown, and entertainment was suspended. Catholic schools were closed on the day of the funeral.
Equatorial Guinea	3	23 April–25	Death of Pope Francis	
Thailand	3	23 April–25	Death of Pope Francis	Flags at half mast.
Portugal	3	24 April–26	Death of Pope Francis	Flags at half mast.
Monaco	3	24 April–26	Death of Pope Francis	Flags on all public buildings were flown at half-mast from Monday, 21 April, until Saturday, 26 April, the day of the Pope's funeral. Buildings were not illuminated for three days of mourning. Minute of silence, at 11:00 a.m. on Friday, 25 April, sirens sounded in the Principality, calling on all residents and tourists to honor the deceased Pope with a minute of silence.
Belize	3	24 April–26	Death of Pope Francis	
Mozambique	3	24 April–26	Death of Pope Francis	
Bangladesh	3	24 April–26	Death of Pope Francis	National flag is flown at half-mast in all government, semi-government, autonomous and educational institutions and in all government and private buildings throughout the country and in Bangladesh's diplomatic missions abroad.
Gabon	3	25–27 April	Death of Pope Francis	Flags at half mast.
Malta	2	22 and 26 April	Death of Pope Francis	National flags were lowered to half-mast on all government and public buildings. All official events by the Government of Malta were cancelled or postponed. All football matches of Malta's Premier League postponed.
Cape Verde	2	23–24 April	Death of Pope Francis	Flags at half mast.
South Sudan	1	25 April	Death of Pope Francis	The national government of South Sudan declared Friday, 25 April 2025, as a National Public Holiday to mourn His Holiness Pope Francis who died on Easter Monday.
Uruguay	1	26 April	Death of Pope Francis	National flags were lowered to half-mast on all government and public buildings.
Hungary	1	26 April	Death of Pope Francis	National flags were lowered to half-mast on all government and public buildings. Television and radio stations canceled entertainment programs on the day of the pope's funeral.
Poland	1	26 April	Death of Pope Francis	National flags were lowered to half-mast on all government and public buildings. Some television and radio stations adapted more serious or slightly more serious entertainment programs on the day of the pope's funeral (by some radio stations playing a mix of mid tempo songs and ballads, or some radio stations playing just ballads. TV channels often showed more serious/slightly more serious movies or shows) while many TV channels and radio stations also stuck with their totally regular programing. Some events were canceled and most other sports and cultural events were preceded by a minute of silence.
Romania	1	26 April	Death of Pope Francis	Flags at half mast. At the same time, radio and television stations and cultural organizations adapted their programs to the day of national mourning, preceding it with a minute of silence or restrictions on entertainment programs.
Croatia	1	26 April	Death of Pope Francis	Flags at half mast. On the Day of Mourning, entertainment events are suspended from 7:00 a.m. to 7:00 p.m. Due radio and entertainment content rules, most radio stations played only ballads or mix of mid-tempo songs with ballads while a large minority kept playing totally regular playlists.
Bosnia and Herzegovina	1	26 April	Death of Pope Francis	Flags at half mast. Cancellation of public and entertainment events as well as closing of many tourist attractions (like museums as these are considered entertainment venues, but tourist attractions like natural tourist attractions or open historical monuments like Mostar Bridge remain open) is mandatory on national days of mourning regardless if the mourning periods bring serious or little grief to the general population. Also regardless of the levels of grief is that radio stations and public places (like stores) on days of mourning are semi-required to play classical, calm instrumental music or no music at all. As this rule is not generally enforced, a large minority of radio stations played their regular playlists.
Lithuania	1	26 April	Death of Pope Francis	Flags at half mast.
Slovakia	1	26 April	Death of Pope Francis	Flags at half mast. Gambling has been prohibited in the Slovak Republic on the national day of mourning.
Slovenia	1	26 April	Death of Pope Francis	Flags at half mast. Sporting and other events preceded by a minute of silence.
Sri Lanka	1	26 April	Death of Pope Francis	Flags at half mast.
Albania	1	26 April	Death of Pope Francis	Flags at half mast. All public and private radio and television stations have restricted entertainment programs and broadcast programs commemorating the Pope.
Zambia	1	26 April	Death of Pope Francis	National flags at half mast.
Central African Republic	1	26 April	Death of Pope Francis	National flags at half mast.
Iran	1	28 April	Victims of the Port of Shahid Rajaee explosion	
Tanzania	7	7–13 May	Death of former prime minister Cleopa Msuya	
Suriname	2	10–11 May	Death of former president Jules Wijdenbosch	Flags were at half mast and the launch of the Royalty for Everyone programme was postponed for the 14th.
Ecuador	3	10–12 May	11 Soldiers killed in an ambush	
Zambia	1	13 May	Death of Rodger Chongwe	
Uruguay	3	14–16 May	Death of former president José Mujica	Flags were at half mast with the state funeral happening from 14–15 May in Montevideo before he was cremated and interred at his farmhouse on the cities outskirts.
Brazil	3	15–17 May	Death of former president José Mujica	
Cuba	1	16 May	Death of former president José Mujica	
Ecuador	2	22–23 May	Death of former president Alfredo Palacio	
Vietnam	2	24 May–25	Death of former president Trần Đức Lương	Public entertainment and celebratory events were suspended.
Cuba	2	24 May–25	Death of former president Trần Đức Lương	During the period of official mourning, Cuba's national flags were lowered to half-mast in government buildings, public buildings and military installations throughout the country.
Micronesia	4	29 May – 1 June	Death of governor of Yap State Charles Chieng	
Suriname	1	4 June	Victims of the 2025 Albina boat disaster	
Moldova	1	5 June	Death of composer Eugen Doga	Day of mourning on day of funeral.
Zambia	~~16~~ 12	~~8–23 June~~ 8–19 June	Death of former president Edgar Lungu	Initially 7 days of mourning but was extended by 9 days after the president was not buried during the initial mourning period. Flags at half mast and all entertainment events suspended. On 19 June 2025, President Hakainde Hichilema formally ended the national mourning period, citing the ongoing impasse over the repatriation of Edgar Lungu's remains. In his address, he noted that despite reaching an agreement on 15 June, the family's abrupt refusal to proceed on 18 June necessitated the conclusion of the official mourning to allow the nation to return to normalcy.
Mozambique	3	13–15 June	Death of former president Edgar Lungu	
Austria	3	11–13 June	Victims of the 2025 Graz school shooting	Flags at half-mast on government and public buildings. On Wednesday, 11 June, at 10:00 a.m., a minute of silence, and church bells were tolled across the country in memory of the shooting victims. Public transport stopped for a minute of silence. State Television and radio stations also paused their programmes for a minute of silence. All concerts, theatre performances and opera are cancelled in Graz. In all of Austria, some events have also been cancelled, while other public and sports performances and events will begin with a minute of silence.
South Africa	1	19 June	Victims of the 2025 South Africa floods	
Syria	3	23–25 June	Victims of the Mar Elias Church attack	Flags at half mast.
Liberia	4	24–27 June	Funeral of former president Samuel Doe	Died in 1990. Flags at half mast.
Central African Republic	3	27–29 June	Victims of the 2025 Bangui school stampede	A nearby explosion at an electricity transformer caused a stampede at a high school in Bangui where around 6000 students from five different schools where taking the baccalaureate exam. 29 were killed and another 280 were injured.
Iran	1	28 June	Victims of the Twelve-Day War	
South Africa	6	7–12 July	Death of former deputy president David Mabuza	Flags at half mast.
Nigeria	7	13–19 July	Death of former president Muhammadu Buhari	Flags at half mast and national events have been postponed.
Bangladesh	1	16 July	Anniversary of July Martyrs' Day	Flags at half mast.
Dominican Republic	1	16 July	Death of Fello Suberví	Flags at half mast at all military enclosures and public buildings.
Iraq	3	17–19 July	Victims of the 2025 Kut shopping mall fire	
Dominica	1	19 July	Death of Thomas P. Etienne	All state flags on public buildings will be flown at half mast.
Bangladesh	1	22 July	Victims of the 2025 Dhaka fighter jet crash	A day mourning was declared nationwide by the government of Bangladesh.
Montenegro	1	28 July	Victims of various tragedies throughout the country	
Maldives	3	29–31 July	Death of Ambassador and former Minister of tourism Hassan Sobir	Flags at half mast.
Ukraine	1	1 August	Victims of the 2025 Russian attacks on Kyiv	
Zambia	1	5 August	Death of Ackson Sejani	All flags are at half-mast on government and public buildings. All entertainment activities on television and radio have been restricted.
Chile	3	3–5 August	Victims of a mine collapse in El Teniente	Flags at half mast.
Romania	1	7 August	Death of former president Ion Iliescu	Day of state funeral is the day of national mourning. Flags at half mast. Radio and TV broadcast will adapt their programs to the solemnity during the day of the funeral.
Ghana	3	7–9 August	Victims of the 2025 Ghanaian Air Force Z-9 helicopter crash	Defence minister Edward Omane Boamah was among the victims. Flags are at half mast and all activities suspended.
Myanmar	5	7–11 August	Death of former acting President Myint Swe	Initially 3 days of mourning. Flags at half mast.
Colombia	1	12 August	Assassination of senator Miguel Uribe Turbay	Flags at half mast.
Cape Verde	2	12–13 August	Victims of Tropical Storm Erin	
Montenegro	1	14 August	Death of junior sergeant Dejan Božović	Died while trying to extinguish wildfires.
Liberia	16	15–30 August	Death of Minister of State for Presidential affairs Sylvester Grigsby	Flags at half mast.
Algeria	1	16 August	Victims of the 2025 Algiers bus crash	Flags at half mast on 15–16 August.
Marshall Islands	7	28 August – 3 September	Death of former president Christopher Loeak	Flags at half mast.
Brazil	3	30 August – 1 September	Death of Luis Fernando Verissimo	
Albania	1	2 September	Death of Dhimitër Anagnosti	Flags at half mast.
Brazil	3	2–4 September	Death of Mino Carta	
Portugal	1 (national); 3 (City of Lisbon)	4 September (national); 4–6 September (City of Lisbon)	Victims of the Ascensor da Glória derailment	The incident caused 15 deaths and 18 injuries, as of 3 September. The government decreed in-advance a one-day national mourning due to the crash. The flags should be flown at half mast. The Mayor of Lisbon decreed an additional 2 days of local mourning (3 in total).
Saint Kitts and Nevis	7	8–14 September	Death of former Governor General Edmund Wickham Lawrence	Flags at half mast.
Nepal	1	17 September	Victims of the 2025 Nepalese Gen Z protests	17 September was declared a day of national mourning and a public holiday. National flags were flown at half-mast. All government offices and public offices, as well as educational institutions and many businesses were closed on that day.
Micronesia	At least 2	17–18 September	Death of former president Joseph Urusemal	Flags at half mast.
Dominican Republic	1	26 September	Death of Guillermo Caram	
Puerto Rico	1	26 September	Death of Carlos Pagán	
Bahamas	5	30 September – 4 October	Death of Vaughn Miller	Flags at half mast.
Italy	2	14 and 17 October	Victims of the 2025 Castel d'Azzano explosion	
Kenya	7	15–21 October	Death of former prime minister Raila Odinga	Flags at half mast.
Zambia	1	17 October	Death of former cabinet minister Rodger Sakuhuka	
Puerto Rico	1	17 October	Death of Sandy Alomar Sr.	
Chile	1	17 October	Death of Sergio Hidalgo	
Dominican Republic	1	18 October	Death of Vicente Sánchez Baret	
Portugal	2	22–23 October	Death of former prime minister Francisco Pinto Balsemão	Flags at half mast.
Ghana	3	24–26 October	Death of former First Lady Nana Konadu Agyeman Rawlings	Flags at half mast.
Thailand	90	25 October 2025 – 23 January 2026	Death of former Queen Sirikit	Flags flew at half-mast for a month in all government offices, state-owned enterprises, public institutions, schools, military and diplomatic facilities. Concert organizers are asked to cooperate and adapt appropriately to the prevailing conditions in order to ensure the appropriate tone for the events. A year mourning for Royal Family and government officials.
Chile	1	28 October	Death of Héctor Noguera	Flags at half mast.
Serbia	1	1 November	1 year anniversary of the Novi Sad railway station canopy collapse	Flags at half mast.
Republic of Srpska	1	1 November	1 year anniversary of the Novi Sad railway station canopy collapse	Flags at half mast.
Albania	1	2 November	Death of former Prime Minister Fatos Nano	All state and public institutions lowered the national flag to half-mast. Also at 12:00 all activities were suspended and a minute of silence was observed throughout Albania. All football matches postponed
Haiti	3	3–5 November	Victims of Hurricane Melissa	
Dominican Republic	1	4 November	Death of Marcelo Bermúdez Estrella	
Bosnia and Herzegovina	1	6 November	Victims of the 2025 Tuzla retirement home fire	
Montenegro	1	6 November	Victims of the 2025 Tuzla retirement home fire	
Suriname	1	12 November	Death of former president Ronald Venetiaan	
Moldova	1	20 November	Death of Ilie Ilașcu	
Hong Kong	3	29 November – 1 December	Victims of the 2025 Tai Po apartment complex fire	For three days, all public buildings and government facilities in Hong Kong flew national flags and the flag of the Hong Kong Special Administrative Region at half-mast. Many sporting and entertainment events have been postponed.
Chile	1	12 December	Death of Gonzalo Diaz Cuevas	
Mozambique	7	12–18 December	Death of Feliciano Gundana	During the mourning period, the national flag and presidential banner will be flown at half mast across the entire country and at diplomatic missions abroad.
Puerto Rico	2	14–15 December	Death of Rafael Ithier	
Ecuador	3	19–21 December	Death of Former president Rodrigo Borja Cevallos	
Bangladesh	1	20 December	Killing of Youth leader Osman Hadi	
Angola	1	22 December	Death of former prime minister Fernando da Piedade Dias dos Santos	Flags at half mast.
Libya	3	24–26 December	Victims of Harmony Jets Flight 185	Army general Mohammed Ali Ahmed al-Haddad was among the killed.
Guatemala	3	28–30 December	Victims of the 2025 Sololá bus crash	
Bangladesh	3	31 December 2025 – 2 January 2026	Death of Former Prime Minister Khaleda Zia	National flag will be flown at half-mast in all government, semi-government, autonomous and educational institutions and in all government and private buildings throughout the country and in Bangladesh's diplomatic missions abroad from 31 December 2025 to 2 January 2026. Sporting and entertainment events suspended. The government has issued a gazette declaring Wednesday (31 December) a general holiday. On this day, all public and private offices were closed.

== 2026 ==
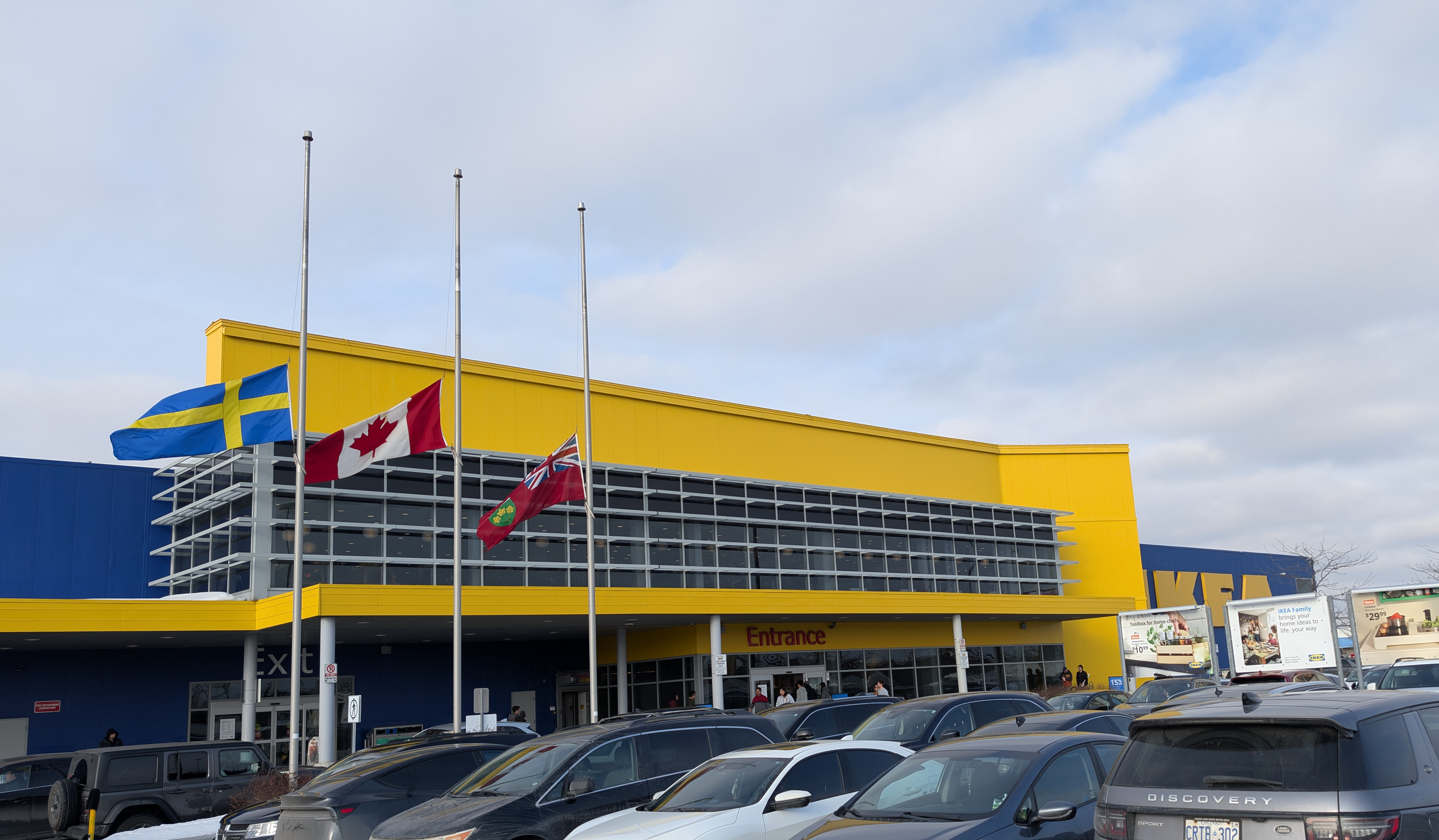
Flags of Sweden, Canada and Ontario at half-mast at IKEA in Etobicoke, Ontario following the Tumbler Ridge shooting in February 2026

Country	Number of Days	Calendar days	Reason	Notes
Suriname	1	2 January	Victims of the 2025 Richelieu stabbing	
Switzerland	6	2–6 and 9 January	Victims of the 2026 Crans-Montana bar fire	Flags have been lowered to half-mast on public buildings across the country. Public events preceded by a minute of silence or restricted.
Sahrawi Arab Democratic Republic	3	2–4 January	Death of Mustafá Mohamed Ali Sid Bachir	
Venezuela	7	7–13 January	Victims of the 2026 United States strikes in Venezuela	National flags flew at half-mast on government and public buildings.
Cuba	2	5–6 January	Victims of the 2026 United States strikes in Venezuela	During the national mourning period, the Cuban flag was lowered to half-mast on government and public buildings, and all public events and celebrations were suspended.
Iran	3	12–14 January	Deaths during the 2025–2026 Iranian protests	Only for security offciers, police, and army personnel.
Cyprus	4	14–17 January	Death and funeral of former president George Vassiliou	Flags at half-mast across all public institutions across the country.
Yemen	3	19–21 January	Death of Former Vice President and Founder of Southern Movement Ali Salem Al-Beidh	Flags at half-mast for 3 days.
Guatemala	3	20–22 January	Victims of nationwide prison riots	
Spain	3	20–22 January	Victims of the 2026 Adamuz train derailments	
Australia	1	22 January	Victims of the Bondi beach shooting	
Chile	2	22–23 January	Victims of the 2026 Biobío wildfires	
Mozambique	2	23–24 January	Death of former prime minister Luísa Diogo	
India	3	28–30 January	Victims of the 2026 Baramati Learjet 45 crash	State mourning in Maharashtra only. Flags at half-mast, public holiday declared.
Dominican Republic	1	1 February	Death of Ramón Alburquerque	
Canada	1	12 February	Victims of the 2026 Tumbler Ridge shooting	Only observed in the province of British Columbia. Flags at half mast across the country for 7 days.
Zambia	1	16 February	Death of Matiya Ngalande	
Puerto Rico	2	17–18 February	Death of Félix A. Santoni	
Zambia	1	19 February	Death of Mutumba Mainga	
Republic of Congo	1	23 February	Death of Minister of State Firmin Ayessa	
Bolivia	3	1–3 March	Victims of the 2026 Bolivian Air Force Lockheed C-130 crash	
Iran	40	1 March – 9 April	Death of Supreme Leader Ali Khamenei	Flags at half-mast on government, military and public buildings. Television and radio stations changed their programming to include programs commemorating and honoring Khamenei. A seven-day national holiday was also declared, and all government offices, schools, and the Tehran Stock Exchange were closed.
Iraq	3	2–4 March	Death of Supreme Leader Ali Khamenei	
Indonesia	3	March 2-4	Death of former Vice President Try Sutrisno	
Portugal	1	7 March	Death of António Lobo Antunes	
Ethiopia	3	14–16 March	Victims of landslides in the Gamo Zone	
Georgia	5	18–22 March	Death of patriarch Ilia II	
Chile	3	20–22 March	Murder of Javier Figueroa Manquemilla	
Micronesia	3	20–22 March	Death of Former Speaker Nelson Pelep	
Colombia	3	25–27 March	Victims of the 2026 Colombian Air Force Lockheed C-130 crash	
Algeria	3	28–30 March	Death of former president Liamine Zéroual	
Suriname	2	6–7 April	Death of former president Chan Santokhi	
Lebanon	1	9 April	Victims of the 8 April 2026 Israeli attacks on Lebanon	Government offices, public institutions, and municipalities will be closed, flags will be flown at half-mast, and radio and television programming will be adjusted to mark the day of mourning.
Haiti	3	14–16 April	Victims of the Citadelle Laferrière crowd crush	
Moldova	1	15 April	Death of Gheorghe Urschi	Day of funeral will be the day of national mourning.
Brazil	3	April 18–20	Death of Oscar Schmidt	
Kosovo	1	24 April	Death of Rexhep Qosja	
Mali	2	27–28 April	Death of Minister of Defence Sadio Camara	
Chad	3	May 7–9	Victims of an attack in the Lake Chad region	
Dominica	1	May 8	Death of Ian Pinard	
Puerto Rico	3	May 8–10	Death of José Ortiz	Initially only a day of mourning.
Botswana	8	May 9–16	Death of former president Festus Mogae	Initially 3 days of mourning.
Colombia	2	May 12–13	Deaths of former Vice President Germán Vargas Lleras and journalist Mateo Perez Rueda	
São Tomé and Príncipe	3	May 17–19	Death of poet Conceição Lima	
Angola	1	May 22	Victims of the Angolan Civil War	
Colombia	3	May 24–26	Death of singer Totó la Momposina	
Yemen	3	May 29–31	Death of former President Abdrabbuh Mansour Hadi	
San Marino	1	June 1	Death of Mariella Mularoni	
Iraq	3	June 5–7	Death of Grand Ayatollah Muhammad al-Fayadh	
Sahrawi Arab Democratic Republic	3	June 7–9	Killing of Lehbib Mohamed Abdelaziz and two other people	
Zambia	1	June 9	Death of Paramount Chief Mpezeni	
Saint Lucia	11	June 9–19	Death of former governor-general Neville Cenac	
Thailand	15	June 12–26	Death of Princess Bajrakitiyabha	
East Timor	7	June 22–28	Death of Former President Francisco Guterres	Flags at half mast.
Cuba	1	June 23	Death of former Vice President Ramiro Valdés Menéndez	
Venezuela	7	July 1–7	Victims of the 2026 Venezuela earthquakes	
Portugal	1	July 5	Victims of the 2026 Venezuela earthquakes	
Saint Kitts and Nevis	3	July 7–9	Death of Hugh Heyliger	
Iran	1	July 9	State funeral of Ali Khamenei	
Chile	3	July 10–12	Death of Enrique Krauss	
Qatar	4	July 12-15	Death of Father Emir and former Emir Hamad bin Khalifa Al Thani	Work was suspended at all ministries, government agencies, and public institutions from Monday, July 13, 2026, with workers resuming work on Sunday, July 19, 2026. Flags were flown at half-mast throughout the state during the mourning period.
Kuwait	4	July 12-15	Death of Father Emir and former Emir Hamad bin Khalifa Al Thani	
Bahrain	4	July 12-15	Death of Father Emir and former Emir Hamad bin Khalifa Al Thani	
UAE	4	July 12-15	Death of Father Emir and former Emir Hamad bin Khalifa Al Thani	
Jordan	4	July 12-15	Death of Father Emir and former Emir Hamad bin Khalifa Al Thani	
Lebanon	4	July 12-15	Death of Father Emir and former Emir Hamad bin Khalifa Al Thani	State flags on all buildings of government departments, public institutions and municipalities were lowered to half-mast. Radio and television stations have changed their programming to a more subdued one.
Palestine	3	July 13-15	Death of Father Emir and former Emir Hamad bin Khalifa Al Thani	
Somalia	3	July 13-15	Death of Father Emir and former Emir Hamad bin Khalifa Al Thani	
Cuba	2	July 13–14	Death of Father Emir and former Emir Hamad bin Khalifa Al Thani	
Sudan	1	July 13	Death of Father Emir and former Emir Hamad bin Khalifa Al Thani	
India	1	July 13	Death of Father Emir and former Emir Hamad bin Khalifa Al Thani	
Pakistan	1	July 13	Death of Father Emir and former Emir Hamad bin Khalifa Al Thani	
Maldives	1	July 13	Death of Father Emir and former Emir Hamad bin Khalifa Al Thani	Flags at half-mast for 24h starting at noon.
Nepal	1	July 14	Death of Father Emir and former Emir Hamad bin Khalifa Al Thani	
Bangladesh	1	July 15	Death of Father Emir and former Emir Hamad bin Khalifa Al Thani	
Zambia	5	July 16–20	Death of former Acting President and Vice President Guy Scott	
Barbados	2	July 17 and 29	Death of Garfield Sobers	Additional day declared on day of internment.
Chile	3	July 18–20	Death of a Carabinero	
Guyana	3	July 22–24	Victims of the sinking of the MV Barima	
Zambia	1	July 22	Death of Alina Nyikosa	
Brazil	3	July 23–25	Death of Luiz Carlos Barreto	
Madagascar	1	July 24	Victims of kidnappings	
Algeria	3	July 31-August 2	Victims of a bus crash in El Kerma	
Zambia	1	August 4	Death of Namani Monze	
Zambia	1	August 6	Death of Ivan Zyuulu	
Zambia	1	August 7	Death of Joseph Katema	
Laos	5	August 9-13	Death of National Assembly President Xaysomphone Phomvihane	Flags at half-mast.
Vietnam	2	August 10-11	Death of National Assembly President Xaysomphone Phomvihane	Flags at half-mast. Public entertainment and recreational activities suspended.
Zambia	1	August 11	Death of Austin Liato	
Colombia	3	August 12-14	Victims of the 2026 Colombia earthquake	National flags flown at half-mast on government and public buildings. Cultural and entertainment events as well as all sports competitions and matches have been suspended.
Brazil	3	August 18-20	Death of Laura Cardoso and Glória Menezes	
Ecuador	3	August 20-22	Death of Michele Sensi-Contugi	Died in a helicopter crash on Mount Ololokwe in Kenya.
Sri Lanka	3	August 21-23	Death of singer Nanda Malini	
Puerto Rico	1	August 27	Death of Dolly Parton	
Uruguay	1	August 27	Death of Rubén Rada	
Algeria	3	August 27-29	Victims of wildfires	
Norway	13	August 28-September 9	Death of Norwegian King Harald V	National flags were lowered to half-mast at royal residences, government, military and public buildings. All Saturday matches at the highest level of Norwegian football are postponed. Norwegian Public Television and other stations have changed some of their schedules, eliminating entertainment programs. No prohibitions on cultural events were issued in the aftermath of his death, and some concerts and festivals scheduled for that weekend proceeded mostly as planned.
Jordan	3	August 28-30	Death of Norwegian King Harald V	
Estonia	1	August 29	Death of former Prime Minister Siim Kallas	
Northern Cyprus	3	August 31-September 2	Victims of the Sinking of the Filo Jet	
Montenegro	2	September 1-2	Victims of a mass shooting in Danilovgrad	
Chile	2	September 6-7	Death of Camilo Escalona	
Cape Verde	2	September 6-7	Victims of the Cape Verde bus crash	
Nepal	1	September 7	Victims of the 2026 Nepal floods	
Palau	12	September 7-18	Death of Andres Uherbelau, Ignacio Anastacio, and Ucherbelau Lorenzo Edward	
Bolivia	3	September 9-11	Victims of explosions at a military base in Viacha	
Uganda	3	September 11-13	Death of King Rukidi IV of Tooro	
Philippines	1	September 12	Death of historian Resil B. Mojares	
Solomon Islands	8	September 19-26	Death of Nathaniel Waena	
Zambia	1	September 21	Death of Peter Dingiswayo	
Kazakhstan	1	September 25	Death of servicemens in Mangystau Region	
Vanuatu	1	September 27	Victims of the Sinking of the MV Matui	
DR Congo	3	September 28-30	Victims of the 2026 Kenge Let L-410 crash	
Chile	3	September 28-30	Murder of a police officer	
Chile	3	October 5-7	Killing of Jaime Urrea	
Nigeria	3	October 6-8	Victims of the 2026 Nigerian Air Force ATR 42 crash	
Ukraine	1	October 8	Victims of attacks in Pryluky	
Puerto Rico	3	October 14-16	Death of Wilfredo Gómez	
Jordan	3	October 23-25	Victims of the 2026 Karak church shooting	
South Sudan	18	October 27-November 13	Death of former president Joseph Lagu	Flags at half mast until the day of burial.
Puerto Rico	1	October 29	Death of former senator Eudaldo Báez Galib	
Spain	3	October 29-31	Victims of the 2026 Toledo train collision	
Croatia	1	November 3	Death of Mišo Kovač	Day of National Condolences declared. Flags will be at half-mast but entertainment programs will not postpone, like in a day of national mourning.
Uruguay	2	November 3-4	Death of three military soldiers	
Uruguay	2	November 5-6	Death of Gonzalo Morantino	
Chile	2	November 7-8	Death of Sebastián Lelio	
Poland	2	November 8-9	Victims of the 2026 Kraków shooting	National flags on government, local government, and public buildings were flown at half-mast. Sporting and cultural events were preceded by a minute of silence and some were postponed. Television stations limited entertainment programming. Five days of mourning were declared in Kraków lasting from November 7-11.
Bulgaria	1	November 11	Victims of the 2026 Trakia motorway crash	
Iran	1	November 18	Death of Hossein Wahid Khorasani	
Puerto Rico	1	November 19	Death of Oreste Ramos	
Georgia	1	November 22	Victims of an explosion in Ponichala	

== See also ==
- List of national days of mourning (before 2000)
- List of national days of mourning (2000–2019)
- National day of mourning
- International day of mourning, a similar concept at the international level
- European Day of Mourning, a similar concept at the EU level
- Arab League Day of Mourning, a similar concept at the Arab League level
