= 2023 Totota fire =

Explosion that happened in Liberia

- Date: December 26, 2023
- Location: Totota, Bong County, Liberia
- Cause: truck crash
- Deaths: 89
- Injuries: 40

On December 26, 2023, a fuel truck crashed and exploded while people were collecting spilled fuel in the rural town of Totota, Liberia around 130 km away from the capital Monrovia. The explosion started a fire, which killed over 70 people.

== Background ==
According to UN Figures poor road safety and weak infrastructure made Sub-Saharan Africa including Liberia the world's deadliest region for crashes.

== Accident ==
On December 26, 2023, the fuel tanker was involved in an accident on the road which caused is to veer off the road and toppled over on its side. People nearby went to collect the spilt fuel but in the process the tanker exploded and started a massive fire. In total, over 70 people were killed and many were injured

== Reactions ==
President George Weah sent sympathy for the people of Totota and declared a week of mourning

Neighbouring Sierra Leone sent medical workers to the area to help the wounded
