= Manawa Peter Gatkuoth =

South Sudanese politician (died 2022)

Personal details
- Died: 19 June 2022; Cairo, Egypt

Manawa Peter Gatkuoth (died 19 June 2022) was a South Sudanese politician. He was Minister of Water Resources from March 2020 until his death in 2022.

== Personal life ==
He hailed from the Lou Nuer community in Akobo County of Jonglei State

== Death ==
A three-day national mourning period was declared.
