= Karou and Ouatagouna massacres =

Terrorist incident in Mali

- Part of Mali War
- Location: Karou, Ouattagouna, Daoutegeft, and Dirga, Mali
- Date: August 8, 2021
- Deaths: 51+
- Perpetrator: Islamic State in the Greater Sahara

On August 8, 2021, jihadist militants from Islamic State in the Greater Sahara (ISGS) launched simultaneous attacks on four villages in central Mali, killing over fifty-one civilians.

== Attack ==
Around 6pm local time, over 80 ISGS militants stormed the four towns of Karou, Ouattagouna, Daouetegeft, and Dirga, all within a short distance of each other. The militants fired guns while riding on motorbikes, "as most victims were in front of their houses; others going to the mosque" according to local official Oumar Cisse. According to eyewitnesses, ISGS went from house to house, rounding up all of the men and children, only sparing some women. Military officials stated that ISGS fighters massacred everyone, burning down homes and stealing cattle. Many of the dead were women and children.

Malian military officials stated the attack was prompted because locals in the town had shared the locations of ISGS to the Malian military following recent humanitarian aid deliveries.

== Aftermath ==
The provisional death toll, according to local officials, was 51 killed. Twenty civilians were killed in Karou, fourteen in Ouattagouna, and an unknown amount in Daoutegeft and Dirga. A representative of local Songhai human rights group Songhoy Chaawara Batoo claimed that the attack occurred within eighteen kilometers of a Malian military base. Malian officials claimed that after the attacks, they established a heavy security presence in the area. The UN also launched its own investigation into the massacre in late 2021.
