= 2024 Nice arson attack =

2024 arson attack in Nice, France

Nice arson attack
- Location: Les Moulins, Nice, France
- Date: 18 July 2024 c. ~2:30 p.m. (CEST)
- Attack type: Arson, Mass murder, Familicide
- Weapon: Petrol
- Deaths: 7 (including one indirectly)
- Injuries: 33
- Perpetrator: Unknown
- Motive: Unknown

On July 18, 2024, seven people were killed and thirty-three others were injured in an arson attack in Nice, France.

== Fire ==
The fire started after unknown men ignited petrol that was poured in a stairwell at around 2:30 p.m. on the seventh floor of an apartment building in Les Moulins, Nice. The fire quickly spread, killing six people from the same family including three young children and three adults, while a teenager died jumping from a window. Thirty people suffered smoke inhalation injuries while three other injured people, including a man who jumped from a window trying to escape the fire and was severely injured, were taken to hospital. A total of 25 fire engines and 72 firefighters were sent to tackle the blaze.

== Aftermath ==
One suspect was arrested on July 22, 2024, by French police.

== Victims ==
The seven victims consisted of three young children ages five, seven, ten, three adults and a 17-year-old who died indirectly by jumping out a window trying to escape the fire.

== Responses ==
The French police stated they were searching for three suspects.

French president Emmanuel Macron stated that his thoughts were with the loved ones of those who died.

Anthony Borre, Nice's deputy mayor, said "These actions are serious, they are barbaric,..." adding that he hoped for a strong response by the authorities once the investigation was over.

Nice prosecutor Damien Martinelli said investigators were looking into a criminal cause for the fire.

French Prime Minister Gabriel Attal stated “What happened here, this fire, is absolutely awful and revolting,...”.
