= Hillside Endarasha school fire =

School fire in Kenya

2024 Nyeri school fire
- Date: 5 September 2024
- Time: 2AM local time (11PM UK time)
- Location: Belle Vue, Nyeri County, Kenya
- Deaths: 21

Early in the morning of 5 September 2024, a fire broke out in a dormitory of Hillside Endarasha Academy, a school in Belle Vue, Nyeri County, Kenya, killing 21 students.

== Reactions ==
Following the fire, reports emerged of the dormitory having been overcrowded, and the National Gender and Equality Commission called for an inquiry into the circumstances surrounding the fire. A number of Kenyan boarding schools had had fire incidents in the years prior to the Nyeri fire, the most serious one killing 67 students in a dormitory in 2021, and Education cabinet secretary Julius Ogamba released a statement saying that regulations concerning fire safety needed to be reviewed.

President William Ruto declared 3 days of mourning and ordered an investigation into the fire. In Vatican City Pope Francis sent condolences to the victims' families.

== Aftermath ==
The government announced that Hillside Endarasha Academy would reopen on 9 October, less than 5 weeks after the fire, but on 12 October, a court order forced the school to close its boarding facilities again, due to concerns for the safety and health of the students. During a court hearing in December, the owners stated that the school would reopen as a day school.
