= Totota =

Town in Bong County, Liberia

- Location in Liberia
- Coordinates: 6°49′N 9°55′W
- Country: Liberia
- County: Bong County

A baby African elephant, probably Loxodonta cyclotis. Tubman Zoo, Totota, Bong County, 1977–1978.

Totota is a small town in Bong County, Liberia, with a population between 5,000 and 8,000 depending on the season. The main paved road from Monrovia to Gbarnga passes through Totota, keeping Totota alive with activity day and night. Totota has several high schools, notably E.J. Yancy, Upper Room, Sandary, and Lutheran. Totota has two health clinics, Helping Hands and "Small Phebe" in addition to a myriad of churches, shops, orphanages, and day cares, among other services. Wednesday is market day in Totota.

President William V. S. Tubman, who served for 27 years, established his presidential rubber farming retreat in a Totota, with the rubber farms of Lafayette Morgan, former economic adviser to the President, and Richard Henries, the longest serving Speaker of the House of Representatives of Liberia, located adjacent to it. Jimmy Barolle, longtime butler to President Tubman has a 400-acre (162 ha) rubber farm nearby and Mrs. Antoinette Tubman, wife of the former president, has her own large oil palm estate near the town. There is a hotel and restaurant resort with an attached zoo, Coocoo's Nest, named for their daughter, Wilhelmina "CooCoo" Tubman.

== 2023 explosion ==
On Boxing Day 2023, A fuel tank exploded and caught fire in the city while people were collecting spilled fuel killing over 50 people injuring 40 others and prompting the Liberian government to decree a weeklong mourning period across the country.
