= 2022 Tessit attack =

Battle of the Mali War

Tessit attack
- Part of the Mali War
Date	7 August 2022
Location	Tessit, Ménaka Region, Mali
Result	Islamic State victory

Belligerents
Mali	Islamic State in the Greater Sahara

Casualties and losses
42 killed 22 wounded	37 killed (Mali claim)
- 4 civilians killed

In August 2022, an attack by suspected Islamists killed 42 Malian soldiers and injured 22 more. The attack was one of the deadliest attacks in recent years during the Mali War.

== Background ==
In 2012, Tuareg rebels launched a rebellion against the Malian government. After some initial success, hardline Islamist groups such as AQIM and ISWAP hijacked the rebellion and began an insurgency against the Malian government. Some of the worst affected regions throughout the war have been the southern provinces of Gao and Mopti. In early March 2022, rebels attacked Malian soldiers stationed in the area of Mondoro, killing 33 Malian soldiers and injuring 33 more.

== Attack ==
On August 7, around 3pm local time, alleged ISGS fighters launched an attack on Malian soldiers near Tessit with "drones, explosives, car bombs, and artillery" The Malian government released a statement claiming to have killed 37 fighters during the ensuring battle. Two of the civilians killed during the fighting were elected officials.
