= 2022 Kinshasa floods =

2022 flood in Kinshasa, Democratic Republic of Congo

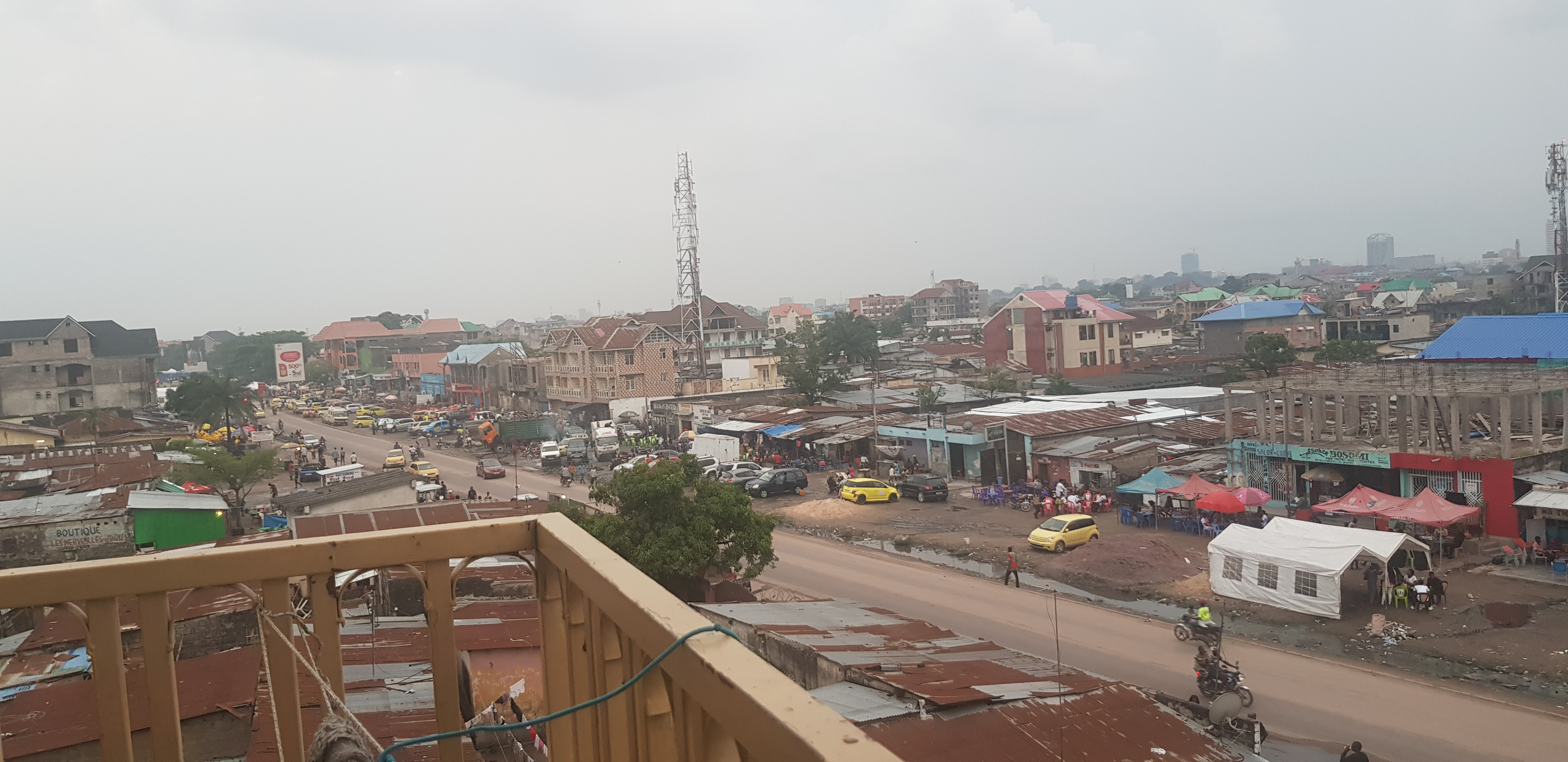
- Kinshasa City
- Date: 12-13 December 2022
- Location: Kinshasa, Democratic Republic of the Congo
- Cause: Heavy rains
- Deaths: 169
- Injuries: "dozens"

From 12 to 13 December 2022, heavy rains left roads, infrastructure and many neighborhoods underwater or destroyed in Kinshasa, the Democratic Republic of the Congo's capital.

== Impact ==
Many roads in Kinshasa's city center were submerged as heavy rains continued for hours and many homes collapsed. At least 169 people were killed by flooding. Many of the deaths were caused by landslides caused by heavy rains. At least 280 homes had collapsed and over 38,000 others were affected by flooding. Twelve million people, consisting of most of the city's population have been affected by flooding.

== Aftermath ==
The Government of the Democratic Republic of the Congo had announced a three-day period of national mourning.
