= List of people who have received a state funeral =

This is a list of people who have received a state funeral.

== Africa ==
=== Algeria ===
- Ahmed Ben Bella (2012)
- Abdelaziz Bouteflika (2021)

=== Angola ===
- Agostino Neto (1979)
- José Eduardo dos Santos (2022)

=== Botswana ===
- Sir Seretse Khama (1980)
- Ruth Williams Khama (2002)
- Gladys Olebile Masire (2014)
- Sir Ketumile Masire (2017)
- Festus Mogae (2026)

=== Burundi ===
- Melchior Ndadaye (1993)
- Cyprien Ntaryamira (1994)
- Pierre Nkurunziza (2020)
- Pierre Buyoya (2020)

=== Cameroon ===
- Marc-Vivien Foe (2003)

=== Central African Republic ===
- David Dacko (2003)
- Ange-Félix Patassé (2011)
- André Kolingba (2010)

=== Chad ===
- Idriss Déby (2021)

=== Democratic Republic of the Congo ===
- Laurent-Desire Kabila (2001)

=== Republic of the Congo ===
- Marien Ngouabi (1977)

=== Egypt ===
- Syed Hossain (1949)
- Gamal Abdel Nasser (1 October 1970)
- Mohammad Reza Pahlavi (30 July 1980), Shah of Iran who died in exile in Egypt
- Anwar Sadat (8 October 1981)
- Hosni Mubarak (26 February 2020)

=== Ethiopia ===
- Meles Zenawi (2012)
- Sylvia Pankhurst (1960)
- Tilahun Gessesse (2009)

=== Gabon ===
- Edith Lucie Bongo (2009)
- Omar Bongo (2009)

=== Ghana ===
- George Kingsley Acquah (2007)
- Abdul Wahab Adam (2014)
- Ebenezer Ako-Adjei (2002)
- Francis Allotey (2017)
- Kwesi Amissah-Arthur (2018)
- Kofi Annan (2018)
- Vincent Cyril Richard Arthur Charles Crabbe (2018)
- W. E. B. Du Bois (1963)
- Emmanuel Evans-Anfom (2021)
- Mary Grant (2016)
- Aliu Mahama (2012)
- Joseph Henry Mensah (2018)
- John Atta Mills (2012)
- J. H. Kwabena Nketia (2019)
- Kwame Nkrumah (1972)
- Paul Victor Obeng (2014)
- William Ofori Atta (1988)
- Atukwei Okai (2018)
- Victor Owusu (2000)
- Nathan Quao (2005)
- Emmanuel Charles Quist (1959)
- Jerry Rawlings (2020)

=== Ivory Coast ===
- Hamed Bakayoko (2021)

=== Kenya ===
- Mzee Jomo Kenyatta (1978)
- Lucy Kibaki (2016)
- Wangari Maathai (2011)
- Wahome Gakuru (2017)
- Joyce Laboso (2019)
- Daniel arap Moi (2020)
- Mwai Kibaki (2022)
- Raila Odinga (2025)

=== Liberia ===
- Joseph Jenkins Roberts (1876)
- William Tubman (1971)
- Prince Johnson (2024)

=== Malawi ===
- Kamuzu Banda (1997)
- Ethel Mutharika (2007)
- Bingu wa Mutharika (2012)
- Saulos Chilima (2024)

=== Mali ===
- Moussa Traoré (2020)
- Amadou Toumani Touré (2020)

=== Morocco ===
- Soldiers killed in the 1971 Moroccan coup attempt

=== Mozambique ===
- Samora Machel (1986)
- Afonso Dhlakama (2018)
- Luísa Diogo (2026)

=== Namibia ===
- Andimba Toivo ya Toivo (2017)
- Theo-Ben Gurirab (2018)
- Nickey Iyambo (2019)
- Hage Geingob (2024)
- Sam Nujoma (2025)

=== Sierra Leone ===
- Ahmad Tejan Kabbah (2014)

=== Somalia ===
- Hassan Abshir Farah (2020)
- Nur Hassan Hussein (2020)

=== South Africa ===
- George Bizos (2020)
- Mangosuthu Buthelezi (2023)
- Collins Chabane (2015)
- Eddie Daniels (2017)
- Chris Hani (1993)
- Tshenuwani Farisani (2025)
- Nkosi Johnson (2001)
- Pius Langa (2013)
- Mosiuoa Lekota (2026)
- Nelson Mandela (2013)
- Winnie Mandela (2018)
- Isaac Lesiba Maphotho (2019)
- Richard Maponya (2020)
- Ivy Matsepe-Casaburri (2009)
- Epainette Mbeki (2014)
- Govan Mbeki (2001)
- Senzo Meyiwa (2014)
- Raymond Mhlaba (2005)
- Andrew Mlangeni (2020)
- Joe Modise (2001)
- Fikile Mokgohloa (2026)
- Edna Molewa (2018)
- Ruth Mompati (2015)
- Elias Motsoaledi (1994)
- Jackson Mthembu (2021)
- Beyers Naudé (2004)
- John Nkadimeng (2020)
- Alfred Nzo (2000)
- Vejaynand Ramlakan (2020)
- King Maxhoba Sandile (2011)
- Queen Noloyiso Sandile (2020)
- Gertrude Shope (2025)
- Joseph Shabalala (2020)
- King Xolilizwe Sigcawu (2005)
- King Zwelonke Sigcawu (2019)
- King Zanozuko Sigcau (2022)
- Albertina Sisulu (2011)
- Walter Sisulu (2003)
- Thembile Skweyiya (2015)
- Zola Skweyiya (2018)
- Makhenkesi Stofile (2016)
- Zolani Tete (2026)
- Steve Tshwete (2002)
- King Victor Thulare III (2021)
- Desmond Tutu (2021)
- Marais Viljoen (2007)
- Joost van der Westhuizen (2017)
- Chester Williams (2019)
- King Goodwill Zwelithini (2021)

=== South Sudan ===
- Gordon Muortat Mayen (2008)
- John Garang (2005)

=== Tanzania ===
- Benjamin Mkapa (2020)
- John Magufuli (2021)
- Ali Hassan Mwinyi (2024)
- Julius Nyerere (1999)

=== Togo ===
- Gnassingbé Eyadéma (2005)

=== Tunisia ===
- Beji Caid Essebsi (2019)

=== Uganda ===
- Godfrey Binaisa (2010)
- Mutesa II of Buganda (1969)
- Milton Obote (2005)
- Jacob Oulanyah (2022)

=== Zambia ===
- Levy Mwanawasa (2008)
- Frederick Chiluba (2011)
- Betty Kaunda (2013)
- Michael Sata (2014)
- Kenneth Kaunda (2021)
- Rupiah Banda (2022)
- Guy Scott (2026)

=== Zimbabwe ===
- Joshua Nkomo (1999)
- Simon Muzenda (2003)
- Joseph Msika (2009)
- John Nkomo (2013)
- Oliver Mtukudzi (2019)
- Robert Mugabe (2019)
- Wicknell Chivayo (2026)

== Americas ==
=== Argentina ===
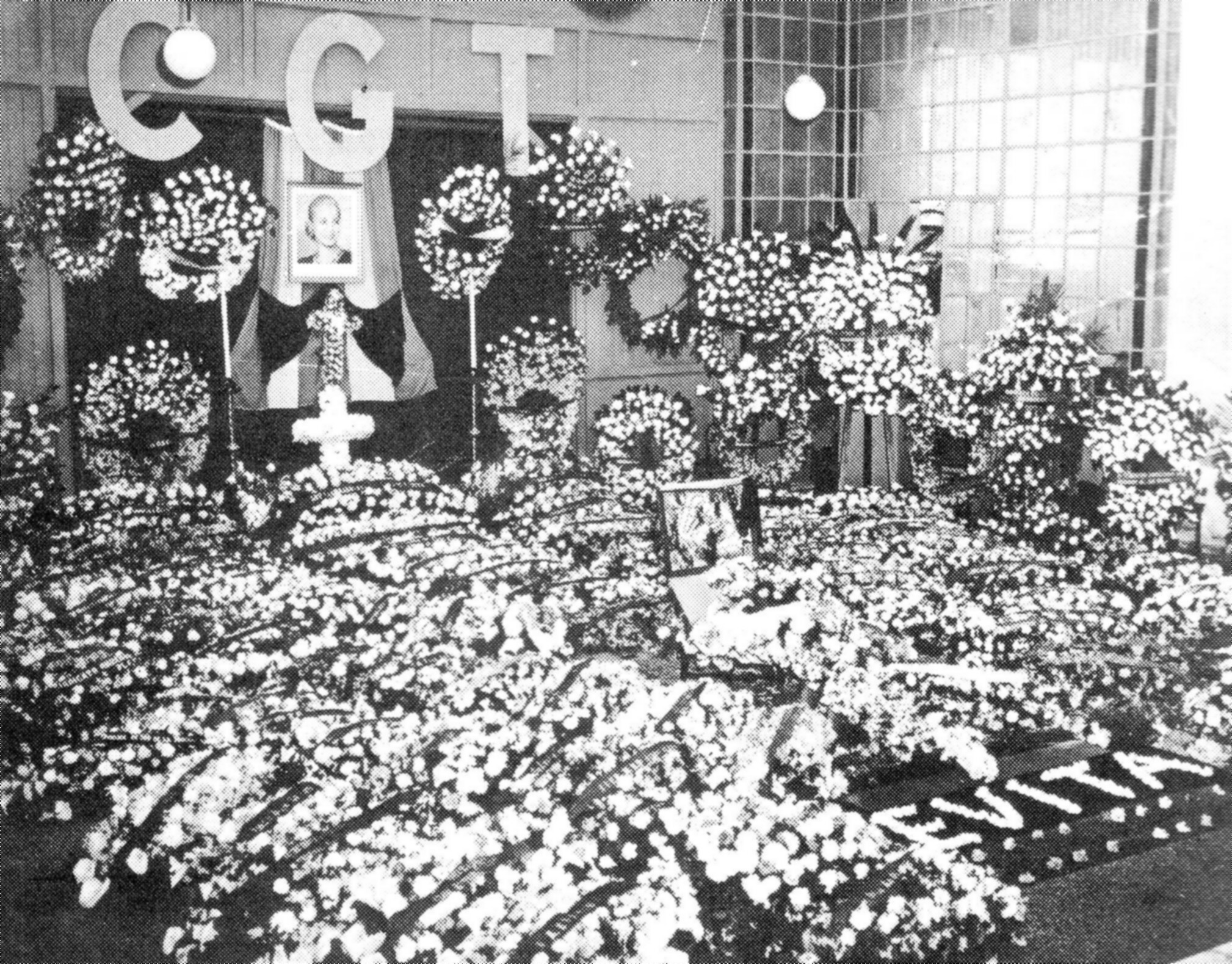
Almost three million people attended Eva Perón's funeral in the streets of Buenos Aires.

- Eva Perón (1952), first lady
- Raúl Alfonsín (2009), former president
- Néstor Kirchner (2010), former president
- Diego Maradona (2020), football legend

=== The Bahamas ===
- Sir Lynden Pindling, (4 September 2000), former prime minister, in Nassau
- Sir Clifford Darling (5 January 2012), former governor-general, in Nassau

=== Barbados ===
- Grantley Adams, former Barbados Premier and West Indies Federation Prime Minister (1971)
- Tom Adams, former Barbados Prime Minister (1985)
- Errol Barrow, former Barbados Prime Minister (1987)
- Harold Bernard St. John, former Barbados Prime Minister (2004)
- David Thompson, former Barbados Prime Minister (2010)
- Owen Arthur, former Barbados Prime Minister (2020)
- Lloyd Erskine Sandiford, former Barbados Prime Minister (2023)

=== Brazil ===
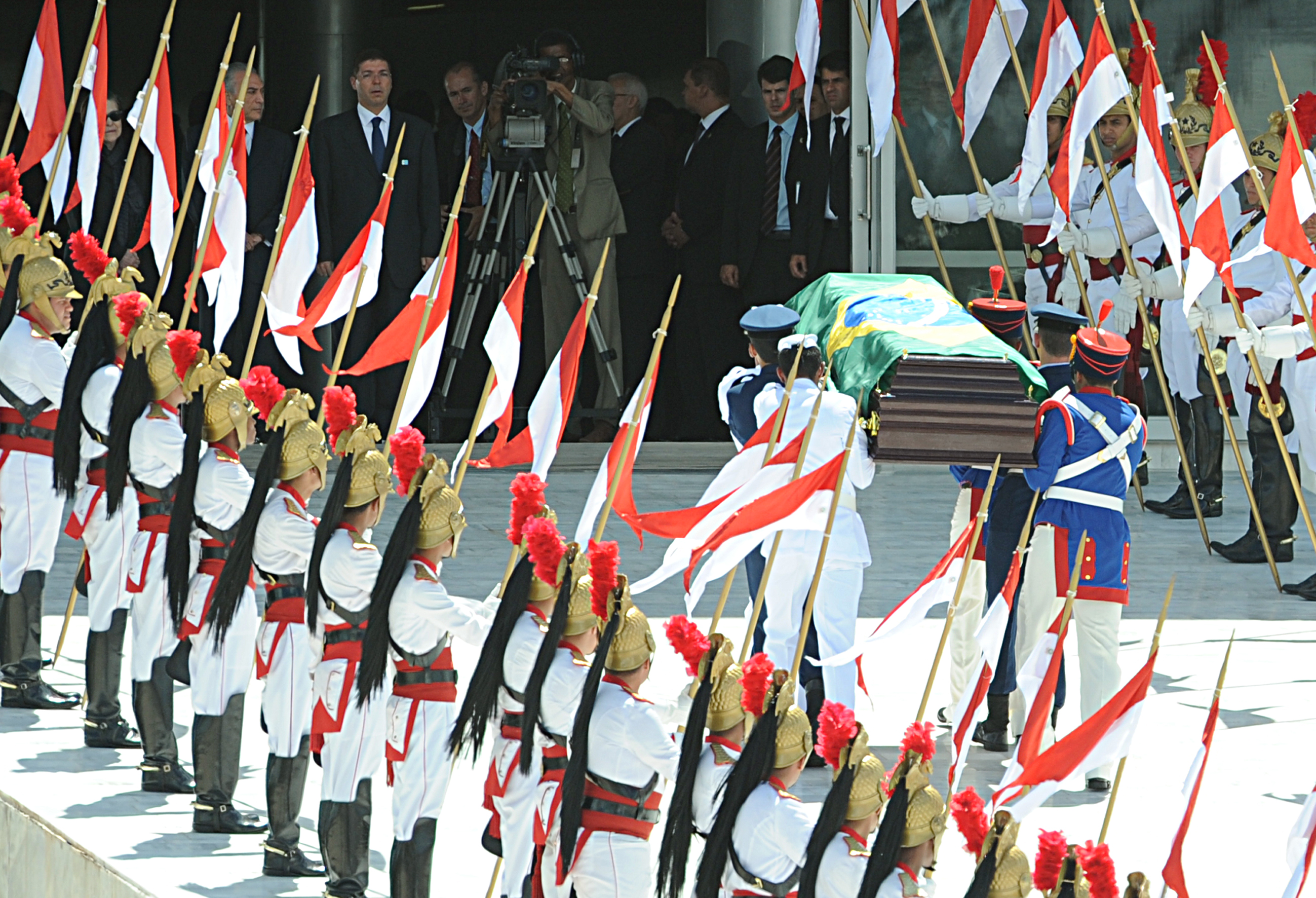
A guard of honour during the state funeral of the former Vice President of Brazil, José Alencar, at the Palácio do Planalto in Brasília, 30 March 2011

- Maria I, (Note: Following the Napoleonic invasion of Portugal in 1807, Queen Maria I and her court fled to the colony of Brazil. In 1815, Brazil was elevated to a kingdom in union with Portugal, with Maria I reigning as monarch of the newly formed kingdom until her death there the following year.) Queen of the United Kingdom of Portugal, Brazil and the Algarves (1816)
- Maria Leopoldina, Empress consort (1826)
- Princess Paula (1833)
- Afonso, Prince Imperial (1847)
- Pedro Afonso, Prince Imperial (1850)
- The Marquis of Paraná, Prime Minister (1856)
- Deodoro da Fonseca, former president (1892)
- Afonso Pena, President (1909)
- Artur Bernardes, former president (1955)
- Humberto de Alencar Castelo Branco, former president (1967)
- Artur da Costa e Silva, former president (1969)
- Tancredo Neves, President-elect who died before taking office (1985)
- Ayrton Senna, (3, 4 and 5 May 1994), racing driver
- José Alencar, former vice president (2011)
- Oscar Niemeyer, architect (2012)
- LaMia Flight 2933, Chapecoense plane crash (2016)
- Pelé, footballer (2022)

=== Canada ===
- In August 2011, in a rare circumstance, Prime Minister Stephen Harper offered a state funeral for his political adversary and Leader of the Opposition, Jack Layton. Layton died of cancer three months after his New Democratic Party became the official opposition, for the first time in his party's history.
- In 2014, former finance minister Jim Flaherty received a state funeral after his death.
- In 2024, former prime minister Brian Mulroney received a state funeral after his death.

=== Chile ===
- Salvador Allende (4 September 1990), former president
- Patricio Aylwin (22 April 2016), former president
- Sebastián Piñera (9 February 2024), former president

=== Colombia ===
In Colombia, state funerals are held in the capital, Bogotá, and include a military display, ceremonial pomp, and religious observance. As the highest posthumous honor bestowed upon a person, a state funeral is granted to a sitting or former president of Colombia, a president-elect, and other individuals designated by the Senate. Administered by the Ministry of the Interior and Ministry of the National Defense, state funerals are heavily influenced by protocol, rooted in tradition, and often reflect the choices of the president or their family, who typically handle the planning.

State funerals have been held in Bogotá for:

- Alfonso López Pumarejo (1959)
- Guillermo León Valencia (1971)
- Gustavo Rojas Pinilla (1975)
- Carlos Lleras Restrepo (1994)
- Julio César Turbay Ayala (2005)
- Alfonso López Michelsen (2007)
- Fernando Botero (2023)
- Miguel Uribe Turbay (2025)

=== Cuba ===
- Fidel Castro (4 December 2016), state funeral of former president of Cuba.

=== Dominica ===
- Crispin Sorhaindo (18 January 2010), former president

=== Ecuador ===
- León Febres Cordero (17 December 2008)
- Sixto Durán Ballén (16 November 2016)

=== Grenada ===
- George Brizan (16 March 2012)

=== Haiti ===
- Emmanuel Sanon (22 February 2008), footballer

=== Jamaica ===
- Bob Marley (21 May 1981), Reggae singer. The funeral combined elements of Ethiopian Orthodoxy and Rastafari tradition.
- Hugh Shearer (18 July 2004)
- Edward Seaga (23 June 2019)

=== Mexico ===
- The most recent state funeral held for a president of Mexico was that of Miguel de la Madrid in April 2012.
- Novelist Carlos Fuentes received a state funeral on 16 May 2012, with his funeral cortege briefly stopping traffic in Mexico City.

=== Saint Lucia ===
- Sir William George Mallet (28 October 2010)

=== United States ===
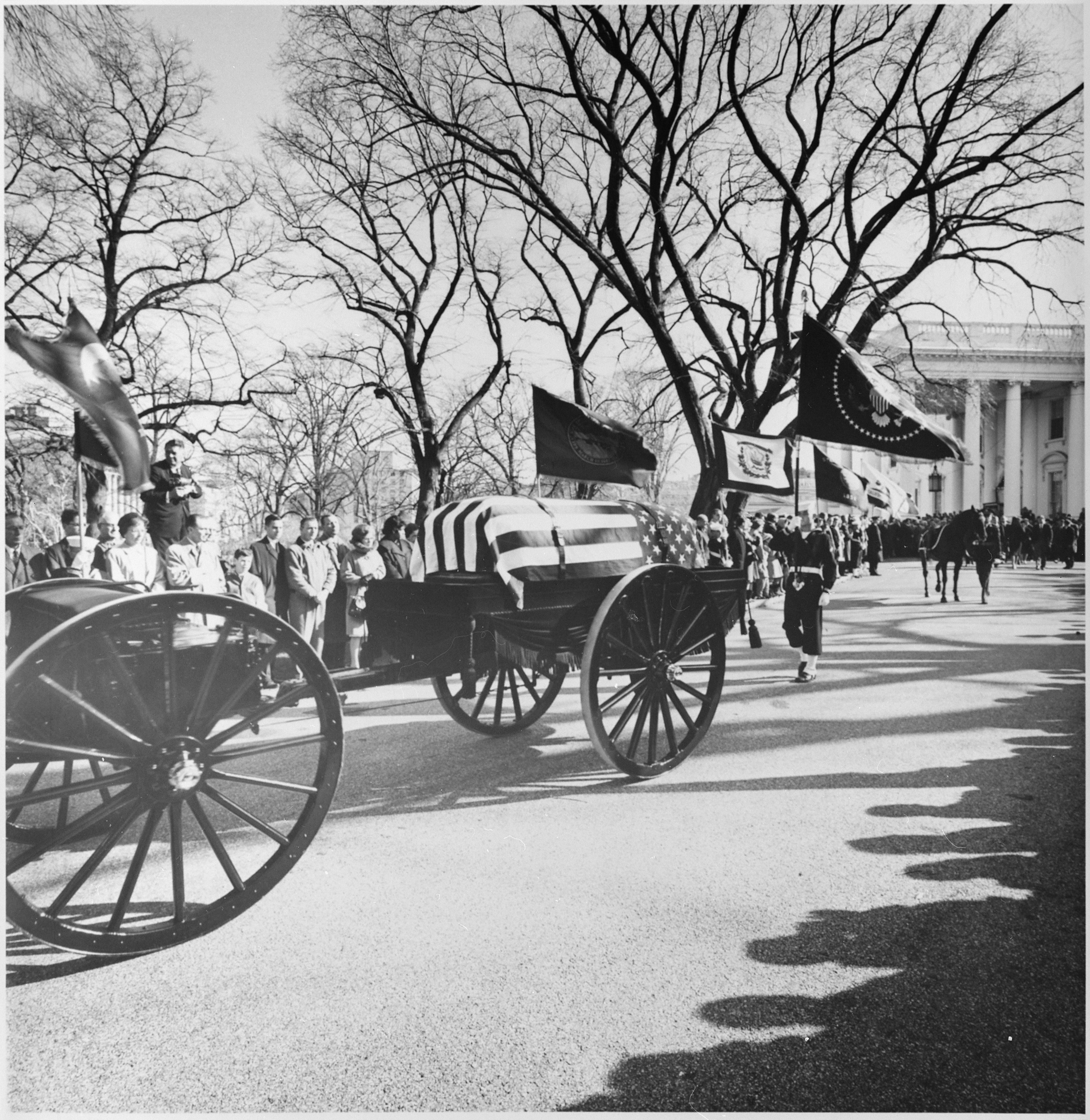
Caisson bearing the casket of U.S. President John F. Kennedy leaving the White House with the color guard and riderless horse following behind on November 25, 1963

In the United States, state funerals are held in the nation's capital, Washington, D.C., and involve military spectacle, ceremonial pomp, and religious observance. As the highest possible honor bestowed upon a person posthumously, state funerals are an entitlement offered to a sitting or former president of the United States, a President-elect, as well as other people designated by the president. Administered by the Military District of Washington (MDW), state funerals are greatly influenced by protocol, steeped in tradition, and rich in history. However, the overall planning as well as the decision to hold a state funeral, is largely determined by the president before his death and the First Family.

State funerals have been held in Washington D.C. for:

- William Henry Harrison (1841)
- Zachary Taylor (1850)
- Abraham Lincoln (1865)
- Thaddeus Stevens (1868)
- James A. Garfield (1881)
- William McKinley (1901)
- Warren G. Harding (1923)
- the Unknown Soldier of World War I (1921)
- William Howard Taft (1930)
- John J. Pershing (1948)
- the Unknown Soldiers of World War II and the Korean War (1958)
- John F. Kennedy (1963)
- Douglas MacArthur (1964)
- Herbert Hoover (1964)
- Dwight D. Eisenhower (1969)
- Lyndon B. Johnson (1973)
- Ronald Reagan (2004)
- Gerald Ford (2006–2007)
- George H. W. Bush (2018)
- Ruth Bader Ginsburg (2020)
- Jimmy Carter (2025)

=== Uruguay ===
- Tabaré Vázquez (December 2020), former president
- José Mujica (15 May 2025), former president
- Rubén Rada (27 August 2026), musician

=== Venezuela ===
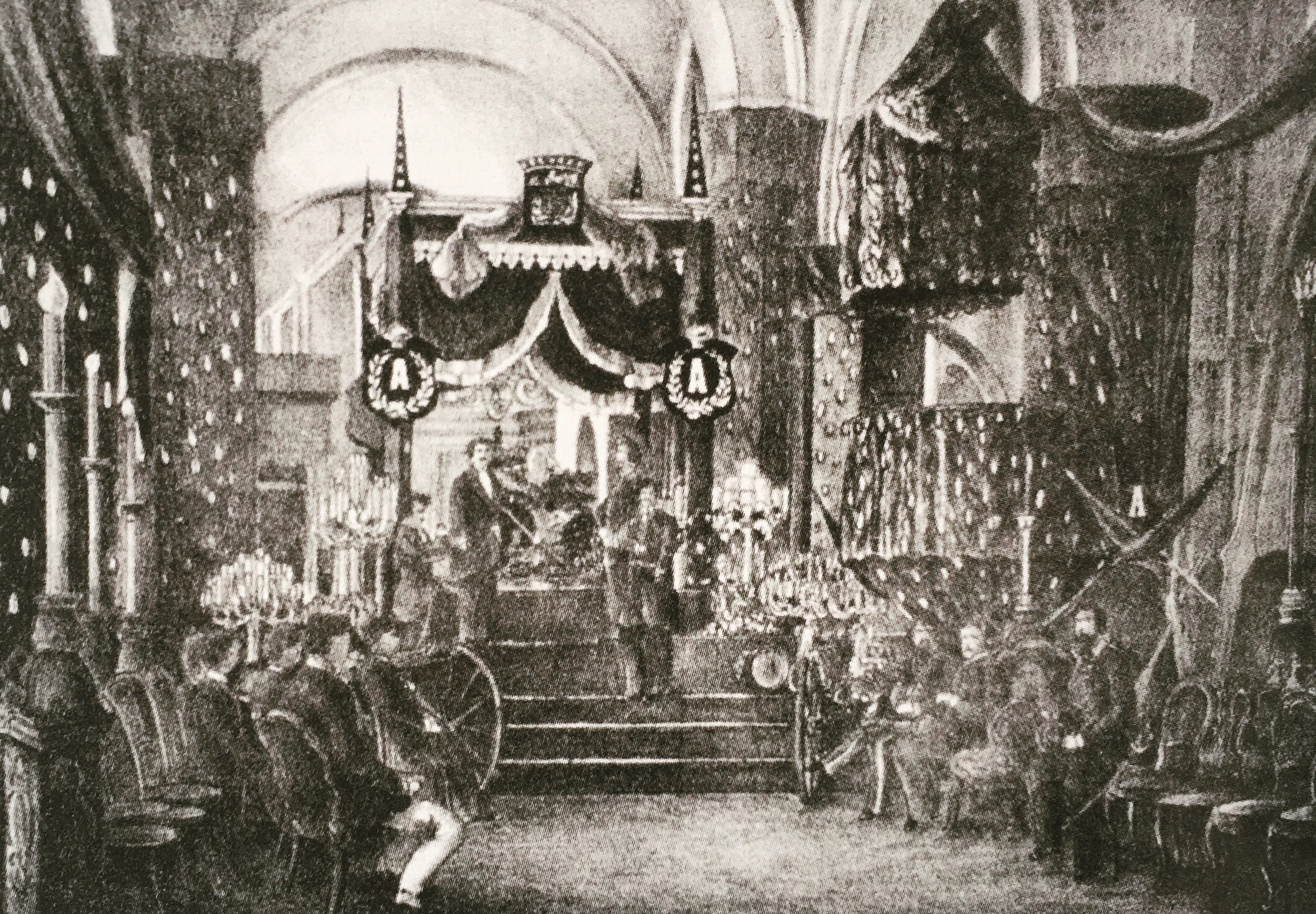
State funeral of Francisco Linares Alcántara

- Francisco Linares Alcántara (1878)
- Juan Vicente Gómez (1935)
- Carlos Delgado Chalbaud (1950)
- Rómulo Gallegos (1969)
- Raúl Leoni (1972)
- Eleazar López Contreras (1973)
- Rómulo Betancourt (1981)
- Hugo Chávez (2013)

== Asia ==
=== Azerbaijan ===
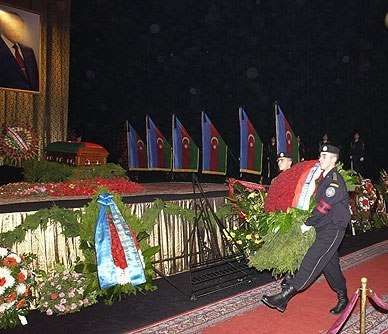
Heydar Aliyev's coffin at the Palace of the Republic

- Former president Abulfaz Elchibey (2000)
- Former president Heydar Aliyev (2003)

=== Bangladesh ===
- Kazi Nazrul Islam (1976)
- Maulana Abdul Hamid Khan Bhasani (1976)
- Ziaur Rahman (1981)
- Abdus Sattar (1985)
- Khondaker Mostaq Ahmed (1996)
- Abu Sadat Mohammad Sayem (1997)
- Mohammad Mohammadullah (1999)
- Sufia Kamal (1999)
- Zillur Rahman (2013)
- Hussain Muhammad Ershad (2019)
- Shahabuddin Ahmed (2022)
- Begum Khaleda Zia (2025)

=== Cambodia ===
- King Norodom Suramarit (1960)
- King Norodom Sihanouk (2012)

=== People's Republic of China ===
- Dong Biwu (1975)
- Zhou Enlai (1976)
- Zhu De (1976)
- Mao Zedong (1976)
- Soong Ching-ling (1981)
- Hu Yaobang (1989)
- Deng Xiaoping (1997)
- Hua Guofeng (2008)
- Qiao Shi (2015)
- Wan Li (2015)
- Li Peng (2019)
- Jiang Zemin (2022)
- Li Keqiang (2023)
- Wu Bangguo (2024)
- Zhu Rongji (2026)

=== Republic of China ===
By the Parliament of the Republic of China

- Cai E (1917)
- Huang Xing (April 15, 1917)
- Sun Yat-sen (June 1, 1929)

By the Canton Military Government

- Cheng Biguang (March 2, 1918)
- Li Zhonglin (1920)
- Lin Xiumei (1921)
- Wu Tingfang (December 3, 1924)
- Liao Zhongkai (August 1925, 1935)

By the Nanking Nationalist Government

- Tan Yankai (1930)
- Lu Shidi (1930)
- Li Yuanhong (1935)
- Duan Qirui (2 November 1936)
- Hu Hanmin (17 June 1936)
- Shao Yuanchong (9 March 1937)
- Zhu Peide (13 March 1937)
- Tang Jiyao (25 December 1937)
- Liu Xiang (14 February 1938)
- Xie Chi (6 May 1939)
- Lin Sen (August 1943)
- Zhang Zizhong (May 28, 1940)
- Tong Linge (28 July 1946)
- Bo Wenwei, Chen Qimei, Zhang Ji, Hao Mengling, Li Jiayu, Qin Zhen (19 May 1948)
- Dai Jitao (April 1949)

By the Government of Republic of China (Taiwan)

- Hu Shih (1962)
- Chen Cheng (1965)
- Chiang Kai-shek (1975)
- Chiang Ching-kuo (1988)
- Yen Chia-kan (22 January 1994)
- Teresa Teng (28 May 1995)
- 8 soldiers who died in the UH-1 tragedy (11 April 2007)
- 8 soldiers who died in 2020 ROCAF UH-60M crash, including Shen Yi-ming (14 January 2020)
- Lee Teng-hui (7 October 2020)

=== Hong Kong ===
==== British Hong Kong ====
- Cai Yuanpei was given Hong Kong's first state funeral in March 1940.
- Edward Youde was given Hong Kong's second state funeral in 1986; died in Beijing and state funeral held in Hong Kong.

==== Hong Kong post-1997 ====
- Ann Tse-kai (2000) - Hong Kong former Legislative Councillor, Executive Councillor of Hong Kong, Chinese People's Political Consultative Conference, Basic Law Committee, Hong Kong Affairs Advisor
- Henry Fok Ying-tung (2006) - died in Beijing and state funeral held in Hong Kong; Hong Kong businessman
- Chuang Shih-ping (2007) - Hong Kong banker
- Tung Chee Hwa (2026) - Hong Kong businessman and politician, first Chief Executive of Hong Kong

=== India ===
Presidents of India (died in office)

- Zakir Husain (1969)
- Fakhruddin Ali Ahmed (1977)

Vice presidents of India (died in office)

- Krishan Kant (2002)

Prime Ministers of India (died in office)

- Jawaharlal Nehru (1964)
- Lal Bahadur Shastri (1966)
- Indira Gandhi (1984)

Former presidents of India

- Rajendra Prasad (1963)
- A. P. J. Abdul Kalam (2015)
- Pranab Mukherjee (2020)

Former prime ministers of India

- Charan Singh (1987)
- Rajiv Gandhi (1991)
- Morarji Desai (1995)
- Gulzarilal Nanda (acting prime minister) (1998)
- P. V. Narasimha Rao (2004)
- Chandra Shekhar (2007)
- V. P. Singh (2008)
- Inder Kumar Gujral (2012)
- Atal Bihari Vajpayee (2018)
- Manmohan Singh (2024)

Union Cabinet Ministers (died in office)

- Ananth Kumar (2018)

Former Union Cabinet Ministers

- Arun Jaitley (2019)

Chief Ministers of India (died in office)

- Gopinath Bordoloi, Chief Minister of Assam (1950)
- Ravishankar Shukla, Chief Minister of Madhya Pradesh (1956)
- Shri Krishna Sinha, Chief Minister of Bihar (1961)
- Bidhan Chandra Roy, Chief Minister of West Bengal (1962)
- Marotrao Kannamwar, Chief Minister of Maharastra (1963)
- Balwantrai Mehta, Chief Minister of Gujarat (1965)
- C. N. Annadurai, Chief Minister of Tamil Nadu (1969)
- Dayanand Bandodkar, Chief Minister of Goa (1973)
- Barkatullah Khan, Chief Minister of Rajasthan (1973)
- Sheikh Abdullah, Chief Minister of Jammu and Kashmir (1982)
- M. G. Ramachandran, Chief Minister of Tamil Nadu (1987)
- Chimanbhai Patel, Chief Minister of Gujarat (1994)
- Beant Singh, Chief Minister of Punjab (1995)
- Y. S. Rajasekhara Reddy, Chief Minister of Andhra Pradesh (2009)
- Dorjee Khandu, Chief Minister of Arunachal Pradesh (2011)
- Mufti Mohammad Sayeed, Chief Minister of Jammu and Kashmir (2016)
- J. Jayalalithaa, Chief Minister of Tamil Nadu (2016)
- Manohar Parrikar, Chief Minister of Goa (2019)

Former chief ministers of India

- P. S. Kumaraswamy Raja, former chief minister of Tamil Nadu (1957)
- Tanguturi Prakasam, former chief minister of Tamil Nadu (1957)
- O. P. Ramaswamy Reddiyar, former chief minister of Tamil Nadu (1970)
- C. Rajagopalachari, former chief minister of Tamil Nadu and last governor-general of India from 1948 to 1950 (1972)
- K. Kamaraj, former chief minister of Tamil Nadu (1975)
- M. Bhaktavatsalam, former chief minister of Tamil Nadu (1987)
- N. T. Rama Rao, former chief minister of Andhra Pradesh (1996)
- E. K. Mawlong, former chief minister of Meghalaya (2008)
- Jyoti Basu, former chief minister of West Bengal (2010)
- M. Karunanidhi, former chief minister of Tamil Nadu (2018)
- N. D. Tiwari, former chief minister of Uttarakhand (2018)
- Madan Lal Khurana, former chief minister of Delhi (2018)
- Sheila Dikshit, former chief minister of Delhi (2019)
- Sushma Swaraj, former chief minister of Delhi (2019)
- Jagannath Mishra, former chief minister of Bihar (2019)
- Babulal Gaur, former chief minister of Madhya Pradesh (2019)
- Tarun Gogoi, former chief minister of Assam (2020)
- Kalyan Singh, former chief minister of Uttar Pradesh (2021)
- Mulayam Singh Yadav, former chief minister of Uttar Pradesh (2022)
- Parkash Singh Badal, former chief minister of Punjab (2023)

Former chief justices of India

- Y. V. Chandrachud (2008)

Recipients of Bharat Ratna

- Mother Teresa (1997)
- Bhimsen Joshi (2011)
- Lata Mangeshkar (2022)

Former Union Ministers of State

- Gurudas Kamat (2018)

Chief of Defence Staff (died in office)

- General Bipin Rawat (2021)

Former Chiefs of Staff of the Indian Armed Forces

- Field Marshal Sam Manekshaw (2008)
- Marshal of the Indian Air Force Arjan Singh (2017)

Former State Cabinet Ministers

- Nandamuri Harikrishna (2018)
- K. M. Mani (2019)

Other personalities who received a state funeral:

- Mahatma Gandhi (1948)
- Mir Osman Ali Khan the last Nizam of Hyderabad (1967)
- Sivaji Ganesan (2001)
- Dr. Rajkumar (2006)
- Dashrath Manjhi (2007)
- Gangubai Hangal (2009)
- Sathya Sai Baba (2011)
- Bal Thackeray (2012)
- Sarabjeet Singh (2013)
- Mohammed Burhanuddin (2014)
- Javare Gowda (2016)
- Kishori Amonkar (2017)
- Shashi Kapoor (2017)
- Sridevi (2018)
- Dada Vaswani (2018)
- Ajit Wadekar (2018)
- Shivakumara Swami (2019)
- Vishwesha Teertha (2019)
- Pandit Jasraj (2020)
- Bannanje Govindacharya (2020)
- Roddam Narasimha (2020)
- Vivek (2021)
- Milkha Singh (2021)
- Dilip Kumar (2021)
- Puneeth Rajkumar (2021)
- Rahul Bajaj (2022)
- Shivkumar Sharma (2022)
- Ratan Tata (2024)
- Manoj Kumar (2025)
- Asha Bhosle (2026)
- Bharathiraja (2026)
- Salim Kumar (2026)
- K. Bhagyaraj (2026)
- S Janaki (2026)

=== Indonesia ===
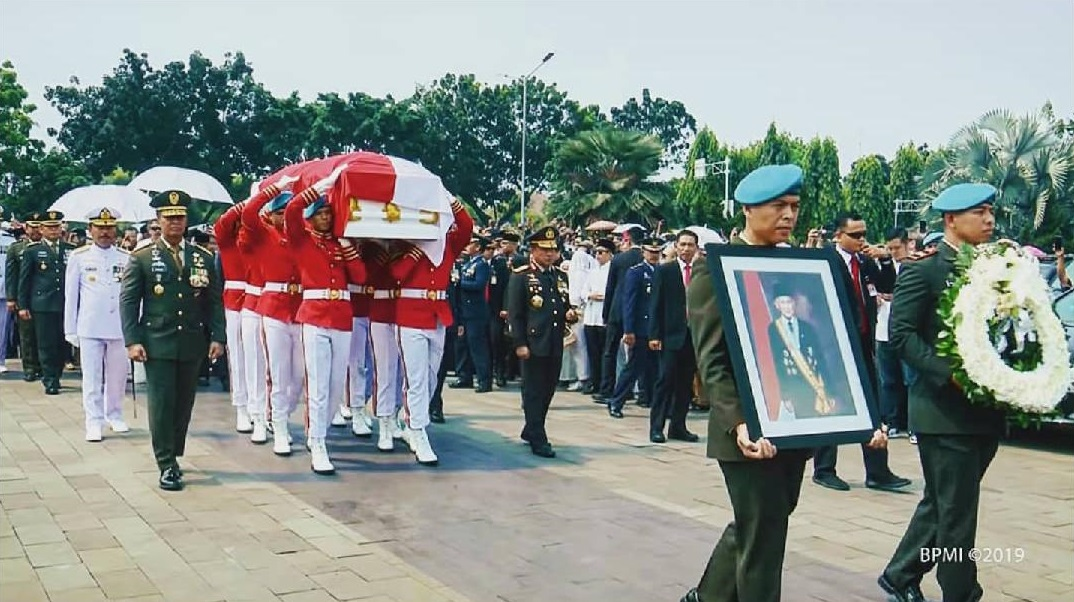
The state funeral procession of B. J. Habibie at the Kalibata Heroes' Cemetery, Jakarta on 12 September 2019

State funerals has been arranged on the respective dates:

- Sudirman (30 January 1950)
- The seven victims of the 30 September Movement (5 October 1965)
- Sukarno (22 June 1970)
- Mohammad Hatta (15 March 1980)
- Hamengkubuwono IX (8 October 1988)
- Siti Hartinah (29 April 1996)
- Suharto (28 January 2008)
- Abdurrahman Wahid (31 December 2009)
- Hasri Ainun Habibie (25 May 2010)
- Ani Yudhoyono (2 June 2019)
- B. J. Habibie (12 September 2019)

=== Iran ===
- Naser al-Din Shah Qajar (May 1896)
- Mozaffar ad-Din Shah Qajar (January 1907)
- Reza Shah (May 1950)
- Ali Razmara (9 March 1951)
- Hassan-Ali Mansur (27 January 1965)
- Mohammad Ali Rajai and Mohammad Javad Bahonar (30 August 1981)
- Ruhollah Khomeini (5 June 1989)
- Mohammad-Reza Mahdavi Kani (23 October 2014)
- Akbar Hashemi Rafsanjani (10 January 2017)
- Mahmoud Hashemi Shahroudi (26 December 2018)
- Qasem Soleimani (4 January 2020)
- Ebrahim Raisi (22 May 2024)
- Ali Khamenei (4 July 2026)

=== Iraq ===
- Ahmed Hassan al-Bakr (1982)
- Abu Mahdi al-Muhandis (2020)
- Saddam Hussein (2006)

=== Japan ===
==== Formal state funeral ====
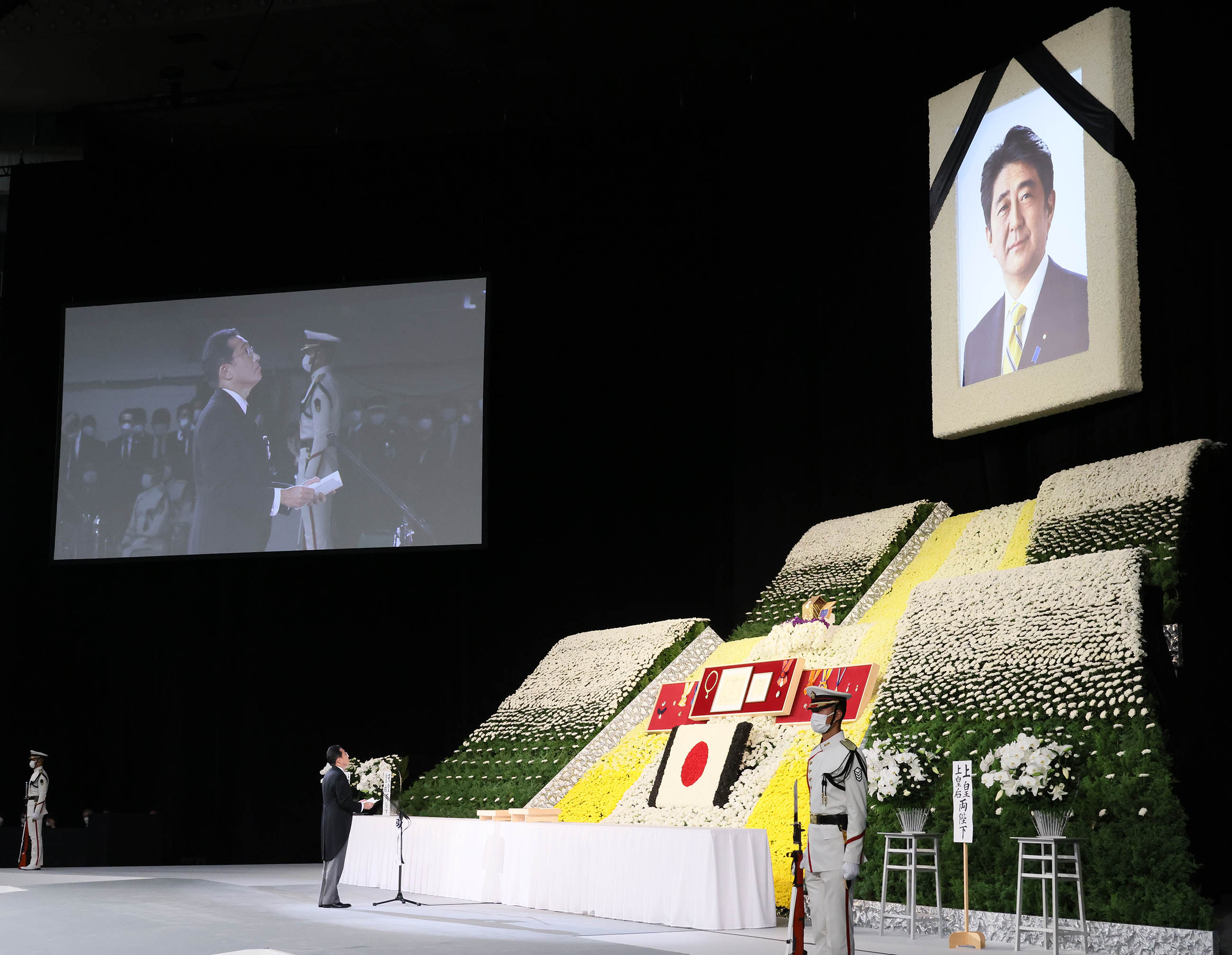
Fumio Kishida expressing the memorial address at the State Funeral of Shinzo Abe

- Okubo Toshimichi (1878)
- Iwakura Tomomi (1883)
- Shimazu Hisamitsu (1887)
- Sanjō Sanetomi (1891)
- Prince Arisugawa Taruhito (1895)
- Prince Kitashirakawa Yoshihisa (1895)
- Mouri Motonori (1896)
- Empress Eishō (1897)
- Shimazu Tadayoshi (2nd) (1898)
- Prince Komatsu Akihito (1903)
- Itō Hirobumi (1909)
- Emperor Meiji (1912)
- Prince Arisugawa Takehito (1913)
- Ōyama Iwao (1916)
- Gojong of Korea (1919)
- Yamagata Aritomo (1922)
- Prince Fushimi Sadanaru (1923)
- Matsukata Masayoshi (1924)
- Sunjong of Korea (1926)
- Emperor Taishō (1926)
- Tōgō Heihachirō (1934)
- Saionji Kinmochi (1940)
- Isoroku Yamamoto (1943)
- Prince Kan'in Kotohito (1945)
- Empress Teimei (1951)
- Shigeru Yoshida (1967)
- Emperor Shōwa (1989)
- Shinzō Abe (2022)

==== Funeral where the state is involved ====
- Ōkuma Shigenobu (1922)
- Kijūrō Shidehara (1951)
- Yukio Ozaki (1954)
- Tsuneo Matsudaira (1954)
- Eisaku Satō (1975)
- Masayoshi Ōhira (1980)
- Nobusuke Kishi (1987)
- Takeo Miki (1988)
- Akira Ono (1990)
- Takeo Fukuda (1995)
- Keizō Obuchi (2000)
- Zenkō Suzuki (2004)
- Ryutaro Hashimoto (2006)
- Kiichi Miyazawa (2007)
- Takeo Nishioka (2011)
- Yasuhiro Nakasone (2020)

=== Laos ===
- Kaysone Phomvihane (1992)
- Xaysomphone Phomvihane (2026)

=== Malaysia ===
Malaysia held the state funerals for the following people:

Prime Ministers of Malaysia

- Abdul Razak Hussein (1976)
- Tunku Abdul Rahman (1990)
- Abdullah Ahmad Badawi (2025)

Spouse of the Prime Minister of Malaysia

- Siti Hasmah (2026)

Deputy Prime Ministers of Malaysia

- Tun Dr Ismail Abdul Rahman (1973)

Other personalities that were given military honors in lieu of a state funeral

- P. Ramlee (1973)

=== North Korea ===
State funerals are infrequent in North Korea. Funerals, and who appears on official funeral committees, are considered important cues on power hierarchies of North Korean politics. According to a tradition inherited from the Soviet Union, the chairperson of the funeral committee of a deceased leader of North Korea is beyond all doubt the next leader. This held true when Kim Il Sung died in 1994 and was succeeded by Kim Jong Il, who in turn was succeeded by Kim Jong Un in 2011.

- Pak Tal
- Jang Kil-bu
- Ho Hon (1951)
- Hong Won-kil (1976)
- Nam Il (1976)
- Choe Yong-gon (army commander) (1976)
- Jang Chol-gu (1982)
- Kim Il (1984), whose funeral committee consisted of 69 people.
- Rim Chun-chu (1988), whose funeral committee consisted of 57 people.
- Choe Tok-sin (1989), whose funeral committee consisted of 23 people.
- So Chol (1992)
- Kang Hui-won (1994)
- Death and state funeral of Kim Il Sung (1994), whose funeral committee consisted of 273 people.
- O Jin-u (1995), whose funeral committee consisted of 240.
- Choe Kwang (1997), whose funeral committee consisted of 85 people.
- Kim Kwang-jin (1997)
- Ri Jong-ok (1999), whose funeral committee consisted of 60 people.
- Kim Pyong-sik (1999), whose funeral committee consisted of 18 people.
- Jon Mun-sop (1999)
- Choi Hong-hui (2002), whose funeral committee consisted of 14 people.
- Ri Tu-ik (2002)
- Yon Hyong-muk (2005), whose funeral committee consisted of 49 people.
- Pak Song-chol (2008), whose funeral committee consisted of 65 people.
- Hong Song-nam (2009), whose funeral committee consisted of 35 people.
- Kim Jung-rin (2010), whose funeral committee consisted of 41 people.
- Jo Myong-rok (2010), whose funeral committee consisted of 171 people.
- Pak Jong-sun (2011), whose funeral committee consisted of 47 people.
- Death and state funeral of Kim Jong Il (2011), whose funeral committee consisted of 232 people.
- Kim Kuk-thae (2013), whose funeral committee consisted of 54 people.
- Jon Pyong-ho (2014), whose funeral committee consisted of 89 people.
- Kim Yang-gon (2015), whose funeral committee consisted of 70 people.
- Ri Ul-sol (2015), whose funeral committee consisted of 169 people.
- Kang Sok-ju (2016), whose funeral committee consisted of 53 people.
- Ryu Mi-yong (2016), whose funeral committee consisted of 11 people.
- Kang Ki-sop (2017)
- Kim Yong-chun (2018), whose funeral committee consisted of 149 people.
- Kim Chol-man (2018), whose funeral committee consisted of 71 people.
- Hwang Sun-hui (2020), whose funeral committee consisted of 69 people.
- Hyon Chol-hae (2022), whose funeral committee consisted of 184 people.
- Kim Ki-nam (2024)
- Kim Yong-nam (2025)

=== Pakistan ===
Pakistan held the state funerals for the following people:

- Muhammad Ali Jinnah (1948) – Father of the Nation and the 1st Governor-General of Pakistan (1947–48): died in office
- Muhammad Zia-ul-Haq (1988) – 6th president of Pakistan (1978–88) and 2nd Chief of Army Staff (1976–88): died in office
- Mushaf Ali Mir (2003) – 9th Chief of Air Staff (2000–03): died in office
- Anwar Shamim (2013) – 3rd Chief of Air Staff (1978–85)
- Abdul Sattar Edhi (2016) – Philanthropist and founder of Edhi Foundation
- Ruth Pfau (2017) – Physician who devoted more than 55 years of her life to fighting leprosy in Pakistan
- Asghar Khan (2018) – 5th commander-in-chief of the Pakistan Air Force (1957–65)
- Abdul Qadeer Khan (2021) – Nuclear physicist who is colloquially known as the "Father of Pakistan's atomic weapons program"

=== Philippines ===
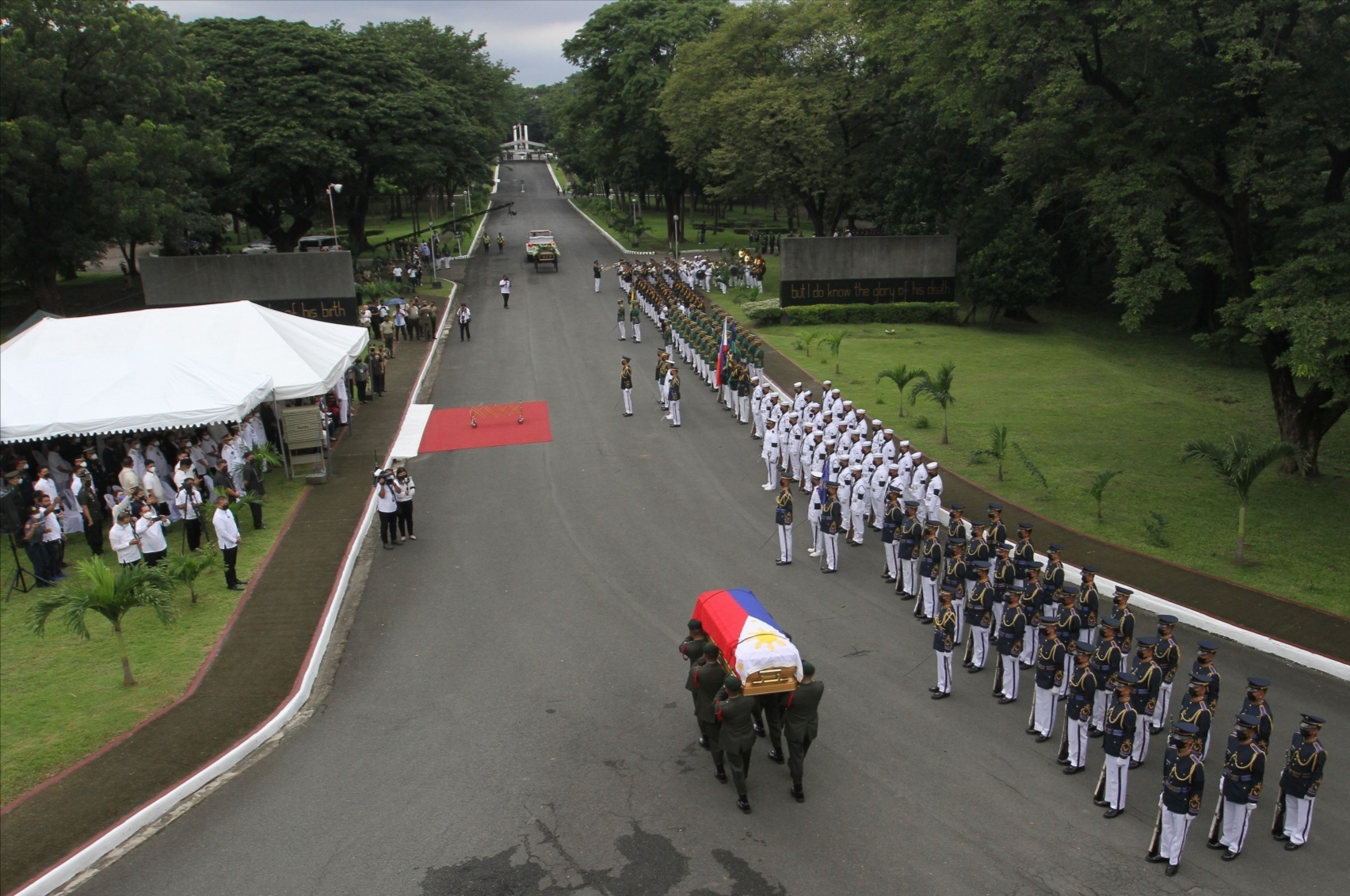
Former President Fidel V. Ramos is laid to rest at the Libingan ng mga Bayani in Taguig on August 9, 2022.

The Philippines held the state funerals for the following people:

Presidents of the Philippines

- Manuel L. Quezon (1944) – 2nd president of the Philippines (1935–44): died in office
- Manuel Roxas (1948) – 5th president of the Philippines (1946–48): died in office
- Elpidio Quirino (1956) – 6th president of the Philippines (1948–53)
- Ramon Magsaysay (1957) – 7th president of the Philippines (1953–57): died in office
- Jose P. Laurel (1959) – 3rd president of the Philippines (1943–45)
- Sergio Osmeña (1961) – 4th president of the Philippines (1944–46)
- Emilio Aguinaldo (1964) – 1st president of the Philippines (1899–1901)
- Carlos P. Garcia (1971) – 8th president of the Philippines (1957–61)
- Diosdado Macapagal (1997) – 9th president of the Philippines (1961–65)
- Fidel V. Ramos (2022) – 12th president of the Philippines (1992–98)

Presidents of the Philippines that were given military honors in lieu of a state funeral

- Corazon Aquino (2009) – 11th president of the Philippines (1986–92)
- Elpidio Quirino (reburial) (2016) – 6th president of the Philippines (1948–53)
- Ferdinand Marcos (exhumation and burial) (2016) – 10th president of the Philippines (1965–86)
- Benigno Aquino III (2021) – 15th president of the Philippines (2010–16)

Vice-presidents of the Philippines

- Fernando Lopez (1993) – 3rd and 7th vice-president of the Philippines (1949–1953; 1965–72)
- Emmanuel Pelaez (2003) – 6th vice-president of the Philippines (1961–65)
- Salvador Laurel (2004) – 8th vice-president of the Philippines (1986–92)

Cabinet Secretaries and Ministers

- Carlos P. Romulo (1985) – Secretary and Minister of Foreign Affairs (1968–84): died in office
- Blas Ople (2003) – Secretary of Foreign Affairs (2002–03): died in office
- Jesse Robredo (2012) – Secretary of Interior and Local Government (2010–12): died in office
- Susan Ople (2023) – Secretary of Migrant Workers (2022–23): died in office
- Juan Ponce Enrile (2025) – Chief Presidential Legal Counsel (2022–25) and Secretary and Minister of National Defense (1970–71; 1972-1986): died in office

Senators of the Philippines

- Benigno Aquino Jr. (1983) – Senator of the Philippines (1967–72)
- Miriam Defensor Santiago (2016) – Senator of the Philippines (1995–2001; 2004–16)

National Scientists of the Philippines

- Perla Santos-Ocampo (2012) – National Scientist of the Philippines
- Ramon Barba (2021) – National Scientist of the Philippines

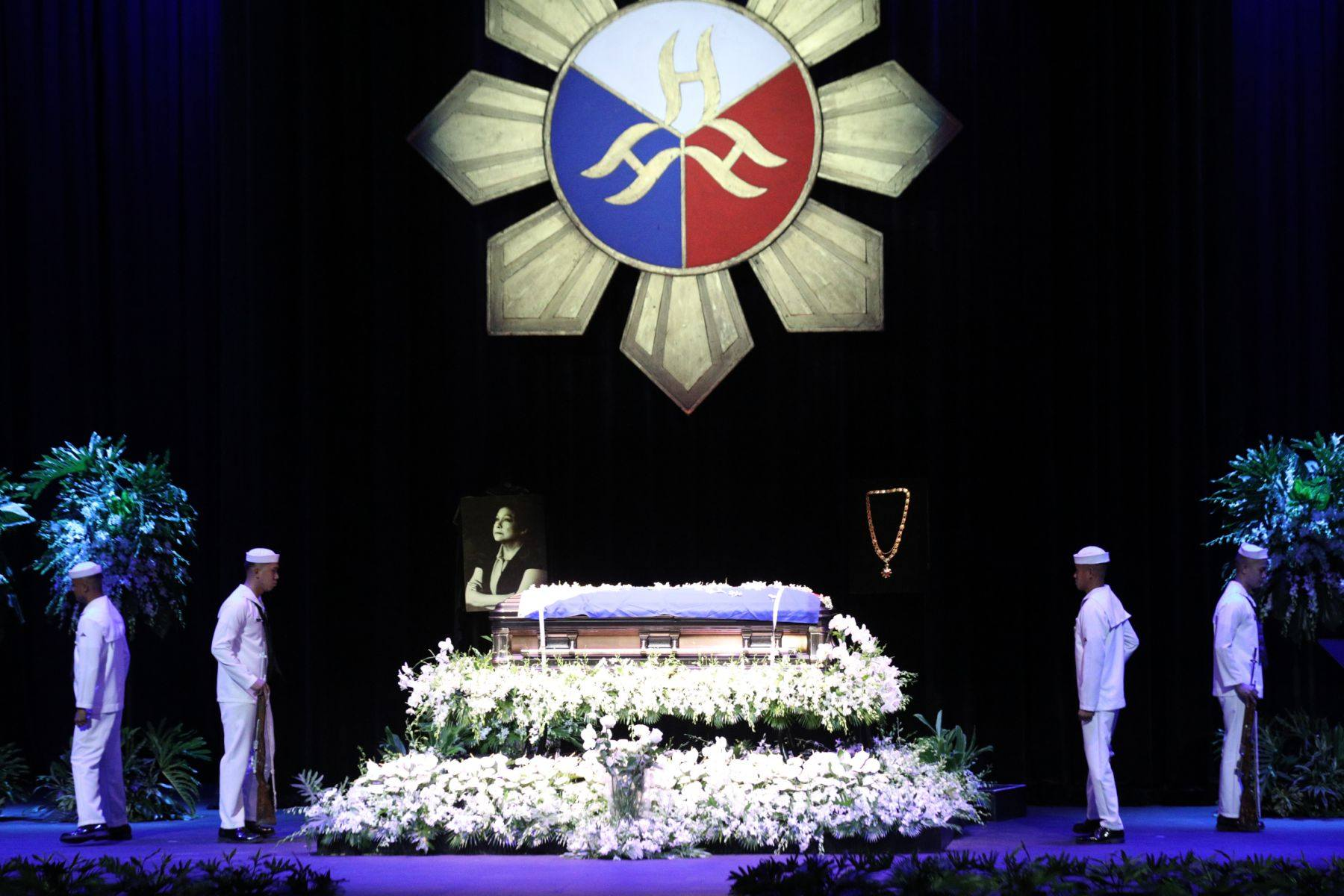
Nora Aunor accorded a state memorial service held at the Manila Metropolitan Theater on April 22, 2025.

National Artists of the Philippines

- Cesar Legaspi (1994) – National Artist of the Philippines for Visual Arts (Note: Remains were subsequently removed from the Libingan ng mga Bayani on August 8, 2016.)
- Nick Joaquin (2004) – National Artist of the Philippines for Literature
- Ramon Obusan (2006) – National Artist of the Philippines for Dance
- Daisy Avellana (2013) – National Artist of the Philippines for Theater
- Francisco Feliciano (2014) – National Artist of the Philippines for Music
- Napoleon Abueva (2018) – National Artist of the Philippines for Visual Arts
- Cirilo Bautista (2018) – National Artist of the Philippines for Visual Arts
- Francisco Mañosa (2019) – National Artist of the Philippines for Architecture
- Amelia Lapeña-Bonifacio (2021) – National Artist of the Philippines for Theater
- Bienvenido Lumbera (burial) (2022) – National Artist of the Philippines for Literature
- F. Sionil José (2022) – National Artist of the Philippines for Literature
- Arturo Luz (burial) (2022) – National Artist of the Philippines for Visual Arts
- Marilou Diaz-Abaya (exhumation and burial) (2022) – National Artist of the Philippines for Film and Broadcast Arts
- Ishmael Bernal (exhumation and burial) (2024) – National Artist of the Philippines for Film
- Nora Aunor (2025) – National Artist of the Philippines for Film and Broadcast Arts

Gawad Manlilkha ng Bayan (National Living Treasures Award)

- Lang Dulay (2015) – Weaving (T’nalak)
- Yabing Masalon Dulo (2021) – Weaving (Ikat)
- Federico Caballero (2024) – Epic Chanter of Kinaray-a and Other Languages

Other personalities who received a state funeral

- José Rizal (exhumation and reburial) (1912)
- Marcelo H. del Pilar (exhumation and reburial) (1920)
- Jaime Sin (2005) – 30th archbishop of Manila (1974–2005)

=== Sri Lanka ===
A state funeral was arranged for the following people after their death on the respective dates: Most Funerals were held at the historic Independence Memorial Hall.

- D.S. Senanayake (25 March 1952) – 1st prime minister and father of the Nation of Sri Lanka.
- S. W. R. D. Bandaranaike (September 1959) 3rd prime minister of Sri Lanka
- Vijaya Kumaratunga (21 February 1988) Sri Lankan political activist, opposition leader, and movie star.

- Ranasinghe Premadasa (5 May 1993) – 3rd president of Sri Lanka.

- Gamini Dissanayake 25 October 1994 – Leader of the Opposition of Sri Lanka.
- J. R. Jayewardene (3 November 1996) 2nd – President of Sri Lanka.
- Sirimavo Bandaranaike (15 October 2000) – World's first female prime minister
- Lakshman Kadirgamar (2005) – Foreign Minister of Sri Lanka.
- Sir Arthur C. Clarke (March 19, 2008) – English science fiction writer, science writer
- D.B. Wijetunga (25 September 2008) 4th – President of Sri Lanka.
- Ven Maduluwawe Sobitha Thero (9 November 2015) – Spiritual leader.
- Pandith W.D. Amaradeva (16 November 2016)Sri Lankan music legend

- Dr. Lester James Peiris (1 May 2018) Acclaimed filmmaker, Father of Sri Lankan Cinema.
- A. T. Ariyaratne (April 17, 2024) Founder and the president emeritus of the Sarvodaya Shramadana Movement of Sri Lanka
- Malani Fonseka (26 May 2025) – Queen of Sinhala Cinema.

=== Singapore ===
A state funeral was arranged for the following people on their deathbed on the respective date:

- Ahmad Ibrahim (21 August 1962) – minister of health and labour
- Yusof Ishak (23 November 1970) – 1st president of Singapore
- Benjamin Henry Sheares (12 May 1981) – 2nd president of Singapore
- Wee Kim Wee (2 May 2005) – 4th president of Singapore
- S. Rajaratnam (25 February 2006) – former deputy prime minister of Singapore
- Goh Keng Swee (23 May 2010) – former deputy prime minister of Singapore
- Kwa Geok Choo (2 October 2010) – spouse of Lee Kuan Yew
- Lee Kuan Yew (23 March 2015) – 1st prime minister of Singapore
- S. R. Nathan (22 August 2016) – 6th president of Singapore

Another type of funeral in Singapore is a state-assisted funeral. Similar to a state funeral, the deceased may or may not be entitled to a ceremonial gun carriage, though he/she does not lie in state in the Istana. Such funerals are accorded to:

- Ong Teng Cheong (11 February 2002) – 5th president of Singapore
- Lim Kim San (20 July 2006) – former Cabinet minister
- Toh Chin Chye (7 February 2012) – former deputy prime minister
- Othman Wok (17 April 2017) – former Cabinet minister
- Puan Noor Aishah (22 April 2025) – 1st spouse of the President of Singapore

=== South Korea ===
Previously, there were national funerals (국민장) and state funerals (국장). However, in 2009, the funeral of Roh Moo-hyun was held as a national funeral and that of Kim Dae-jung as a state funeral. This sparked controversy over the formality of the funeral, and the revision of the law in 2011 merged the two types of funerals into the state funeral (국가장).

State funerals in South Korea are a mix of the Western and Korean funeral traditions, which are modern adaptations of the rites held in the funerals of Emperors of Korea.

The following individuals have received state or national funerals in South Korea;

- Empress Sunjeonghyo (1963)
- Kim Koo (1949)
- Yi Si-yeong (1953)
- Kim Seong-su (1955)
- Sin Ik-hui (1956)
- Chough Pyung-ok (1960)
- Yi Tjoune (1963)
- Ham Tae-young (1964)
- Chang Myon (1966)
- Chang Taek-sang (1969)
- Lee Beom-seok (1972)
- Yuk Young-soo (1974)
- Park Chung-hee (1979)
- 16 victims who died in the Rangoon Bombing (1983)
- Yi Bangja (1989)
- Choi Kyu-hah (2006)
- Roh Moo-hyun (2009)
- Kim Dae-jung (2009)
- Kim Young-sam (2015)
- Kim Jong-pil (2018)
- Roh Hoe-chan (2018)
- Roh Tae-woo (2021)
- 159 victims who died in the Halloween crush (2022)

=== Thailand ===
In Thailand, state funerals are mostly analogous to the royal funerals held for the monarch and members of the Royal Family. Royal ceremonies are also held for the cremation of the supreme patriarch and senior members of the Buddhist clergy.

=== Turkey ===
- Mustafa Kemal Atatürk (1938)
- Talaat Pasha (1943)
- Turgut Özal (1993)
- Kenan Evren (2015)
- Süleyman Demirel (2015)
- Yıldırım Akbulut (2021)

=== Vietnam ===
A state funeral was arranged for the following people on their deathbed on the respective date:

- Huỳnh Thúc Kháng (1947)
- Hồ Chí Minh (1969)
- Nguyễn Lương Bằng (1979)
- Tôn Đức Thắng (1980)
- Lê Duẩn (1986)
- Phạm Hùng (1988)
- Trường Chinh (1988)
- Lê Đức Thọ (1990)
- Hoàng Quốc Việt (1992)
- Nguyễn Hữu Thọ (1996)
- Nguyễn Văn Linh (1998)
- Lê Quang Đạo (1999)
- Phạm Văn Đồng (2000)
- Võ Văn Kiệt (2008)
- Võ Chí Công (2011)
- Võ Nguyên Giáp (2013)
- Phan Văn Khải (2018)
- Trần Đại Quang (2018)
- Đỗ Mười (2018)
- Lê Đức Anh (2019)
- Lê Khả Phiêu (2020)
- Nguyễn Phú Trọng (2024)
- Trần Đức Lương (2025)

== Europe ==
=== Andorra ===
- Antoni Martí, former prime minister (2023)

=== Belgium ===
- Albert I (1934)
- Baudouin (1993)
- Frank Swaelen (2007)
- Frank Van der Elst
- Gaston Eyskens (1988)
- Gaston Geens (2002)
- Herman Vanderpoorten (1984)
- Jean-Luc Dehaene (2014)
- Karel Poma (2014)
- Leo Tindemans (2014)
- Leopold I (1865)
- Leopold II (1909)
- Leopold III (1983)
- Pierre Harmel (2009)
- Wilfried Martens (2013)
- Willy De Clercq (2011)

=== Cyprus ===
In Cyprus state funerals are made for former presidents.

- Archbishop Makarios III (1977)
- Spyros Kyprianou (2002)
- Tassos Papadopoulos (2008)
- Glafcos Clerides (2013)
- Demetris Christofias (2019)
- George Vassiliou (2026)

=== Denmark ===
- On 29 August 1945, two years after the German occupation force in Denmark had dissolved the Danish army and navy, a state funeral was held for 106 killed members of the Danish resistance at their execution site which was thus inaugurated as the memorial cemetery that would later become Ryvangen Memorial Park. While flags were flying half-mast throughout Copenhagen 106 hearses drove from the Christiansborg Riding Grounds through the city to Ryvangen, where bishop Hans Fuglsang-Damgaard led the funeral with participation from the royal family, the government and representatives of the resistance movement.

=== Czech Republic ===
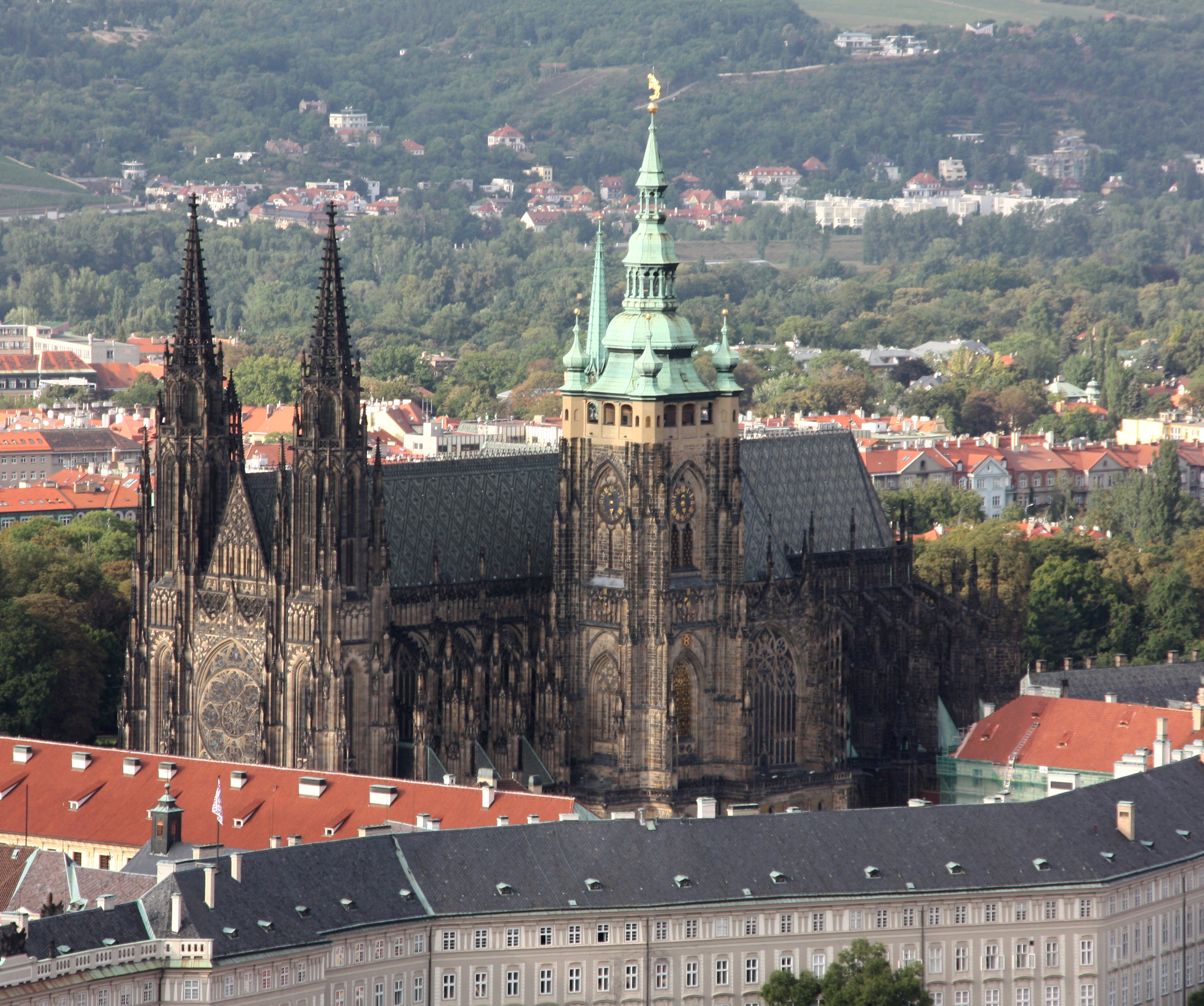
The funeral ceremony takes place in the St. Vitus Cathedral at Prague Castle.

==== State funerals ====
- Charles IV, Holy Roman Emperor (1378)
- Ferdinand I of Austria (1875)
- Alois Eliáš (2006; a state funeral did not take place until 64 years after he died in 1942)
- President Václav Havel (2011)

==== Funerals with state honors ====
- Jaroslav Seifert (1986)
- Vladimír Menšík (1988)
- Otakar Motejl (2010)
- Karel Gott (2019)
- Vlasta Chramostová (2019)
- Karel Schwarzenberg (2023)
- Milan Knížák (2026)

==== Czechoslovakia ====
- Alois Rašín (1923)
- Lev Robert Melč (1934)
- Karel Kramář (1937)
- President Tomáš Masaryk (1937)
- Jan Masaryk (1948)
- President Edvard Beneš (1948)
- President Klement Gottwald (1953)
- Václav Nosek (1955)
- President Antonín Zápotocký (1957)
- Vítězslav Nezval (1958)
- Václav Kopecký (1961)
- President Ludvík Svoboda (1979)

=== Finland ===
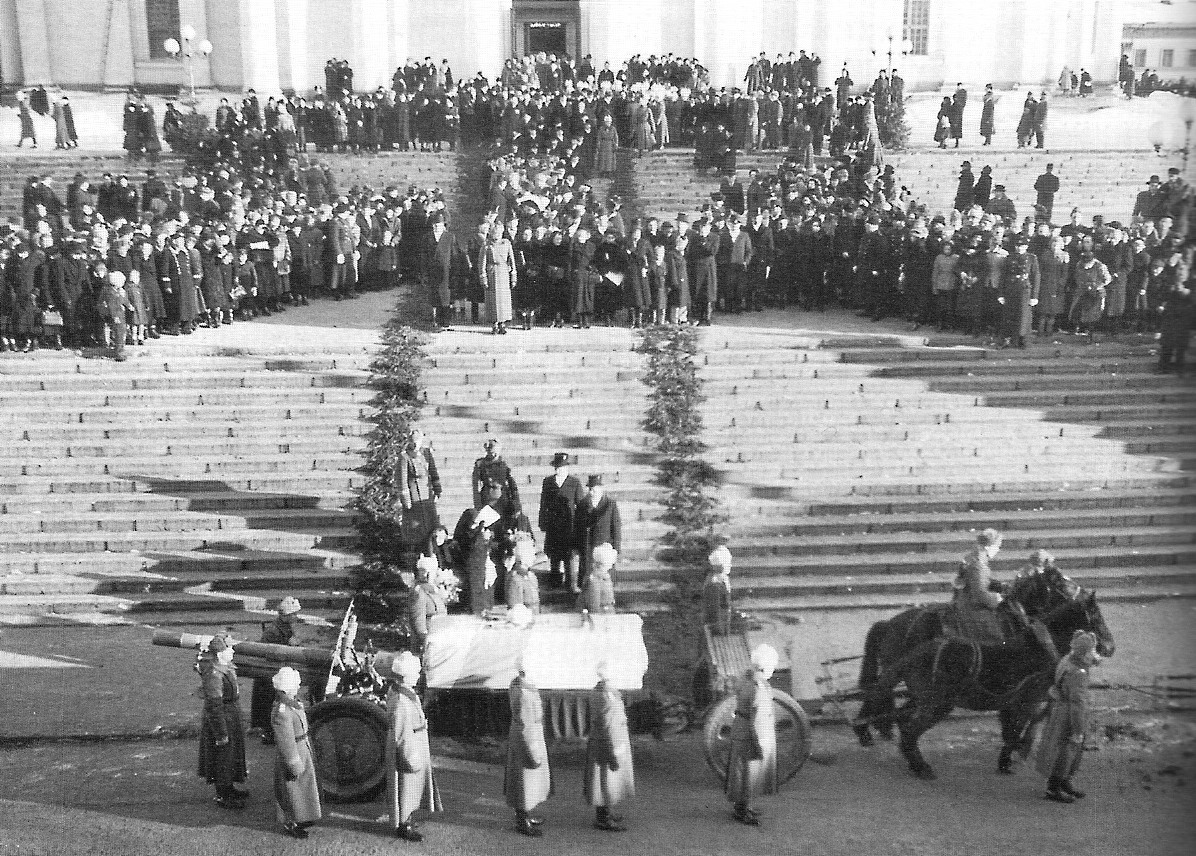
Funeral cortege of President Carl Gustaf Emil Mannerheim in Helsinki, 1951

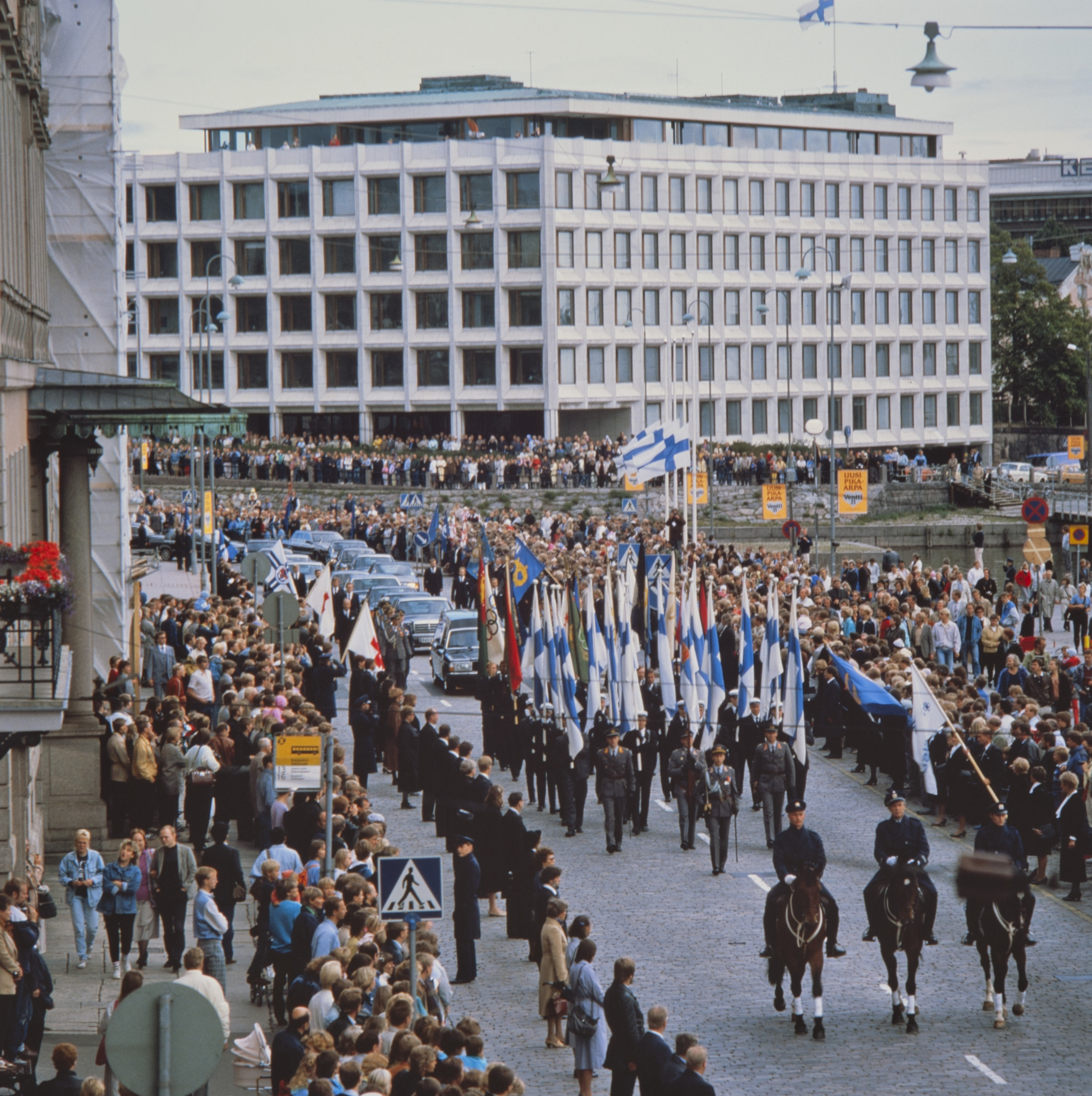
Funeral cortege of President Urho Kekkonen in Helsinki, 1986

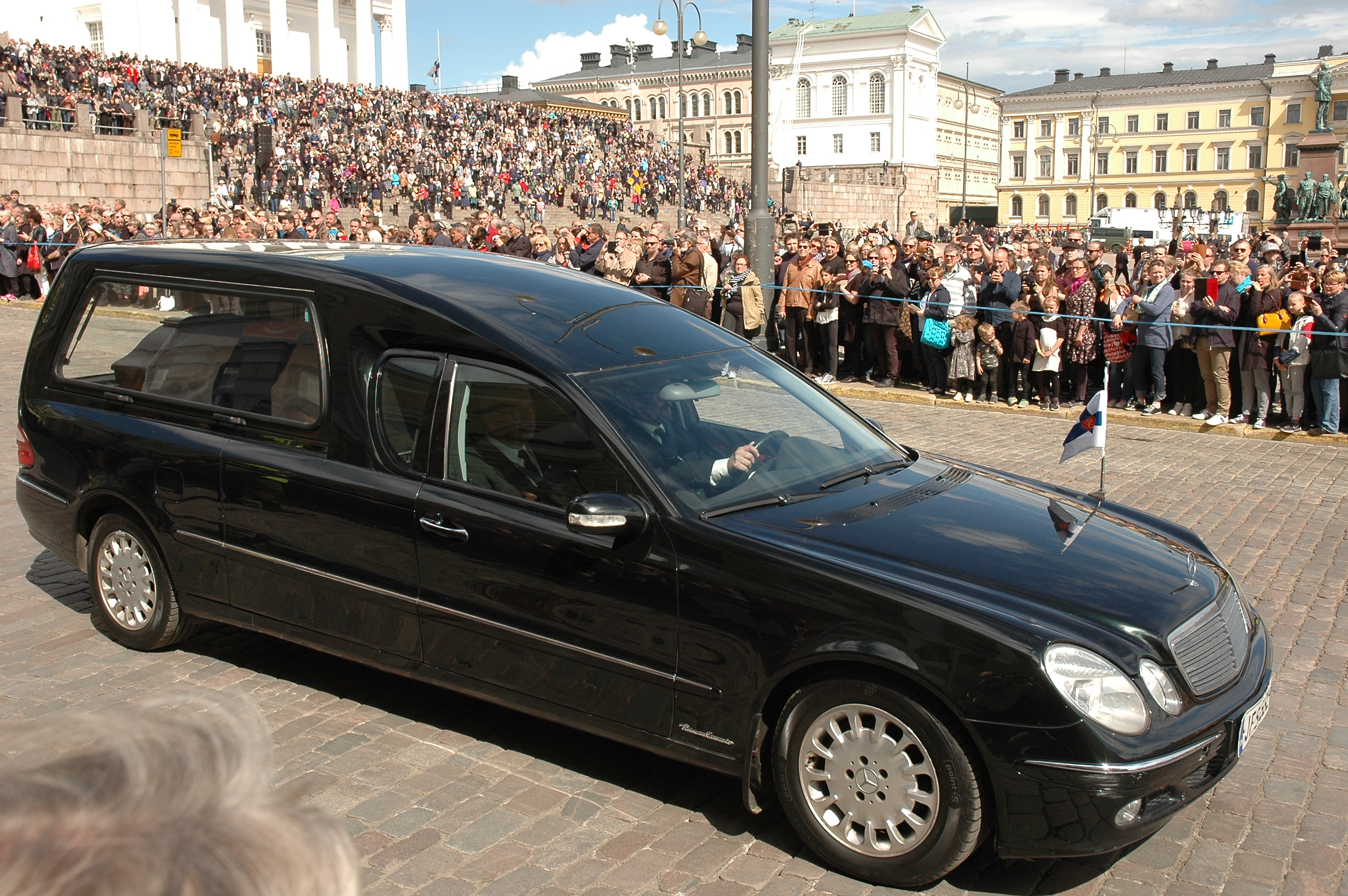
Funeral cortege of President Mauno Koivisto in Helsinki, 2017

82 people have been awarded the honour of state funeral, among them:

- 1921 Juhani Aho, author, the first person honoured with a state funeral in Finland
- 1926 Eino Leino, author and poet
- 1941 Kyösti Kallio, the 4th president of Finland
- 1944 Pehr Evind Svinhufvud, the 3rd president of Finland
- 1947 Vera Hjelt, member of Parliament, pioneer of work safety in Finland
- 1951 Carl Gustaf Emil Mannerheim, the marshal of Finland and the 6th president of Finland
- 1952 Kaarlo Juho Ståhlberg, the 1st president of Finland
- 1952 Miina Sillanpää, the first female minister in Finland
- 1956 Risto Ryti, the 5th president of Finland
- 1956 Juho Kusti Paasikivi, the 7th president of Finland
- 1957 Jean Sibelius, composer
- 1966 Hannes Kolehmainen, the first Finnish Olympic medalist (long-distance running)
- 1966 Wäinö Aaltonen, sculptor
- 1973 Paavo Nurmi, the most successful Finnish Olympic medalist (long-distance running)
- 1974 Sylvi Kekkonen, First Lady of Finland
- 1976 Armas Taipale, Olympic medalist (discus)
- 1980 Rafael Paasio, former prime minister and Speaker of the Parliament
- 1982 Ville Ritola, Olympic medalist (long-distance running)
- 1986 Urho Kekkonen, the 8th president of Finland
- 1987 Ella Eronen, actress
- 1989 Tapani Niku, Olympic medalist (cross-country skiing)
- 1990 Ahti Karjalainen, former prime minister
- 1992 Väinö Linna, author
- 1995 Väinö Valve, general
- 2000 Johannes Virolainen, former prime minister, Counsellor of State
- 2004 Kalevi Sorsa, former prime minister
- 2004 Adolf Ehrnrooth, General of the Infantry
- 2011 Harri Holkeri, former prime minister, Counsellor of State
- 2017 Mauno Koivisto, the 9th president of Finland
- 2023 Martti Ahtisaari, the 10th president of Finland

=== France ===
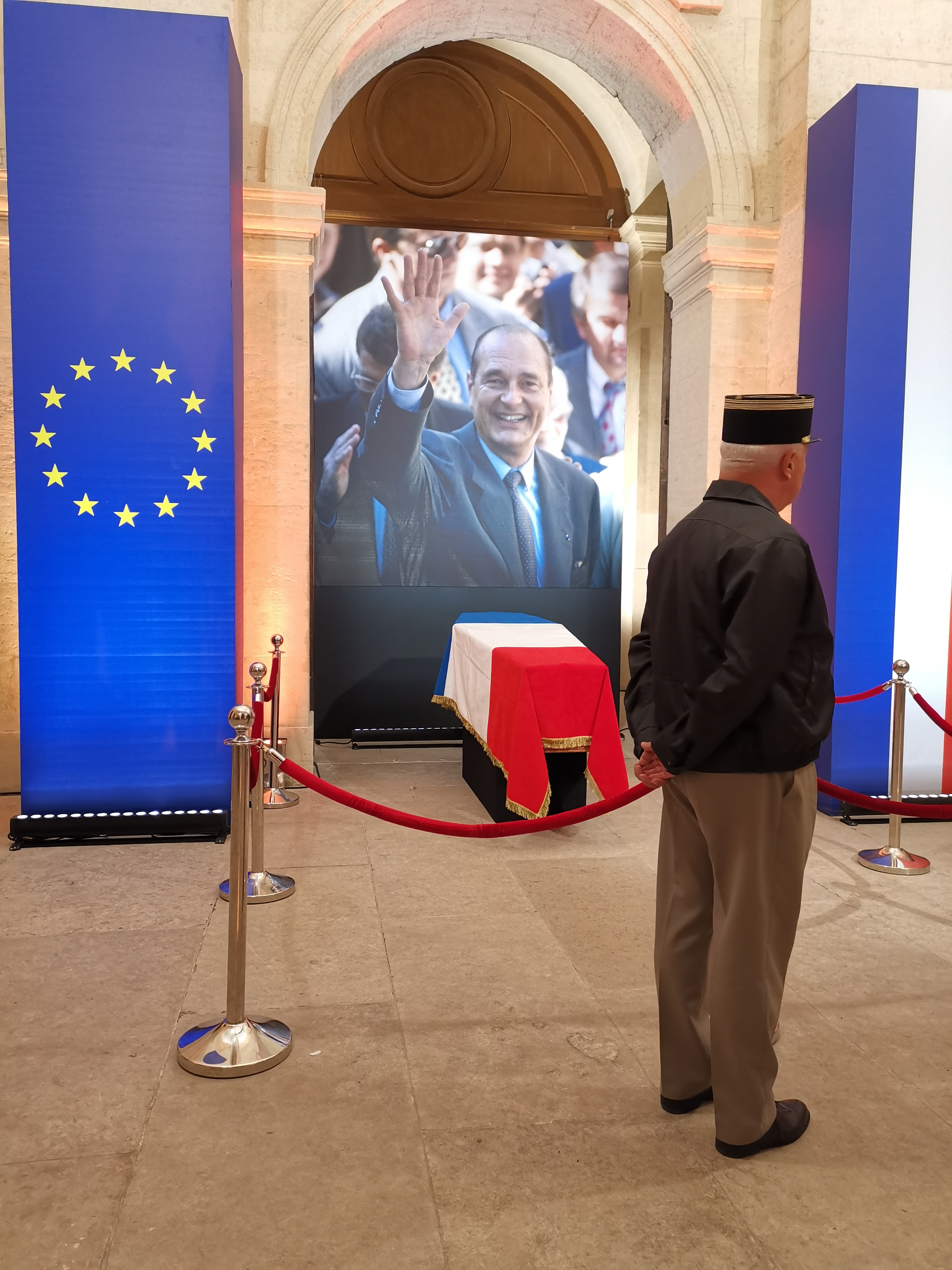
Lying-in-state of former president Jacques Chirac

State funerals (French: obsèques nationales) are awarded by decree of the President of the French Republic to especially eminent French personalities. They have been held for:

- Victor Hugo (1885)
- Pedro II of Brazil (Note: Brazilian national) (1891), Emperor of Brazil who died in exile in France
- Georges Coulon (1912)
- Maurice Barrès (1923)
- Gabriel Fauré (1924)
- Hubert Lyautey (1934)
- Charles Nollet (1940)
- Charles Huntziger (1940)
- Philippe Henriot (1944)
- Paul Valéry (1945)
- Jacques Leclerc (1947)
- Giraud (1949)
- Albert Lebrun (1951)
- Léon Blum (1951)
- de Lattre de Tassigny (1952)
- Colette (1954)
- Édouard Herriot (1957)
- Aimé Césaire (2008)
- Charles Aznavour (2018)
- Jacques Chirac (2019)

=== Italy ===
- General Carlo Alberto dalla Chiesa, his wife Emanuela Setti Carraro and agent Domenico Russo, assassinated by the Sicilian Mafia in 1982
- Giovanni Spadolini (1994)
- Giovanni Leone (2001)
- Carlo Azeglio Ciampi (2016)
- Silvio Berlusconi (2023)
- Arnaldo Forlani (2023)
- Giorgio Napolitano (2023)

=== Lithuania ===
- 26 June 2010 – Algirdas Brazauskas – president of Lithuania
- 6 October 2018 – Adolfas Ramanauskas-Vanagas – leader of the Lithuanian resistance.
- 22 November 2019 – Zygmunt Sierakowski, Konstanty Kalinowski – leaders of the Polish, Lithuanian and Belarusian national revival and the leader of the January Uprising in the lands of the former Grand Duchy of Lithuania in the Polish-Lithuanian Commonwealth, and other 18 partipaciants of the revival.

=== Malta ===
State funerals have been held for presidents, prime ministers and archbishops.

- The most recent state funeral held for a president of Malta was that of Ċensu Tabone in March 2012.
- The most recent state funeral held for a prime minister of Malta was that of Dom Mintoff in August 2012.

=== Netherlands ===
- The royal funerals of Queen Wilhelmina, Prince Claus, Queen Juliana and Prince Bernhard are the only royal funerals that were denoted state funerals; previous royal funerals were considered private affairs.
- The only non-royal Dutchman who is considered to have received a state funeral was Jo van Heutsz in 1927.
- Swedish ambassador Jens Malling was given a state funeral in The Hague on 30 January 1969.

=== North Macedonia ===
- Boris Trajkovski, second president of independent Macedonia (2004)
- Nikola Kljusev, first prime minister of independent Macedonia (2008)
- Singer Toše Proeski (2007)

=== Norway ===
- Haakon VII, king of Norway (1957)
- Olav V, king of Norway (1991)
- Harald V, king of Norway (2026)

=== Poland ===
- Lech Kaczyński, 4th President of Poland and his wife, Maria Kaczyńska (2010)

=== Portugal ===
A state funeral in Portugal is regulated by a Government decree, later promulgated by the president of the republic.

- King Carlos I of Portugal and Luís Filipe, Prince Royal of Portugal (1908)
- Sidónio Pais, 4th President of Portugal (1918)
- António Granjo, Prime Minister of Portugal (1921)
- João Pinheiro Chagas, Prime Minister of Portugal (1925)
- King Manuel II of Portugal (1932)
- Army Marshal Óscar Carmona, 11th president of Portugal (1951)
- Queen Amélie of Orléans (1951)
- Air Marshal Francisco Craveiro Lopes, 12th president of Portugal (1964)
- António de Oliveira Salazar, Prime Minister of Portugal (1970)
- Amália Rodrigues, fado singer (1999)
- Mário Soares, 17th president of Portugal (2017)
- Jorge Sampaio, 18th president of Portugal (2021)

=== Romania ===
- King Carol I (1914)
- Queen Marie (1938)
- King Michael I (2017)
- Ion Iliescu (2025)

=== Russia ===
==== Soviet Union ====
During the time of the Soviet Union (1917–1991), the state funerals of the most senior political and military leaders were staged as massive events with millions of mourners all over the USSR. The funerals of Vladimir Lenin, Joseph Stalin, Leonid Brezhnev, Yuri Andropov and Konstantin Chernenko all followed the same basic outline. They took place in Moscow, began with a public lying in state of the deceased in the House of the Unions and ended with an interment at the Red Square. The most notable examples of such state funerals during the Soviet period of Russian history are the ceremonies that were held for Lenin and Stalin, and for the death and funeral of Leonid Brezhnev.

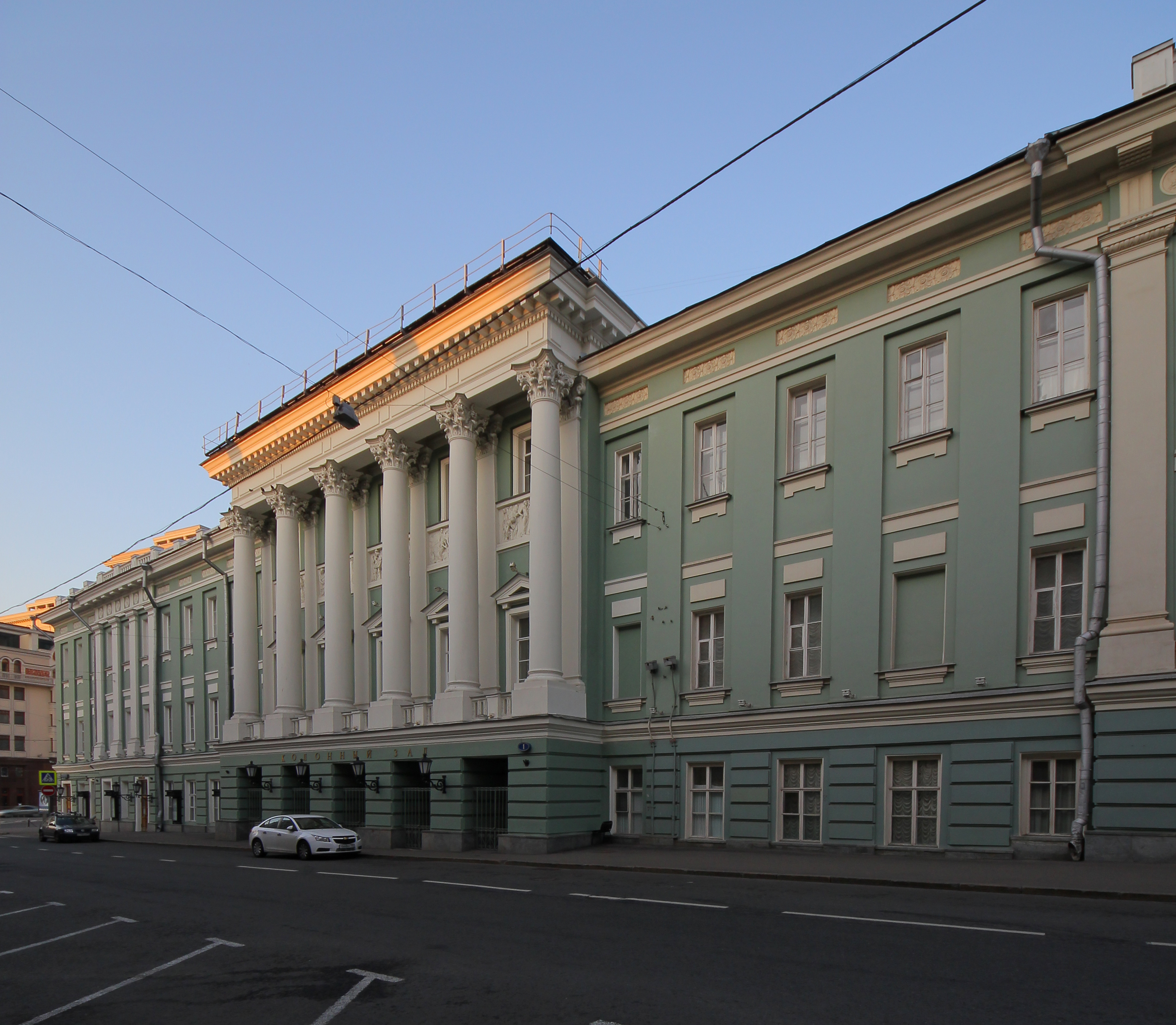
The House of the Unions in Moscow

In the second half of the 20th century, whenever a General Secretary of the Communist Party of the Soviet Union died, the event would first be officially acknowledged by Soviet radio and television. After several days of national mourning, the deceased would be given a state funeral and then buried. Soviet state funerals were often attended by foreign heads of state, heads of government, foreign ministers and other dignitaries from abroad. Following the death of General Secretary Leonid Brezhnev in 1982, there were five days of national mourning. Following the death of General Secretary Yuri Andropov in 1984, a four-day period of national mourning was announced.

The state funeral for a deceased General Secretary would be arranged, managed and prepared by a special committee of the Communist Party that would be formed for the occasion. As the funeral committee would normally be chaired by the deceased's successor, the preparations for Soviet state funerals were usually followed with great interest by foreign political scientists trying to gauge power shuffles within the Communist Party. The allocation of responsibilities during the funeral, appointment of pallbearers and positions within the order of precedence observed during the televised funeral ceremonies in Moscow could often be interpreted as a clue for the future position of Politburo members within the Party. When, after Brezhnev's death in 1982, Yuri Andropov was elected chairman of the committee in charge of Brezhnev's funeral, this was seen as a first sign by First World commentators that Andropov might be the most likely candidate for the position of General Secretary.

Prior to interment, the body of the deceased General Secretary would lie in state in the Pillar Hall of the House of the Unions which was decorated by numerous red flags and other communist symbols. The mourners, which usually would be brought in by the thousands, shuffled up a marble staircase beneath chandeliers draped in black gauze. On the stage at the left side of the Pillar Hall, amid a veritable garden of flowers, a full orchestra in black tailcoats would play classical music. The deceased's embalmed body, dressed in a black suit, white shirt and a tie, would be displayed in an open coffin on a catafalque banked with carnations, red roses and tulips, facing the long queue of mourners. A small guard of honour would be in attendance in the background. At the right side of the hall there would be placed seats for guests of honour, with the front row reserved for the dead leader's family.

On the day of the funeral, final ceremonies would be held at the Pillar Hall during which the lid of the coffin would be temporarily closed. The coffin would then be carried out of the House of the Unions and placed on a gun carriage drawn by a military vehicle. A funeral parade would then convey the coffin from the House of the Unions to the Red Square. Two officers led the funeral parade, carrying a large portrait of the deceased, followed by a group of numerous soldiers carrying red floral wreaths. A group of general officers would come next, carrying the late leader's decorations and medals on small red cushions. Behind them, the coffin rested atop a gun carriage. Walking immediately behind were the members of the deceased's family. The Politburo leaders, wearing red armbands, came next and led the last group of official mourners. At Brezhnev's funeral, the escort of official mourners included forty-four persons.

As the coffin reached the middle of the Red Square, it would be removed from the carriage and placed on a red-draped bier facing the Lenin Mausoleum, with its lid removed. After a series of funeral speeches, which were delivered by military and political leaders (typically including the deceased's successor as General Secretary, as well as 'ordinary' workers) from the balcony of the Lenin Mausoleum, the coffin would be carried in a procession around the mausoleum to the Kremlin Wall Necropolis just behind it. There, with the most senior mourners looking on, the coffin would be placed on a red-draped bier and the mourners would pay last respects. The coffin's lid would then be closed for the final time and the body lowered into the ground by two men, with handfuls of earth thrown onto the coffin by the senior mourners. The grave would be filled in immediately afterward, while the mourners were still present to watch. Gun salutes would be fired, sirens sounded around the Kremlin and the Soviet national anthem be played. This marked the end of the interment. The senior mourners would then return to the balcony of the Lenin Mausoleum to review a parade on Red Square while the military band would play quick marches. This concluded the state funeral.

With small deviations, the described protocol was roughly the same for the state funerals of Lenin, Stalin, Brezhnev, Yuri Andropov and Konstantin Chernenko. Lenin and Stalin were placed inside the Lenin Mausoleum while the others were interred in individual graves in the Kremlin Wall Necropolis located behind the mausoleum along the actual Kremlin wall. Stalin's body would lie beside Lenin's in the mausoleum until being moved to the Kremlin Wall Necropolis several years after his death.

==== Russian Federation ====
- In April 2007, the first president of Russia, Boris Yeltsin, was buried in a state funeral after a church ceremony at the Novodevichy Cemetery. He was the first Russian leader and head of state in 113 years to be buried in a church ceremony, after Emperor Alexander III of Russia. His funeral is the template for all state funerals held in Russia today, but with the addition of prayers at the moment of burial by representatives of the Orthodox Church.
- In November 2010, former prime minister Viktor Chernomyrdin was buried in a state funeral in a church ceremony at the Novodevichy Cemetery.
- In June 2015, former prime minister Yevgeny Primakov was buried in a state funeral in a church ceremony at the Novodevichy Cemetery.

=== Serbia ===
- In Belgrade (then the capital of the Socialist Federal Republic of Yugoslavia), a state funeral was held for Yugoslav leader Josip Broz Tito on 8 May 1980.

=== Slovakia ===
- A state funeral was held for the former president Michal Kováč in 2016.

==== Czechoslovakia ====
- Milan Rastislav Štefánik (1919)
- Rudolf Strechaj (1962)
- Alexander Dubček (1992)

=== Spain ===
- A state funeral was held for caudillo Francisco Franco in 1975.
- A state funeral was held for the former primer minister Adolfo Suarez in 2014.

=== Switzerland ===
- In 1960, the funeral procession of Henri Guisan gathered more than 120,000 people in Lausanne.

=== Sweden ===
==== State funerals since 1907 ====
- Oscar II (1907)
- Queen Sofia of Nassau (1913)
- Queen Victoria of Baden (1930)
- Prince Gustaf Adolf, Duke of Västerbotten (1947)
- Gustaf V (1950)
- Dag Hammarskjöld (1961)
- Queen Louise Mountbatten (1965)
- Gustaf VI Adolf (1973)
- Prince Bertil, Duke of Halland (1997)
- Princess Lilian, Duchess of Halland (2013)

==== Funerals with state elements ====
- Nathan Söderblom (1931)
- Prime Minister Olof Palme (1986)
- Astrid Lindgren (2002)

=== United Kingdom ===
- Queen Victoria in 1901
- Edward VII in 1910
- George V in 1936
- George VI in 1952
- Winston Churchill in 1965
- Elizabeth II in 2022

== Oceania ==
=== Australia ===
- Military state funerals are offered to former senior officers of the Australian Defence Force, for example Field Marshall Sir Thomas Blamey (1951)
- In rare occasions a Commonwealth state funeral is offered to people outside politics but who made a significant contribution to the nation, for example Sir Douglas Mawson was granted a Commonwealth state funeral in 1958.
- The Unknown Soldier was given a Commonwealth military state funeral on 11 November 1993, before being interred in the Hall of Memory at the Australian War Memorial.
- Bob Hawke (2019), former prime minister

==== New South Wales ====
Some former governors with military service, such as David Martin and Sir James Rowland, have received military state funerals.

- William Wentworth (6 May 1873), Statesman. The first state funeral in New South Wales.
- Rear Admiral Sir David Martin (17 August 1990), governor
- Fred Hollows (15 February 1993), ophthalmologist
- Air Marshal Sir James Rowland (2 June 1999), governor
- Slim Dusty (26 September 2003), country singer
- Johnny Warren (7 November 2004), footballer
- Bernie Banton (5 December 2007), campaigner for asbestos victims

==== Queensland ====
- R. M. Williams (13 November 2003), bushman and entrepreneur

==== Victoria ====
Victoria has held the most state funerals in Australia, including:

- Explorers Robert O'Hara Burke and William John Wills received Victoria's first (and Australia's second) state funeral on January 21, 1863.
- Peter Evans (1985), Broadcaster
- Ted Whitten (1995), Australian rules football player
- Peter Brock (2006), Race-car driver
- Charles 'Bud' Tingwell (2009), Actor
- Jim Stynes (2012), Australian Rules football player and charity worker
- Lou Richards (2017), Australian Rules football player and media personality
- Shane Warne (2022), Cricketer
- Judith Durham (2022), The Seekers' singer
- Olivia Newton-John (2022), Actress and singer
- Peter Reith (2022), Federal Politician
- Bob Maguire (2023), Catholic priest and community worker
- Barry Humphries (2023), Comedian and media personality
- Derryn Hinch (2026), Australian media personality, politician, actor, journalist and published author

==== South Australia ====
State funerals are generally offered to former governors, premiers, deputy premiers, speakers of the House of Assembly, chief justices and other senior public officials.

- Surveyor General Lieutenant Colonel William Light (1786–1839) received South Australia's, and Australia's, first state funeral on October 10, 1839.

==== Western Australia ====
The offer of a state funeral is a decision of the Cabinet.

- Arthur Leggett OAM (2025), Western Australia's oldest and last surviving World War II prisoner of war

==== Tasmania ====
State funerals are generally offered to former Governors, Premiers, Deputy Premiers, Speakers of the House of Assembly, Chief Justices and other senior public officials.

Sir Reginald (Reg) Charles Wright - 14 March 1990

==== Australian Capital Territory ====
The offer of a state funeral is at the discretion of the Chief Minister. People who have received state funerals include:

- Terry Connolly (2007), Supreme Court judge
- Trevor Kaine (2008), former chief minister
- Jim Pead (2009), former chairman of the Canberra Commercial Development Authority

=== Fiji ===
- Ratu Sir Kamisese Mara (2004), Chief Minister, Prime Minister, and President
- Ratu Josefa Iloilo (2010), President
- Ratu Joni Madraiwiwi (2016), vice-president, acting president, and Chief Justice of Nauru
- Ratu Tevita Momoedonu (2020), Prime Minister

=== Hawaiʻi ===
- Kalākaua (1891), King (Note: had two state funerals)
- Liliʻuokalani (1917), Queen, final monarch of the Kingdom of Hawaiʻi (Note: See Death and state funeral of Liliʻuokalani)

=== New Zealand ===
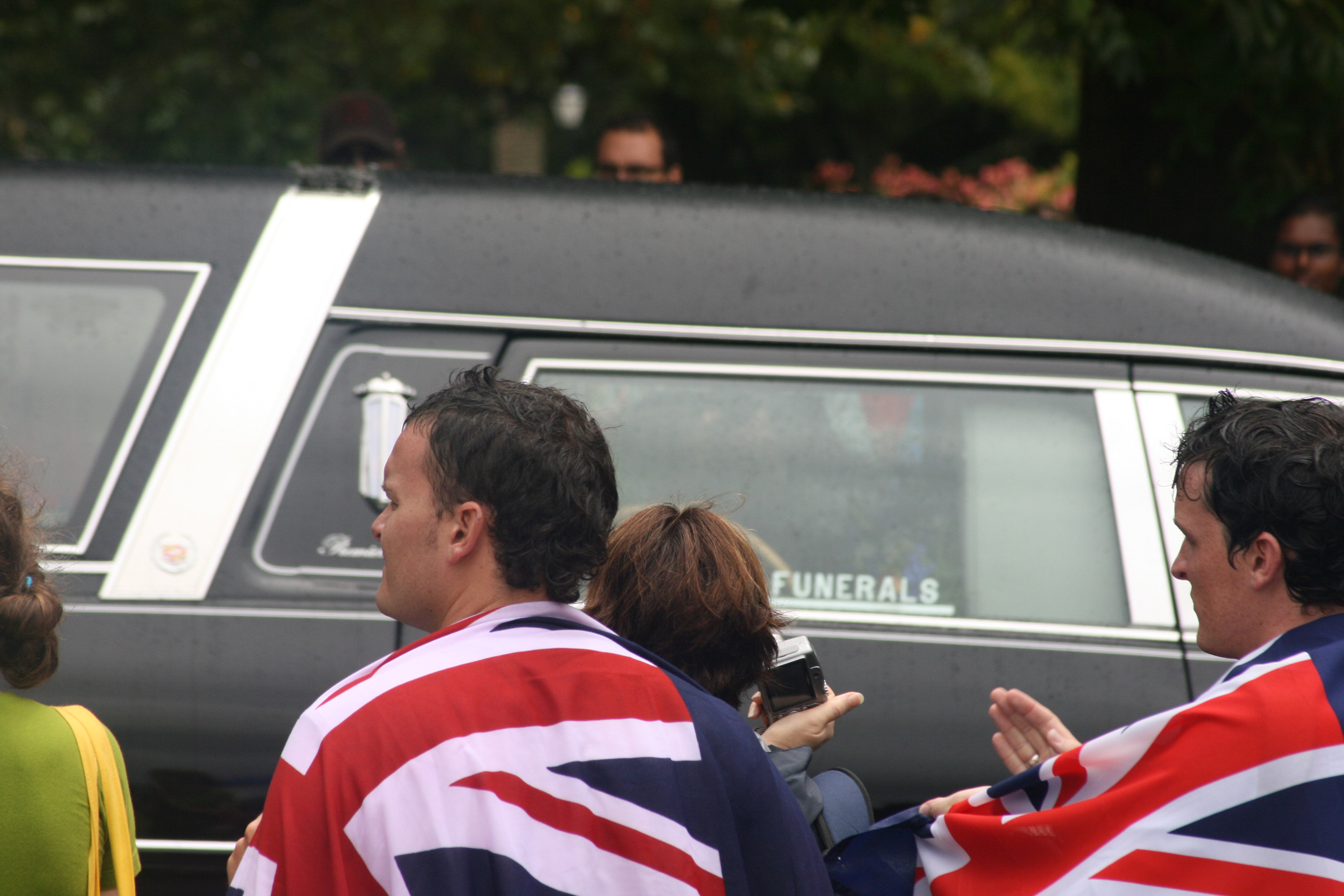
People draped in the New Zealand flag at the Auckland Domain as the hearse carrying Sir Edmund Hillary's coffin drives past during his state funeral

- John Ballance (30 April 1893), Premier
- Richard Seddon (21 June 1906), Premier
- Sir William Herries (1923), politician
- William Massey (14 May 1925), Prime Minister
- Sir Joseph Ward (9 July 1930), Prime Minister
- Harry Holland (1933), politician
- Sir Frederic Truby King (1937), health reformer
- Michael Joseph Savage (30 April 1940), Prime Minister
- Tim Armstrong (1942), politician
- Peter Fraser (16 December 1950), Prime Minister
- The unidentified victims of the Tangiwai rail disaster (31 December 1953)
- Sir Sidney Holland (1962), Prime Minister
- Sir Walter Nash (6 June 1968), Prime Minister
- Norman Kirk (4 September 1974), Prime Minister
- Sir Keith Holyoake (13 December 1983), Prime Minister
- Sir Robert Muldoon (7 February 1992), Prime Minister
- Charles Upham (25 November 1994), decorated soldier
- Jack Hinton (2 July 1997) decorated soldier
- The Unknown Warrior (reinterment 11 November 2004), representing all New Zealand soldiers who died in war
- Sir Edmund Hillary (22 January 2008), mountaineer, explorer, and philanthropist
- Sir Paul Reeves (18 Aug 2011), Governor-General

=== Samoa ===
- Faumuina Anapapa (2006), member of the Council of Deputies
- Malietoa Tanumafili II (2007), head of state
- Tuiloma Pule Lameko (2018), member of the Council of Deputies
- Jack Netzler (2022), politician

=== Tonga ===
- Prince Fatafehi Tuʻipelehake (1999)
- King Tāufaʻāhau Tupou IV (2006)
- King George Tupou V (2012)
- ʻAkilisi Pōhiva (2019)

== See also ==
- Abraham Lincoln's burial and exhumation
- "Black Jack"
- Burial at Sea
- Catafalque
- State funeral of Ali Khamenei
- Death and funeral of Corazon Aquino
- Death and funeral of Bhumibol Adulyadej
- Death and state funeral of Elizabeth II
- Death and state funeral of Edward VII
- Death and state funeral of Fidel Castro
- Death and state funeral of George H. W. Bush
- Death and state funeral of George V
- Death and state funeral of George VI
- Death and state funeral of Gerald Ford
- Death and state funeral of Harald V
- Death and funeral of Hassan II
- Death and funeral of Helmut Kohl
- Death and state funeral of Hussein of Jordan
- Death and state funeral of Josip Broz Tito
- Death and state funerals of Kalākaua
- Death and state funeral of Lech and Maria Kaczyński
- Death and state funeral of Leonid Brezhnev
- Death and state funeral of Liliʻuokalani
- Death and state funeral of Nelson Mandela
- Death and state funeral of Néstor Kirchner
- Death and state funeral of Omar Bongo
- Death and state funeral of Pierre Trudeau
- Death and state funeral of Queen Victoria
- Death and state funeral of Richard Nixon
- Death and state funeral of Ronald Reagan
- Death and state funeral of Ruhollah Khomeini
- Death and state funeral of Sebastián Piñera
- Funeral of Diana, Princess of Wales
- Funeral of Pope John Paul II
- Funeral of Pope Francis
