= Wamathai Samuel Githaiga =

Kenyan politician, 2nd Governor of Nyeri County

2nd Governor of Nyeri County
- In office 24 February 2017 – 11 August 2017
- Preceded by: Nderitu Gachagua
- Succeeded by: Wahome Gakuru

Personal details
- Born: 29 July 1951 (age 74) Muruguru, Nyeri
- Political party: Jubilee Party
- Education: University of Nairobi

Wamathai Samuel Githaiga is a Kenyan politician who served as the 2nd governor of Nyeri County He assumed office on 24 February 2017 after the death of Nderitu Gachagua. He served as deputy governor to Gachagua having been elected on a GNU party ticket in the 2013 Kenyan General elections. Wamathai assumed office as per the Governor succession act of the Kenyan Constitution.

Gachagua died while undergoing treatment at a London hospital, United Kingdom.

Born in Muruguru Village, Nyeri County. Githaiga is a graduate of the University of Nairobi and Massachusetts Institute of Technology.

Wamathai was defeated by Dr Wahome Gakuru in the 2017 general election and has since retired from active politics
