= Nderitu Gachagua =

Kenyan politician (1952–2017)

1st Governor of Nyeri County
- In office March 2013 – 24 February 2017
- Deputy: Wamathai Samuel Githaiga
- Preceded by: Position established
- Succeeded by: Wamathai Samuel

Member of Parliament for Mathira Constituency
- In office January 2003 – January 2007
- Preceded by: Eliud Matu Wamae
- Succeeded by: Ephraim Mwangi Maina

Personal details
- Born: 29 July 1952
- Died: 24 February 2017 (aged 64) London, United Kingdom
- Spouse: Margaret Nyokabi

James Nderitu Gachagua (29 July 1952 – 24 February 2017) was a Kenyan politician who served as the first governor of Nyeri County having been elected in March 2013 on a GNU party ticket alongside deputy governor, Wamathai Samwel Githaiga. Nderitu studied Building Economics at the University of Nairobi. Before becoming governor, he served as the Member of Parliament for Mathira constituency. He is the elder brother of former Deputy President of Kenya Rigathi Gachagua.

Gachagua died on 24 February 2017 at the Royal Marsden Hospital in London while undergoing treatment for pancreatic cancer.
