= Mutahi Kahiga =

Kenyan politician

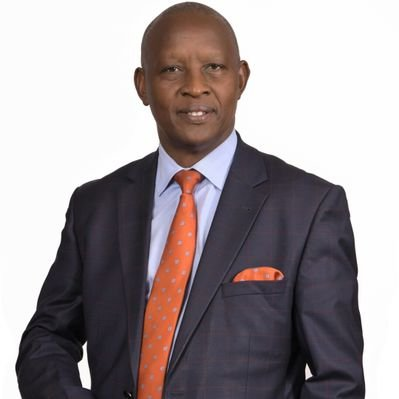

4th Governor of Nyeri County
- Incumbent
- Assumed office 13 November 2017
- Deputy: David Mwangi Kinaniri Waroe
- Preceded by: Wahome Gakuru

Personal details
- Education: Kenya Methodist University

Mutahi Kahiga is a Kenyan politician currently serving as the fourth governor of Nyeri County. Kahiga was elected as the Deputy Governor of Nyeri County in 2017 alongside the county's third Governor, Wahome Gakuru. He later ascended to the gubernatorial position following the demise of the incumbent governor Dr. Wahome Gakuru and took the oath of office on 13 November 2017. Kahiga was re-elected for a second term in the 2022 general elections under the United Democratic Alliance ticket.

Before venturing into politics, Kahiga had a teaching career spanning 32 years and served as an executive secretary in the Mount Kenya Branch of the Kenya National Union of Teachers. In 2024, he obtained a Doctorate Degree in Leadership and Education Management from the Kenya Methodist University.
