= Wahome Gakuru =

Kenyan politician (1966–2017)

3rd(2nd elected) Governor of Nyeri County
- In office 11 August 2017 – 7 November 2017
- Deputy: Mutahi Kahiga
- Preceded by: Wamathai Samuel Githaiga
- Succeeded by: Mutahi Kahiga

Personal details
- Born: 29 July 1966
- Died: 7 November 2017 (aged 51) Thika, Kiambu County
- Spouse: Catherine Wahome

Patrick Wahome Gakuru (29 July 1966 – 7 November 2017) was a Kenyan politician who served as the third governor of Nyeri County having been elected in August 2017 on a Jubilee party ticket alongside deputy governor, Mutahi Kahiga. Gakuru studied commerce at the University of Nairobi He had two Masters and a PhD from Arizona State University, USA, a Master of Business Administration (MBA) from Willamette University, USA majoring in strategy, MBA from the University of Nairobi, Kenya majoring in Marketing and a Bachelor of Commerce (Honors) from University of Nairobi.

Gakuru died at Thika level 5 hospital on 7 November 2017 after a road accident at Kabati near Kenol along the Thika- Murang'a road. The cause of the accident was attributed to a burst tire.

As per law, Gakuru was succeeded by his deputy, Mutahi Kahiga who took oath of office on 13 November 2017.
