= Death and state funeral of Manoj Kumar =

Death and state funeral of Indian actor Manoj Kumar

The Indian actor Manoj Kumar died on 4 April 2025, following a prolonged illness. He was 87 years old and widely revered for his contribution to Indian cinema, particularly for his patriotic roles that earned him the nickname Bharat Kumar. The Indian government accorded him a full state funeral on 5 April 2025, marking his significance in national culture.

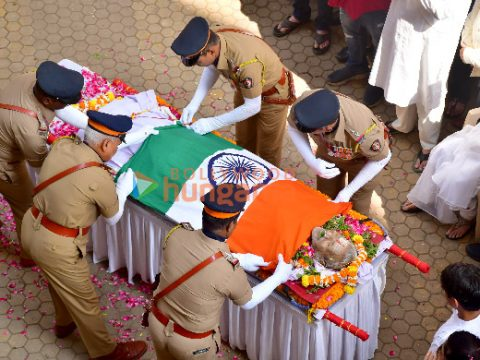

== Death ==
Manoj Kumar died on 4 April 2025 at Kokilaben Dhirubhai Ambani Hospital in Mumbai, India. He had been suffering from chronic heart-related complications and decompensated liver cirrhosis, which had progressively worsened. His son, Kunal Goswami, confirmed the news of his passing.

== Reactions ==
Following the death of Manoj Kumar, several prominent political leaders and film personalities paid tribute to the veteran actor and filmmaker.

=== Political leaders ===
- Prime Minister of India Narendra Modi expressed grief on X (formerly Twitter), stating: "Shri Manoj Kumar Ji’s contribution to Indian cinema was truly inspiring. He made many patriotic films that ignited the feeling of pride in our nation. His works continue to inspire generations. Condolences to his family and admirers. Om Shanti."
- President Droupadi Murmu also conveyed her condolences and praised Manoj Kumar’s immense contribution to Indian cinema and national sentiment.
- Union Home Minister Amit Shah remembered Manoj Kumar for his role in portraying India's cultural and patriotic values through cinema.
- External Affairs Minister S. Jaishankar tweeted: "Manoj Kumar Ji’s storytelling through films deeply resonated with India’s image abroad. A cultural ambassador in his own right."
- Congress leader Rahul Gandhi expressed his condolences stating, "Manoj Kumar Ji left an indelible mark on Indian cinema. Through his films, he brought patriotism and pressing social issues to the forefront in a manner that touched the hearts of millions."

=== Foreign reactions ===
- The Embassy of France in India tweeted condolences, recognizing Manoj Kumar’s legacy in cinema and his contribution to Indo-French cultural ties.
- The BBC published a special obituary honoring Manoj Kumar’s influence in patriotic cinema, calling him "the face of nationalistic storytelling in Indian film."
- The New York Times referred to him as "India’s original cinematic patriot" and reflected on his films' impact beyond the subcontinent.

=== Bollywood personalities ===
- Akshay Kumar wrote on X: "Grew up watching Manoj Kumar Ji's patriotic films. His movies deeply influenced my sense of national pride. Deeply saddened by his passing."
- Ajay Devgn tweeted: "I’ll always be grateful to Manoj Kumar Ji for giving my father his first major break in 'Roti Kapda Aur Makaan'. His contribution to Indian cinema is unparalleled."
- Aamir Khan stated: "Manoj Kumar Ji was not just a filmmaker, but an institution in himself. His vision of patriotism inspired an entire generation."
- Actress and BJP MP Hema Malini expressed her grief, stating, "Since morning, I have been feeling very sad. The news of Manoj ji's passing has left me deeply emotional." She fondly recalled her work with him and highlighted how he maintained respect for his co-stars, saying, "He would never touch the heroine in romantic scenes."
- Veteran actress Saira Banu paid tribute to Manoj Kumar by remembering his deep admiration for her late husband, Dilip Kumar. She said, "Manoj was more than a colleague; he was family. He would often visit us to talk about cinema and share stories. Their bond was heartwarming." She also mentioned how they shared food, festivals, and memories beyond films.
- Multiple Bollywood celebrities including Amitabh Bachchan, Salim Khan, and others attended his funeral in Mumbai which was conducted with state honors.

== State funeral ==
In recognition of his contributions to Indian cinema, Manoj Kumar was given a state funeral by the Government of India. His mortal remains were draped in the Indian national flag, and a police unit gave a three-volley gun salute at the cremation site, Pawan Hans Crematorium, Mumbai. The last rites commenced at approximately 11:30 am, with his sons, Vishal and Kunal, lighting the funeral pyre.

== Attendance and tributes ==
Prominent film personalities attended the funeral to pay their last respects. Actors Amitabh Bachchan and Abhishek Bachchan were present, along with Salim Khan, Arbaaz Khan, Prem Chopra, Anu Malik, Zayed Khan, Rajpal Yadav, Ranjeet, and Sunil Darshan. Tributes poured in from across the country, with political leaders and film stars expressing their grief and recalling his legacy.

A prayer meeting was held on 6 April 2025 at J.W. Marriott Hotel in Juhu, Mumbai, attended by numerous Bollywood celebrities who gathered to honor his memory.

== Legacy ==
Manoj Kumar was born as Harikrishan Giri Goswami on 24 July 1937 in Abbottabad, British India (now in Pakistan). He was best known for his roles in patriotic films like Shaheed (1965), Upkar (1967), Purab Aur Paschim (1970), and Roti Kapda Aur Makaan (1974). His portrayal of nationalistic themes earned him the affectionate title of Bharat Kumar.

His accolades include:

- Padma Shri in 1992
- Filmfare Lifetime Achievement Award in 1999
- Dadasaheb Phalke Award in 2015
