= Death and state funeral of Manmohan Singh =

2024 death of former Indian prime minister

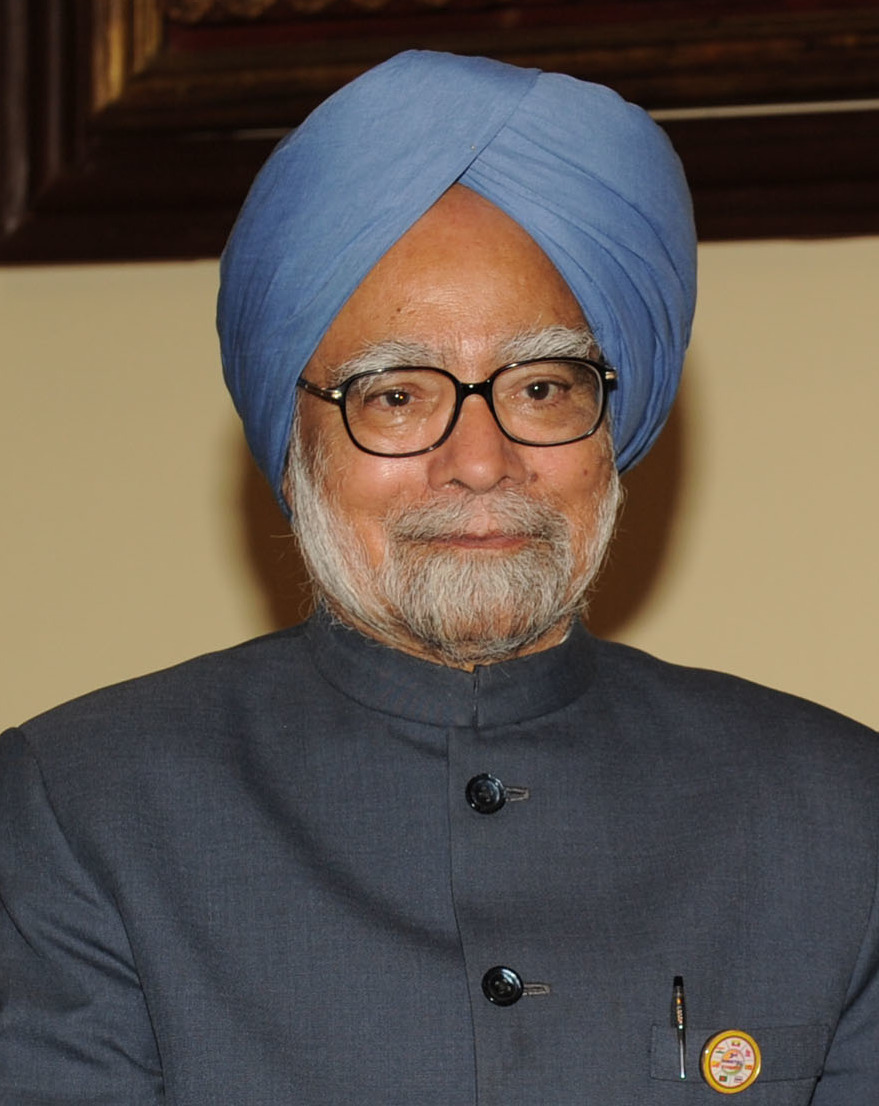
- Singh in March 2014 two months before leaving office as prime minister
- Date: 26 December 2024 (death); 28 December 2024 (state funeral)
- Location: AIIMS, Delhi (death) Nigambodh Ghat, Delhi (state funeral)

On 26 December 2024, Manmohan Singh, the 13th prime minister of India and 24th minister of finance, died due to various health complications at the age of 92. Following his death, the Government of India announced a nationwide seven-day state mourning period until 1 January 2025. He was given a state funeral on 28 December 2024. His lying in state occurred at the All India Congress Committee headquarters in Delhi.

== Background ==
Singh, a chronic diabetic, underwent two cardiac bypass surgeries, the latter of which took place in January 2009, when he was the prime minister. He also suffered from prostate enlargement, for which he underwent surgery in September 2007.

In May 2020, Singh was hospitalised at the All India Institute of Medical Sciences (AIIMS) due to a negative reaction to some new medication. In April 2021, Singh was hospitalised after testing positive for COVID-19. In October 2021, Singh was hospitalised again at the AIIMS after experiencing weakness and fever.

== Death and subsequent events ==
In the evening of 26 December 2024, Singh collapsed at his home in New Delhi and was admitted to the emergency department of All India Institute of Medical Sciences, Delhi. He died a few hours after his hospitalisation at the age of 92. The official statement by AIIMS stated that Singh died at 9:51 pm, after being treated for age-related illnesses and "had sudden loss of consciousness at home" earlier that day.

Following his death, the Government of India declared seven days of state mourning throughout India from 26 December to 1 January, both days inclusive, with flags at half mast throughout India during the period of state mourning. The government also announced that Singh will be accorded a state funeral.

On 27 December, the Union Cabinet, chaired by Prime Minister Narendra Modi, passed a Condolence Resolution in the memory of Singh. The Cabinet also observed a two-minute silence. The resolution read, in part:

Dr. Manmohan Singh has left his imprint on our national life. In his passing away, the Nation has lost an eminent statesman, renowned economist and a distinguished leader.

Further, it was announced by the president's secretariat that the change of guard ceremony at Rashtrapati Bhavan on 28 December will not take place due to national mourning.

== State funeral ==
The state funeral for Manmohan Singh occurred in New Delhi on 28 December 2024. His eldest daughter lit the funeral pyre at the crematorium in front of President Droupadi Murmu, Vice President Jagdeep Dhankhar, Prime Minister Narendra Modi, and senior members of Singh's Congress Party. Foreign dignitaries such as the King of Bhutan Jigme Khesar Namgyel Wangchuck and Mauritius Foreign Minister Ritish Ramful were also in attendance. Singh received full state honours in a ceremony that included a 21-gun salute.

== Reactions ==
=== India ===
India:

- President Droupadi Murmu said: "He will always be remembered for his service to the nation, his unblemished political life and his utmost humility. His passing is a great loss to all of us. I pay my respectful homage to one of the greatest sons of Bharat and convey my heartfelt condolences to his family, friends and admirers".
- Vice President Jagdeep Dhankhar said he was "deeply pained" to learn about Singh's death. He hailed Singh as "a distinguished economist who transformed India's economic landscape". "A Padma Vibhushan awardee and architect of India's economic liberalisation in 1991, he boldly steered our nation through a critical transition, opening new pathways for growth and prosperity", the vice-president added.
- Prime Minister Narendra Modi wrote on X: "India mourns the loss of one of its most distinguished leaders, Dr. Manmohan Singh Ji. Rising from humble origins, he rose to become a respected economist. He served in various government positions as well, including as Finance Minister, leaving a strong imprint on our economic policy over the years. His interventions in Parliament were also insightful. As our Prime Minister, he made extensive efforts to improve people's lives". On 27 December, Modi paid tribute to Singh in a video message, saying: "His commitment to the people and the nation's development will forever be held in high regard. Dr. Manmohan Singh ji's life was a reflection of honesty and simplicity. He was an extraordinary parliamentarian. His humility, gentleness, and intellect defined his parliamentary life".
- Former prime minister H.D. Deve Gowda said: "[Manmohan was a] simple and honest man". Gowda became the only living former prime minister of India following Singh's death.
- Union Home Minister and Minister of Cooperation Amit Shah expressed deep grief over Singh's death and said that "from being Governor of the Reserve Bank of India to Finance Minister of the country and Prime Minister, Dr. Manmohan Singh ji played an important role in the governance of the country".
- Union Commerce Minister Nirmala Sitharaman called him: "Soft-spoken and gentle."

=== International ===
Not many people know this, and it is time that I share it with Malaysians: during the years of my incarceration, he extended a kindness that he didn't have to – one that was neither politically expedient nor, as one can imagine, appreciated by the Malaysian government at that time. Yet, true to his character, he did it anyway. He offered scholarships for my children, particularly my son, Ihsan. Although I had declined the gracious offer, such a gesture undoubtedly showed his extraordinary humanity and generosity, demonstrative, as the Bard would have it, of a man so full of the "milk of human kindness".

— Anwar Ibrahim, Prime Minister of Malaysia, paying tribute to Manmohan Singh

Several countries sent condolences.

- Afghanistan: Former president Hamid Karzai said: "India has lost one of its most illustrious sons". He described Singh as "an unwavering ally and friend to the people of Afghanistan".
- Bangladesh: Chief Adviser Muhammad Yunus conveyed his "profound grief and deep condolences" over the demise of Manmohan Singh, calling him a "close friend". Yunus described Singh as "a person of great humility, a visionary leader, a statesman, who was known for his unwavering commitment to ensuring the welfare of the people of India". Yunus also recalled a congratulatory message he received from Singh after winning the Nobel Peace Prize in October 2006. On 31 December 2024, he visited the Indian High Commission in Dhaka and paid floral tributes to Singh.
- Brazil: President Luiz Inácio Lula da Silva said he and Singh "were government contemporaries in the first decade of the 21st century and we worked together to grow relations between our countries and build a fairer world". "Singh participated in the creation of IBSA, bringing together Brazil, South Africa and India, and in the founding of BRICS. In 2012, when I was no longer president, we met in New Delhi and talked a lot about development, combating poverty and hunger, and cooperation in the Global South," he said.
- Bhutan:
  - Prime Minister Tshering Tobgay described Singh as "a remarkable statesman and a cherished friend of Bhutan", whose "wisdom, compassion, and leadership touched many lives, and also strengthened the bond between our two countries". He added, "India's loss is immense, and his legacy will remain in our hearts forever".
  - The king of Bhutan, the Fourth Druk Gyalpo and the queen mothers offered prayers and butterlamps at the Kuenray of Tashichhodzong for Manmohan Singh on 27 December. Similar prayer ceremonies were also held across all 20 Dzongkhags. Additionally, all Bhutanese flags across the country and at Bhutan's embassies, missions, and consulates abroad were flown at half-mast.
  - The king of Bhutan was also in attendance at Singh's state funeral in New Delhi.
- Canada:
  - Prime Minister Justin Trudeau said: "Manmohan Singh's passing is a loss for India and the world. As one of its longest-serving leaders, he transformed the country's economy, lifted millions out of poverty, and built strong bridges with the world — including Canada."
  - Former prime minister Stephen Harper said: "I am saddened to learn of the passing of my former colleague, Prime Minister Manmohan Singh. He was an individual of exceptional intelligence, integrity, and wisdom".
- China:
  - Foreign Ministry of China spokesperson Mao Ning said: "Mr. Singh, a senior statesman and renowned economist, will be remembered for his vital contribution to closer China-India ties. As India's Prime Minister, he oversaw the establishment of China-India strategic and cooperative partnership for peace and prosperity and the agreement on the political parameters and guiding principles for the settlement of the boundary question. We mourn for his passing and extend sincere condolences to his family and the government and people of India."
  - Chinese ambassador to India Xu Feihong said: "Deeply saddened by the passing of former Indian Prime Minister Dr. Manmohan Singh, an outstanding leader who is widely revered by the Indian people. Heartfelt condolences to his family and loved ones."
- France: President Emmanuel Macron said: "India has lost a great man, and France a friend, in the person of Dr. Manmohan Singh. He had dedicated his life to his country. Our thoughts are with his family and the people of India."
- Iran: President Masoud Pezeshkian offered his condolences, describing Singh as "a great leader for India and a great supporter of relations between the two nations of Iran and India".
- Japan: Prime Minister Shigeru Ishiba, and Minister for Foreign Affairs Takeshi Iwaya, respectively sent letters of condolences to Indian prime minister Narendra Modi, and Minister of External Affairs of India Subrahmanyam Jaishankar, expressing "sincere condolences" and paying tribute to Manmohan Singh for "his endeavors which built the foundation for the development of Japan-India relations of today".
- Malaysia: Prime Minister Anwar Ibrahim paid tribute to Singh describing him as "my mitra, my bhai". He said: "Obituaries, essays and books a plenty there will surely be about this great man, celebrating him as the architect of India’s economic reforms. As Prime Minister, Dr Manmohan Singh was the midwife of India's emergence as one of the world's economic giants". Ibrahim also shared a personal anecdote involving Singh's offer of scholarships for his children during his imprisonment.
- Maldives: President Mohamed Muizzu sent condolences and said "On behalf of Maldivian people and myself, I join the people of India in mourning the passing of former Prime Minister Dr. Manmohan Singh".
- Mauritius:
  - Prime Minister Navin Ramgoolam said: "It is with profound sadness that I have just learnt of the passing away of Dr. Manmohan Singh, former Prime Minister of India. I first met him when I was Leader of the opposition and he came to Mauritius on an official visit, prior to the 2005 election. Dr. Manmohan Singh was a gentleman politician and an eminent economist, who transformed India's economic landscape. His humility, integrity & calmness will always be remembered."
  - Minister of Foreign Affairs Ritish Ramful said: "The former prime minister was a very close friend of the people of Mauritius during his terms of office, between 2004 to 2014. During that term, he had always done his best to promote this special relationship, this special bond between the two nations." Ramful was also in attendance at Singh's state funeral in New Delhi.
  - The Mauritian government announced that all flags would be flown at half-mast on all government buildings until sunset on the day of Singh's funeral.
- Nepal: Prime Minister KP Sharma Oli called Singh "a visionary leader", whose "wisdom, humility, and dedication shaped India and inspired the region". He added, "Nepal will forever remember his support for democracy and lasting friendship".
- Pakistan:
  - Deputy Prime Minister and Foreign Minister Ishaq Dar said, "Born in a village in Pakistan's Chakwal district, Dr. Singh was a distinguished economist and political leader. He will be remembered for his wisdom and gentle demeanor". Dar noted that Singh "played a notable role in improving Pakistan-India bilateral relations during his tenure as Prime Minister". He added, "The people and the Government Pakistan extend their heartfelt condolences to Dr. Manmohan Singh’s family, and to the people and the Government of India".
  - Former foreign minister Khurshid Mahmud Kasuri said that Singh "will be remembered in history as a man who devoted himself to the improvement of bilateral relations between the two countries". Kasuri credited Singh for the creation of "a congenial atmosphere" in the entire SAARC region, and said Singh looked forward to the day when it would be possible to have "breakfast in Amritsar, lunch in Lahore, and dinner in Kabul".
- Palestine:
  - President Mahmoud Abbas sent letters of condolence to Indian prime minister Narendra Modi and Congress President Mallikarjun Kharge. Abbas described Singh as "a distinguished leader who dedicated years of service to his country and its people".
  - Abed Elrazeg Abu Jazer, the chargé d'affaires of the Palestine embassy in India, appreciated Singh's support for Palestine and his role in allocating land for the Palestinian embassy in Delhi. He also laid a wreath on behalf of the president of Palestine.
- Portugal: Prime Minister Luis Montenegro said: "I deeply regret the passing away of former Prime Minister of India Manmohan Singh. A life dedicated to his country, a reference in the international concert of nations. The Government of Portugal offers its condolences to the family and the Indian people."
- Russia: President Vladimir Putin offered his condolences to President Droupadi Murmu and Prime Minister Narendra Modi on Singh's death, describing him as "an outstanding statesman". Putin said, "As prime minister and when serving in other high-ranking positions, he accomplished a lot in promoting India's economic development and asserting its interests on the world stage". "I had the occasion of talking with this remarkable man several times. We will cherish the memory of him," he added.
- Saudi Arabia: King Salman bin Abdulaziz Al Saud sent condolence to President Droupadi Murmu on Singh's death and expressed his "deepest condolences and sincere sympathy to the Indian President, the family of the deceased, and the friendly people of India."
- Seychelles: In his message of condolence, President Wavel Ramkalawan commented Singh's "efforts to enhance India’s diplomatic ties with several countries, including Seychelles, and for establishing economic partnerships that have immensely benefited India’s global position".
- Singapore:
  - Prime Minister Lawrence Wong sent a letter of condolence to Indian prime minister Narendra Modi, in which he said, "Dr Singh was a statesman who reshaped and liberalised India’s economy through his vision and determination. This set the stage for India’s remarkable growth and emergence as a key regional and global player".
  - Simon Wong, Singaporean High Commissioner to India, described Singh as "a statesman whose wisdom and leadership shaped India’s growth", and who "played a pivotal role in developing our bilateral relations".
- Sri Lanka:
  - President Anura Kumara Dissanayake described Singh as "a visionary leader", whose "influence transcended national boundaries". Dissanayake said, "A tireless advocate of international collaboration, he forged lasting alliances, contributed to coalitions like BRICS, and showcased remarkable diplomacy through achievements such as the Indo-US nuclear agreement".
  - Former president Ranil Wickremesinghe said: "Late Prime Minister Singh assisted Sri Lanka in its war against the LTTE terrorism. He is remembered for the Indian-funded project to provide 50,000 houses for the Sri Lankans in the areas which were affected by war. During his tenure as the Prime Minister assisted Sri Lanka in resolving humanitarian and human rights issues. Therefore, his death is a loss for Sri Lanka as well."
- Tibet: The Dalai Lama expressed his sadness and offered condolences, and said: "Whenever we met over the years I deeply appreciated his concern and good counsel. I felt he was like an elder brother to me... He was also a good friend to the Tibetan people".
- United Kingdom:
  - Foreign Secretary David Lammy said: "Dr Manmohan Singh’s bold economic reforms transformed India’s economy. His legacy continues to shape modern India, and his vision laid the foundations for today’s thriving UK-India partnership."
  - Former prime minister Sir Tony Blair offered his condolences to Singh's family, and said: "He was the kindest, most gentle and unassuming political leader I ever met, but also one of the most clever. He was a true servant of India and the world, and deserves a place of honour in the history of both".
  - Former prime minister Gordon Brown said he was saddened to learn about Singh's death, crediting him as a friend and for his efforts during the 2008 financial crisis.
- United States:
  - President Joe Biden said: "He was a true statesman. A dedicated public servant. And above all, he was a kind and humble person". He added, "During this difficult time, we recommit to this vision to which Prime Minister Singh dedicated his life".
  - Secretary of State Antony Blinken offered condolences on behalf of the United States, and said, "We mourn Dr. Singh’s passing and will always remember his dedication to bringing the United States and India closer together".
- Venezuela: The Venezuelan government led by Nicolás Maduro recognized Singh for significantly transforming the country through creating and promoting economic reforms. They also said he left "an indelible legacy" on boosting on developing and modernizing India as a "visionary leader".

== Memorial ==
The Government of India announced that a trust will be formed for a memorial to Manmohan Singh, following which space will be allocated for it.

== See also ==
- List of awards and honours received by Manmohan Singh
