= List of national days of mourning (before 2000) =

This is a list of national days of mourning before 2000. It does not include annual remembrance events.

== 17th century ==
Country	Year	Days	Reason	Notes
Portugal	1649	2	Death of Eduardo de Bragança	First known national mourning declaration in history.
Portugal	1653	30	Death of Teodósio, Prince of Brazil	
Portugal	1656–1658	730	Death of King John IV of Portugal	2 years of mourning (1 year full mourning, 1 year half mourning).
Portugal	1666–1668	730	Death of Queen-consort Luisa de Guzmán	2 years of mourning (1 year full mourning, 1 year half mourning).
Portugal	1690–1691	365	Death of Isabel Luísa, Princess of Beira	One year of mourning (6 months full mourning, 6 months half mourning).

== 18th century ==
Country	Year	Days	Reason	Notes
Portugal	1706	365	Death of Catherine of Braganza, Queen-consort of England, Scotland and Ireland and Infanta of Portugal	
Portugal	1706–1708	730	Death of King Peter II of Portugal	2 years of mourning (1 year full mourning, 1 year half mourning).
United Kingdom	1714-1715	365	Death of Queen Anne, Queen of Great Britain	First national mourning period that was not from Portugal
Portugal	1750–1752	730	Death of King John V of Portugal	2 years of mourning (1 year full mourning, 1 year half mourning).
Portugal	1754–1755	180	Death of Queen-consort Maria Anna of Austria	
Portugal	1777–1778	365	Death of King Joseph I of Portugal	1 year of mourning (6 months full mourning, 6 months half mourning).
Portugal	1781	180	Death of Queen-consort Mariana Victoria of Spain	6 months of mourning (3 months full mourning, 3 months half mourning).
Portugal	1786–1787	365	Death of King-consort Peter III of Portugal	One year of mourning (6 months full mourning, 6 months half mourning).
Portugal	1788–1789	180	Death of José, Prince of Brazil	
United States	1799	69	Death of first president of the United States George Washington	
First French Empire	1799	10	Death of first president of the United States George Washington	second national mourning declaration that was not from Portugal.

== 19th century ==
Country	Year	Days	Reason	Notes
Portugal	1816–1817	365	Death of Queen Maria I of Portugal	One year of mourning (6 months full mourning, 6 months half mourning).
Portugal	1826–1827	365	Death of King John VI of Portugal	
Portugal	1830	180	Death of Queen-consort Carlota Joaquina of Spain	
Portugal	1834–1835	180	Death of King Peter IV of Portugal	
Mexico	1843	3	Death of first president Guadalupe Victoria	First time national mourning was declared by a country in the Americas.
Portugal	1853–1854	180	Death of Queen Maria II of Portugal	6 months of mourning (3 months full mourning, 3 months half mourning).
Italy	1861	1	Death of PM of Italy Camillo Benso, Count of Cavour	First Italian national mourning declaration.
Portugal	1861–1862	180	Death of King Peter V of Portugal	6 months of mourning (3 months full mourning, 3 months half mourning).
United States	1865	1	Assassination of U.S. President Abraham Lincoln	A National Day of Mourning was held on June 1. First American national mourning declaration.
Austria-Hungary	1871	30	Death of Princess Ludwig August of Saxe-Coburg and Gotha (née Princess Leopoldina of Brazil)	
Bolivia	1874	At least 1	Death of president Adolfo Ballivián	First time national mourning was declared by a South American country.
United States	1881	1	Death of U.S. President James A. Garfield	National mourning on September 26.
Guatemala	1885	30	Death of president Justo Rufino Barrios	
German Empire	1888	At least 1	Death of German Emperor William I	First German national mourning declaration.
El Salvador	1889	1	Death of Juan Montalvo	
Portugal	1889–1890	90	Death of King Luís I of Portugal	3 months of mourning (1.5 month full mourning, 1.5 month half mourning).
Netherlands	1890	1	Death of King William III	First Dutch national mourning declaration.
Bolivia	1899	2	Death of Juan M. Fernandez De Cordova	National mourning on March 16–17.
Bolivia	1899	At least 1	Death of presidential candidate Eliodoro Camacho	

== 20th century ==
=== 1900s ===
Country	Year	Days	Reason	Notes
Bolivia	1900	1	Death of Napoleón Tejada	National mourning on October 1.
United Kingdom	1901	11	Death of Queen Victoria	State funeral on February 2, 1901. Flags were hoisted to half-mast for the duration of the mourning period. This was the first mourning period to be observed in the UK.
Canada	1901	1	Death of Queen Victoria	During the first declaration of mourning in Canada on February 2, all places of business and entertainment were closed until the hour of sunset.
United States	1901	1	Assassination of U.S. President William McKinley	National mourning on September 19.
Bolivia	1901	1	Death of Manuel María Saavedra	National mourning on December 21.
Bolivia	1902	1	Death of deputy of Cochabamba Fabio Mariscal	National mourning on August 14.
Portugal	1908	120	Victims of the Lisbon Regicide	4 months of mourning (2 months full mourning, 2 months half mourning).
Cuba	1908	At least 2	Death of first president Tomás Estrada Palma	
Panama	1909	1	Death of first president Manuel Amador Guerrero	First time national mourning was declared in Panama.

=== 1910s ===
Country	Year	Days	Reason	Notes
Portugal	1910	30	Death of British King Edward VII	15 days full mourning, 15 days half mourning.
Bolivia	1910	1	Death of Feliciano Abastoflor	National mourning on August 30.
Mexico	1913	1	Death of José María Pino Suárez	
Bolivia	1915	1	Death of Demetrio Gutiérrez	National mourning on September 16.
Nicaragua	1917	1	Death of Francisco Baca	First time national mourning was declared in Nicaragua.
Bolivia	1918	1	Death of John D. O’Rear	National mourning on July 23 with flags at half mast.
Guatemala	1919	1	Death of former U.S president Theodore Roosevelt	
Cuba	1919	1	Death of former U.S president Theodore Roosevelt	
Germany	1919	7	Provisions of the Treaty of Versailles	All public amusements and sports were postponed or cancelled entirely.
Paraguay	1919	3	Death of president Manuel Franco	National mourning starting on June 6.

=== 1920s ===
Country	Year	Days	Reason	Notes
Bulgaria	1920	3	Provisions of the Treaty of Neuilly-sur-Seine	
Kingdom of Serbs, Croats and Slovenes	1921	At least 1	Death of King Peter I of Serbs, Croats, and Slovenes	Mourning started on August 17. First time national mourning was declared in Yugoslavia.
El Salvador	1921	3	Death of former president Rafael Antonio Gutiérrez	First time national mourning was declared in El Salvador.
Panama	1921	30	Victims of the Coto War	
Peru	1922	1	Death of Pope Benedict XV	
Germany	1922	At least 1	Assassination of German Foreign Minister Walther Rathenau	
United States	1923	1	Death of U.S. President Warren G. Harding	
Peru	1923	1	Death of U.S. President Warren G. Harding	The day of the U.S. President’s funeral has been declared a day of national mourning. National flags are flown at half-mast.
Portugal	1923	1	Death of Guerra Junqueiro	
Soviet Union	1924	1	Death of Soviet leader Vladimir Lenin	First time national mourning was announced in the Soviet Union.
Portugal	1924	1	Death of Teófilo Braga	
Poland	1924	At least 1	Death of former U.S. President Woodrow Wilson	First Polish national mourning declaration. Wilson called for an independent Polish state in his 1918 Fourteen Points statement.
Portugal	1924	1	Death of Sacadura Cabral	
Germany	1925	At least 5	Death of President Friedrich Ebert	
Portugal	1925	1	Death of João Chagas	
Costa Rica	1926	3	Victims of the El Virilla train accident	
Bolivia	1928	1	Death of Amadeo Moscoso	National mourning on October 3.
Honduras	1929	1	Victims of a bus crash near Saucé	
Germany	1929	At least 1	Death of German Foreign Minister Gustav Stresemann	

=== 1930s ===
Country	Year	Days	Reason	Notes
France	1930	1	Victims of the 1930 Southern France floods	
Mexico	1930	1	Death of Pablo Sidar Escobar	National mourning on May 15.
Dominican Republic	1930	1	Victims of the 1930 San Zenón hurricane	National mourning on October 3
France	1930	1	Victims of the R101 disaster	National mourning on October 7
Bolivia	1931	1	Death of Eduardo Zapcovic Lizárraga	National mourning on September 30.
Peru	1932	1	Victims of the 1932 Trujillo uprising	National mourning on July 15.
Panama	1932	3	Death of Tomás Arias	
Bolivia	1932	1	Death of Alfredo H. Otero	National mourning on October 9.
Lithuania	1933	At least 1	Victims of a plane crash in Germany (Modern day Poland)	Was set to land in Kaunas. Thousands of people went to the funeral. First time national mourning was declared in Lithuania.
Bolivia	1933	2	Death of Daniel Sánchez Bustamante	
France	1933	At least 2	Victims of the Lagny-Pomponne rail accident	
Romania	1934	1	Death of Vasile Goldiș	National mourning in February 12. First time national mourning was declared in Romania.
Netherlands	1934	1	Death of former Queen consort Emma	
Peru	1934	1	Death of former president Luis Miguel Sánchez Cerro	National mourning on April 29.
Nicaragua	1934	3	Victims of the 1934 Central America hurricane	
Poland	1934	1	Assassination of Interior Minister Bronisław Pieracki	Public shows, concerts, and games were suspended.
Netherlands	1934	1	Death of Duke Henry, prince consort	
Germany	1934	14	Death of President Paul von Hindenburg	Longest mourning period to be observed in Germany
Yugoslavia	1934	180	Assassination of King Alexander I of Yugoslavia and foreign minister Louis Barthou	The general folk mourning lasted six months, the deepest until October 25, and the deep until November 21. A number of cultural and musical events were canceled as a sign of respect. This was the longest mourning to be observed in Yugoslavia
France	1934	30	Assassination of King Alexander I of Yugoslavia and foreign minister Louis Barthou	Longest mourning period to be observed in France
Panama	1934	3	Death of Martin F. Sosa	
Poland	1935	3	Death of Polish statesman Józef Piłsudski	Public shows, concerts, and games were suspended.
Panama	1935	8	Death of Rafael Niera	
Belgium	1935	7	Death of Queen Astrid of Sweden	First time national mourning was declared in Belgium.
Brazil	1935	1	Death of Queen Astrid of Sweden	First time national mourning was declared in Brazil.
Nicaragua	1935	3	Death of Alberto Gamez	
Egypt	1935	1	Victims of the 1935-1936 protests in Egypt	National mourning on November 21. First time national mourning was declared in Egypt.
United Kingdom	1936	8	Death of King George V	
Czechoslovakia	1937	7	Death of former President Tomáš Garrigue Masaryk	First and longest period of mourning observed in Czechoslovakia.
Nicaragua	1937	At least 1	Death of Alejandro Vega Matus	
Cuba	1938	1	Victims of a plane crash in Colombia	
Poland	1938	At least 1	Death of Armenian Catholic Archbishop of Lviv Józef Teodorowicz	
Turkey	1938	3	Death of founding leader and president Mustafa Kemal Atatürk	Schools and official offices across the country were closed. First time national mourning was declared in Turkey.
Bolivia	1939	1	Death of Jaime Mendoza	National mourning on January 28.
Holy See	1939	9	Death of Pope Pius XI	First time national mourning was declared in the Vatican City.
Brazil	1939	3	Death of Pope Pius XI	
Italy	1939	1	Death of Pope Pius XI	On February 14, the day of the Pope's funeral declared a day of national mourning and a day off from work. Flags lowered to mid-mast on all government and public buildings. Schools, offices and theaters were closed.
Ireland	1939	1	Death of Pope Pius XI	The Irish flag was flown at half-mast over government buildings, on other public buildings in the capital and throughout the country. Theatres were closed, dance postponed and cinemas shut down as a mark of respect. First time national mourning was declared in Ireland.
Italy	1939	At least 2	Death of Costanzo Ciano	
Brazil	1939	3	Death of Bolivian president Germán Busch	
Bolivia	1939	At least 1	Death of Bolivian president Germán Busch	
Ecuador	1939	8	Death of Ecuadorian president Aurelio Mosquera	First time national mourning was declared in Ecuador.
Brazil	1939	3	Death of Ecuadorian president Aurelio Mosquera	
Cuba	1939	3	Death of J. Butler Wright	
Dominican Republic	1939	3	Death of Panamanian president Juan Demóstenes Arosemena	First time national mourning was declared in the Dominican Republic.
Brazil	1939	3	Death of Panamanian president Juan Demóstenes Arosemena	
Panama	1939	At least 1	Death of Panamanian president Juan Demóstenes Arosemena	

=== 1940s ===
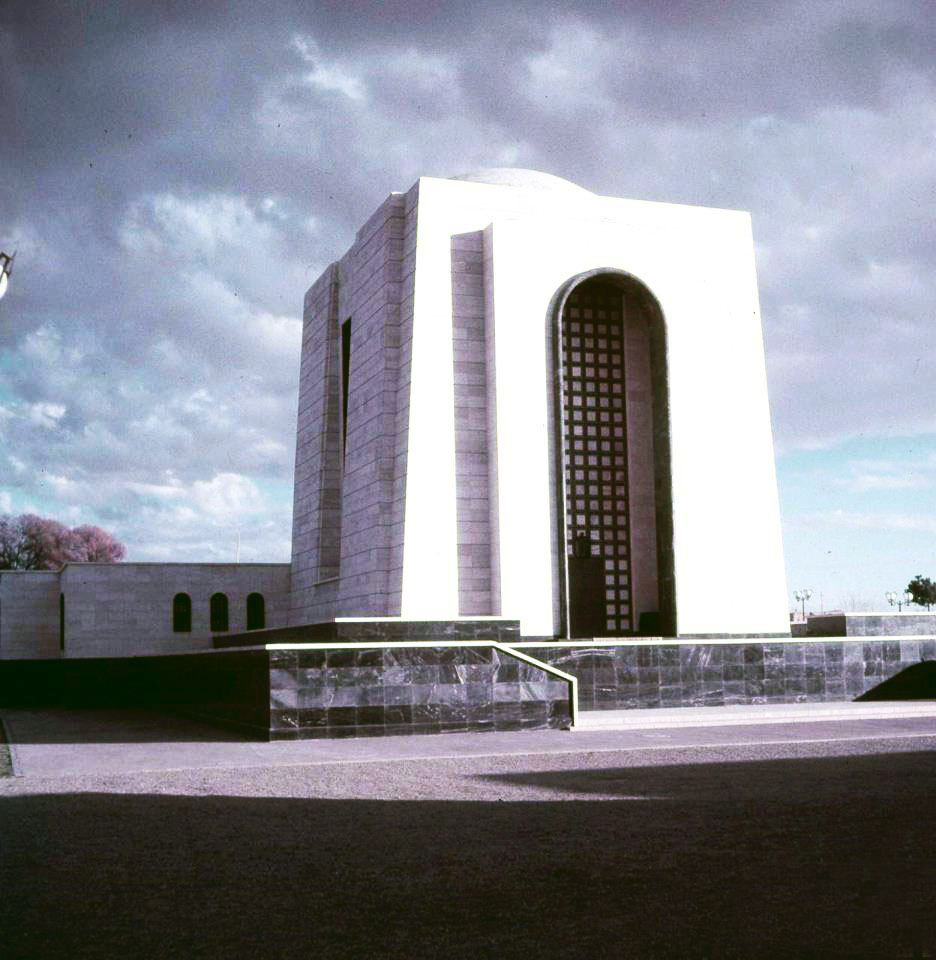
Mausoleum of Reza Shah

Country	Year	Days	Reason	Notes
Paraguay	1940	1	Death of president José Félix Estigarribia	National mourning on September 10. First time national mourning was declared in Paraguay.
Panama	1941	At least 1	Death of Nicanor de Obarrio	
Spain	1941	3	Death of former King of Spain Alfonso XIII	First time national mourning was declared in Spain.
Italy	1941	3	Death of former King of Spain Alfonso XIII	
Chile	1941	3	Death of President of Chile Pedro Aguirre Cerda	On announcement of the President's death the Stock Exchange and other public institutions suspended operations. Fifteen-day suspension of public functions. Flags were lowered to halfstaff throughout Chile. All broadcasts and public meetings were suspended.
Free France	1942	1	Victims of the March 3 1942 Paris bombings	Only time France observed national mourning in exile.
Bolivia	1942	3	Death of former president Hernando Siles	National mourning on November 24–26.
Germany	1943	3	Collapse of the Battle of Stalingrad	
Polish government-in-exile	1943	26	Death of Polish Prime Minister-in-Exile Władysław Sikorski	It was the longest period of mourning in Poland's history.
Republic of China	1943	30	Death of chairman Lin Sen	First time national mourning was announced in the Republic of China.
Brazil	1943	3	Death of chairman Lin Sen	
Argentina	1944	1	Victims of the 1944 San Juan earthquake	
San Marino	1944	3	Victims of the June 1944 San Marino bombing	First time San Marino declared a national day of mourning.
Iran	1944	1	Death of former Shah of Iran Reza Shah	July 31 declared a day of national mourning. All government and business offices closed. First time Iran declared a national day of mourning.
Nicaragua	1944	At least 2	Death of Alfonso Ayon	
Polish government-in-exile	1944	15	Collapse of the Warsaw Uprising	
Dominican Republic	1945	9	Death of U.S. President Franklin D. Roosevelt	
Nicaragua	1945	8	Death of U.S. President Franklin D. Roosevelt	Banks and stores closed at Managua, Nicaragua, when the large flag on the U.S. Embassy building was lowered to half-mast.
Belgium	1945	8	Death of U.S. President Franklin D. Roosevelt	
Paraguay	1945	8	Death of U.S. President Franklin D. Roosevelt	
Mexico	1945	3	Death of U.S. President Franklin D. Roosevelt	First time national mourning was declared in Mexico.
Brazil	1945	3	Death of U.S. President Franklin D. Roosevelt	National flags on government, state and public buildings were lowered to half-mast. On the day of the funeral, public offices were closed.
Cuba	1945	3	Death of U.S. President Franklin D. Roosevelt	Regular radio programs were suspended and limited to Roosevelt's death and the latest information about World War 2 and all national activities were suspended for five minutes on the day of the state funeral. First time national mourning was declared in Cuba.
Uruguay	1945	3	Death of U.S. President Franklin D. Roosevelt	
El Salvador	1945	3	Death of U.S. President Franklin D. Roosevelt	
Venezuela	1945	3	Death of U.S. President Franklin D. Roosevelt	
Guatemala	1945	3	Death of U.S. President Franklin D. Roosevelt	
United States	1945	1	Death of U.S. President Franklin D. Roosevelt	April 14, the day of the president's funeral was a day of national mourning. Offices, theaters, cinemas, bars were closed and sporting events and concerts were canceled.
Puerto Rico	1945	1	Death of U.S. President Franklin D. Roosevelt	Nightclubs and public entertainment events were closed.
France	1945	1	Death of U.S. President Franklin D. Roosevelt	
Argentina	1945	At least 1	Death of U.S. President Franklin D. Roosevelt	First time national mourning was declared in Argentina.
Chile	1945	At least 1	Death of U.S. President Franklin D. Roosevelt	
Peru	1945	At least 1	Death of U.S. President Franklin D. Roosevelt	
Honduras	1945	At least 1	Death of U.S. President Franklin D. Roosevelt	
Panama	1945	At least 1	Death of U.S. President Franklin D. Roosevelt	
Colombia	1945	At least 1	Death of U.S. President Franklin D. Roosevelt	
Bolivia	1945	At least 1	Death of U.S. President Franklin D. Roosevelt	
Portugal	1945	3	Death of Chancellor of Nazi Germany Adolf Hitler	Portugal was the only country to declare national mourning for Hitler's death.
Brazil	1946	3	Death of mayor of Belo Horizonte Antônio Carlos Ribeiro de Andrada	
Nicaragua	1946	8	Death of former president Juan Bautista Sacasa	Flags were at half-mast on all buildings and barracks in the country.
Chile	1946	3	Death of Chilean president Juan Antonio Ríos	First time national mourning was declared in Chile.
Brazil	1946	3	Death of Chilean president Juan Antonio Ríos	
Venezuela	1946	3	Death of Chilean president Juan Antonio Ríos	First time national mourning was declared in Venezuela.
Honduras	1946	3	Death of Chilean president Juan Antonio Ríos	First time national mourning was declared in Honduras.
Bolivia	1946	At least 1	Death of Chilean president Juan Antonio Ríos	
Philippines	1946	24	Death of former president Manuel L. Quezon	Died in 1944 but a mourning period was not declared until after World War 2.
Greece	1947	90	Death of King George II of Greece	First time national mourning was declared in Greece.
Brazil	1947	3	Death of King George II of Greece	
Brazil	1947	3	Death of king Christian X of Denmark	Brazil was the only country to declare national mourning for the death of Christian X.
India	1948	13	Assassination of Mahatma Gandhi	Entertainment events were canceled. Theaters, entertainment venues and bars were closed. Schools and public offices were closed on the day of the funeral. This was the first time that India declared a national day of mourning.
Czechoslovakia	1948	7	Death of former President Edvard Beneš	
Greece	1949	5	Death of Prime Minister of Greece Themistoklis Sofoulis	
France	1949	1	Victims of the 1949 Landes forest fire	

=== 1950s ===
Country	Year	Days	Reason	Notes
Brazil	1950	3	Death of president of Nicaragua Víctor Manuel Román y Reyes	
Panama	1950	1	Death of Julio J. Fabrega	
China	1950	1	Death of Secretary General of the Politburo of the Chinese Communist Party Ren Bishi	The then Funeral Committee recommended that entertainment activities be stopped on the day of the memorial service on October 30 and the flag be lowered to half-mast. First time the People's Republic of China declared a national day of mourning.
Brazil	1951	3	Death of Austrian president Karl Renner	
Portugal	1951	15	Death of President of Portugal Óscar Carmona	National mourning lasted from April 18 to May 2 after he was buried in Lisbons Church of Santa Engrácia.
Spain	1951	15	Death of President of Portugal Óscar Carmona	
Egypt	1951	7	Death of President of Portugal Óscar Carmona	
Mexico	1951	3	Death of President of Portugal Óscar Carmona	
Brazil	1951	3	Death of President of Portugal Óscar Carmona	
India	1951	1	Death of President of Portugal Óscar Carmona	
Uruguay	1951	1	Death of President of Portugal Óscar Carmona	First time national mourning was declared in Uruguay.
Jordan	1951	1	Assasination of Abdullah I of Jordan	
Portugal	1951	1	Death of former Queen-consort Amélie of Orléans	
Guatemala	1952	3	Death of Enrique Muñoz Meany	
Ethiopia	1952	14	Death of King George VI	
United Kingdom	1952	9	Death of King George VI	As the news of the King's death spread, all cinemas and theatres closed, and BBC programmes were cancelled except for news bulletins. Flags in every town were at half-mast, and sports fixtures were cancelled. On February 15, the day of the funeral was declared a public holiday. All businesses, schools and offices were closed for the day
Australia	1952	1	Death of King George VI	National mourning on February 17 with flags at half-mast. First time national mourning was declared in Australia.
Canada	1952	1	Death of King George VI	February 15 is the day of the official national mourning. Public offices and schools were closed on that day.
Costa Rica	1952	1	Death of King George VI	First time national mourning was declared in Costa Rica.
India	1952	1	Death of King George VI	
New Zealand	1952	1	Death of King George VI	National mourning on February 15. First time national mourning was declared in New Zealand.
Argentina	1952	30	Death of First Lady of Argentina Eva Perón	Many theaters, cinemas, restaurants, and businesses were closed for days. This was the longest mourning period to be declared in Argentina.
Netherlands	1953	1	Victims of the North Sea flood of 1953 (watersnoodramp)	
Albania	1953	14	Death of Soviet leader Joseph Stalin	The national flag was lowered to half mast and work was immediately suspended in all offices and schools. All theatrical, cinematic, artistic and other entertainments were canceled. First time national mourning was declared in Albania.
Soviet Union	1953	4	Death of Soviet leader Joseph Stalin	The television broadcast a program commemorating the deceased leader, and the radio broadcast the music of mourning. Theaters, cinemas and entertainment venues were closed, concerts and sports games were cancelled.
Romania	1953	4	Death of Soviet leader Joseph Stalin	Theaters, cinemas and entertainment venues closed.
Bulgaria	1953	4	Death of Soviet leader Joseph Stalin	Theaters, cinemas and entertainment venues closed. First time national mourning was declared in Bulgaria.
China	1953	3	Death of Soviet leader Joseph Stalin	National mourning on March 7–9.
Poland	1953	1	Death of Soviet leader Joseph Stalin	Entertainment venues were closed.
Czechoslovakia	1953	1	Death of Soviet leader Joseph Stalin	Theaters, cinemas and entertainment venues closed.
Hungary	1953	1	Death of Soviet leader Joseph Stalin	Theaters, cinemas and entertainment venues closed. First time national mourning was declared in Hungary.
East Germany	1953	1	Death of Soviet leader Joseph Stalin	First time national mourning was declared in East Germany.
Czechoslovakia	1953	5	Death of President Klement Gottwald	Theater performances cancelled, entertainment venues closed, mourning music was played by radio stations.
Yugoslavia	1953	5	Death of Boris Kidrič	Days of national mourning form April 11 to 15.
Bolivia	1953	9	Death of First Lady Carmela Cerruto de Paz Estenssoro	National mourning on December 7–15 with the national flag being hoisted at half mast in public offices and private buildings and the suspension of private and public activities on the day of the funeral.
Uruguay	1954	2	Death of Alvaro Vargas Guillemette	National mourning on June 26–27.
Costa Rica	1954	At least 1	Death of former President Julio Acosta García	
Brazil	1954	8	Death of President Getúlio Vargas	After the president's suicide, an eight day long mourning was declared with flags at half-mast but a state funeral was not held.
Bolivia	1954	3	Death of President Getúlio Vargas	National mourning on August 25–27. Flags lowered half-mast.
Argentina	1954	3	Death of President Getúlio Vargas	
Ecuador	1954	3	Death of President Getúlio Vargas	
Chile	1954	3	Death of President Getúlio Vargas	
Paraguay	1954	3	Death of President Getúlio Vargas	
Uruguay	1954	3	Death of President Getúlio Vargas	
Nicaragua	1954	3	Death of President Getúlio Vargas	
Dominican Republic	1954	3	Death of President Getúlio Vargas	
Cuba	1954	3	Death of President Getúlio Vargas	
Haiti	1954	3	Victims of Hurricane Hazel	First time national mourning was declared in Haiti.
Cuba	1955	3	Assassination of President of Panama José Antonio Remón Cantera	Flags will fly at half staff on all public buildings and military installations.
Brazil	1955	5	Death of former president Artur Bernardes	
Greece	1955	5	Death of Prime Minister of Greece Alexandros Papagos	
Poland	1956	4	Death of former President Bolesław Bierut	Theaters, cinemas and entertainment venues closed, radio stations played classical music.
Belgium	1956	1	Victims of the Marcinelle mining disaster	
Nicaragua	1956	8	Assassination of President of Nicaragua Anastasio Somoza García	
Panama	1956	2	Assassination of President of Nicaragua Anastasio Somoza García	
Chile	1957	3	Death of Gabriela Mistral	
Brazil	1957	3	Death of former president José Linhares	
Philippines	1957	30	Death of President of the Philippines Ramon Magsaysay	First time national mourning was declared in the Commonwealth of the Philippines.
Venezuela	1957	3	Death of president of Guatemala Carlos Castillo Armas	
Czechoslovakia	1957	5	Death of President Antonín Zápotocký	
Spain	1958	10	Death of Pope Pius XII	
Holy See	1958	9	Death of Pope Pius XII	
Brazil	1958	5	Death of Pope Pius XII	
Italy	1958	3	Death of Pope Pius XII	Schools and places of entertainment were closed.
Portugal	1958	3	Death of Pope Pius XII	
Cuba	1958	3	Death of Pope Pius XII	Last time national mourning was declared in Cuba before becoming communist.
Peru	1958	1	Death of Pope Pius XII	
Argentina	1959	1	Death of John Foster Dulles	
Costa Rica	1959	1	Death of Rubén Odio Herrera	

=== 1960s ===
Country	Year	Days	Reason	Notes
Brazil	1960	5	Death of Osvaldo Aranha	
Argentina	1960	At least 1	Death of Amadeo Sabattini	
Guatemala	1960	5	Victims of a fire at a hospital in Guatemala City	
East Germany	1960	3	Death of President of East Germany Wilhelm Pieck	
Cuba	1961	3	Assassination of former Prime Minister of the Democratic Republic of the Congo Patrice Lumumba	Flags at half-mast on government and public buildings.
Brazil	1961	5	Death of former president Carlos Luz	
Brazil	1961	1	Death of Borges de Medeiros	
Netherlands	1962	1	Victims of the Harmelen train disaster	
Brazil	1962	3	Death of Minister of State Gabriel Passos	
Spain	1962	1	Victims of the 1962 Vallés floods	
Netherlands	1962	1	Death of former Queen Wilhelmina	It was decided that the flags should be hung in half mast, that theater and cinema performances and sports competitions should be canceled, that in public places music should only be heard softly and that it should come from one of the Dutch radio or television channels.
Costa Rica	1962	1	Death of Alfredo González Flores	
Cuba	1963	3	Death of President of Israel Yitzhak Ben-Zvi	First time national mourning was declared in communist Cuba.
Congo-Brazzaville	1963	3	Death of President of Israel Yitzhak Ben-Zvi	First time national mourning was declared in Congo-Brazzaville (Later renamed to the Republic of Congo).
Israel	1963	At least 2	Death of President of Israel Yitzhak Ben-Zvi	Entertainment venues closed, cultural and entertainment events canceled. The radio played quiet and mournful music. First time national mourning was declared in Israel.
Argentina	1963	1	Death of President of Israel Yitzhak Ben-Zvi	February 24 was the day of national mourning.
Spain	1963	10	Death of Pope John XXIII	
Holy See	1963	9	Death of Pope John XXIII	
Philippines	1963	9	Death of Pope John XXIII	
Brazil	1963	5	Death of Pope John XXIII	
Italy	1963	3	Death of Pope John XXIII	Schools and places of entertainment were closed.
Paraguay	1963	3	Death of Pope John XXIII	
Portugal	1963	3	Death of Pope John XXIII	
Guatemala	1963	3	Death of Pope John XXIII	National flags were at half mast at all government buildings. First time national mourning was declared in Guatemala.
Congo-Brazzaville	1963	1	Death of Pope John XXIII	
Uruguay	1963	At least 1	Death of Pope John XXIII	
Yugoslavia	1963	2	Victims of the 1963 Skopje earthquake	
Cuba	1963	3	Victims of Hurricane Flora	
Liberia	1963	30	Assassination of U.S. President John F. Kennedy	First time national mourning was declared in Liberia.
Portugal	1963	At least 15	Assassination of U.S. President John F. Kennedy	
Argentina	1963	8	Assassination of U.S. President John F. Kennedy	
Ecuador	1963	8	Assassination of U.S. President John F. Kennedy	
Nicaragua	1963	8	Assassination of U.S. President John F. Kennedy	
Algeria	1963	7	Assassination of U.S. President John F. Kennedy	First time national mourning was declared in Algeria.
Dahomey	1963	7	Assassination of U.S. President John F. Kennedy	Flags were at half mast and a mass was held on November 26. First time national mourning was declared in Dahomey (Later renamed to Benin).
Costa Rica	1963	5	Assassination of U.S. President John F. Kennedy	
San Marino	1963	3	Assassination of U.S. President John F. Kennedy	Public offices and schools were closed.
Greece	1963	3	Assassination of U.S. President John F. Kennedy	Flags on public buildings and ships were flown at half-mast. The national mourning ended on the evening of November 25. Following another decision by the Prime Minister, public offices, banks, the stock exchange, and other state offices were closed.
Israel	1963	3	Assassination of U.S. President John F. Kennedy	From all governmental buildings on all levels–national and local–flags flew at half-mast. Entertainment venues were closed.
Philippines	1963	3	Assassination of U.S. President John F. Kennedy	During this period, flags of all government buildings and installations throughout the Philippines were flown at half-mast.
Indonesia	1963	3	Assassination of U.S. President John F. Kennedy	First time national mourning was declared in Indonesia.
Brazil	1963	3	Assassination of U.S. President John F. Kennedy	
Colombia	1963	3	Assassination of U.S. President John F. Kennedy	First time national mourning was declared in Colombia.
El Salvador	1963	3	Assassination of U.S. President John F. Kennedy	First time national mourning was declared in El Salvador.
Venezuela	1963	3	Assassination of U.S. President John F. Kennedy	
Honduras	1963	3	Assassination of U.S. President John F. Kennedy	
Guatemala	1963	3	Assassination of U.S. President John F. Kennedy	
Dominican Republic	1963	3	Assassination of U.S. President John F. Kennedy	
Mexico	1963	3	Assassination of U.S. President John F. Kennedy	All kinds of entertainment and social functions have been suspended, which the national flag at half-mast during the November 23, 24 and 25.
Gabon	1963	3	Assassination of U.S. President John F. Kennedy	Administrative buildings and shops were closed, Flags were at half mast on public buildings and religious services were held In churches and temples. First time national mourning was declared in Gabon.
South Vietnam	1963	3	Assassination of U.S. President John F. Kennedy	First time national mourning was declared in South Vietnam.
United Kingdom	1963	At least 3	Assassination of U.S. President John F. Kennedy	
Mali	1963	At least 1	Assassination of U.S. President John F. Kennedy	Flags were at half mast and a mass was held on November 26. First time national mourning was declared in Mali.
United States	1963	1	Assassination of U.S. President John F. Kennedy	Federal agencies and departments were closed. Following the official announcement of President Kennedy's death, all three commercial networks suspended their regular programming and commercials for the first time in the short history of television and ran coverage on a non-stop basis for four days. Many schools, offices, place of entertainment, stores, and factories in the US have closed. The ones that were open scheduled a minute of silence.
Netherlands	1963	1	Assassination of U.S. President John F. Kennedy	The flag was hung in half mast on government buildings. Municipalities and provinces were called to do the same and to give up "public entertainment" and music in the streets.
Ireland	1963	1	Assassination of U.S. President John F. Kennedy	Businesses, shops and schools were closed.
Peru	1963	1	Assassination of U.S. President John F. Kennedy	First time national mourning was declared in Peru.
Paraguay	1963	1	Assassination of U.S. President John F. Kennedy	
Uruguay	1963	1	Assassination of U.S. President John F. Kennedy	
Morocco	1963	1	Assassination of U.S. President John F. Kennedy	Flags are at half-mast on all public buildings, and artistic or cultural performances were postponed. Cinemas and cabarets were also closed. First time national mourning was declared in Morocco.
Congo	1963	1	Assassination of U.S. President John F. Kennedy	National mourning on November 26 with flags at half mast.
Ivory Coast	1963	1	Assassination of U.S. President John F. Kennedy	First time national mourning was declared in the Ivory Coast.
Togo	1963	1	Assassination of U.S. President John F. Kennedy	National mourning on November 26 with services being held in Protestant churches. First time national mourning was declared in Togo.
Thailand	1963	21	Death of Prime Minister of Thailand Sarit Thanarat	First time Thailand declared a national day of mourning.
Greece	1964	90	Death of Paul of Greece	
Brazil	1964	3	Death of Paul of Greece	
Philippines	1964	6	Death of Douglas MacArthur	
Bulgaria	1964	3	Death of head of state and chairman of the presidium of the national assembly of Bulgaria Dimitar Ganev	
Bhutan	1964	49	Death of Prime Minister Jawaharlal Nehru	First time national mourning was declared in Bhutan.
India	1964	12	Death of Prime Minister Jawaharlal Nehru	A 12-day state mourning has been ordered, national flags were lowered to half-mast on government, state and public buildings. Entertainment canceled. Government offices, public offices and businesses closed on the day of the funeral.
Egypt	1964	7	Death of Prime Minister Jawaharlal Nehru	
Iraq	1964	3	Death of Prime Minister Jawaharlal Nehru	National mourning on May 28–30. First time national mourning was declared in Iraq.
Cambodia	1964	3	Death of Prime Minister Jawaharlal Nehru	First time national mourning was declared in Cambodia.
Nepal	1964	3	Death of Prime Minister Jawaharlal Nehru	First time national mourning was declared in Nepal.
Kuwait	1964	3	Death of Prime Minister Jawaharlal Nehru	First time national mourning was declared in Kuwait.
Yugoslavia	1964	2	Death of Prime Minister Jawaharlal Nehru	National flags lowered on all government and public buildings and institutions. All sports and entertainment events for 2 days cancelled.
Sri Lanka	1964	2	Death of Prime Minister Jawaharlal Nehru	National mourning on May 28. First time national mourning was declared in Sri Lanka.
Uganda	1964	1	Death of Prime Minister Jawaharlal Nehru	First time national mourning was declared in Uganda.
Pakistan	1964	1	Death of Prime Minister Jawaharlal Nehru	National mourning on May 28 with flags placed at half mast. First time national mourning was declared was declared in Pakistan.
Kingdom of Sikkim	1964	1	Death of Prime Minister Jawaharlal Nehru	Only time national mourning was declared in Sikkim as an independent country.
Malaysia	1964	1	Death of Prime Minister Jawaharlal Nehru	First time national mourning was declared in Malaysia.
Syria	1964	At least 1	Death of Prime Minister Jawaharlal Nehru	Flags were at half mast. First time national mourning was declared in Syria.
Poland	1964	4	Death of Polish head of state Aleksander Zawadzki	
Philippines	1964	At least 1	Death of Eulogio Rodriguez	
United Kingdom	1965	3	Death of former Prime Minister Winston Churchill	
Brazil	1965	3	Death of former Prime Minister Winston Churchill	Flags were at half mast.
Argentina	1965	1	Death of former Prime Minister Winston Churchill	
Uruguay	1965	At least 1	Death of former Prime Minister Winston Churchill	In all public buildings, barracks, fortresses, bases aeronautics and warships, the national flag was raised at half mast during the period of mourning.
Austria	1965	5	Death of president Adolf Schärf	
Romania	1965	5	Death of General Secretary of the Romanian Communist Party and President of the State Council Gheorghe Gheorghiu-Dej	
Yugoslavia	1965	1	Victims of the 1965 Kakanj mine disaster	June 9 declared a national day of mourning.
Costa Rica	1965	At least 1	Victims of the Tragedy in Choluteca	
Kuwait	1965	30	Death of Emir of Kuwait Abdullah Al-Salim Al-Sabah	National flags are flown at half-mast on government, military, and public buildings. Public events are suspended. The day of the funeral has been declared an official holiday in all ministries, departments, and state institutions.
Jordan	1965	3	Death of Emir of Kuwait Abdullah Al-Salim Al-Sabah	A three day period of official mourning was also declared. First time national mourning was declared in Jordan. Flags at half-mast on government and public buildings. The Jordanian broadcasting station has been ordered to cancel its regular programs during the morning period and broadcast Koran recitations and funeral music.
United Arab Republic	1966	7	Death of Iraqi president Abdul Salam Arif	
Algeria	1966	7	Death of Iraqi president Abdul Salam Arif	
Lebanon	1966	3	Death of Iraqi president Abdul Salam Arif	First time national mourning was declared in Lebanon.
Kuwait	1966	3	Death of Iraqi president Abdul Salam Arif	
Jordan	1966	3	Death of Iraqi president Abdul Salam Arif	
Guinea	1967	8	Aftermath of the 1967 Sierra Leonean coups d'état	
Jamaica	1967	1	Death of former Prime Minister Donald Sangster	National mourning on January 21. First time national mourning was declared in Jamaica.
West Germany	1967	3	Death of former Chancellor of Germany Konrad Adenauer	First time national mourning was declared in West Germany.
Belgium	1967	1	Victims of the L'Innovation Department Store fire	
Cuba	1967	3	Death of Che Guevara	
Gabon	1967	8	Death of president Léon M'ba	National mourning on November 28 – December 5.
Soviet Union	1968	1	Deaths of Soviet cosmonaut Yuri Gagarin and Soviet test-pilot Vladimir Seryogin	This was the 1st time in Soviet history that a day of mourning was declared for someone who was not a head of state.
United States	1968	1	Assassination of civil rights leader Martin Luther King Jr.	First time in US history national mourning was observed for someone who was not a head of state. National mourning on April 5.
United States	1968	1	Assassination of U.S. presidential candidate Robert F. Kennedy	National mourning on June 9. Flags were flown at half mast on all buildings, ground and naval vessels of the Federal government in the District of Columbia and throughout the United States and its Territories and possessions.
Brazil	1968	3	Death of Mascarenhas de Morais	
Israel	1969	2	Death of Prime Minister Levi Eshkol	Flags across the country were brought to half mast and all places of entertainment were closed.
United States	1969	1	Death of former U.S. President Dwight D. Eisenhower	National mourning on March 31. Federal agencies and departments were closed. Flags were displayed at half mast at the White House and on all buildings, grounds and naval vessels for 30 days from the day of the death.
Congo-Léopoldville	1969	1	Death of former President of the Democratic Republic of the Congo Joseph Kasa-Vubu	The day of the funeral was a day of national mourning. Cinemas, shops, restaurants, factories and offices were closed. First time national mourning was declared in Congo-Léopoldville (Later renamed to the Democratic Republic of the Congo).
Bolivia	1969	30	Death of president René Barrientos	
Trinidad and Tobago	1969	14	Death of President of India Zakir Husain	First time national mourning was declared in Trinidad and Tobago.
India	1969	13	Death of President of India Zakir Husain	Flags at half mast. May 3 and 5, 1969, days off from work. All entertainment and cultural events canceled. Radio stations played classical and funeral music.
United Arab Republic	1969	7	Death of President of India Zakir Husain	
South Yemen	1969	7	Death of President of India Zakir Husain	First time national mourning was declared in South Yemen.
Iraq	1969	3	Death of President of India Zakir Husain	
Sudan	1969	3	Death of President of India Zakir Husain	First time national mourning was declared in Sudan.
Libya	1969	3	Death of President of India Zakir Husain	First time national mourning was declared in Libya.
Nepal	1969	3	Death of President of India Zakir Husain	
Bhutan	1969	3	Death of President of India Zakir Husain	
Syria	1969	3	Death of President of India Zakir Husain	
Iran	1969	3	Death of President of India Zakir Husain	
Cuba	1969	3	Death of President of India Zakir Husain	
Pakistan	1969	At least 1	Death of President of India Zakir Husain	Flags at half mast.
Kenya	1969	7	Assassination of Minister of Justice Tom Mboya	Flags at half mast. First time national mourning was declared in Kenya.
North Vietnam	1969	8	Death of Vietnam leader Ho Chi Minh	Flags were lowered to half-mast on all public and government buildings. Radio stations played mourning music.Theaters, cinemas and other recreation places closed. First time national mourning was declared in North Vietnam.
Cuba	1969	7	Death of Vietnam leader Ho Chi Minh	National flags were lowered to half mast.
Algeria	1969	3	Death of Vietnam leader Ho Chi Minh	National flags were lowered to half mast.
North Korea	1969	1	Death of Vietnam leader Ho Chi Minh	National flags were lowered to half mast. Ban singing and dancing. First time national mourning was declared in North Korea.
Somalia	1969	5	Death of President Abdirashid Shermarke	
Guyana	1969	10	Death of Governor General David Rose	

=== 1970s ===
Country	Year	Days	Reason	Notes
Yugoslavia	1970	1	Victims of the Breza coal mine disaster	March 15 declared a national day of mourning.
Peru	1970	8	Victims of the 1970 Ancash earthquake	
Portugal	1970	4	Death of former Prime Minister António de Oliveira Salazar	The national mourning days were from July 27 to 30. Closing all public institutions on the day of the funeral, except for services which, by their nature, cannot be interrupted and suspension of public screening on the date of publication of this decree and on the day of the funeral.
Brazil	1970	3	Death of former Prime Minister António de Oliveira Salazar	
Egypt	1970	40	Death of President of Egypt Gamal Abdel Nasser	When the news of President Nasser's death came, all TV and radio stations interrupted their programming and broadcast Quran recitations and mourning songs. Theaters, cinemas, shops, schools and offices closed until the funeral on October 1.
Libya	1970	40	Death of President of Egypt Gamal Abdel Nasser	National flags at half-mast on government, public and military buildings. 3 days of total mourning, during which all government and public institutions in the country were closed. Television and radio stations played recitations of the Quran and mourning music.
Jordan	1970	40	Death of President of Egypt Gamal Abdel Nasser	
Lebanon	1970	7	Death of President of Egypt Gamal Abdel Nasser	
Iraq	1970	7	Death of President of Egypt Gamal Abdel Nasser	
Sudan	1970	7	Death of President of Egypt Gamal Abdel Nasser	
India	1970	3	Death of President of Egypt Gamal Abdel Nasser	
Brazil	1970	3	Death of President of Egypt Gamal Abdel Nasser	
Cuba	1970	3	Death of President of Egypt Gamal Abdel Nasser	
Venezuela	1970	3	Death of President of Egypt Gamal Abdel Nasser	Flags at half mast in all buildings, offices and other public dependencies.
Tunisia	1970	3	Death of President of Egypt Gamal Abdel Nasser	First time national mourning was declared in Tunisia.
Iran	1970	3	Death of President of Egypt Gamal Abdel Nasser	
Algeria	1970	At least 3	Death of President of Egypt Gamal Abdel Nasser	On September 29, all facilities, offices and schools were closed.
East Germany	1970	1	Death of President of Egypt Gamal Abdel Nasser	October 1 was the day of national mourning.
Yugoslavia	1970	1	Death of President of Egypt Gamal Abdel Nasser	
Somalia	1970	1	Death of President of Egypt Gamal Abdel Nasser	First time national mourning was declared in Somalia.
Mali	1970	1	Death of President of Egypt Gamal Abdel Nasser	National mourning on September 29.
Senegal	1970	8	Death of former President of France Charles de Gaulle	First time national mourning was declared in Senegal.
Gabon	1970	7	Death of former President of France Charles de Gaulle	
Brazil	1970	3	Death of former President of France Charles de Gaulle	Flags at half-mast on government and public buildings.
Ivory Coast	1970	3	Death of former President of France Charles de Gaulle	
Central African Republic	1970	3	Death of former President of France Charles de Gaulle	First time national mourning was declared in the Central African Republic.
France	1970	1	Death of former President of France Charles de Gaulle	As part of the national mourning, radio and television stations abandoned their regular programs in favor of those with a solemn cast. On Thursday, the day of the funeral, cinemas, theaters, schools and public offices were closed.
Chad	1970	At least 1	Death of former President of France Charles de Gaulle	First time national mourning was declared in Chad.
Dahomey	1970	At least 1	Death of former President of France Charles de Gaulle	
Yugoslavia	1971	1	Death of Milentije Popović	May 10 declared national day of mourning.
Philippines	1971	30	Death of former President Carlos P. Garcia	
Liberia	1971	35	Death of president William Tubman	
Ireland	1972	1	Victims of the Derry massacre in Northern Ireland	
Nepal	1972	13	Death of King Mahendra of Nepal	
Bangladesh	1972	1	Victims of Bangladesh Liberation War	First time national mourning was declared in Bangladesh.
Tanzania	1972	7	Assassination of Vice President Abeid Karume	Flags at half mast. First time national mourning was declared in Tanzania.
Guinea	1972	3	Death of former President of Ghana Kwame Nkrumah	First time national mourning was declared in Guinea.
Oman	1972	3	Death of former sultanate Said bin Taimur	
Nicaragua	1972	3	Victims of the 1972 Nicaragua earthquake	
Costa Rica	1972	At least 1	Victims of the 1972 Nicaragua earthquake	
United States	1972	1	Death of former U.S. President Harry S. Truman	National mourning on December 28. Federal agencies and departments were closed.
United States	1973	1	Death of former U.S. President Lyndon B. Johnson	National mourning on January 26. Federal agencies and departments were closed.
South Yemen	1973	7	Diplomats killed in a plane crash	Minister of Foreign Affairs Muhammad Saleh al-Aulaqi was among the victims.
East Germany	1973	1	Death of Chairman of the State Council Walter Ulbricht	
North Vietnam	1973	1	Death of President of Chile Salvador Allende	Chilean President Allende was killed in a coup d'état. The day was declared a national day of mourning, and all entertainments were stopped.
Ethiopia	1973	1	Death of Abebe Bikila	First time national mourning was declared in Ethiopia.
Spain	1973	3	Assassination of Prime Minister of Spain Luis Carrero Blanco	All public buildings are closed.
Turkey	1973	1	Death of former president İsmet İnönü	Flags at half mast.
Brazil	1974	3	Death of President of France Georges Pompidou	Flags at half-mast on government and public buildings.
Spain	1974	3	Death of President of France Georges Pompidou	The national flag has been lowered to half-mast on all government and public buildings, as well as on ships
Senegal	1974	3	Death of President of France Georges Pompidou	
Iraq	1974	3	Death of President of France Georges Pompidou	
France	1974	1	Death of President of France Georges Pompidou	On Saturday, April 6, it was a day of national mourning. On this day, theaters, cinemas, concert halls and schools were closed.
Uruguay	1974	1	Death of President of France Georges Pompidou	
Nepal	1974	1	Death of President of France Georges Pompidou	
Paraguay	1974	8	Death of President of Argentina Juan Perón	
Uruguay	1974	7	Death of President of Argentina Juan Perón	President Juan María Bordaberry went to the funeral.
Argentina	1974	3	Death of President of Argentina Juan Perón	Flags were at half mast with the funeral being on July 9, 1974. Upon hearing of President Peron's death, television stations broadcast programs commemorating the deceased president, and radio stations played subdued and mournful music. Almost all public events have been suspended.
Brazil	1974	3	Death of President of Argentina Juan Perón	
Bolivia	1974	3	Death of President of Argentina Juan Perón	
Cuba	1974	3	Death of President of Argentina Juan Perón	
Spain	1974	3	Death of President of Argentina Juan Perón	National mourning on July 2–4 with flags at half mast on all public buildings and warships.
Yugoslavia	1974	1	Victims of the Zagreb train disaster	
Zambia	1974	1	Victims of a bus accident	
Peru	1974	1	Victims of the 1974 Lima earthquake	
Ireland	1974	1	Death of President Ireland Erskine Hamilton Childers	Thursday, November 21, is the official day of national mourning.
Algeria	1974	3	Death of Ahmed Medeghri	National mourning from December 11–13.
Yugoslavia	1975	1	Death of Veljko Vlahović	March 9 declared a national day of mourning.
Kuwait	1975	40	Assassination of Faisal of Saudi Arabia	
Iran	1975	7	Assassination of Faisal of Saudi Arabia	
Saudi Arabia	1975	3	Assassination of Faisal of Saudi Arabia	Riyadh had three days of mourning during which all government activities were suspended. First time national mourning was declared in Saudi Arabia.
Iraq	1975	3	Assassination of Faisal of Saudi Arabia	Flags at half mast.
Brazil	1975	3	Assassination of Faisal of Saudi Arabia	
Spain	1975	3	Assassination of Faisal of Saudi Arabia	Flags at half mast on all public buildings and ships of the Navy.
Sudan	1975	3	Assassination of Faisal of Saudi Arabia	
Taiwan	1975	30	Death of President of Taiwan Chiang Kai-shek	All entertainment venues and clubs have closed.
Guatemala	1975	3	Death of President of Taiwan Chiang Kai-shek	
Bangladesh	1975	10	Assassination of president Bangabandhu Sheikh Mujibur Rahman	
Ireland	1975	1	Death of former Taoiseach and President of Ireland Éamon de Valera	Normal programs were canceled in favor of somber funeral music and programs relating to Mr. de Valera's life. Irish television also carried special programs.
Spain	1975	20	Death of Caudillo of Spain Francisco Franco	Flags went to half staff on public buildings, radio and television stations broadcast religious or classical music and all theaters closed until Monday.
Cuba	1975	3	Death of Caudillo of Spain Francisco Franco	The revolutionary government of Cuba ordered official mourning for three days. Since Thursday, flags have flown with half of the staff across Cuba.
Brazil	1975	3	Death of Caudillo of Spain Francisco Franco	
Nigeria	1976	7	Assassination of Head of State Murtala Muhammed	Flags were at half mast and radios were switched to funeral music. The busy traffic was also absent.
Sudan	1976	4	Assassination of Head of State Murtala Muhammed	
Uganda	1976	2	Victims of the Entebbe raid	National mourning on July 7–8
Bangladesh	1976	1	Death of national poet Kazi Nazrul Islam	Parliament of India also observed a minute of silence in his honour.
China	1976	7	Death of Premier of the People's Republic of China Zhou Enlai	All entertainment and music activities are suspended and theaters are closed.
North Korea	1976	9	Death of Chairman of the Chinese Communist Party Mao Zedong	All entertainment, music and dancing are forbidden. Theaters and other venues are closed.
Sri Lanka	1976	9	Death of Chairman of the Chinese Communist Party Mao Zedong	
Tanzania	1976	9	Death of Chairman of the Chinese Communist Party Mao Zedong	
Sierra Leone	1976	9	Death of Chairman of the Chinese Communist Party Mao Zedong	First time national mourning was declared in Sierra Leone.
China	1976	7	Death of Chairman of the Chinese Communist Party Mao Zedong	All entertainment and music activities are suspended and theaters are closed.
Cambodia	1976	7	Death of Chairman of the Chinese Communist Party Mao Zedong	
Pakistan	1976	7	Death of Chairman of the Chinese Communist Party Mao Zedong	
Albania	1976	3	Death of Chairman of the Chinese Communist Party Mao Zedong	From September 16 to 18, there was a period of national mourning, during which flags were lowered to half-mast and no recreational or sports activities took place.
Venezuela	1976	3	Death of Chairman of the Chinese Communist Party Mao Zedong	
People's Republic of the Congo	1976	1	Death of Chairman of the Chinese Communist Party Mao Zedong	September 13 was declared a day of national mourning. First time national mourning was declared in Communist Congo.
Romania	1976	1	Death of Chairman of the Chinese Communist Party Mao Zedong	September 18, the day of the funeral – the day of national mourning.
Yugoslavia	1976	1	Victims of the 1976 Zagreb mid-air collision	September 12 declared a national day of mourning.
Yugoslavia	1977	1	Death of Džemal Bijedić	January 21 declared a national day of mourning.
Jordan	1977	7	Death of Queen Alia of Jordan	
India	1977	13	Death of President of India Fakhruddin Ali Ahmed	Schools and offices closed with flags at half mast.
Brazil	1977	3	Death of President of India Fakhruddin Ali Ahmed	
People's Republic of the Congo	1977	30	Assassination of president Marien Ngouabi	National mourning from March 20 to April 18. March 21 was declared a day off work.
Cuba	1977	3	Assassination of president Marien Ngouabi	
Yugoslavia	1977	1	Death of Dušan Petrović Šane	July 23 declared a national day of mourning.
Cyprus	1977	3	Death of President of Cyprus and Archbishop of Cyprus Makarios III	First time national mourning was declared in Cyprus.
Brazil	1977	3	Death of President of Cyprus and Archbishop of Cyprus Makarios III	
Portugal	1977	3	Victims of the crash of TAP Air Portugal Flight 425	
Qatar	1977	3	Death of former Emir Ahmad bin Ali Al Thani	First time national mourning was declared In Qatar.
Kuwait	1978	40	Death of Emir Sabah Al-Salim Al-Sabah	
Brazil	1978	3	Death of Emir Sabah Al-Salim Al-Sabah	
Guinea Bissau	1978	7	Death of prime minister Francisco Mendes	First time national mourning was declared in Guinea Bissau.
Holy See	1978	9	Death of Pope Paul VI	
Syria	1978	9	Death of Pope Paul VI	
Egypt	1978	7	Death of Pope Paul VI	
Bolivia	1978	5	Death of Pope Paul VI	Public and private activities suspended during the funeral.
Spain	1978	3	Death of Pope Paul VI	Flags were at half mast on all buildings and navy ships.
Brazil	1978	3	Death of Pope Paul VI	
Guatemala	1978	3	Death of Pope Paul VI	The national flag was at half mast in the national palace and on all government buildings.
Uruguay	1978	3	Death of Pope Paul VI	
Italy	1978	3	Death of Pope Paul VI	
Portugal	1978	3	Death of Pope Paul VI	
Zaire	1978	3	Death of Pope Paul VI	First time national mourning was declared in Zaire.
Lebanon	1978	3	Death of Pope Paul VI	All flags at half-staff and barring all but classical music from the national radio station.
Philippines	1978	1	Death of Pope Paul VI	November 27 was day of mourning with flags at half mast.
Kenya	1978	30	Death of President of Kenya Jomo Kenyatta	When the president's death was announced, all national flags were lowered half-mast, all shops were closed, most workplaces were closed, and workers were sent home. Public entertainment events were canceled for the duration of national mourning.
Brazil	1978	3	Death of President of Kenya Jomo Kenyatta	
Holy See	1978	9	Death of Pope John Paul I	
Bolivia	1978	6	Death of Pope John Paul I	Public and private activities suspended during the funeral.
Spain	1978	3	Death of Pope John Paul I	Flags were at half mast on all public buildings and navy ships.
Zaire	1978	3	Death of Pope John Paul I	
Lebanon	1978	3	Death of Pope John Paul I	
Dominican Republic	1978	2	Death of Pope John Paul I	
Algeria	1978	40	Death of President of Algeria Houari Boumédiène	Radio stations began to play mourning songs at the time of the president's death.
Arab League	1978	7	Death of President of Algeria Houari Boumédiène	
Zaire	1978	5	Death of President of Algeria Houari Boumédiène	
Brazil	1978	3	Death of President of Algeria Houari Boumédiène	
Libya	1978	3	Death of President of Algeria Houari Boumédiène	
Cuba	1978	3	Death of President of Algeria Houari Boumédiène	National flags are flown at half-mast on government, military and public buildings.
Yugoslavia	1978	1	Death of President of Algeria Houari Boumédiène	December 29 declared a national day of mourning.
Argentina	1978	1	Death of President of Algeria Houari Boumédiène	
Bangladesh	1979	3	Death of Prime Minister Mashiur Rahman	He was given a state funeral, being buried with full honours including a 19-gun salute
Costa Rica	1979	At least 1	Death of former Vice President Raúl Blanco Cervantes	
Yugoslavia	1979	1	Death of Đuro Pucar	April 15 declared a national day of mourning.
Mauritania	1979	40	Death of Prime Minister Ahmed Ould Bouceif in a plane crash	First time national mourning was declared in Mauritania.
Panama	1979	3	Death of former president José María Pinilla Fábrega	
India	1979	7	Assassination of former viceroy of India Louis Mountbatten	National flags to fly at half staff and canceled all official receptions during the mourning period.
Burma	1979	3	Assassination of former viceroy of India Louis Mountbatten	First time national mourning was declared in Burma.
Angola	1979	45	Death of first President of Angola Agostinho Neto	The Angolan government has called for a 45-day period of mourning for its lost leader, during which all festivals, cultural events and sports are to be banned. First time national mourning was declared in Angola.
Portugal	1979	3	Death of first President of Angola Agostinho Neto	
Brazil	1979	3	Death of first President of Angola Agostinho Neto	
Yugoslavia	1979	1	Death of first President of Angola Agostinho Neto	September 17 declared a national day of mourning.
Iran	1979	3	Death of Mahmoud Taleghani	
Czechoslovakia	1979	3	Death of Former President Ludvík Svoboda	

=== 1980s ===
Country	Year	Days	Reason	Notes
Portugal	1980	3	Victims of 1980 Azores Islands earthquake	
Vietnam	1980	5	Death of president Tôn Đức Thắng	
Yugoslavia	1980	7	Death of President of Yugoslavia Josip Broz Tito	Sports competitions, concerts were canceled, theaters, cinemas, places of entertainment and clubs were closed, television broadcast programs commemorating the deceased leader and the radio played funeral music
North Korea	1980	7	Death of President of Yugoslavia Josip Broz Tito	
Egypt	1980	7	Death of President of Yugoslavia Josip Broz Tito	
Algeria	1980	7	Death of President of Yugoslavia Josip Broz Tito	
Tanzania	1980	7	Death of President of Yugoslavia Josip Broz Tito	
Burma	1980	7	Death of President of Yugoslavia Josip Broz Tito	
Tunisia	1980	7	Death of President of Yugoslavia Josip Broz Tito	
Romania	1980	5	Death of President of Yugoslavia Josip Broz Tito	
Pakistan	1980	4	Death of President of Yugoslavia Josip Broz Tito	The Pakistani government announced a nationwide mourning from May 5 to 8. All flags were lowered half-mast due to the death of Comrade Tito. Radio and TV stations only broadcast classical and spiritual music.
Cyprus	1980	4	Death of President of Yugoslavia Josip Broz Tito	Flags on government buildings and many homes have been lowered to mid-mast, and classical music is broadcast by radio stations. President Tito's funeral day was a day of general mourning, and no work was done on that day in Cyprus.
Ghana	1980	4	Death of President of Yugoslavia Josip Broz Tito	
Jordan	1980	3	Death of President of Yugoslavia Josip Broz Tito	
Brazil	1980	3	Death of President of Yugoslavia Josip Broz Tito	
India	1980	3	Death of President of Yugoslavia Josip Broz Tito	
Ba'athist Iraq	1980	3	Death of President of Yugoslavia Josip Broz Tito	
Cuba	1980	3	Death of President of Yugoslavia Josip Broz Tito	
South Yemen	1980	3	Death of President of Yugoslavia Josip Broz Tito	
Guinea	1980	3	Death of President of Yugoslavia Josip Broz Tito	
Ethiopia	1980	3	Death of President of Yugoslavia Josip Broz Tito	
Venezuela	1980	3	Death of President of Yugoslavia Josip Broz Tito	
Zambia	1980	At least 3	Death of President of Yugoslavia Josip Broz Tito	Zambia's President Kenneth Kaunda announced a national mourning for several days after President Tito's death. During the mourning, all cultural and entertainment events were suspended, and only classical and spiritual music was broadcast on radio and television stations. The national flag of Zambia was lowered to half mast across the country. First time national mourning was declared in Zambia.
Angola	1980	2	Death of President of Yugoslavia Josip Broz Tito	In Angola, a two-day national mourning was announced after the death of President Tito. Across the country, flags were lowered to mid-mast, and all cultural, sporting and other entertainment events were canceled.
Guyana	1980	2	Death of President of Yugoslavia Josip Broz Tito	First time national mourning was declared in Guyana.
Costa Rica	1980	At least 1	Death of President of Yugoslavia Josip Broz Tito	
Sri Lanka	1980	At least 1	Death of President of Yugoslavia Josip Broz Tito	
Seychelles	1980	At least 1	Death of President of Yugoslavia Josip Broz Tito	
Cuba	1980	At least 1	Assassination of Walter Rodney	
Botswana	1980	30	Death of president Seretse Khama	
Zambia	1980	3	Death of president Seretse Khama	
Zimbabwe	1980	3	Death of president Seretse Khama	
Algeria	1980	7	Victims of the 1980 El Asnam earthquake	
Portugal	1980	5	Deaths of Prime Minister Francisco de Sá Carneiro and Minister Adelino Amaro da Costa	On December 6, all public establishments were closed, except for services which, due to their nature, must continue to operate.
Cook Islands	1981	1	Death of former Prime Minister Albert Henry	
Trinidad and Tobago	1981	17	Death of prime minister Eric Williams	
Ghana	1981	7	Death of Imoru Egala	Flags at half mast.
Ecuador	1981	8	Death of President Jaime Roldós Aguilera	President killed in a plane crash.
Brazil	1981	3	Death of President Jaime Roldós Aguilera	
Costa Rica	1981	At least 1	Death of President Jaime Roldós Aguilera	
Poland	1981	4	Death of Primate of Poland Stefan Wyszyński	The Government declared a period of national mourning through Saturday, with flags at half-staff, theaters and movie houses closed, and subdued programming on radio and television. Last time national mourning was declared in the country as a communist nation.
Bangladesh	1981	40	Assassination of President of Bangladesh Ziaur Rahman	
China	1981	1	Death of Soong Ching-ling	On the day of the funeral ceremony, which took place on June 3, the national flag was abandoned to mourning, and entertainment activities were suspended for one day.
Iran	1981	5	Victims of the 1981 Iranian Prime Minister's office bombing	President of Iran Mohammad-Ali Rajai, Prime Minister of Iran Mohammad-Javad Bahonar and other killed of bombing. Afterwards, the interim presidential council announced five national days of mourning.
Brazil	1981	3	Victims of the 1981 Iranian Prime Minister's office bombing	
Egypt	1981	40	Assassination of President Anwar Sadat	
Somalia	1981	7	Assassination of President Anwar Sadat	
Portugal	1981	3	Assassination of President Anwar Sadat	
Brazil	1981	3	Assassination of President Anwar Sadat	
Costa Rica	1981	At least 1	Assassination of President Anwar Sadat	
Yugoslavia	1982	1	Death of Jovan Veselinov	February 10 declared a national day of mourning.
Gabon	1982	3	Death of national anthem creater Georges Aleka Damas	National mourning on May 5–7.
UAE	1982	40	Death of King Khalid of Saudi Arabia	
Qatar	1982	40	Death of King Khalid of Saudi Arabia	
Egypt	1982	14	Death of King Khalid of Saudi Arabia	
Saudi Arabia	1982	3	Death of King Khalid of Saudi Arabia	Shops and offices closed for three days of mourning but flags were not at half mast.
Ba'athist Iraq	1982	3	Death of King Khalid of Saudi Arabia	flags were not at half mast.
Brazil	1982	3	Death of King Khalid of Saudi Arabia	
Ghana	1982	1	Murder of 3 Ghanaian judges	
Paraguay	1982	8	Death of former president Tomás Romero Pereira	
Syria	1982	7	Death of Soviet leader Leonid Brezhnev	
Lebanon	1982	7	Death of Soviet leader Leonid Brezhnev	
South Yemen	1982	7	Death of Soviet leader Leonid Brezhnev	
Soviet Union	1982	5	Death of Soviet leader Leonid Brezhnev	All sporting events were canceled through Monday, when the mourning period ended. Schools were closed on the day of the funeral and artillery salvoes were fired in major cities. The television broadcast a program commemorating the deceased leader, and the radio broadcast the music of mourning.
North Korea	1982	4	Death of Soviet leader Leonid Brezhnev	All government systems, offices, factories and schools flew flags at half-mast and all singing and dancing was banned.
Laos	1982	4	Death of Soviet leader Leonid Brezhnev	
Cuba	1982	4	Death of Soviet leader Leonid Brezhnev	
Mozambique	1982	4	Death of Soviet leader Leonid Brezhnev	
Angola	1982	4	Death of Soviet leader Leonid Brezhnev	
India	1982	3	Death of Soviet leader Leonid Brezhnev	
Brazil	1982	3	Death of Soviet leader Leonid Brezhnev	
Mongolian People's Republic	1982	3	Death of Soviet leader Leonid Brezhnev	November 13–15 were declared days of national mourning. National flags were flown at half-mast on government and public buildings. All festive events and entertainment were suspended.
Vietnam	1982	3	Death of Soviet leader Leonid Brezhnev	
Kampuchea	1982	3	Death of Soviet leader Leonid Brezhnev	
Afghanistan	1982	3	Death of Soviet leader Leonid Brezhnev	
Nicaragua	1982	3	Death of Soviet leader Leonid Brezhnev	
Jordan	1982	3	Death of Soviet leader Leonid Brezhnev	
Czechoslovakia	1982	1	Death of Soviet leader Leonid Brezhnev	
Argentina	1982	1	Death of Soviet leader Leonid Brezhnev	On November 15, the day of the funeral was declared a day of national mourning. Flags lowered half-mast.
Yugoslavia	1982	1	Death of Soviet leader Leonid Brezhnev	November 15 declared a national day of mourning.
Benin	1982	1	Death of Soviet leader Leonid Brezhnev	
Sri Lanka	1982	1	Death of Soviet leader Leonid Brezhnev	November 15, the day of his funeral, was declared a day of national mourning. Flags were flown at half-mast on all government and public buildings.
Union of South Africa	1982	1	Victims of the 1982 Maseru massacre	Thirty South Africans were killed in the attack.
Nicaragua	1982	3	Victims of the 1982 San Andres de Bocay helicopter crash	84 people were killed in the crash.
Botswana	1983	14	Death of vice president Lenyeletse Seretse	
Guinea	1983	2	Victims of the 1983 CAAK Ilyushin Il-62 crash	
Somalia	1983	3	Death of former President of Burundi Michel Micombero	
United States	1983	1	Victims of the shootdown of Korean Air Lines Flight 007 over the Sea of Japan	
Costa Rica	1983	1	Victims of the shootdown of Korean Air Lines Flight 007 over the Sea of Japan	
Costa Rica	1983	At least 1	Death of Raúl Hess Estrada	
Costa Rica	1983	At least 1	Death of former King Leopold III of Belgium	
Cuba	1983	5	Cuban victims of United States invasion of Grenada	3 days of official mourning. All public places of Entertainment were closed for 2 days while flags flew at half mast and schools were closed.
Chad	1984	7	Death of Minister of Foreign Affairs Idriss Miskine	
Syria	1984	7	Death of Soviet leader Yuri Andropov	Offices remained open but flags were at half mast.
Soviet Union	1984	4	Death of Soviet leader Yuri Andropov	Theaters, cinemas and entertainment venues were closed. Schools were closed on the day of the funeral
Cuba	1984	4	Death of Soviet leader Yuri Andropov	
India	1984	3	Death of Soviet leader Yuri Andropov	Canceled all official entertainment.
Afghanistan	1984	3	Death of Soviet leader Yuri Andropov	
Brazil	1984	3	Death of Soviet leader Yuri Andropov	
Ba'athist Iraq	1984	3	Death of Soviet leader Yuri Andropov	
Benin	1984	3	Death of Soviet leader Yuri Andropov	
Ghana	1984	3	Death of Soviet leader Yuri Andropov	
Bulgaria	1984	2	Death of Soviet leader Yuri Andropov	
North Korea	1984	2	Death of Soviet leader Yuri Andropov	
People's Republic of the Congo	1984	2	Death of Soviet leader Yuri Andropov	
Zimbabwe	1984	2	Death of Soviet leader Yuri Andropov	Flags at half mast.
Costa Rica	1984	1	Death of Soviet leader Yuri Andropov	
Sri Lanka	1984	1	Death of Soviet leader Yuri Andropov	February 14 has been declared a day of national mourning. National flags are flown at half-mast on government and public buildings and facilities.
Czechoslovakia	1984	1	Death of Soviet leader Yuri Andropov	
Yugoslavia	1984	1	Death of Soviet leader Yuri Andropov	Federal Executive Council declares February 14 the Day of mourning. All public institutions are ordered to lower the flag to half-mast.
Romania	1984	1	Death of Soviet leader Yuri Andropov	February 14 has been declared a day of national mourning..
Guinea	1984	40	Death of President Ahmed Sékou Touré	National mourning period lasting for a 40-day period starting March 27, 1984. Flags were at half mast on all buildings and at all public areas. All forms of entertainment were suspended.
Togo	1984	7	Death of President Ahmed Sékou Touré	National mourning on March 27 – April 2.
Brazil	1984	3	Death of President Ahmed Sékou Touré	
Ghana	1984	3	Death of President Ahmed Sékou Touré	
Yugoslavia	1984	1	Death of President Ahmed Sékou Touré	March 30 declared a national day of mourning.
India	1984	12	Assassination of Prime Minister Indira Gandhi	National mourning from October 31 to November 11. In times of mourning, flags were flown at half-mast on all government, state, and public buildings, and all entertainment and cultural events were canceled. Public offices have been closed.
Tanzania	1984	7	Assassination of Prime Minister Indira Gandhi	
Uganda	1984	5	Assassination of Prime Minister Indira Gandhi	Flags at half mast.
Cuba	1984	4	Assassination of Prime Minister Indira Gandhi	
Pakistan	1984	3	Assassination of Prime Minister Indira Gandhi	
Brazil	1984	3	Assassination of Prime Minister Indira Gandhi	
Uruguay	1984	3	Assassination of Prime Minister Indira Gandhi	
Nicaragua	1984	3	Assassination of Prime Minister Indira Gandhi	
Vietnam	1984	3	Assassination of Prime Minister Indira Gandhi	National mourning on November 2–4. National flags flown at half-mast on all government and public buildings. All entertainment suspended.
Gabon	1984	3	Assassination of Prime Minister Indira Gandhi	
Portugal	1984	2	Assassination of Prime Minister Indira Gandhi	
Bulgaria	1984	1	Assassination of Prime Minister Indira Gandhi	Last time national mourning was observed in Bulgaria as a communist country.
Yugoslavia	1984	1	Assassination of Prime Minister Indira Gandhi	November 3 declared a national day of mourning.
Cyprus	1984	1	Assassination of Prime Minister Indira Gandhi	The day of the funeral is a day of national mourning and a public holiday. National flags flown at half-mast on government and public buildings.
Mongolian People's Republic	1984	1	Assassination of Prime Minister Indira Gandhi	November 3, the day of the funeral of the Prime Minister of India, is a day of national mourning in Mongolia. National flags flown at half-mast on government and public buildings.
Mauritius	1984	1	Assassination of Prime Minister Indira Gandhi	
Iran	1985	1	Death of Ahmad Khonsari	
Soviet Union	1985	3	Death of Soviet leader Konstantin Chernenko	Monday, Tuesday and Wednesday were declared official days of mourning for the dead leader, entertainment venues and theaters closed, with all elementary and secondary schools closed on Wednesday, the day of the funeral.
India	1985	3	Death of Soviet leader Konstantin Chernenko	
Brazil	1985	3	Death of Soviet leader Konstantin Chernenko	
Ba'athist Iraq	1985	3	Death of Soviet leader Konstantin Chernenko	
Syria	1985	3	Death of Soviet leader Konstantin Chernenko	
Nicaragua	1985	3	Death of Soviet leader Konstantin Chernenko	
Pakistan	1985	2	Death of Soviet leader Konstantin Chernenko	
North Korea	1985	2	Death of Soviet leader Konstantin Chernenko	
People's Republic of Kampuchea	1985	2	Death of Soviet leader Konstantin Chernenko	
Guinea-Bissau	1985	2	Death of Soviet leader Konstantin Chernenko	
East Germany	1985	1	Death of Soviet leader Konstantin Chernenko	
Czechoslovakia	1985	1	Death of Soviet leader Konstantin Chernenko	Last time national mourning was declared in the country before its dissolution.
Yugoslavia	1985	1	Death of Soviet leader Konstantin Chernenko	March 13 declared a national day of mourning.
Yugoslavia	1985	1	Victims of the 1985 Jablanica bus crash.	April 8 declared a national day of mourning.
Albania	1985	7	Death of Albanian leader Enver Hoxha	Flags at half mast. Cinemas, theaters and places of entertainment were closed, the radio was playing funeral music.
Brazil	1985	8	Death of President-elect of Brazil Tancredo Neves	
Guyana	1985	14	Death of President of Guyana Forbes Burnham	All government functions were canceled. Many stores, restaurants and theaters were closed immediately after government radio announced Burnhan's death.
Brazil	1985	3	Death of President of Guyana Forbes Burnham	
Yugoslavia	1985	1	Death of President of Guyana Forbes Burnham	August 11 declared a national day of mourning.
Cuba	1985	At least 1	Death of President of Guyana Forbes Burnham	
Portugal	1985	3	Victims of Moimenta-Alcafache train crash	
Mexico	1985	3	Victims of the 1985 Mexico City earthquake	
Bangladesh	1985	3	Victims of the 1985 Jagannath Hall tragedy	
Ivory Coast	1985	2	Death of Mamadou Coulibaly	Flags at half mast.
Cuba	1986	3	Assassination of Prime Minister of Sweden Olof Palme	
Nicaragua	1986	3	Assassination of Prime Minister of Sweden Olof Palme	
Portugal	1986	3	Assassination of Prime Minister of Sweden Olof Palme	
Ghana	1986	3	Assassination of Prime Minister of Sweden Olof Palme	National flags are flown at half-mast on all government and public buildings.
Sweden	1986	2	Assassination of Prime Minister of Sweden Olof Palme	The day after the murder on March 1 and the funeral day on March 15 were days of unofficial mourning, during which flags flew at half staff around the country, church bells pealed, theatres canceled performances and television and radio stations recast their programs.
India	1986	1	Assassination of Prime Minister of Sweden Olof Palme	
Argentina	1986	1	Assassination of Prime Minister of Sweden Olof Palme	
Yugoslavia	1986	1	Assassination of Prime Minister of Sweden Olof Palme	March 15 declared a national day of mourning.
Solomon Islands	1986	1	Victims of Cyclone Namu	National mourning on June 2.
Vietnam	1986	5	Death of General Secretary of the Communist Party of Vietnam Lê Duẩn	
Senegal	1986	1	Death of Cheikh Anta Diop	
Cameroon	1986	1	Victims of the Lake Nyos disaster	National mourning on August 30 which was the first time national mourning was declared in the country.
Chile	1986	3	Death of former president Jorge Alessandri	
Brunei	1986	40	Death of former Sultan of Brunei Omar Ali Saifuddien III	Scheduled radio and television programmes were interrupted to announced the death of the former sultan. Public entertainment including that of radio and television were banned for 2 weeks.
Mozambique	1986	60	Victims of the 1986 Mozambican Tupolev Tu-134 crash	Nine passengers and one crew member survived the crash, but President Samora Machel and 33 others died, including ministers and officials of the Mozambican government. National flags are lowered to half mast on all government and public buildings. All cultural, entertainment and sports events were canceled. Radio stations played mourning and classical music.
Zimbabwe	1986	14	Victims of the 1986 Mozambican Tupolev Tu-134 crash	All competitive sporting events in Zimbabwe during the two weeks of national mourning were cancelled.
Zambia	1986	14	Victims of the 1986 Mozambican Tupolev Tu-134 crash	
Kenya	1986	9	Victims of the 1986 Mozambican Tupolev Tu-134 crash	
Mali	1986	7	Victims of the 1986 Mozambican Tupolev Tu-134 crash	
Ghana	1986	5	Victims of the 1986 Mozambican Tupolev Tu-134 crash	
People's Republic of the Congo	1986	4	Victims of the 1986 Mozambican Tupolev Tu-134 crash	
Nicaragua	1986	3	Victims of the 1986 Mozambican Tupolev Tu-134 crash	
Brazil	1986	3	Victims of the 1986 Mozambican Tupolev Tu-134 crash	
Portugal	1986	3	Victims of the 1986 Mozambican Tupolev Tu-134 crash	
Egypt	1986	3	Victims of the 1986 Mozambican Tupolev Tu-134 crash	
Burkina Faso	1986	3	Victims of the 1986 Mozambican Tupolev Tu-134 crash	
Senegal	1986	3	Victims of the 1986 Mozambican Tupolev Tu-134 crash	
Botswana	1986	3	Victims of the 1986 Mozambican Tupolev Tu-134 crash	
Tanzania	1986	2	Victims of the 1986 Mozambican Tupolev Tu-134 crash	National mourning on October 28–29
Uganda	1986	1	Victims of the 1986 Mozambican Tupolev Tu-134 crash	October 28, the day of President Samor Machel's funeral, a day of national mourning. National flags lowered to half-mast.
Zaire	1986	At least 1	Victims of the 1986 Mozambican Tupolev Tu-134 crash	
Yugoslavia	1987	1	Victims of the 1987 Boljevac car-truck crash	February 3 declared national day of mourning.
Philippines	1987	10	Death of Senator Jose Diokno	
Cuba	1987	3	Death of Blas Roca Calderio	
United States	1987	1	Victims of the USS Stark incident	National mourning on May 25.
India	1987	4	Death of former Prime Minister Choudhary Charan Singh	Flags were at half mast and government buildings were closed.
Barbados	1987	At least 6	Death of first president Errol Barrow	
Lebanon	1987	7	Assassination of Prime Minister Rashid Karami	Flags at half-mast on government and public buildings. Radio stations of all political shades suspended their bickering to play classical music in memory of Karami. Shops closed.
Zaire	1989	2	Victims of a train accident near Lubumbashi	
Philippines	1987	12	Assassination of Jaime Ferrer	
Ghana	1987	7	Assassination of President of Burkina Faso Thomas Sankara	
Niger	1987	30	Death of president Seyni Kountché	Flags at half mast.
Senegal	1987	At least 3	Death of president Seyni Kountché	
Togo	1987	At least 3	Death of president Seyni Kountché	
Guinea Bissau	1987	At least 3	Death of president Seyni Kountché	
Mali	1987	At least 3	Death of president Seyni Kountché	
Mauritania	1987	At least 3	Death of president Seyni Kountché	
Gabon	1987	At least 3	Death of president Seyni Kountché	
Taiwan	1988	30	Death of President Chiang Ching-kuo	All entertainment venues and clubs have closed.
Sierra Leone	1988	15	Death of former president Siaka Stevens	
Pakistan	1988	10	Death of President Muhammad Zia-ul-Haq	National flags on government and public buildings were lowered to half-mast. Radio and television stations interrupted their programs and began playing mourning music. Government offices and schools were closed for three days and a 10-day mourning period was declared.
Egypt	1988	7	Death of President Muhammad Zia-ul-Haq	
Cuba	1988	3	Death of President Muhammad Zia-ul-Haq	National mourning on August 19–21. Flags were at half mast on all public buildings and military establishments.
Brazil	1988	3	Death of President Muhammad Zia-ul-Haq	
India	1988	3	Death of President Muhammad Zia-ul-Haq	
Jordan	1988	3	Death of President Muhammad Zia-ul-Haq	Flags at half mast.
Chile	1988	1	Death of President Muhammad Zia-ul-Haq	August 19 is a day of national mourning. National flags on government and public buildings are lowered to half-mast.
Yugoslavia	1988	1	Victims of the 1988 Jablanica bus crash	September 4 declared a national day of mourning.
Yugoslavia	1988	1	Victims of the 1988 Lapovo train disaster	October 12 declared a national day of mourning.
Soviet Union	1988	1	Victims of the 1988 Armenian earthquake	This was the first time in Soviet history that a day of mourning was declared for a disaster.
Philippines	1988	1	Death of Joaquin Roces	
Japan	1989	3	Death of Emperor of Japan Hirohito	On January 8 February 9 and 24, the day of the state funeral of Emperor Hirohito, was a day of national mourning. TV and radio stations interrupted programs to broadcast information on the death of the emperor. Places of entertainment, night clubs were closed and concerts were canceled, companies and schools were closed on the day of the state funeral.
India	1989	3	Death of Emperor of Japan Hirohito	
Brazil	1989	3	Death of Emperor of Japan Hirohito	
Chile	1989	3	Death of Emperor of Japan Hirohito	
Portugal	1989	3	Death of Emperor of Japan Hirohito	
Ba'athist Iraq	1989	3	Death of Ministry of Defence Adnan Khayr Allah	Flags at half-mast.
Iran	1989	40	Death of Supreme Leader of Iran Ruhollah Khomeini	As a mark of respect, Iran's government ordered all schools closed Sunday and declared 40 days of mourning and said schools would be closed for five days.
Pakistan	1989	10	Death of Supreme Leader of Iran Ruhollah Khomeini	Flags were at half mast at all government buildings and missions abroad.
Syria	1989	7	Death of Supreme Leader of Iran Ruhollah Khomeini	
Afghanistan	1989	3	Death of Supreme Leader of Iran Ruhollah Khomeini	
India	1989	3	Death of Supreme Leader of Iran Ruhollah Khomeini	Cancelled official entertainment and ordering flags flown at half-staff.
Lebanon	1989	3	Death of Supreme Leader of Iran Ruhollah Khomeini	Flags at half mast.
Turkey	1989	1	Death of Supreme Leader of Iran Ruhollah Khomeini	Flags at half mast.
Soviet Union	1989	1	Victims of the Ufa train disaster	This was the last instance of national mourning before the Soviet Union's dissolution in 1991.
Chad	1989	3	Victims of a plane crash in Niger	
Zaire	1989	4	Death of singer Franco Luambo	
Honduras	1989	At least 2	Victims of TAN-SAHSA Flight 414	
Nicaragua	1989	At least 2	Victims of TAN-SAHSA Flight 414	
Comoros	1989	40	Assassination of president Ahmed Abdallah	
Yugoslavia	1989	1	Victims of the Aleksinački Rudnik mining disaster	
Zimbabwe	1989	2	Victims of the 1989 Chivake river bus accident	

=== 1990s ===
Country	Year	Days	Reason	Notes
Colombia	1990	3	Death of former president Alberto Lleras Camargo	
Romania	1990	1	Victims of the Romanian Revolution	Over 1,110 fatalities. January 12 was a day of national mourning to commemorate the victims of the revolution.
Italy	1990	2	Death of former President Sandro Pertini	However, there was no state funeral.
Honduras	1990	1	Victims of the Happy Land fire	Most of the victims were Honduran nationals.
Costa Rica	1990	At least 1	Death of former President José Figueres Ferrer	
Yugoslavia	1990	1	Victims of the Dobrnja-Jug mine disaster	August 31 declared a national day of mourning. Last time national mourning was observed in the country before the Yugoslav Wars.
Nicaragua	1990	2	Death of former President of the National Assembly Carlos Núñez Téllez	
Bulgaria	1990	1	Drowning of 10 service members in the river Varbitsa	
Brazil	1991	3	Death of King of Norway Olav V	
Norway	1991	At least 2	Death of King of Norway Olav V	From the day King Olav died until the funeral, the King's Flag was flown at half mast and mourning ribbons were attached. All churches all over Norway rang their bells, both the day after King Olav's death and the day he was buried. All school children in Norway were gathered in auditoriums that day and watched the funeral on national television. When the funeral was going on, all traffic in Norway was stopped. Schools were closed. All shops in Norway were closed in respect between 11am and 2pm on the day of the funeral.
Senegal	1991	8	Victims of a plane crash in Saudi Arabia	92 of the 98 victims were Senegalese troops. The plane reportedly crashed due to Iraq's burning of Kuwaiti oil fields
India	1991	7	Assassination of former Prime Minister of India Rajiv Gandhi	Closed government offices and schools.
Congo	1991	7	Victims of a train crash near Brazzaville	
Portugal	1991	1	Victims of Santa Cruz massacre in East Timor	
El Salvador	1992	3	Death of Roberto D'Aubuisson	
Senegal	1992	3	Victims of the 1992 Dakar explosion	
Philippines	1992	At least 1	Death of former Senator Lorenzo M. Tañada	
Ukraine	1992	1	Victims of a tragedy at Sukhodilska–Skhidna coal mine	Flags at half mast, No entertainment events were held and television and radio programs were switched.
Algeria	1992	7	Assassination of High Council of State Mohamed Boudiaf	Flags flew at half-staff and the government announced that the July 5 celebration to mark Algeria's independence from France 30 years ago had been canceled. Radio and television stations broadcast mourning programs. Cultural and entertainment events have been canceled.
Nauru	1992	At least 6	Death of first President Hammer DeRoburt	
Germany	1992	1	Death of former Chancellor of Germany Willy Brandt	
Brazil	1992	8	Death of Ulysses Guimarães	
Macedonia	1993	1	Victims of the Palair Macedonian Airlines Flight 301	March 9 declared national day of mourning.
Spain	1993	7	Death of Infante Juan, Count of Barcelona	Flags at half mast in all public buildings and naval ships.
Turkey	1993	4	Death of President of Turkey Turgut Özal	State media switched to mourning music, sports, music events were canceled and flags were lowered to half-staff.
Egypt	1993	3	Death of President of Turkey Turgut Özal	
Pakistan	1993	3	Death of President of Turkey Turgut Özal	
Kuwait	1993	3	Death of President of Turkey Turgut Özal	
Azerbaijan	1993	1	Death of President of Turkey Turgut Özal	
Zambia	1993	7	Victims of the 1993 Zambia national football team plane crash	Flags at half mast.
Sri Lanka	1993	5	Assassination of President of Sri Lanka Ranasinghe Premadasa	A curfew was also introduced in connection with the murder of the president. National mourning on May 5–9.
Philippines	1993	At least 1	Death of former Vice President Fernando H. Lopez	
Benin	1993	1	Death of former president Tahirou Congacou	
Belgium	1993	9	Death of King Baudouin of Belgium	
Brazil	1993	3	Death of King Baudouin of Belgium	
Zaire	1993	1	Death of King Baudouin of Belgium	
Venezuela	1993	3	Victims of Tropical Storm Bret	
Russia	1993	1	Victims of the 1993 Russian coup attempt	
Rwanda	1993	7	Assassination of President of Burundi Melchior Ndadaye	
Ivory Coast	1993/4	30	Death of President Félix Houphouët-Boigny	
Central African Republic	1993/4	3	Death of President Félix Houphouët-Boigny	
Hungary	1993	1	Death of Prime Minister of Hungary József Antall	
Bosnia and Herzegovina	1994	1	Victims of the Markale massacres	
Greece	1994	3	Death of actress, singer, politician and former Minister for Culture Melina Mercouri	First official period of mourning in the Third Hellenic Republic.
Belgium	1994	1	The killing of 10 Belgian soldiers during the Rwandan Civil War	
Zaire	1994	8	Assassination of Juvénal Habyarimana and Cyprien Ntaryamira	
Tanzania	1994	3	Assassination of Juvénal Habyarimana and Cyprien Ntaryamira	
United States	1994	1	Death of former U.S. President Richard Nixon	Federal agencies and departments were closed.
Brazil	1994	3	Death of Formula One driver Ayrton Senna	
North Korea	1994	1,097	Death of North Korean President Kim Il Sung	Total mourning period.
North Korea	1994	10	Death of North Korean President Kim Il Sung	Official mourning period. All entertainment and music activities suspended, theaters closed for the period of mourning.
Laos	1994	3	Death of North Korean President Kim Il Sung	July 14, 15 and 16 declared days of national mourning. During the period, all party and state agencies in the country as well as Laos missions abroad were instructed to hoist the national flagat half staff.
Cambodia	1994	3	Death of North Korean President Kim Il Sung	
Mozambique	1994	1	Death of North Korean President Kim Il Sung	
Argentina	1994	3	Victims of the AMIA bombing	
Costa Rica	1994	1	Death of Benjamín Núñez Vargas	
Estonia	1994	1	Victims of the sinking of the MS Estonia	285 Estonian citizens were killed. Many schools and businesses announced they were closing for several days. Radio stations played calm and gloomy music.
Finland	1994	1	Victims of the sinking of the MS Estonia	10 Finnish citizens were killed.
Sweden	1994	1	Victims of the sinking of the MS Estonia	501 Swedish citizens were killed.
Marshall Islands	1994	7	Death of Paramount chief Kabua Kabua	
India	1994	7	Death of former President Zail Singh	
Costa Rica	1994	1	Death of Manuel Mora Valverde	
Rwanda	1995	1	Victims of the Rwandan Genocide	
India	1995	7	Death of former Prime Minister Morarji Desai	
United States	1995	1	Victims of the Oklahoma City bombing	
Russia	1995	1	Victims of the 1995 Neftegorsk earthquake	
Russia	1995	1	Victims of the Budyonnovsk hospital hostage crisis	
Thailand	1995	15	Death of princess mother Srinagarindra	
Bulgaria	1995	1	14 soldiers killed in a vehicle crash in Sofia	
Brazil	1995	3	Assassination of Prime Minister of Israel Yitzhak Rabin	
Israel	1995	2	Assassination of Prime Minister of Israel Yitzhak Rabin	November 5 and 6 are days of official national mourning. Theaters, cinemas and places of entertainment were closed for two days official mourning. 30 days of Jewish mourning from the day of the funeral.
Andorra	1996	3	Death of Julià Reig Ribó	
Andorra	1996	3	Death of former President of France François Mitterrand	
France	1996	1	Death of former President of France François Mitterrand	
Lesotho	1996	10	Death of king Moshoeshoe II of Lesotho	the government declared a 10 day long mourning period until he was buried on January 26. Flags were at half mast
Croatia	1996	1	1996 Croatia USAF CT-43 crash	
Tanzania	1996	3	Sinking of the MV Bukoba	
Nigeria	1996	3	Death of former president Nnamdi Azikiwe	
India	1996	7	Death of former President Neelam Sanjeeva Reddy	
Greece	1996	4	Death of former Prime Minister Andreas Papandreou	
Ukraine	1996	1	Victims of the 1996 Kamianske tram accident	
Burundi	1996	7	Victims of the 1996 Bugendana massacre	
Greece	1996	3	Death of Patriarch Parthenius III of Alexandria	
Andorra	1996	3	Death of Francesc Escudé i Ferrero	
Bolivia	1996	30	Death of former president Hernán Siles Zuazo	
Russia	1996	1	Victims of the "terrorist attack against government agencies and residents" during the Battle of Grozny	
Portugal	1996	2	Death of former President António de Spínola	
Brazil	1996	8	Death of former President Ernesto Geisel	
Russia	1996	1	Victims of the 1996 Rostov Oblast bus-train crash	
Guatemala	1996	3	Victims of the 1996 Guatemala stadium disaster	
Costa Rica	1996	At least 1	Victims of the 1996 Guatemala stadium disaster	
Russia	1996	1	Victims of the Kaspiysk apartment building bombing	
Israel	1997	1	Victims of the Israeli helicopter disaster	February 6 was declared an official day of mourning. Theaters and cinemas were closed, radio stations played classical music.
Brazil	1997	3	Death of Mário Henrique Simonsen	
Brazil	1997	3	Death of Darcy Ribeiro	
China	1997	7	Death of Deng Xiaoping	All entertainment and music activities are suspended and theaters are closed.
Guyana	1997	6	Death of President of Guyana Cheddi Jagan	
Cuba	1997	At least 1	Death of President of Guyana Cheddi Jagan	
Suriname	1997	At least 1	Death of President of Guyana Cheddi Jagan	
Jamaica	1997	3	Death former Prime Minister Michael Manley	
Brazil	1997	1	Death of Pio Giannotti	
Costa Rica	1997	1	Death of Isaac Felipe Azofeifa	
Sierra Leone	1997	1	Victims of the Sierra Leone Civil War	National mourning on June 25
Somalia	1997	1	Assassination of Dr. Ricardo Marques	June 26 was announced as a day of mourning
Poland	1997	1	Victims of the 1997 Central European flood	Also known as the Millennium Flood in Poland.
Venezuela	1997	3	Victims of the 1997 Cariaco earthquake	
Nigeria	1997	4	Death of musician and political activist Fela Kuti	
Chile	1997	3	Death of Clodomiro Almeyda	
United Kingdom	1997	1	Death and funeral of Diana, Princess of Wales	While not an official day of mourning, the Saturday of Diana's funeral brought the UK close to a standstill. Shops and banks were closed, sports events were postponed, and theatre and cinema showings were canceled.
Bulgaria	1997	1	Victims of a mine accident in Bobov Dol	
Albania	1997	3	Death of Mother Teresa	
India	1997	1	Death of Mother Teresa	
Namibia	1997	1	Death of Moses Garoëb	National mourning on September 26
Malawi	1997	7	Death of first President of Malawi Hastings Banda	
Russia	1997	1	Victims of a mine accident in Kemerovo Oblast	
India	1998	3	Death of former Prime Minister of India Gulzarilal Nanda	
Burundi	1998	4	Death of Defence Minister Firman Sinzoyiheba	
Portugal	1998	1	Death of António Ribeiro	
Brazil	1998	3	Death of Sérgio Motta	
Brazil	1998	3	Death of Eduardo Magalhães	
Ukraine	1998	1	Victims of a tragedy at Skochinsky coal mine	
Greece	1998	4	Death of Seraphim of Athens	
Greece	1998	3	Death of former President of Greece and Prime Minister Konstantinos Karamanlis	
Germany	1998	1	Victims of the Eschede train disaster	
Nigeria	1998	7	Death of Head of State of Nigeria Sani Abacha	
Brazil	1998	3	Death of Lúcio Costa	
Papua New Guinea	1998	1	Victims of the 1998 Papua New Guinea earthquake	
Switzerland	1998	1	Victims of the Swissair Flight 111	229 people died, including 48 Swiss citizens. September 5 was declared a day of mourning.
Nicaragua	1998	3	Victims of Hurricane Mitch	
Hungary	1999	1	Victims of the 1999 Deutschlandsberg bus crash	
United Arab Emirates	1999	67	Deaths of King Hussein of Jordan and Emir Isa bin Salman Al Khalifa of Bahrain	Government offices closed for three days
Jordan	1999	3	Death of King Hussein of Jordan	Shops were quickly shuttered, and school classes canceled. The government announced there would be three days of official mourning, during which all business would be halted, and then three months of customary Muslim mourning.
Egypt	1999	3	Death of King Hussein of Jordan	
Algeria	1999	3	Death of King Hussein of Jordan	
Oman	1999	3	Death of King Hussein of Jordan	
Syria	1999	3	Death of King Hussein of Jordan	
Yemen	1999	3	Death of King Hussein of Jordan	
Palestine	1999	3	Death of King Hussein of Jordan	
Brazil	1999	3	Death of King Hussein of Jordan	
Bangladesh	1999	2	Death of King Hussein of Jordan	
Kuwait	1999	2	Death of King Hussein of Jordan	
Nepal	1999	2	Death of King Hussein of Jordan	National mourning on February 9 and 10. Flags lowered half-mast. February 9 was also announced a day off from work.
India	1999	1	Death of King Hussein of Jordan	
Uzbekistan	1999	1	Victims of the 1999 Tashkent bombings	
Bahrain	1999	90	Death of Emir of Bahrain Isa bin Salman Al Khalifa	Three months of national mourning. Government offices closed for five days.
Kuwait	1999	40	Death of Emir of Bahrain Isa bin Salman Al Khalifa	
Jordan	1999	7	Death of Emir of Bahrain Isa bin Salman Al Khalifa	
Algeria	1999	3	Death of Emir of Bahrain Isa bin Salman Al Khalifa	
Egypt	1999	3	Death of Emir of Bahrain Isa bin Salman Al Khalifa	
Libya	1999	3	Death of Emir of Bahrain Isa bin Salman Al Khalifa	
Oman	1999	3	Death of Emir of Bahrain Isa bin Salman Al Khalifa	
Palestine	1999	3	Death of Emir of Bahrain Isa bin Salman Al Khalifa	
Qatar	1999	3	Death of Emir of Bahrain Isa bin Salman Al Khalifa	
Syria	1999	3	Death of Emir of Bahrain Isa bin Salman Al Khalifa	
Yemen	1999	3	Death of Emir of Bahrain Isa bin Salman Al Khalifa	
Bangladesh	1999	1	Death of Emir of Bahrain Isa bin Salman Al Khalifa	
Russia	1999	1	Victims of the Samara police department fire	
Russia	1999	1	Victims of the 1999 Vladikavkaz bombing and a fire at a psychiatric hospital	
Cuba	1999	3	Death of Nigerean president Ibrahim Baré Maïnassara	
Chile	1999	5	Death of Raúl Silva Henríquez	
Belarus	1999	2	Victims of the Nyamiha stampede	
Zimbabwe	1999	5	Death of Vice President Joshua Nkomo	
Philippines	1999	2	Death of former Senate President Marcelo B. Fernan	
Brazil	1999	3	Death of Franco Montoro	
Morocco	1999	40	Death of King Hassan II of Morocco	After the king's death was announced, businesses, offices, and shops were closed across the country, and entertainment events were canceled.
United Arab Emirates	1999	40	Death of King Hassan II of Morocco	The United Arab Emirates, whose leader Sheik Zayed al Nahyan was a close friend of Hassan, declared 40 days of mourning and ordered all public offices closed for three days starting Saturday.
Senegal	1999	8	Death of King Hassan II of Morocco	
Bahrain	1999	7	Death of King Hassan II of Morocco	Bahrain announced a seven-day mourning and ordered public offices to be closed on Saturday.
Mauritania	1999	7	Death of King Hassan II of Morocco	
Algeria	1999	3	Death of King Hassan II of Morocco	
Egypt	1999	3	Death of King Hassan II of Morocco	
Jordan	1999	3	Death of King Hassan II of Morocco	
Lebanon	1999	3	Death of King Hassan II of Morocco	
Libya	1999	3	Death of King Hassan II of Morocco	
Palestine	1999	3	Death of King Hassan II of Morocco	
Qatar	1999	3	Death of King Hassan II of Morocco	
Sudan	1999	3	Death of King Hassan II of Morocco	
Syria	1999	3	Death of King Hassan II of Morocco	
Tunisia	1999	3	Death of King Hassan II of Morocco	
Yemen	1999	3	Death of King Hassan II of Morocco	
Portugal	1999	2	Death of King Hassan II of Morocco	
Brazil	1999	3	Death of Dom Hélder Câmara	
Russia	1999	1	Victims of the Russian apartment bombings	
Turkey	1999	1	Victims of the 1999 İzmit earthquake	
Portugal	1999	3	Death of Amália Rodrigues	
Tanzania	1999	30	Death of first President of Tanzania Julius Nyerere	National flags were lowered to half-mast on all public buildings. Tanzanian state radio played funeral music while its television station ran file video of Dr Nyerere. Some businesses have already begun to close down for a period of mourning. Entertainment and cultural events canceled, all sporting activities are postponed.
Rwanda	1999	10	Death of first President of Tanzania Julius Nyerere	During this period, flags were lowered to half-mast.
Uganda	1999	8	Death of first President of Tanzania Julius Nyerere	Flags at half mast.
Mozambique	1999	7	Death of first President of Tanzania Julius Nyerere	During this period, flags were lowered to half-mast.
Zambia	1999	4	Death of first President of Tanzania Julius Nyerere	During this period, flags were lowered to half-mast.
Kenya	1999	4	Death of first President of Tanzania Julius Nyerere	Flags at half mast.
Gabon	1999	2	Death of first President of Tanzania Julius Nyerere	Flags were at half mast.
Armenia	1999	3	Victims of Armenian parliament shooting	Armenian Prime Minister Vazgen Sargsyan and Speaker of Parliament Karen Demirchyan were killed in the assassination.
Croatia	1999	3	Death of President of Croatia Franjo Tuđman	Theaters, cafes, cinemas and entertainment venues are closed for three days of official mourning. Television and radio broadcast quiet and festive music. Schools and offices were closed on the day of the funeral.
Brazil	1999	3	Death of former President João Figueiredo	
India	1999	7	Death of former President Shankar Dayal Sharma	

== See also ==
- National day of mourning
  - List of national days of mourning (2000–2019)
  - List of national days of mourning (2020–present)
- International day of mourning, a similar concept at the international level
- European Day of Mourning, a similar concept at the EU level
- Arab League Day of Mourning, a similar concept at the Arabian level

== Bibliography ==
- Bragança, Dom Carlos Tasso de Saxe-Coburgo e. Palácio Leopoldina, in Revista do Instituto Histórico e Geográfico Brasileiro, vol. 438, 2008, p. 281-303 (ISSN 0101-4366)
