= Kaspiysk bombing =

Kaspiysk bombing may refer to:

- 1996 Kaspiysk bombing
- 2002 Kaspiysk bombing
