= Kaspiysk =

City in the Republic of Dagestan, Russia

Kaspiysk Каспийск
- City
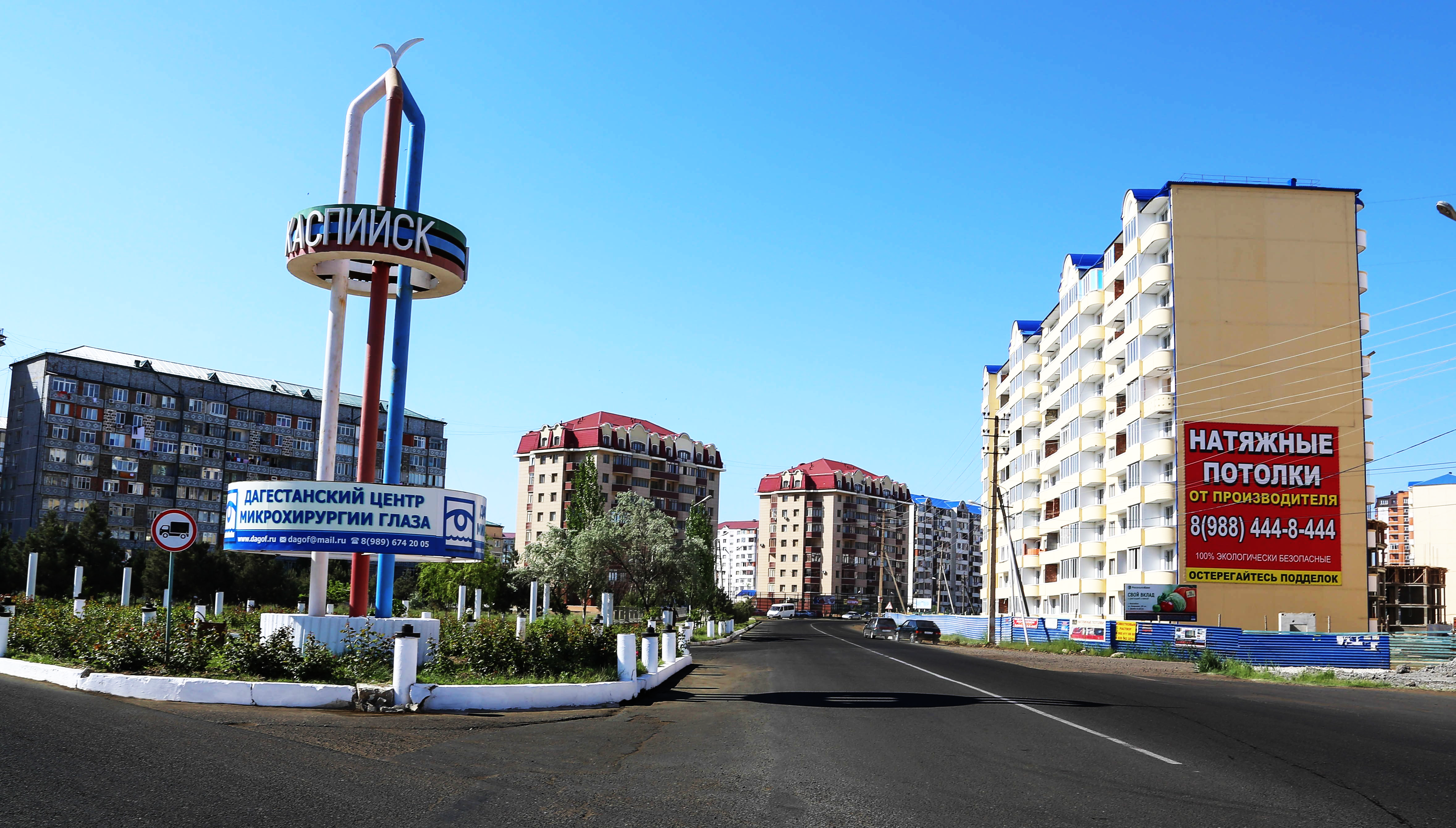
- City of Kaspiysk

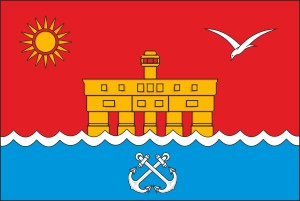
- Flag Coat of arms
- Interactive map of Kaspiysk
- Location of Kaspiysk Kaspiysk (Republic of Dagestan)
- Coordinates: 42°52′49″N 47°38′18″E
- Country: Russia
- Federal subject: Dagestan
- Founded: 1932
- City status since: 1947

Government
  - Body: Assembly of Deputies

Area
  - Total: 32.94 km^{2} (12.72 sq mi)
- Elevation: 0 m (0 ft)

Population (2010 Census)
  - Total: 100,129
  - Estimate (2024): 129,833 (+29.7%)
  - Rank: 163rd in 2010
  - Density: 3,040/km^{2} (7,873/sq mi)

Administrative status
  - Subordinated to: City of Kaspiysk
  - Capital of: City of Kaspiysk

Municipal status
  - Urban okrug: Kaspiysk Urban Okrug
  - Capital of: Kaspiysk Urban Okrug
- Time zone: UTC+3 (MSK)
- Postal code: 87246
- OKTMO ID: 82720000001
- Website: dagmo.ru/gorod-kaspiysk

Kaspiysk (Russian: Каспи́йск; Lezgin: Каспи [kaspi:]; Lak: Ккасппи; Avar: Каспиялъухъ) is a city in Dagestan, Russia, located on the Caspian Sea, 18 kilometers (11 mi) southeast of Makhachkala. The 2010 Russian census recorded the city as being the fourth-largest in Dagestan. It is a working-class satellite city to Makhachkala.

== Geography ==
=== Climate ===
Kaspiysk has a cold semi-arid climate (Köppen climate classification: BSk).

Climate data for Kaspiysk
Month	Jan	Feb	Mar	Apr	May	Jun	Jul	Aug	Sep	Oct	Nov	Dec	Year
Mean daily maximum °C (°F)	3.3 (37.9)	3.6 (38.5)	7.1 (44.8)	14.4 (57.9)	21.1 (70.0)	26.3 (79.3)	28.9 (84.0)	28.6 (83.5)	23.5 (74.3)	17.2 (63.0)	10.8 (51.4)	5.8 (42.4)	15.9 (60.6)
Daily mean °C (°F)	0.4 (32.7)	0.8 (33.4)	4.1 (39.4)	10.7 (51.3)	17.1 (62.8)	22.3 (72.1)	25.1 (77.2)	24.6 (76.3)	19.9 (67.8)	13.8 (56.8)	7.9 (46.2)	3.1 (37.6)	12.5 (54.5)
Mean daily minimum °C (°F)	−2.4 (27.7)	−2.0 (28.4)	1.1 (34.0)	7.0 (44.6)	13.2 (55.8)	18.3 (64.9)	21.4 (70.5)	20.6 (69.1)	16.4 (61.5)	10.4 (50.7)	5.0 (41.0)	0.5 (32.9)	9.1 (48.4)
Average precipitation mm (inches)	22 (0.9)	28 (1.1)	21 (0.8)	18 (0.7)	28 (1.1)	25 (1.0)	26 (1.0)	23 (0.9)	38 (1.5)	43 (1.7)	31 (1.2)	29 (1.1)	332 (13)
Source: Climate-Data.org

== History ==
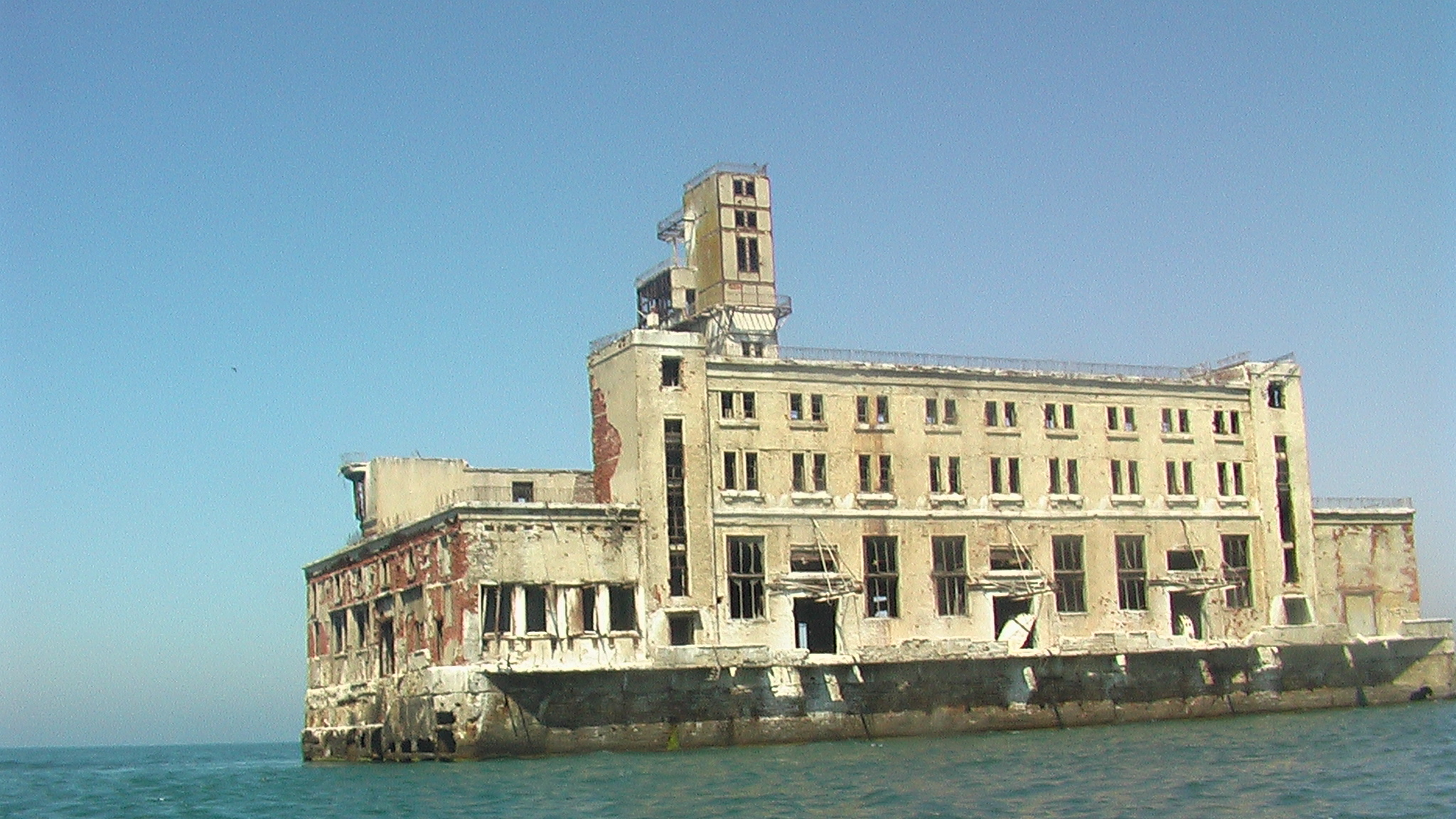
Derelict workshop of the Dagdizel Plant about 2 km out to sea

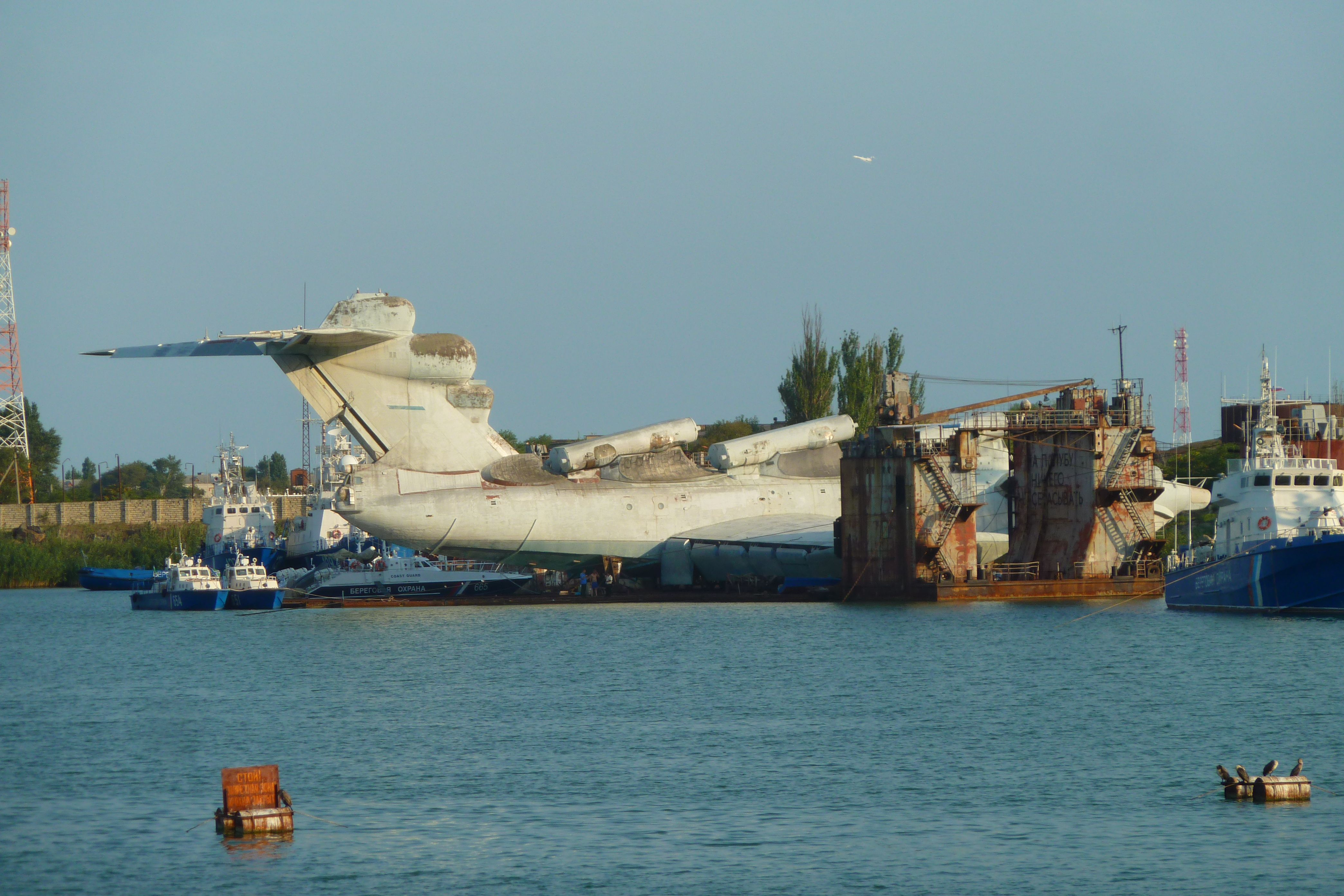
Lun-class ekranoplan at Kaspiysk in 2010

The city is one of the newer urban centers in Dagestan. It began in 1932 as a worker's encampment, servicing the needs of the nearby naval diesel engine manufacturer, Dagdizel. At the time, it was called Dvigatelstroy (Дви́гательстро́й), based upon the Russian word for "engine". During World War II, the site saw much growth due to the war effort, and became a center for major arms producers. In 1947, the settlement received the status of a city, and was given its current name, reflecting its location on the shores of the Caspian Sea.

On November 16, 1996, 68 people were killed in a Chechen bomb attack targeting an apartment.

On May 9, 2002, 43 people were killed after a bombing during a Victory Day Parade.

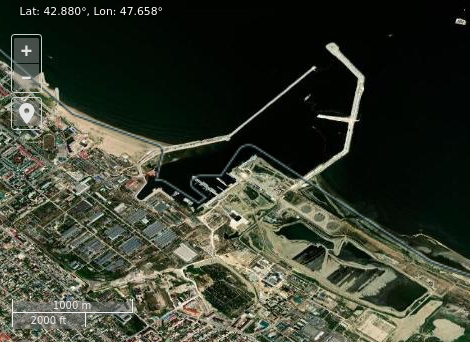
Satellite imagery of the Kaspiysk naval base and Dagdizel Plant

On November 6, 2024, Ukraine launched its first drone attack on the Kaspiysk naval base with an A-22 reportedly damaging two Gepard-class frigates and one Buyan-class corvette of the Caspian Flotilla and causing the nearby Makhachkala airport to halt operations. According to Russian social media the attack comprised four drones one of which crashed near a road causing a civilian to be hospitalized.

== Administrative and municipal status ==
Within the framework of administrative divisions, it is incorporated as the City of Kaspiysk—an administrative unit with the status equal to that of the districts. As a municipal division, the City of Kaspiysk is incorporated as Kaspiysk Urban Okrug.

== Demographics ==
Historical population
Year	Pop.	±%
1939	17,689	—
1959	25,178	+42.3%
1970	38,990	+54.9%
1979	49,382	+26.7%
1989	60,069	+21.6%
2002	77,650	+29.3%
2010	100,129	+28.9%
2021	121,140	+21.0%
Source: Census data

Population: 121,140 (2021 census); 100,129 (2010 census); 77,650 (2002 census); 60,069 (1989 Soviet census).

Ethnic groups (2021 census):

- Lezgins (31.3%)
- Dargins (17.5%)
- Laks (12.5%)
- Russians (10.5%)
- Avars (10.3%)
- Kumyks (8.6%)
- Tabasarans (4.7%)
- Aghuls (1.2%)
- Azerbaijanis (0.7%)

== Religion ==
Predominant faiths of Kaspiysk city are Sunni Islam and Orthodox Christianity.

=== Russian Orthodox ===
The city belongs to the Diocese of Makhachkala. Kaspiysk parish was formed in 1990 with the blessings of the Metropolitan of Stavropol and Baku, and was officially registered in 1994. In 2000, the community consecrated St. Kazan Church.

=== Seventh Day Adventists ===
In 2010, the Seventh Day Adventists dedicated a house of worship in the city. It became the target of two explosives attacks within two months.

== Economy ==
The city is home to:

- Dagdizel machine-building factory, founded in 1932. It produces diesel engines, electric motors, torpedoes, and other products for the Russian Navy.
- A naval base and harbour is located near the Dagdizel factory
- JSC Caspian Sea precision mechanics - machine-building factory, founded in 1960. It manufactures maritime navigation equipment for military and commercial use.
- a brick factory
- a stone processing factory.

At the North side of the city is a seaport.

== Sports ==
The city hosts the Anzhi Arena stadium, home to the FC Anzhi Makhachkala Russian football club, which competes in the Russian Football Premier League.

The city was to bid to host the 2018 Summer Youth Olympics, however the bid was abandoned due to a lack of government support.

== Notable people ==
- Gaydarbek Gaydarbekov (born 1976), boxer
- Sultan Ibragimov (born 1975), boxer
- Leonid Mikhelson (born 1955), entrepreneur, billionaire
- Magomed Omarow (born 1989), boxer
- Zamira Rakhmanova (born 1985), wrestler
- Albert Selimov (born 1986), boxer
- Ibragim Ibraginov (born 2001), wrestler

== Miscellaneous ==
The city is home to a large naval storage facility that houses Russian hovercraft and ekranoplans.
