= Dagdizel Plant =

Russian torpedo company

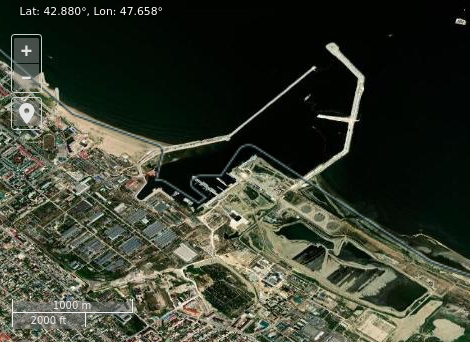
- Satellite imagery of Dagdizel Plant near Kaspiysk naval harbour
- Company type: Open Joint Stock Company
- Founded: 1932
- Headquarters: Kaspiysk, Dagestan, Russia
- Products: Torpedoes
- Revenue: $37.3 million (2017)
- Operating income: $5.95 million (2017)
- Net income: $2.27 million (2017)
- Total assets: $94.3 million (2017)
- Total equity: $24.7 million (2017)
- Owner: Gidropribor (64.3%)
- Parent: Gidropribor (Tactical Missiles Corporation)
- Website: dagdizel.ru

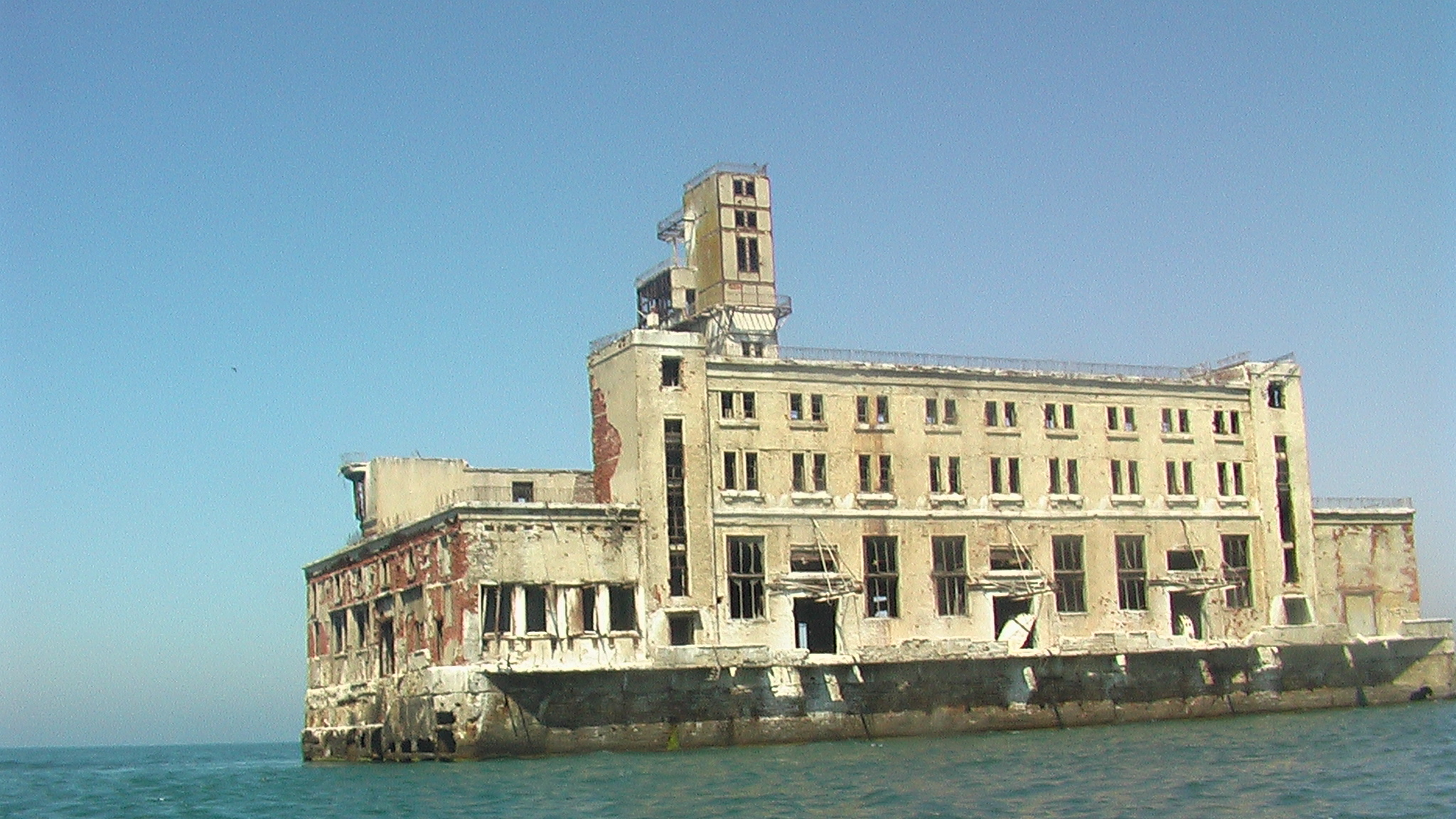
Derelict workshop of the Dagdizel Plant about 2 km out to sea

Dagdizel Plant (Russian: Дагдизель) is a company based in Kaspiysk, Dagestan and established in 1932. It is part of Gidropribor (Tactical Missiles Corporation).

The Dagdizel Plant has long produced naval torpedoes, and also produces diesel generators, shipboard instruments and systems.

== Products ==
- VA-111 Shkval
- Futlyar
