= National day of mourning =

Day marked by mourning and memorial activities

A national day of mourning is a day, or one of several days, marked by mourning and memorial activities observed among the majority of a country's populace. They are designated by the national government. Such days include those marking the death or funeral of a renowned individual or individuals from that country or elsewhere or the anniversary of such a death or deaths, wartime commemorations, or the occurrence or anniversary of a significant disaster either in the country or in another country. Flying a national or military flag of that country at half-mast is a common symbol.

Sociologically, period of national mourning are understood "as instituting states of social exception during which state authorities enact ritual actions consisting in a sequence of choreographically staged performative acts meant to create a national community of grief in the face of what is framed as a socially meaningful loss."

== List ==
The following are lists for national days of mourning across the world:

- Before 2000
- 2000–2019
- 2020–present

== Selected list of figures recognized ==
=== State officials ===
- National days of mourning are typically declared for presidents of the United States, usually on the day of their funerals. Beginning with the November 25, 1963, mourning of John F. Kennedy following his assassination, these days are also considered federal holidays. There was no official day of mourning for Herbert Hoover.
- In the Soviet Union, an official mourning period was reserved for the deaths of leaders or former leaders, with Alexei Rykov, Nikita Khrushchev and Georgy Malenkov being notable exceptions after Rykov was executed during the Great Purge and the other two were relegated to obscurity. Khrushchev's death was announced only hours before he was buried without full state honors, while Malenkov's death was publicly announced more than 2 weeks after he died. This custom changed in 1968 when a national day of mourning was declared for Soviet cosmonaut Yuri Gagarin, the first human to journey into outer space. In the final years of the Soviet Union, official mourning was declared for 2 disasters: the 1988 Armenian earthquake and the Ufa train disaster.
- Presidents of Mexico, usually on the day of their funerals. These days are usually considered municipal and religious holidays in Mexico City and federal holidays in the rest of the republic. Miguel de la Madrid in 2012 was the most recent.

== International days of mourning ==
A similar but rarely-used concept exists at the European Union-level and Arab League-level and are called a European Day of Mourning and Arab League Day of Mourning. The European Commission first introduced the concept on 12 September 2001, when a day of mourning was declared across EU member states for the victims of the September 11 terrorist attacks in the United States. A second and third day of mourning was held in April 2010 for the victims of Smolensk air disaster in Russia and in November 2015 for the victims of the Paris attacks. Arab League has declared days of mourning for four times until October 2023. Other organizations such as the African Union, Union of South American Nations, etc., have also announced international days of mourning.

== Remembrance events ==
While not the same as a national day of mourning, some remembrance events and protests are called a "day of mourning".

- National Day of Mourning (Bangladesh), held 15 August. In 1975 Sheikh Mujibur Rahman was killed by a group of army personnel, along with his family.
- Circassian Day of Mourning, held May 21, commemorating the Circassian genocide and the Circassian defeat in the Russian-Circassian War
- Day of Mourning (Australia), annual protest of Aboriginal and Torres Strait Islander Australians held on Australia Day, 26 January
- National Day of Mourning (United States protest), an American Indian protest held on the fourth Thursday of November
- National Day of Mourning (Canadian observance), held 28 April, a commemoration of workers killed or injured on the job
- Nakba Day, annual commemoration of the 1948 Palestinian expulsion and flight on 15 May by Palestinians worldwide.
