= 1996 Kaspiysk bombing =

1996 terrorist attack in Russia

- Part of the Chechen–Russian conflict
- 1996 Kaspiysk bombing (Republic of Dagestan)
- Location: 42°53′45.32″N 47°37′39.77″E; Kaspiysk, Dagestan, Russia
- Date: November 16, 1996
- Deaths: 68
- Perpetrator: Chechen rebels

The 1996 Kaspiysk bombing occurred on 16 November 1996 when Chechen terrorists bombed an apartment building in Kaspiysk, Dagestan, killing 68 people.

== Background ==
The apartment had been built in 1991, and at the time of the bombing around 200 people lived in the housing. It had been one of the buildings of the Volna boarding house until 1992-1993 when the Caspian border detachment was created and the housing was transferred to city authorities.

== Bombing ==
The explosion occurred at around 2 a.m. UTC+03:00 at house No. 58 on Lenin Street in the basement. The bombing destroyed the entire nine-story apartment.

Local emergency services arrived at 2:30 a.m. to rescue people until the arrival of a task force and rescuers of the Russian Emergencies Ministry, additional specialists also arrived on 19 November along with professional rescuers from the Central Airmobile Rescue Squad and the Special Purpose Center in Moscow.

In total, 68 people died, including 21 children. The target of the explosion is suspected to be against Russian Border Guard officers who were living inside with their families.

== Investigation ==
FSB Director Nikolay Kovalyov stated soon after that a suspect was detained and the identities of two accomplices were known, which was confirmed by the Transcaucasian Border District. Ivan Rybkin stated that the people responsible for the attack were opponents of the Chechen peace process, a claim reiterated by the Chechen coalition government. It was also estimated that the explosive device had the power of 30-150 kg of TNT. The names of the suspects were never released, and in November 2003 the FSB announced the case was suspended

== Response ==
Boris Yeltsin declared a national day of mourning in response to the attack. Two days after the attack Viktor Chernomyrdin visited Kaspiysk.

== See also ==
- Russian apartment bombings
