= Arab League Day of Mourning =

Tribute of Arab leaders Death

An Arab League Day of Mourning is a day marked by mourning and memorial activities in member states of the Arab League. They are declared by the union and are separate from national days of mourning, which are designated at the national level. As of April 2025, the Arab League has declared Days of Mourning five times.

== Background ==
The concept was introduced on 4 August 2005 by the Arab League in Cairo, a day after the death of King Fahd of Saudi Arabia. The Arab League declared three days of mourning, and an Arab summit scheduled in Egypt was cancelled. Later, three days of mourning were observed for the death of Emirs of Kuwait Jaber in 2006 and Sabah in 2020.

== List ==
Year	Days of mourning	Reason	Notes
2005	3	Death of King Fahd of Saudi Arabia	
2006	3	Death of Emir of Kuwait Jaber Al-Ahmad Al-Sabah	
2020	3	Death of Emir of Kuwait Sabah Al-Ahmad Al-Jaber Al-Sabah	
2022	3	Death of President of UAE Khalifa bin Zayed Al Nahyan	
2023	3	Victims of the Al-Ahli Arab Hospital explosion	

== See also ==
- National day of mourning, a similar concept at the national level
- International day of mourning, a similar concept at the international level
- European Day of Mourning, a similar concept at the EU level
