= European Day of Mourning =

Mourning and memorial event

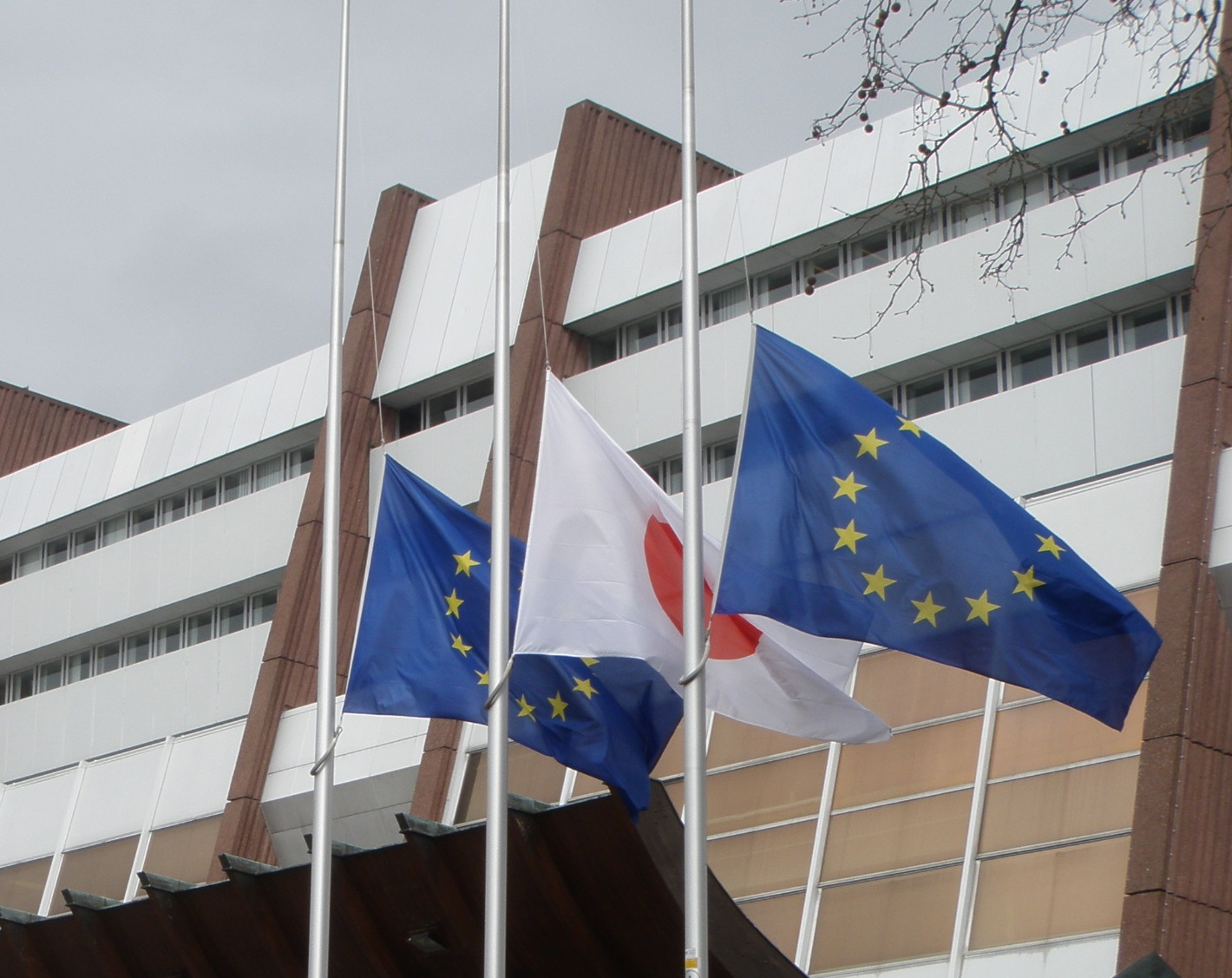
The Flag of Europe and the Japanese flag at half-staff.

A European Day of Mourning is a day marked by mourning and memorial activities in member states of the European Union. They are declared by the union and are separate from national days of mourning, which are designated at the national level. As of 2026, there have been three European Days of Mourning.

== Background ==
The European Commission introduced the concept on 12 September 2001, a day after the terrorist attacks in the United States. The commission, together with the European Council and the European Parliament, agreed on a joint statement to condemn the attacks and designated 14 September 2001 as a day of mourning in member states and EU institutions. European citizens were asked to join in three minutes of silence.

A second European Day of Mourning was observed on 12 April 2010, two days after the Smolensk air disaster which led to the deaths of Polish President Lech Kaczyński, First Lady Maria Kaczyńska, former President in exile Ryszard Kaczorowski, Chief of Polish General Staff Franciszek Gągor and other Polish government officials.

A third European Day of Mourning was held on 13 November 2015, for victims of the terrorist attacks in Paris. All European citizens were further asked to join in one minute of silence on 16 November. Citizens and politicians gathered in a number of countries to mark the moment of silence, including in France, Germany, Belgium, Luxembourg, the United Kingdom, and Turkey. In the Netherlands, trains and buses stopped to mark the minute's silence, take-offs at Schiphol Airport were briefly suspended, and programming on radio and television was paused for one minute. The moment of silence was disrupted with shouts of "Allahu akbar", among other disruptions, at some Dutch schools.

== List ==
Year	Days of mourning	Reason	Notes
2001	1	Victims of the September 11 attacks	Three minutes of silence.
2010	1	Victims of the Smolensk air disaster in Russia	One minute of silence at NATO headquarters in Brussels.
2015	1	Victims of the November 2015 Paris attacks	One minute of silence.

== See also ==
- National day of mourning, a similar concept at the national level
- International day of mourning, a similar concept at the international level
- Arab League Day of Mourning, a similar concept at the Arab League level
