= International day of mourning =

Day marked by mourning and memorial activities

An international day of mourning is a day, or one of several days, marked by mourning and memorial activities observed among countries under an intergovernmental organization. They are designated by the intergovernmental organization. Such days include those marking the death or funeral of a renowned individual or individuals from a country of that organization or elsewhere or the anniversary of such a death or deaths, the anniversaries of a significant natural or man-made disaster occurring in the country of the organization, wartime commemorations or in memory of the victims of a terrorist attack. Common symbols include flying the organization's flag at half-mast and observing minutes of silence.

== Background ==
The concept was first introduced by European Commission in September 2001 after the terrorist attacks in the United States. The commission, together with the European Council and the European Parliament, designated 14 September 2001 as a day of mourning in member states and EU institutions. European citizens were asked to join in three minutes of silence. The Arab League observed three days of mourning for the death of King Fahd of Saudi Arabia on 4 August 2005. After these, many organizations observed day of international mourning for several times.

== List ==
Organization	Year	Days	Reason	Notes	Ref.
European Union	2001	1	Victims of the September 11 attacks	Three minutes of silence.	
Arab League	2005	3	Death of King Fahd of Saudi Arabia		
Arab League	2006	3	Death of Emir of Kuwait Jaber Al-Ahmad Al-Sabah		
Economic Community of West African States	2009	30	Death of President of Gabon Omar Bongo		
European Union	2010	1	Victims of the Smolensk air disaster in Russia	One minute of silence at NATO headquarters in Brussels.	
Union of South American Nations	2010	1	Death of former President of Argentina Néstor Kirchner		
African Union	2013	3	Death of former President of South Africa Nelson Mandela		
European Union	2015	1	Victims of the November 2015 Paris attacks	One minute of silence.	
African Union	2019	3	Victims of the crash of Ethiopian Airlines Flight 302		
African Union	2019	3	Death of President of Tunisia Beji Caid Essebsi		
East African Community	2020	3	Death of former President of Tanzania Benjamin Mkapa		
Arab League	2020	3	Death of Emir of Kuwait Sabah Al-Ahmad Al-Jaber Al-Sabah		
Caribbean Community	2021	4	Assassination of President of Haiti Jovenel Moïse	CARICOM Standard and national flags were flown at half-staff for 3 days starting from Wednesday July 7 to Friday July 9 and on funeral day of Haitian president.	
Arab League	2022	3	Death of President of UAE Khalifa bin Zayed Al Nahyan	Arab League flag lowered at half-mast	
Arab League	2023	3	Victims of the Al-Ahli Arab Hospital explosion		

== See also ==
- National day of mourning, a similar concept at the national level
- European Day of Mourning, a similar concept at the EU level
- Arab League Day of Mourning, a similar concept at the Arab League level
