= Death and state funeral of Kwame Nkrumah =

April 1972 state funeral in Ghana

State funeral of Kwame Nkrumah
- Date: April 27, 1972
- Location: Ghana

Kwame Nkrumah, the first President of Ghana, died on April 27, 1972, at the Flamingo Hotel in Bucharest, the capital of Romania. Nkrumah died of an unknown but apparently incurable sickness. His body came back to Ghana where he had achieved independence in 1957 and had ruled the country approximately 13 years. Thousands of Ghanaians attended the funeral to bury the president.

== Background ==
Nkrumah disappeared from the public eye in Ghana after being overthrown by a coup d’état in February 1966 and had since been living in the Guinean capital of Conakry laying low. Nkrumah suffered from an unknown sickness, with sources not mentioning the kind of disease. After he got sick, he was transferred to Bucharest, the capital of Romania, for better medication and treatment. However, after doctors and nurses tried their best, Nkrumah's sickness persisted, leading him to death. On 27 April 1972, Nkrumah died.

== Return of his body ==
On July 7, the remains of Nkrumah were transported back to Ghana aboard a specially arranged Guinean Air Force aircraft. Following his passing, negotiations between Ghana's National Redemption Council and President Ahmed Sékou Touré of Guinea facilitated the repatriation of Nkrumah's body. Initially, Touré declined Ghana's requests for the repatriation, opting instead to grant Nkrumah a state funeral in Conakry, Guinea's capital. All flags to be flown at half-staff in honor of the former President until his interment. Nkrumah's remains lay in state the following day before being transported to his home town of Nkroful for burial.

== Funeral ==
The funeral proceedings were carried by Radio Conakry, also known as the "Voice of the Revolution", which was Guinea’s national radio.
