= Death and state funeral of Hastings Banda =

November 1997 state funeral in Malawi

State funeral of Kamuzu Banda
- Date: 25 November 1997
- Location: Lilongwe, Malawi

Hastings Banda, the first President of Malawi, died on 25 November 1997 in Johannesburg, South Africa. Thousands of Malawians gathered in Lilongwe to bury the president. The funeral took over four hours at the State House followed by a speech of the president, Bakili Muluzi. Muluzi's speech was accompanied by religious ceremonies attended by African heads of states, notably President of Zimbabwe, Robert Mugabe, with his vice-president, Joshua Nkomo, and Botswanan President Quett Masire. In his eulogy, Muluzi said that sorrows had surrounded the country as it had lost one of the most powerful leaders in its history. Cecilia Tamanda Kadzamira, Banda's long-time companion, among other relatives were the first to lay their wreaths on the president's grave. Banda was given different heroic names such as the Conqueror, and the Messiah.

== Background ==
Banda suffered from heart failure for several years. He was admitted to the Queen Elizabeth Hospital in Blantyre before being transferred to South Africa. Banda died in South Africa on 25 November 1997.

He was laid to rest on 3 December 1997. African heads of states attended the funeral. Nelson Mandela, the South African then-president, did not attend the funeral despite the fact that Banda had sent a financial contribution to the African National Congress after Mandela was released from prison in 1990. Other African leaders did attend the funeral, including Robert Mugabe, Kenneth Kaunda, and Joaquim Chissano.

== Funeral and burial service ==
Banda's funeral took place in Lilongwe after his body had embarked from South Africa. Thousands of Malawian citizens came out to show their last respects. Banda was laid to rest on 3 December 1997. It was claimed by MCP's treasurer general, Dr. Hetherwick Ntaba that the casket in which Banda was buried would take over a century before it would start rusting. The casket was said to have been purchased from the United States and had been selectively chosen to meet embalming done by special undertakers in South Africa, where the president died. Ntaba insisted that the bronze casket was purchased for K717,000 (SAR 196,000) could stay up to a century without showing signs of rust.

The first steel casket going at about K184,000 (SAR 54,000) was discarded due to durability issues. The body was embalmed before being buried in a concrete grave to avoid any damages to the president's body as well as the casket for historical purposes just like the former Kenyan president Jomo Kenyata was buried. In 2006, the Kamuzu Mausoleum was established.

== Attendees ==
Dignitaries
Country	Title	Name
Malawi	President	Bakili Muluzi
Botswana	President	Quett Masire
Mozambique	President	Joaquim Chissano
Zimbabwe	President	Robert Mugabe
Zimbabwe	Vice President	Joshua Nkomo
Angola	Vice President	Bornito de Sousa
Zambia	Former President	Kenneth Kaunda

== See also ==
- Hastings Banda
