= List of national days of mourning (2000–2019) =

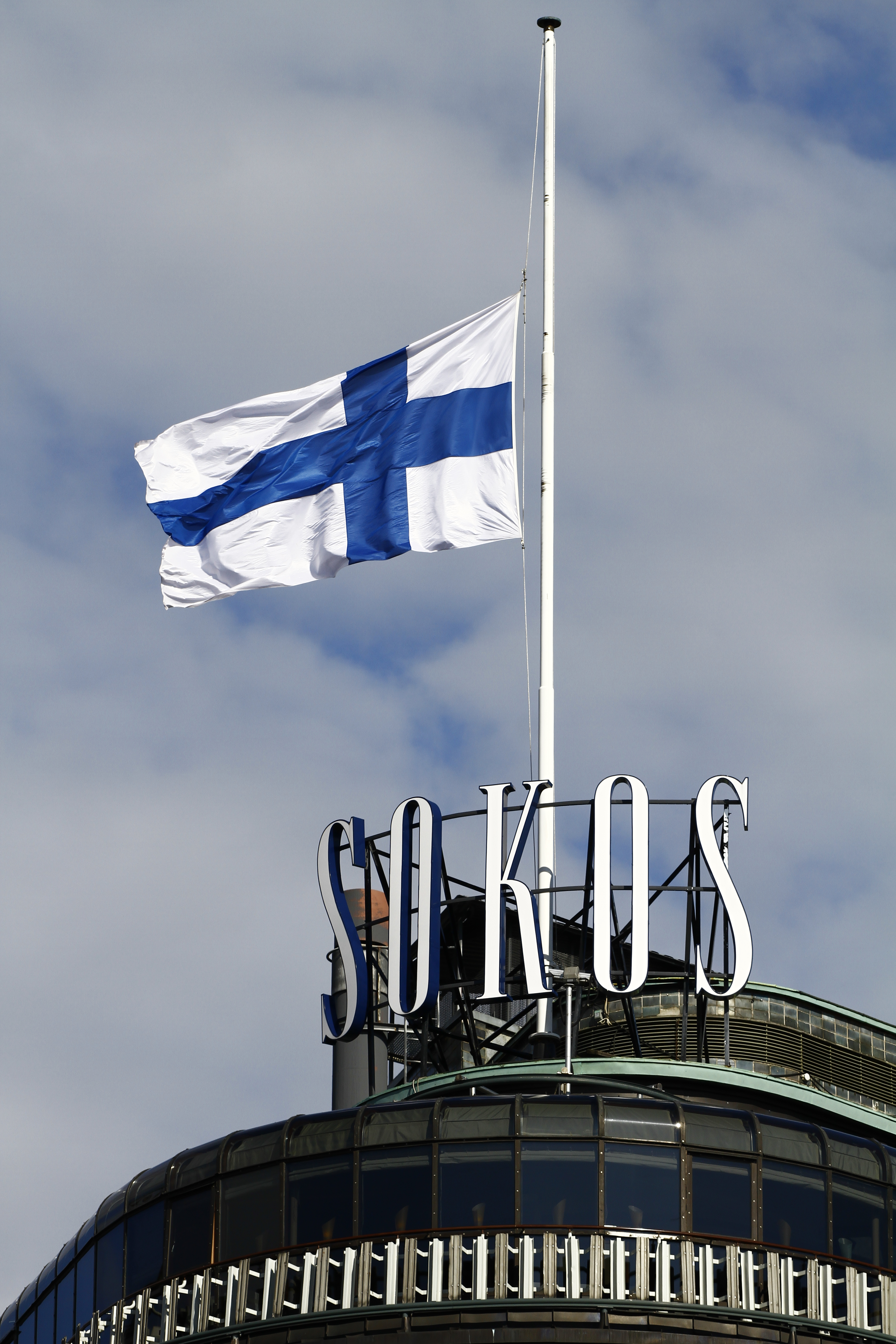
Finnish flag at half-staff due to the 2011 Norway attacks.

This is a list of national days of mourning between 2000 and 2019. It does not include annual remembrance events.

== 2000–2004 ==
Country	Year	Days	Reason	Notes
Spain	2000	7	Death of Queen Mother Princess María de las Mercedes of Bourbon-Two Sicilies	
Lebanon	2000	3	Death of former Prime Minister Saeb Salam	
Ukraine	2000	2	Victims of a tragedy at a mine in Sukhodilsk	
Tunisia	2000	7	Death of first President of Tunisia Habib Bourguiba	
Algeria	2000	3	Death of first President of Tunisia Habib Bourguiba	
Democratic Republic of the Congo	2000	At least 2	Victims of the 2000 N'djili Airport explosion	
Sierra Leone	2000	7	Death of Maxwell Khobe	
Syria	2000	40	Death of President of Syria Hafez al-Assad	All television stations interrupted normal programming and radio stations played mournful music, theatres, entertainment places were closed, and concerts were canceled. On the day of the funeral, shops, schools, banks and other offices were closed, and the city's normally busy traffic was absent.
Lebanon	2000	7	Death of President of Syria Hafez al-Assad	State and private television stations played classical music, recitations from the Quran and clips from Syrian state television related to his death. Flags were to fly at half mast above all Lebanese official institutions and buildings. Theatres, restaurants, and clubs have cancelled their programmes in an act of respect. Lebanese government has also announced its schools, universities and technical institutions will be closed on Tuesday, when Assad's funeral is due to take place.
Egypt	2000	3	Death of President of Syria Hafez al-Assad	
Morocco	2000	3	Death of President of Syria Hafez al-Assad	
Libya	2000	3	Death of President of Syria Hafez al-Assad	During this period, flags flew on half masts, and two TV and radio stations in Libya broadcast religious programs in honor of Al-Assad.
Jordan	2000	3	Death of President of Syria Hafez al-Assad	
UAE	2000	3	Death of President of Syria Hafez al-Assad	
Iran	2000	3	Death of President of Syria Hafez al-Assad	
Palestine	2000	3	Death of President of Syria Hafez al-Assad	
Oman	2000	3	Death of President of Syria Hafez al-Assad	
Yemen	2000	3	Death of President of Syria Hafez al-Assad	
Kuwait	2000	3	Death of President of Syria Hafez al-Assad	
Qatar	2000	3	Death of President of Syria Hafez al-Assad	
Brazil	2000	3	Death of Barbosa Lima Sobrinho	
Germany	2000	1	Victims of the Air France Flight 4590	96 German citizens were among those killed.
Russia	2000	1	Victims of the Kursk submarine disaster	
Bahrain	2000	3	Victims of Gulf Air Flight 072	
Bahamas	2000	10	Death of first prime minister Lynden Pindling	
Mauritius	2000	1	Death of first president Veerasamy Ringadoo	
United States Virgin Islands	2000	2	Death of Harold Thompson Jr	
Cuba	2000	3	Death of former Prime Minister of Canada Pierre Trudeau	
Sri Lanka	2000	2	Death of former prime minister Sirimavo Bandaranaike	Government had declared Friday and Saturday days of mourning and ordered the closing of all movie theaters, liquor stores, bars and butcher shops. He called on citizens to put up white flags of mourning.
Ivory Coast	2000	1	Victims of Clashes	
Austria	2000	2	Victims of the Kaprun disaster	
Tuvalu	2000	4	Death of prime minister Ionatana Ionatana	
Democratic Republic of the Congo	2001	30	Assassination of President Laurent-Désiré Kabila	A 30-day period of national mourning was announced. Monday, January 22 and Tuesday, January 23, were declared bank holidays.
Zimbabwe	2001	3	Assassination of President Laurent-Désiré Kabila	
FR Yugoslavia	2001	1	Victims of the Podujevo bus bombing	18 February declared national day of mourning.
Portugal	2001	2	Victims of the Hintze Ribeiro Bridge disaster	
Andorra	2001	2	Death of Enric Paris Torres	
Brazil	2001	7	Death of Mário Covas	
Ghana	2001	3	Victims of the 2001 Accra stampede	
Nepal	2001	13	Victims of the Nepalese royal massacre	
India	2001	3	Victims of the Nepalese royal massacre	
Bhutan	2001	3	Victims of the Nepalese royal massacre	
Bangladesh	2001	1	Victims of the Nepalese royal massacre	
Sri Lanka	2001	1	Victims of the Nepalese royal massacre	
Russia	2001	1	Victims of the crash of Vladivostok Air Flight 352	
Tanzania	2001	7	Death of Vice-President of Tanzania Omar Ali Juma	
Portugal	2001	2	Death of former President Francisco da Costa Gomes	
Brazil	2001	3	Death of Jorge Amado	
Macedonia	2001	1	Victims of the Battle of Tetovo	9 August 2001 declared a national day of mourning
Ukraine	2001	1	Victims of a tragedy at mine in Donetsk	
Portugal	2001	3	Victims of the September 11 attacks	
Poland	2001	3	Victims of the September 11 attacks	Several Polish citizens were among those killed.
Argentina	2001	3	Victims of the September 11 attacks	
Brazil	2001	3	Victims of the September 11 attacks	
Dominican Republic	2001	3	Victims of the September 11 attacks	
Gambia	2001	3	Victims of the September 11 attacks	
Liberia	2001	3	Victims of the September 11 attacks	
El Salvador	2001	3	Victims of the September 11 attacks	
Guatemala	2001	3	Victims of the September 11 attacks	
Costa Rica	2001	2	Victims of the September 11 attacks	
Paraguay	2001	2	Victims of the September 11 attacks	
United States	2001	1	Victims of the September 11 attacks	Almost all TV and radio stations interrupted regular programming on news of the attacks. Many states declared a state of emergency. After the terrorist attacks, in fear of further attacks and as a gesture of respect for the victims, government institutions, offices, banks, schools, universities and the stock exchange were closed for a few days. Many public events, film screenings, theater performances, concerts, entertainment venues and many major sporting events in North America were cancelled. President George W. Bush proclaimed September 14, 2001, a "National Day of Prayer and Remembrance."
Canada	2001	1	Victims of the September 11 attacks	
European Union	2001	1	Victims of the September 11 attacks	EU leaders declared 14 September a European Day of Mourning across all member states. Citizens were asked to observe 3 minutes of silence at midday CET.
France	2001	1	Victims of the September 11 attacks	
Ireland	2001	1	Victims of the September 11 attacks	Schools and businesses were closed across the country and all sports, public functions and entertainment were canceled.
Romania	2001	1	Victims of the September 11 attacks	
Latvia	2001	1	Victims of the September 11 attacks	
Czech Republic	2001	1	Victims of the September 11 attacks	
Cyprus	2001	1	Victims of the September 11 attacks	
Croatia	2001	1	Victims of the September 11 attacks	
Albania	2001	1	Victims of the September 11 attacks	
Greece	2001	1	Victims of the September 11 attacks	
Israel	2001	1	Victims of the September 11 attacks	
South Korea	2001	1	Victims of the September 11 attacks	
Philippines	2001	1	Victims of the September 11 attacks	
Slovenia	2001	1	Victims of the September 11 attacks	
Bulgaria	2001	1	Victims of the September 11 attacks	
Turkey	2001	1	Victims of the September 11 attacks	
Tanzania	2001	1	Victims of the September 11 attacks	
Togo	2001	1	Victims of the September 11 attacks	
Equatorial Guinea	2001	1	Victims of the September 11 attacks	
Brazil	2001	3	Death of Roberto Campos	
Mozambique	2001	1	Death of Oswaldo Assahel Tazama	
Suriname	2001	3	Death of Chairman of the National Assembly Jagernath Lachmon	
Dominican Republic	2001	3	Death of former President Juan Bosch	
Malaysia	2001	7	Death of King Salahuddin of Selangor	First time national mourning was observed in the country since 1964 and is the second of three times national mourning was announced in Malaysia.
Bulgaria	2001	1	7 children killed in a stampede in front of a disco bar in Sofia	
Zambia	2001	1	Death of first Prime minister Mainza Chona	
Senegal	2001	15	Death of first President of Senegal Léopold Sédar Senghor	Many cultural, entertainment and sports events have been canceled.
Togo	2001	3	Death of first President of Senegal Léopold Sédar Senghor	
Central African Republic	2001	2	Death of first President of Senegal Léopold Sédar Senghor	
Peru	2001/2	2	Victims of the Mesa Redonda fire	
India	2002	2	Death of G M C Balayogi	
United Kingdom	2002	10	Death of Queen Elizabeth the Queen Mother	
Canada	2002	1	Death of Queen Elizabeth the Queen Mother	
Philippines	2002	1	Death of Levi Celerio	
Philippines	2002	1	Death of Lucio San Pedro	
Somaliland	2002	7	Death of President Muhammad Haji Ibrahim Egal	
Nigeria	2002	2	Victims of the crash of EAS Airlines Flight 4226	
Bolivia	2002	30	Death of former president Hugo Banzer	
Mozambique	2002	3	Victims of the Tenga rail disaster	
Tanzania	2002	2	Victims of the Igandu train collision	
Ukraine	2002	1	Victims of a tragedy at a mine in Ukrainsk	
Afghanistan	2002	1	Assassination of Vice President of Afghanistan Haji Abdul Qadeer	July 9th is the day of national mourning. Flags were flown at half-mast.
Dominican Republic	2002	3	Death of former President Joaquín Balaguer	
Ukraine	2002	1	Victims of the Sknyliv air show disaster	
Ukraine	2002	1	Victims of a tragedy at a mine in Donetsk	
Russia	2002	1	Victims of the 2002 Khankala Mi-26 crash	
Senegal	2002	3	Victims of the sinking of the MV Le Joola	
Finland	2002	1	Victims of the Myyrmanni bombing	
Australia	2002	1	Victims of the Bali bombings	20 October declares national day of mourning. 202 people were killed in the attacks, including 88 Australian citizens.
Russia	2002	1	Victims of the Moscow theater hostage crisis	
Ukraine	2002	1	Victims of crash of Aeromist-Kharkiv Flight 2137	
Nauru	2003	At least 2	Death of president Bernard Dowiyogo	Flags at half mast.
Serbia and Montenegro	2003	3	Assassination of Prime Minister Zoran Đinđić	
Republic of Srpska	2003	1	Assassination of Prime Minister Zoran Đinđić	
American Samoa	2003	1	Death of governor Tauese Sunia	
Serbia and Montenegro	2003	1	Victims of Goraždevac murders	
Brazil	2003	3	Death of former Vice President Aureliano Chaves	
Spain	2003	2	Victims of the UM Airlines Flight 4230	
Philippines	2003	2	Death of former Vice President Emmanuel Pelaez	
Brazil	2003	3	Death of Roberto Marinho	
Brazil	2003	3	Death of Sérgio Vieira de Mello	
Kenya	2003	14	Death of vice president Michael Kijana Wamalwa	
Italy	2003	1	Victims of the Nasiriyah bombing	18 Italian troops, including 12 Carabinieri policemen were killed in the blast along with an Italian civilian. A further 20 Italians and 80 Iraqis were wounded. November 18 The day of the state funeral of the fallen soldiers was a day of national mourning.
Central African Republic	2003	30	Death of 1st President David Dacko	
Azerbaijan	2003	7	Death of former President Heydar Aliyev	All public entertainment was cancelled, and foreign television channels and radio stations were taken off the air.
Benin	2003	3	Victims of the crash of UTA Flight 141	
Lebanon	2003	2	Victims of the crash of UTA Flight 141	
Bangladesh	2003	1	Victims of the crash of UTA Flight 141	
Bulgaria	2003	1	Bulgarian soldiers killed in the 2003 Karbala bombings	
Dominica	2004	11	Death of prime minister Pierre Charles	National mourning on January 7-17.
Philippines	2004	7	Death of former vice president Salvador Laurel	
Macedonia	2004	3	Death of President of Macedonia Boris Trajkovski	The president died in a plane crash.
Bosnia and Herzegovina	2004	1	Death of President of Macedonia Boris Trajkovski	
Comoros	2004	3	Victims of Cyclone Gafilo	
Madagascar	2004	1	Victims of Cyclone Gafilo	
Argentina	2004	3	Victims of the 2004 Madrid train bombings	
Spain	2004	3	Victims of the 2004 Madrid train bombings	National mourning from 12 to 14 March. The flags were lowered half-mast. Television and radio stations canceled entertainment programs. Many public events were canceled as a sign of respect for the victims of the bombings. 130 Spanish citizens were among those killed
Costa Rica	2004	2	Victims of the 2004 Madrid train bombings	
Poland	2004	2	Victims of the 2004 Madrid train bombings	National mourning on March 12 and 13. Flags lowered half-mast. 4 Polish citizens were among those killed.
Portugal	2004	1	Victims of the 2004 Madrid train bombings	March 12 is the day of national mourning. The flags were lowered half-mast.
Romania	2004	1	Victims of the 2004 Madrid train bombings	March 14 is the day of national mourning. Flags lowered half-mast. 16 Romanian citizens were among those killed
Palestine	2004	3	Assassination of Hamas leader Ahmed Yassin	
Serbia and Montenegro	2004	1	Victims of the 2004 unrest in Kosovo	Day of mourning declared separately by the Government of Serbia and of Montenegro.
Fiji	2004	1	Death of first President Kamisese Mara	
Bulgaria	2004	1	Victims of a bus accident in the Lim river	
Philippines	2004	1	Death of Nick Joaquin	
Philippines	2004	1	Death of Jose M. Maceda	
United States	2004	1	Death of former U.S. President Ronald Reagan	Federal agencies and departments were closed.
Portugal	2004	1	Death of former Minister António de Sousa Franco	
Gabon	2004	3	Victims of Gabon Express Flight 221	
Brazil	2004	3	Death of Leonel Brizola	
Austria	2004	4	Death of President of Austria Thomas Klestil	
Portugal	2004	1	Death of Carlos Paredes	
Ukraine	2004	2	Victims of a tragedy at a mine in Rodynske	
Costa Rica	2004	3	Victims of the 2004 Costa Rica hostage crisis	During a hostage crisis in July 2004, a Costa Rican policeman shot and killed three people inside the Chilean embassy and then turned the gun on himself after learning he was to lose his job protecting the embassy. National flags were lowered to half-mast for a period of three days.
Belgium	2004	1	Victims of an explosion at an industrial park in Ath	
Paraguay	2004	3	Victims of the Ycuá Bolaños supermarket fire	
Russia	2004	1	Victims of the 2004 Russian aircraft bombings	
Nepal	2004	1	12 Nepalese hostages killed in Iraq	
Russia	2004	2	Victims of the Beslan school siege	
Portugal	2004	1	Death of President of Portuguese Constitutional court Luís Nunes de Almeida	
Greece	2004	3	Death of Patriarch Peter VII of Alexandria	
United Arab Emirates	2004	40	Death of President of the United Arab Emirates Zayed bin Sultan Al Nahyan	At the time of the announcement of the president's death, radio and TV stations were broadcasting Koranic verses, and schools, ministries, businesses and other offices were closed for several days.
Jordan	2004	40	Death of President of the United Arab Emirates Zayed bin Sultan Al Nahyan	
Bahrain	2004	40	Death of President of the United Arab Emirates Zayed bin Sultan Al Nahyan	Entertainment shows and concerts have been banned.
Yemen	2004	3	Death of President of the United Arab Emirates Zayed bin Sultan Al Nahyan	
Algeria	2004	3	Death of President of the United Arab Emirates Zayed bin Sultan Al Nahyan	
Libya	2004	3	Death of President of the United Arab Emirates Zayed bin Sultan Al Nahyan	Flags were lowered to half mast and all ceremonies and events were canceled.
Lebanon	2004	3	Death of President of the United Arab Emirates Zayed bin Sultan Al Nahyan	State flags at all government, ministerial and public facilities were lowered to half-mast. Radio and television stations in Lebanon stopped broadcasting their regular programs and replaced them with verses from the Koran and classical music.
Pakistan	2004	3	Death of President of the United Arab Emirates Zayed bin Sultan Al Nahyan	
Palestine	2004	40	Death of PNA President Yasser Arafat	For three days, shops, schools, offices and businesses were closed.
Cuba	2004	3	Death of PNA President Yasser Arafat	
Egypt	2004	3	Death of PNA President Yasser Arafat	
Jordan	2004	3	Death of PNA President Yasser Arafat	State-run Jordan radio and television replaced regular programming with recitations of Quranic verses interrupted only by hourly news bulletins. Suspension of operations of departments and offices
Lebanon	2004	3	Death of PNA President Yasser Arafat	
Libya	2004	3	Death of PNA President Yasser Arafat	
Morocco	2004	3	Death of PNA President Yasser Arafat	
Mauritania	2004	3	Death of PNA President Yasser Arafat	National flags have been lowered to half-mast on government and public buildings. Mauritanian radio and television have ceased regular official broadcasting, replacing it with recitations from the Quran.
North Korea	2004	3	Death of PNA President Yasser Arafat	
India	2004	3	Death of PNA President Yasser Arafat	All flags on government buildings have flown at half-mast and official functions have been cancelled.
Pakistan	2004	3	Death of PNA President Yasser Arafat	
Bangladesh	2004	3	Death of PNA President Yasser Arafat	National flags lowered half-mast.
Algeria	2004	3	Death of PNA President Yasser Arafat	
Qatar	2004	3	Death of PNA President Yasser Arafat	
Tunisia	2004	3	Death of PNA President Yasser Arafat	
Yemen	2004	3	Death of PNA President Yasser Arafat	
Brazil	2004	3	Death of Celso Furtado	
India	2004	7	Death of former Prime Minister P V Narasimha Rao	
Marshall Islands	2004/5	7	Victims of the 2004 Indian Ocean earthquake and tsunami	
Maldives	2004/5	At least 3	Victims of the 2004 Indian Ocean earthquake and tsunami	
Indonesia	2004/5	3	Victims of the 2004 Indian Ocean earthquake and tsunami	
Thailand	2004/5	3	Victims of the 2004 Indian Ocean earthquake and tsunami	
Australia	2004/5	1	Victims of the 2004 Indian Ocean earthquake and tsunami	
Philippines	2004/5	1	Victims of the 2004 Indian Ocean earthquake and tsunami	
Sri Lanka	2004/5	1	Victims of the 2004 Indian Ocean earthquake and tsunami	
Albania	2004/5	1	Victims of the 2004 Indian Ocean earthquake and tsunami	
Malta	2004/5	1	Victims of the 2004 Indian Ocean earthquake and tsunami	
Switzerland	2004/5	1	Victims of the 2004 Indian Ocean earthquake and tsunami	
Finland	2004/5	1	Victims of the 2004 Indian Ocean earthquake and tsunami	
Norway	2004/5	1	Victims of the 2004 Indian Ocean earthquake and tsunami	
Sweden	2004/5	1	Victims of the 2004 Indian Ocean earthquake and tsunami	
Denmark	2004/5	1	Victims of the 2004 Indian Ocean earthquake and tsunami	Only time national mourning was declared in Denmark.
Germany	2004/5	1	Victims of the 2004 Indian Ocean earthquake and tsunami	
Poland	2004/5	1	Victims of the 2004 Indian Ocean earthquake and tsunami	
Czech Republic	2004/5	1	Victims of the 2004 Indian Ocean earthquake and tsunami	
Canada	2004/5	1	Victims of the 2004 Indian Ocean earthquake and tsunami	
Guyana	2004/5	1	Victims of the 2004 Indian Ocean earthquake and tsunami	
São Tomé and Príncipe	2004/5	1	Victims of the 2004 Indian Ocean earthquake and tsunami	National mourning on January 11.
Argentina	2004/5	3	Victims of the Cromañón nightclub fire	

== 2005–2009 ==
Country	Year	Days	Reason	Notes
Luxembourg	2005	6	Death of Princess Joséphine Charlotte of Belgium	
Portugal	2005	1	Death of President of Portuguese Supreme Court of Justice Jorge Alberto Aragão Seia	
Georgia	2005	2	Death of Prime Minister of Georgia Zurab Zhvania	
Togo	2005	60	Death of President of Togo Gnassingbé Eyadéma	
Portugal	2005	1	Death of Sister Lucia	
Lebanon	2005	3	Assassination of former Prime Minister of Lebanon Rafic Hariri	Schools, shops and offices closed for three days of official mourning.
Holy See	2005	9	Death of Pope John Paul II	
Brazil	2005	7	Death of Pope John Paul II	
Nicaragua	2005	7	Death of Pope John Paul II	
Poland	2005	6	Death of Pope John Paul II	At the time of the Pope's death, all television stations suspended their normal schedules, devoted most of the airtime to current events in the Vatican and memories of the deceased pope, and throughout the entire mourning week, Polish music television presented calm, subdued music. Theaters, cinemas and entertainment venues were closed. Exhibitions, concerts and sport's games were cancelled. Schools, banks, offices, companies and shopping centers were closed on the day of the funeral.
Venezuela	2005	5	Death of Pope John Paul II	
Lithuania	2005	5	Death of Pope John Paul II	
Philippines	2005	5	Death of Pope John Paul II	
Paraguay	2005	5	Death of Pope John Paul II	
Gabon	2005	5	Death of Pope John Paul II	
Ghana	2005	4	Death of Pope John Paul II	
Costa Rica	2005	4	Death of Pope John Paul II	
Italy	2005	3	Death of Pope John Paul II	Flags were lowered to half-staff. All Italian league games postponed to next week, other sports events also postponed. Schools and offices closed on the day of the funeral.
San Marino	2005	3	Death of Pope John Paul II	On April 3, 4 and 5 and the day of the funeral ceremony, all public performances are suspended. In the afternoon of April 4, all activities in offices and construction sites were suspended from 4.30 pm.
Portugal	2005	3	Death of Pope John Paul II	Many entertainment places have been closed.
Slovakia	2005	3	Death of Pope John Paul II	
Croatia	2005	3	Death of Pope John Paul II	April 4, April 5 and April 8, the day of the Pope's funeral were days of national mourning. On mourning days, there are no cultural, entertainment and sports events.
Malta	2005	3	Death of Pope John Paul II	Government and public institutions as well as places of entertainment were closed for a period of 3 days of mourning.
Lebanon	2005	3	Death of Pope John Paul II	All TV and radio stations interrupted their normal programming for live coverage of events unfolding in the Vatican. National flags were lowered to half-mast on all government and public buildings and radio and television programming was changed to a more subdued schedule.
Palestine	2005	3	Death of Pope John Paul II	National flags were lowered to half-mast on government and public buildings.
Argentina	2005	3	Death of Pope John Paul II	
Chile	2005	3	Death of Pope John Paul II	
Cuba	2005	3	Death of Pope John Paul II	National mourning on April 3, 4 and 5. The government suspended all entertainment and public celebrations, including the final matches of the baseball championship, Cuba's most popular sport.
Peru	2005	3	Death of Pope John Paul II	Flags at half-mast. Monday, April 4, 2005, was declared a national holiday.
Bolivia	2005	3	Death of Pope John Paul II	
Ecuador	2005	3	Death of Pope John Paul II	
Haiti	2005	3	Death of Pope John Paul II	
Panama	2005	3	Death of Pope John Paul II	
Guatemala	2005	3	Death of Pope John Paul II	
East Timor	2005	3	Death of Pope John Paul II	
El Salvador	2005	3	Death of Pope John Paul II	
Dominican Republic	2005	3	Death of Pope John Paul II	
Egypt	2005	3	Death of Pope John Paul II	
Nigeria	2005	3	Death of Pope John Paul II	
Guinea-Bissau	2005	3	Death of Pope John Paul II	Entertainment and nightclubs were closed on April 4–6 and on the funeral on April 8.
Cape Verde	2005	3	Death of Pope John Paul II	The flags were lowered half-mast. On April 8, the day of the Pope's funeral was declared a day off.
São Tomé and Príncipe	2005	3	Death of Pope John Paul II	National flags were flown at half-mast at government and public facilities. Cultural and sporting events were suspended.
Equatorial Guinea	2005	3	Death of Pope John Paul II	Flags were flown at half-mast on government and public buildings. All official offices were closed for three days.
Belize	2005	3	Death of Pope John Paul II	National flags were lowered to half-mast on government and public buildings.
India	2005	3	Death of Pope John Paul II	Government institutions were closed during mourning and some schools.
Central African Republic	2005	3	Death of Pope John Paul II	
Colombia	2005	2	Death of Pope John Paul II	
Zambia	2005	2	Death of Pope John Paul II	
Kosovo	2005	2	Death of Pope John Paul II	
Romania	2005	1	Death of Pope John Paul II	
Czech Republic	2005	1	Death of Pope John Paul II	
Hungary	2005	1	Death of Pope John Paul II	
Slovenia	2005	1	Death of Pope John Paul II	The day of the Pope's funeral was a day of national mourning. Many cultural, sporting, and entertainment events were canceled and the Holy Father was honored with a three-minute silence at 10:00.
Albania	2005	1	Death of Pope John Paul II	
Ukraine	2005	1	Death of Pope John Paul II	
Uruguay	2005	1	Death of Pope John Paul II	
Mexico	2005	1	Death of Pope John Paul II	On April 8, the day of the Pope's funeral was declared a day of national mourning. All flags on government and public buildings were lowered to half-mast. All football games and other sports games have been postponed to the next week.
Spain	2005	1	Death of Pope John Paul II	
Ireland	2005	1	Death of Pope John Paul II	
Bosnia and Herzegovina	2005	1	Death of Pope John Paul II	
Sri Lanka	2005	1	Death of Pope John Paul II	April 5 is the day of national mourning. The flags were lowered half-mast.
Seychelles	2005	1	Death of Pope John Paul II	
Ivory Coast	2005	1	Death of Pope John Paul II	
Kenya	2005	1	Death of Pope John Paul II	
Democratic Republic of the Congo	2005	1	Death of Pope John Paul II	
Republic of the Congo	2005	1	Death of Pope John Paul II	The Congolese government also declared Friday a public holiday with flags flown at half-mast, schools closed and bars and discos shut.
Malawi	2005	1	Death of Pope John Paul II	
Mozambique	2005	1	Death of Pope John Paul II	
Angola	2005	1	Death of Pope John Paul II	
Bangladesh	2005	1	Death of Pope John Paul II	
Turkey	2005	At least 1	Death of Pope John Paul II	
Monaco	2005	9	Death of Prince Rainier III	Official national mourning from April 7 to April 15. Flags were lowered half-mast on all government and public buildings. Many public events were canceled and those that took place were preceded by a minute of silence. Casinos and schools were closed on the day of the Prince's funeral.
Philippines	2005	1	Death of Ang Kiu Kok	
Portugal	2005	1	Death of Álvaro Cunhal	
Philippines	2005	4	Death of Cardinal Jaime Sin	
Poland	2005	1	Victims of the 7 July 2005 London bombings	3 Polish citizens were among those killed.
Equatorial Guinea	2005	3	Victims of the 2005 Equatorial Express Airlines An-24 crash	
Costa Rica	2005	3	Victims of the Hospital Dr. Rafael Ángel Calderón Guardia disaster	
United Arab Emirates	2005	7	Death of King Fahd of Saudi Arabia	
Pakistan	2005	7	Death of King Fahd of Saudi Arabia	
Saudi Arabia	2005	3	Death of King Fahd of Saudi Arabia	Saudi state television interrupted regular broadcasting with recitations from the Qur'an. All offices were closed. Government offices remained closed for the rest of the week but flags weren't at half mast due to the country's law.
Algeria	2005	3	Death of King Fahd of Saudi Arabia	
Arab League	2005	3	Death of King Fahd of Saudi Arabia	
Egypt	2005	3	Death of King Fahd of Saudi Arabia	
Iraq	2005	3	Death of King Fahd of Saudi Arabia	
Jordan	2005	3	Death of King Fahd of Saudi Arabia	August 2 was a day off for all government and public departments.
Kuwait	2005	3	Death of King Fahd of Saudi Arabia	
Lebanon	2005	3	Death of King Fahd of Saudi Arabia	Flags on government and public buildings were lowered to half-mast. The government ordered three days of mourning Tuesday and the closure of public buildings.
Morocco	2005	3	Death of King Fahd of Saudi Arabia	
Oman	2005	3	Death of King Fahd of Saudi Arabia	
Palestine	2005	3	Death of King Fahd of Saudi Arabia	
Qatar	2005	3	Death of King Fahd of Saudi Arabia	
Senegal	2005	3	Death of King Fahd of Saudi Arabia	
Syria	2005	3	Death of King Fahd of Saudi Arabia	
Yemen	2005	3	Death of King Fahd of Saudi Arabia	
Mali	2005	2	Death of King Fahd of Saudi Arabia	
Seychelles	2005	2	Death of King Fahd of Saudi Arabia	
India	2005	1	Death of King Fahd of Saudi Arabia	
Bangladesh	2005	1	Death of King Fahd of Saudi Arabia	
Spain	2005	1	Death of King Fahd of Saudi Arabia	
Sudan	2005	3	Death of former Vice President of Sudan John Garang	Flags were lowered half-mast. On August 6, the funeral day was declared a day off.
Uganda	2005	1	Death of former Vice President of Sudan John Garang	Flags were lowered half-mast. On August 6, the funeral day was declared a day off from work.
Sri Lanka	2005	1	Assassination of Minister of Foreign Affairs Lakshman Kadirgamar	Monday, August 15 was declared a day of mourning, and schools, cinemas and shops were ordered closed.
Brazil	2005	3	Death of Miguel Arraes	
Cyprus	2005	3	Victims of the Helios Airways Flight 522	
Greece	2005	1	Victims of the Helios Airways Flight 522	
Eritrea	2005	3	Death of Minister of Foreign affairs Ali Said Abdella	
Iraq	2005	3	Victims of the 2005 Al-Aaimmah bridge stampede	
Pakistan	2005	3	Victims of the 2005 Kashmir earthquake	
Zambia	2005	1	Death of former Ugandan president Milton Obote	National mourning on October 24.
India	2005	7	Death of former President K. R. Narayanan	
United Arab Emirates	2006	40	Death of Prime Minister and Vice President Maktoum bin Rashid Al Maktoum	
Pakistan	2006	1	Death of Prime Minister and Vice President Maktoum bin Rashid Al Maktoum	
Kuwait	2006	40	Death of Emir Jaber Al-Ahmad Al-Sabah	The government announced a 40-day period of mourning and said offices would be closed for three days.
Bahrain	2006	40	Death of Emir Jaber Al-Ahmad Al-Sabah	Government institutions and offices closed for three days.
Jordan	2006	7	Death of Emir Jaber Al-Ahmad Al-Sabah	Jordanian radio and TV stations interrupted their regular program on news of the death of the Emir of Kuwait and began broadcasting verses of the Quran.
Yemen	2006	3	Death of Emir Jaber Al-Ahmad Al-Sabah	
Arab League	2006	3	Death of Emir Jaber Al-Ahmad Al-Sabah	
Egypt	2006	3	Death of Emir Jaber Al-Ahmad Al-Sabah	
Iraq	2006	3	Death of Emir Jaber Al-Ahmad Al-Sabah	
Algeria	2006	3	Death of Emir Jaber Al-Ahmad Al-Sabah	
Oman	2006	3	Death of Emir Jaber Al-Ahmad Al-Sabah	Official national mourning for three days and suspension of ministries and government institutions.
Syria	2006	3	Death of Emir Jaber Al-Ahmad Al-Sabah	
Pakistan	2006	3	Death of Emir Jaber Al-Ahmad Al-Sabah	
Mauritius	2006	3	Death of Emir Jaber Al-Ahmad Al-Sabah	
Palestine	2006	3	Death of Emir Jaber Al-Ahmad Al-Sabah	
India	2006	1	Death of Emir Jaber Al-Ahmad Al-Sabah	Official entertainment events canceled.
Montenegro	2006	3	Victims of the 2006 Montenegro train crash	
Slovakia	2006	1	Victims of the 2006 Slovak Air Force Antonov An-24 crash	23 January day of national mourning. Slovakia lowered flags to half-mast and sounded sirens on Monday to mourn the 42 victims killed in the crash. Slovak Television and Slovak Radio cancelled all entertainment programmes for the day.
Kosovo	2006	5	Death of President of Kosovo Ibrahim Rugova	Shops and schools were closed on the day funeral.
Poland	2006	4	Victims of the Katowice Trade Hall roof collapse	Entertainment and cultural events were canceled, and TV stations made changes to their programs.
Germany	2006	1	Death of former President of Germany Johannes Rau	
Estonia	2006	1	Death of former first President Lennart Meri	
Gabon	2006	7	Death of senate president Georges Rawiri	National mourning on April 10–16.
Guyana	2006	1	Assassination of Satyadeow Sawh	
Russia	2006	1	Victims of the crash of Armavia Flight 967	
Armenia	2006	1	Victims of the crash of Armavia Flight 967	
Benin	2006	1	Victims of the 2006 Porga explosion	
Russia	2006	1	Victims of the crash of S7 Airlines Flight 778	
India	2006	1	Death of Bismillah Khan	
Russia	2006	1	Victims of the crash of Pulkovo Aviation Enterprise Flight 612	
Ukraine	2006	1	Victims of the crash of Pulkovo Aviation Enterprise Flight 612	
Tonga	2006	30	Death of King Tāufaʻāhau Tupou IV	
Kazakhstan	2006	1	Victims of the 2006 Shakhtinsk mining disaster	
Nepal	2006	1	Victims of the 2006 Lelep helicopter crash	State Minister Gopal Rai and 23 others were killed.
Brazil	2006	3	Victims of the Gol Transportes Aéreos Flight 1907	
Poland	2006	3	Victims of the 2006 Halemba Coal Mine disaster	
Nigeria	2006	3	Victims of the ADC Airlines Flight 53	
Gambia	2006	1	Victims of the 2006 Kanifing East Estate fire	
Lebanon	2006	3	Assassination of Minister Pierre Amine Gemayel	
Djibouti	2006	3	Death of former President Hassan Gouled Aptidon	National mourning on November 22–24. The flags were lowered half-mast. Radio and television programs were interrupted to broadcast only verses from the Koran.
Marshall Islands	2006	7	Death of Ishmael John	
Hungary	2006	1	Death of Ferenc Puskas	
Bulgaria	2006	1	Victims of a bus accident near Byala	
Marshall Islands	2006	7	Death of Justin de Brum	
Turkmenistan	2006	7	Death of President Saparmurat Niyazov	Entertainment venues, theaters and cinemas are closed, and concerts and sports are canceled for the time of mourning.
Libya	2006–7	3	Execution of former Iraqi President Saddam Hussein	Public celebrations around the Eid holiday were canceled.
United States	2007	1	Death of former U.S. President Gerald Ford	Federal agencies and departments were closed.
Chad	2007	7	Death of Prime Minister Pascal Yoadimnadji	
El Salvador	2007	3	Death of Eduardo D'Abuisson and two other little-known politicians	
Latvia	2007	1	Victims of a fire disaster	
Russia	2007	1	Victims of the Ulyanovskaya Mine disaster, the crash of UTair Flight 471 and a fire at a retirement home	
Mozambique	2007	3	Victims of the 2007 Maputo arms depot explosion	
Armenia	2007	1	Death of Prime Minister Andranik Margaryan	
Solomon Islands	2007	1	Victims of the 2007 Solomon Islands earthquake	
Russia	2007	1	Death of former President Boris Yeltsin	April 25, the day of the funeral – the day of national mourning. The flags were lowered half-mast. TV stations canceled their entertainment shows.
Brazil	2007	3	Death of Octávio Frias	
Kenya	2007	1	Victims of the Kenya Airways Flight 507	
Cameroon	2007	1	Victims of the Kenya Airways Flight 507	
Samoa	2007	7	Death of head of state Malietoa Tanumafili II	
Malawi	2007	30	Death of First Lady Ethel Mutharika	
Togo	2007	3	Victims of the 2007 Paramount Airlines Mil Mi-8 crash	
Sierra Leone	2007	3	Victims of the 2007 Paramount Airlines Mil Mi-8 crash	
Somalia	2007	21	Death of first president Aden Adde	
Wallis and Futuna	2007	180	Death of king Tomasi Kulimoetoke II	
Lebanon	2007	1	Assassination of Walid Eido and 9 others	June 14 declared a day of national mourning. The state flags were lowered half-mast. On that day, companies, schools and offices were closed.
Iran	2007	3	Death of Grand Ayatollah Mohammad Fazel Lankarani	
Cuba	2007	1	Death of Vilma Espin	
Mongolia	2007	1	Victims of a helicopter crash	First time national mourning was declared in the country since 1984.
India	2007	7	Death of former Prime Minister Chandra Shekhar Singh	
Marshall Islands	2007	7	Death of Senator Fountain Inok	
Brazil	2007	3	Victims of the TAM Airlines Flight 3054	
Brazil	2007	3	Death of Antônio Carlos Magalhães, Júlio César Redecker and Nélio Dias	
Poland	2007	3	Victims of a bus accident in France	26 Polish pilgrims were killed.
Afghanistan	2007	3	Death of former King Mohammad Zahir Shah	National mourning from 24 to 26 July. The flags were lowered half-mast. Television channels immediately replaced scheduled programs with recitations of the Koran, religious chanting and panel discussions extolling the deceased monarch. All offices in the country have been closed.
Romania	2007	1	Death of Patriarch Teoctist	
Democratic Republic of the Congo	2007	3	Victims of the Benaleka train accident	
Peru	2007	3	Victims of 2007 Peru earthquake	
Uganda	2007	3	Victims of an accident near Mount Elgon	
Croatia	2007	1	Firefighters killed in the 2007 Croatian coast fires	
Greece	2007	3	Victims of the 2007 Greek forest fires	
Saint Lucia	2007	14	Death of Prime Minister John Compton	
Togo	2007	3	Victims of the 2007 African floods	
Lebanon	2007	1	Assassination of Antoine Ghanem	National mourning on September 21.
Republic of Srpska	2007	3	Death of President Milan Jelic	
Slovenia	2007	1	Victims of the 2007 Slovenia floods	National mourning on September 21.
Falkland Islands	2007	1	Death of Sir Jeremy Moore	
Myanmar	2007	3	Death of prime minister Soe Win	National mourning on October 12–14.
Ukraine	2007	1	Victims of a gas blast in Dnipropetrovsk	
Macedonia	2007	1	Death of Toše Proeski	October 17, the day of the funeral, a day of national mourning. Flags at half-mast.
Andorra	2007	3	Death of former Prime Minister Josep Pintat Solans	
Dominican Republic	2007	1	Death of Padre Luis Quinn	
Finland	2007	1	Victims of the Jokela school shooting	
Brazil	2007	3	Death of Ottomar Pinto	
Ukraine	2007	2	Victims of a tragedy at Zasyadko coal mine	
Pakistan	2007	3	Assassination of former Prime Minister of Pakistan Benazir Bhutto	All schools, colleges, universities, banks and government offices were closed.
Yemen	2007	3	Death of Abdullah Ibn Hussein Al-Ahmar	
Senegal	2007	3	Death of Serigne Saliou Mbacké	
Macedonia	2008	1	Victims of the 2008 Macedonian Armed Forces Mil Mi-17 crash	
Bosnia and Herzegovina	2008	1	Victims of the 2008 Macedonian Armed Forces Mil Mi-17 crash	
Indonesia	2008	7	Death of former President Suharto	
Greece	2008	4	Death of Christodoulos of Athens	National mourning on January 28–31. The flags were lowered half-mast. The schools were closed on the day of the funeral.
Kazakhstan	2008	3	Victims of the Abai mine disaster	
Poland	2008	3	Victims of the 2008 Polish Air Force C-295 Mirosławiec crash	
Slovenia	2008	1	Death of former president Janez Drnovšek	National mourning on February 25.
Bulgaria	2008	1	Victims of the Sofia – Kardam train fire	
Benin	2008	3	Death of poet Aimé Césaire	
Ukraine	2008	1	Victims of a crash of helicopter in South China Sea	
Kuwait	2008	3	Death of former Emir Saad Al-Salim Al-Sabah	
Bahrain	2008	3	Death of former Emir Saad Al-Salim Al-Sabah	
China	2008	3	Victims of the 2008 Sichuan earthquake	Flags at half-mast and all cultural and entertainment activities suspended. Authorities have also decided to momentarily halt the relay of the Olympic torch to honor the dead.
Hong Kong	2008	3	Victims of the 2008 Sichuan earthquake	
Macao	2008	3	Victims of the 2008 Sichuan earthquake	
Bangladesh^{[a]}	2008	1	Victims of the 2008 Sichuan earthquake	
Comoros	2008	1	Victims of the 2008 Sichuan earthquake	
Peru	2008	1	Victims of the 2008 Sichuan earthquake	
Myanmar	2008	3	Victims of Cyclone Nargis	
Bangladesh^{[a]}	2008	1	Victims of Cyclone Nargis	
Brazil	2008	3	Death of Jefferson Peres	
Liberia	2008	3	Victims of the 2008 Liberia heatwave	National mourning on June 6–8 with flags at half mast.
Kyrgyzstan	2008	1	Death of author Chinghiz Aitmatov	National mourning on June 12.
Brazil	2008	3	Death of Ruth Cardoso	
Guyana	2008	2	Death of former president Arthur Chung	
Slovenia	2008	1	Victims of the 2008 Blanca canoeing disaster	
Jamaica	2008	1	Death of Gladys Bustamante	
Palestine	2008	3	Death of Mahmoud Darwish	
Georgia	2008	3	Victims of the "humanitarian disaster" in South Ossetia and casualties during the Russo-Georgian War	
Abkhazia	2008	1	Victims of the "humanitarian disaster" in South Ossetia and casualties during the Russo-Georgian War	
Russia	2008	1	Victims of the "humanitarian disaster" in South Ossetia and casualties during the Russo-Georgian War	
Transnistria	2008	1	Victims of the "humanitarian disaster" in South Ossetia and casualties during the Russo-Georgian War	
Spain	2008	3	Victims of the Spanair Flight 5022	
Kyrgyzstan	2008	1	Victims of the Iran Aseman Airlines Flight 6895	
Zambia	2008	21	Death of President Levy Mwanawasa	Initially was 7 days of mourning. During the national mourning after the president's death, all sports matches and entertainment and cultural events were canceled. On September 3, the day of the president's funeral was declared a day off.
Seychelles	2008	1	Death of President Levy Mwanawasa	
Slovakia	2008	1	Victims of the 2008 Gospic bus crash in Croatia	All victims were Slovak nationals.
Laos	2008	5	Death of former President Nouhak Phoumsavanh	National mourning was declared from September 10 to 14. No ceremonies, balls, or entertainment were held during this period. Flags of all party offices and mass organizations at all levels, embassies, consulates, and Lao People's Democratic Republic missions abroad were flown at half-mast.
São Tomé and Príncipe	2008	1	Victims of the sinking of the Therese	National mourning on September 18.
Mauritania	2008	3	Decapitation of twelve soldiers	
Finland	2008	1	Victims of the Kauhajoki school shooting	
Kyrgyzstan	2008	1	Victims of the 2008 Kyrgyzstan earthquake	
Zambia	2008	1	Death of former Prime Minister Elijah Mudenda	
Santa Catarina (state of Brazil)	2008	3	Victims of 2008 Santa Catarina floods	
Maldives	2008	7	Death of former President Ibrahim Nasir	
Ecuador	2008	3	Death of former President Leon Febres Cordero	
Guinea	2008–9	40	Death of President of Guinea Lansana Conté	Throughout the period of mourning, the national flags were lowered to the middle of the mast. Friday, December 26, the day of the president's funeral was declared a day off.
Guinea-Bissau	2008	1	Death of President of Guinea Lansana Conté	
Ukraine	2008	1	Victims of the 2008 Yevpatoria gas explosion	
United Arab Emirates	2009	7	Death of Ruler of Umm Al Quwain Sheikh Rashid bin Ahmad Al Mualla	
Costa Rica	2009	5	Victims of the 2009 Cinchona earthquake	Flags flew at half mast. The Palmares Festival was postponed and other activities were cancelled
South Africa	2009	1	Death of congresswoman Helen Suzman	
India	2009	7	Death of former President Ramaswamy Venkataraman	
Kenya	2009	7	Victims of the 2009 Nakumatt supermarket fire and Molo fire	
Australia	2009	1	Victims of the Black Saturday bushfires	
Guinea-Bissau	2009	7	Assassination of President of Guinea-Bissau João Bernardo Vieira	Flags flew at half-mast on government and public buildings. Schools and offices were closed for several days. Many shops were closed for several days. All sporting, entertainment, and cultural events were suspended for the entire period of national mourning. Radio stations played classical and subdued music.
Germany	2009	1	Victims of the Winnenden school shooting	
Gabon	2009	10	Death of First Lady Edith Lucie Bongo	National mourning on March 13–22. Flags at half mast.
Slovakia	2009	1	Victims of a bus crash in Polomka	March 22 was declared a day of national mourning.
Argentina	2009	3	Death of former President Raúl Alfonsín	
Brazil	2009	3	Death of former President Raúl Alfonsín	
Paraguay	2009	3	Death of former President Raúl Alfonsín	
Peru	2009	1	Death of former President Raúl Alfonsín	
Italy	2009	1	Victims of the 2009 L'Aquila earthquake	
Poland	2009	3	Victims of the Kamień Pomorski homeless hostel fire	
Brazil	2009	3	Victims of the accident of Air France Flight 447	
Mexico	2009	3	Victims of the 2009 Hermosillo daycare center fire	
Guinea-Bissau	2009	3	Death of first president Luís Cabral	
Gabon	2009	30	Death of President Omar Bongo	After the announcement of the president's death, almost all shops, restaurants and bars were closed. Businesses and offices were shut and all nightclubs be closed until after the funeral. June 11 and June 16, the day of the president's funeral were declared bank holidays.
Economic Community of West African States	2009	30	Death of President Omar Bongo	
Republic of Congo	2009	8	Death of President Omar Bongo	
Central African Republic	2009	7	Death of President Omar Bongo	
Benin	2009	3	Death of President Omar Bongo	
Chad	2009	3	Death of President Omar Bongo	
Equatorial Guinea	2009	3	Death of President Omar Bongo	
São Tomé and Príncipe	2009	3	Death of President Omar Bongo	
Chad	2009	10	Death of former president Félix Malloum	National mourning on June 13–22.
Palau	2009	1	Death of Jasper Obakrairur	Only time national mourning was observed in Palau
Micronesia	2009	4	Death of foreign minister Resio S. Moses	
Comoros	2009	30	Victims of the Yemenia Flight 626	
South Korea	2009	7	Death of former President of South Korea Roh Moo-hyun	
Armenia	2009	1	Victims of Caspian Airlines Flight 7908	
Mauritius	2009	3	Death of Jean Margéot	
Brazil	2009	3	Death of Carlos Alberto Menezes Direito	
Bulgaria	2009	1	Victims of the 2009 Yambol bus crash	
Serbia	2009	1	Nine Serbian citizens killed in a traffic accident in Egypt	Government declared 17 July the national day of mourning.
Croatia	2009	1	Victims of the Rudine train derailment	27 July declared national day of mourning.
Philippines	2009	10	Death of former President Corazon Aquino	
Jamaica	2009	1	Death of former prime minister Gladys Bustamante	National mourning on August 8.
Slovakia	2009	1	Victims of the 2009 Handlová mine blast	National mourning on August 12.
South Korea	2009	7	Death of former President of South Korea Kim Dae-jung	
Serbia	2009	1	Seven workers killed in an accident in the ammunition factory "Prvi partizan"	Government declared 5 September the national day of mourning.
Macedonia	2009	1	Victims of 2009 Lake Ohrid boat accident	
Bulgaria	2009	1	Victims of 2009 Lake Ohrid boat accident	
Philippines	2009	1	Death of Ka Eraño G. Manalo	
Cuba	2009	1	Death of Vice President of Cuba Juan Almeida Bosque	
Sierra Leone	2009	1	Victims of the 2009 Sierra Leone ferry disaster	
Burundi	2009	5	Victims of the 2009 African Union base bombings in Mogadishu	
Samoa	2009	1	Victims of 2009 Samoa tsunami	
Guinea	2009	2	Victims of the 2009 Conakry Massacre	
Argentina	2009	1	Death of Mercedes Sosa	
Andorra	2009	3	Death of Joan Martí i Alanis	
Poland	2009	2	Victims of the 2009 Wujek-Śląsk mine blast	
Andorra	2009	1	Victims of the 2009 Massana bridge collapse	At least 5 deaths.
Serbia	2009	3	Death of Patriarch Pavle	
Philippines	2009	1	Victims of the Maguindanao massacre	
Russia	2009	1	Victims of the Lame Horse nightclub fire	
Costa Rica	2009	3	Death of former President Rodrigo Carazo	
Indonesia	2009–10	7	Death of former President Abdurrahman Wahid	

== 2010–2014 ==
Country	Year	Days	Reason	Notes
Costa Rica	2010	1	Death of politician Alberto Martén Chavarría	
Suriname	2010	4	Death of former president Johan Ferrier	
Togo	2010	3	Victims of the 2010 Cabida attacks	
Benin	2010	3	Victims of the 2010 Haiti earthquake	
Brazil	2010	3	Victims of the 2010 Haiti earthquake	
Dominican Republic	2010	2	Victims of the 2010 Haiti earthquake	
Haiti	2010	1	Victims of the 2010 Haiti earthquake	
Grenada	2010	1	Victims of the 2010 Haiti earthquake	
Peru	2010	1	Victims of the 2010 Haiti earthquake	
Lebanon	2010	1	Victims of Ethiopian Airlines Flight 409	
Micronesia	2010	4	Death of Andon Amaraich	
Australia	2010	1	Remembrance of the Black Saturday bushfires	This was the second day of national mourning for this event.
Costa Rica	2010	3	Death of former President José Joaquín Trejos Fernández	
Portugal	2010	3	Victims of the 2010 Madeira floods and mudslides	
Central African Republic	2010	7	Death of former president André Kolingba	
Chile	2010	3	Victims of 2010 Chile earthquake	
Peru	2010	1	Victims of 2010 Chile earthquake	
São Tomé and Príncipe	2010	5	Death of poet Alda Neves do Espírito Santo	
Cape Verde	2010	1	Death of poet Alda Neves do Espírito Santo	
Kazakhstan	2010	1	Victims of Kyzyl-Agash Dam failure	
Nepal	2010	3	Death of former Prime Minister of Nepal Girija Prasad Koirala	
UAE	2010	3	Death of Sheikh Ahmed bin Zayed Al Nahyan	Cultural and entertainment events canceled during the days of national mourning.
Kyrgyzstan	2010	2	Victims of the Kyrgyz Revolution of 2010	
Poland	2010	9	Victims of the Smolensk air disaster in Russia	Polish President Lech Kaczyński and other senior officials were killed. Almost all stations stopped the regular broadcast of their program to cover the events related to the Smolensk catastrophe and radio stations for a week of mourning played calm and subdued music. Theaters, cinemas, entertainment venues and clubs have closed, concerts and matches and other sports competitions were cancelled. Shopping centers were closed on the day of the funeral of the presidential couple.
Lithuania	2010	4	Victims of the Smolensk air disaster in Russia	The 4th Day of National Mourning is declared on day of funeral of President of Poland Lech Kaczyński
Brazil	2010	3	Victims of the Smolensk air disaster in Russia	
Costa Rica	2010	2	Victims of the Smolensk air disaster in Russia	
Czech Republic	2010	2	Victims of the Smolensk air disaster in Russia	April 17–18 is a day of national mourning. On the day of the funeral of the Polish president, a minute of silence was observed, and flags on government and public buildings were lowered to half-mast.
Maldives	2010	2	Victims of the Smolensk air disaster in Russia	
Romania	2010	1	Victims of the Smolensk air disaster in Russia	April 18, the day of the Polish president's funeral, was declared a day of national mourning. The national flag was flown at half-mast in government, central, and local administrative institutions, as well as at the headquarters of political parties, educational institutions, and diplomatic missions in Romania. Romanian Public Television and Radio adapted their programming to reflect the solemnity taking place in Poland. The National Audiovisual Council recommended that private radio and television stations pay special attention to the production and broadcasting of programs dedicated to the funerals of former Polish president Lech Kaczyński and other victims of the Smolensk tragedy. Matches and other public events were preceded by a minute of silence.
Hungary	2010	1	Victims of the Smolensk air disaster in Russia	April 18, the day of the funeral of the President of Poland, a day of national mourning. National flags flown at half-mast on government and public buildings.
Slovakia	2010	1	Victims of the Smolensk air disaster in Russia	
Croatia	2010	1	Victims of the Smolensk air disaster in Russia	
Canada	2010	1	Victims of the Smolensk air disaster in Russia	
Spain	2010	1	Victims of the Smolensk air disaster in Russia	
European Union	2010	1	Victims of the Smolensk air disaster in Russia	The European Union had a day of mourning on 12 April, and a minute of silence was observed at NATO headquarters in Brussels
Georgia	2010	1	Victims of the Smolensk air disaster in Russia	
Bulgaria	2010	1	Victims of the Smolensk air disaster in Russia	April 18, the funeral of the Polish president, was a day of national mourning. All Bulgarian flags on government and city buildings were lowered to half-mast as a sign of respect for the victims of the disaster and the Polish nation.
Ukraine	2010	1	Victims of the Smolensk air disaster in Russia	
Latvia	2010	1	Victims of the Smolensk air disaster in Russia	
Russia	2010	1	Victims of the Smolensk air disaster in Russia	April 12 was declared a day of national mourning in the Russian Federation. Russian state flags were lowered across the country on the day of mourning. Television and radio stations changed their programming, and cultural institutions were asked to commemorate and limit entertainment on the day of mourning.
Serbia	2010	1	Victims of the Smolensk air disaster in Russia	
Montenegro	2010	1	Victims of the Smolensk air disaster in Russia	
Moldova	2010	1	Victims of the Smolensk air disaster in Russia	
North Macedonia	2010	1	Victims of the Smolensk air disaster in Russia	
Estonia	2010	1	Victims of the Smolensk air disaster in Russia	
Turkey	2010	1	Victims of the Smolensk air disaster in Russia	
Cape Verde	2010	1	Victims of the Smolensk air disaster in Russia	
Zambia	2010	1	Death of Haswel Mwale	
South Korea	2010	5	Victims of ROKS Cheonan sinking	
China	2010	1	Victims of the 2010 Yushu earthquake	
Nigeria	2010	7	Death of President Umaru Musa Yar'Adua	All cultural and entertainment events were canceled and the flags were lowered to the middle of the mast. May 6 was also announced a day off from work. In the Nigerian state of Katsina, where the deceased president was governor in 1999–2007, a 7-day bank holiday period was announced from May 6 to May 12, 2010.
Ghana	2010	3	Death of President Umaru Musa Yar'Adua	
Brazil	2010	1	Death of President Umaru Musa Yar'Adua	
Bangladesh	2010	1	Victims of 2010 Dhaka fire	
Portugal	2010	2	Death of José Saramago	
Kyrgyzstan	2010	3	Victims of the 2010 South Kyrgyzstan ethnic clashes	
Republic of Congo	2010	3	Victims of the 2010 Yanga train derailment	
Lithuania	2010	3	Death of former president and Prime Minister Algirdas Brazauskas	
Lebanon	2010	1	Death of Shiite cleric Sayyed Mohammad Hussein Fadlallah	
Uganda	2010	7	Victims of 2010 Kampala bombings	
Pakistan	2010	1	Victims of Airblue Flight 202	
Uganda	2010	5	Death of former president Godfrey Binaisa	
Malta	2010	3	Death of former President Guido de Marco	
China	2010	1	Victims of the 2010 Gansu mudslide	Flags were flown at half staff, all public forms of entertainment were suspended, and the country's main websites removed all color from their front pages.
Hong Kong	2010	3	Victims of Manila hostage crisis	
Philippines	2010	1	Victims of Manila hostage crisis	
Slovakia	2010	1	Victims of 2010 Bratislava shooting	Flags fly at half-mast.
Guatemala	2010	1	Victims of the 2010 Guatemala landslides	
Ukraine	2010	1	Victims of Marhanets train accident	
Barbados	2010	10	Death of prime minister David Thompson	Mourning Period started on October 23 and ended on the day of the state funeral, flags were put at half mast
Argentina	2010	3	Death of former President of Argentina Néstor Kirchner	National mourning on October 27–29. All flags on government and public buildings were lowered to half mast. All Argentinian football league games were postponed until the following week.
Union of South American Nations	2010	3	Death of former President of Argentina Néstor Kirchner	
Brazil	2010	3	Death of former President of Argentina Néstor Kirchner	
Venezuela	2010	3	Death of former President of Argentina Néstor Kirchner	
Chile	2010	3	Death of former President of Argentina Néstor Kirchner	
Colombia	2010	3	Death of former President of Argentina Néstor Kirchner	
Uruguay	2010	3	Death of former President of Argentina Néstor Kirchner	
Paraguay	2010	3	Death of former President of Argentina Néstor Kirchner	
Ecuador	2010	3	Death of former President of Argentina Néstor Kirchner	
Peru	2010	1	Death of former President of Argentina Néstor Kirchner	
Brazil	2010	3	Death of Romeu Tuma	
Cambodia	2010	1	Victims of the Phnom Penh stampede	
New Zealand	2010	1	Victims of Pike River Mine disaster	
Marshall Islands	2010	7	Death of Atama Zedkaia	
Dominican Republic	2010	3	Death of former President Salvador Jorge Blanco	
Brazil	2011	3	Victims of the January 2011 Rio de Janeiro floods and mudslides	
Tunisia	2011	3	Victims killed in the Tunisian Revolution	
Lithuania	2011	1	Death of Justinas Marcinkevičius	
Estonia	2011	1	Victims of the 2011 Haapsalu fire	
Chile	2011	2	Death of judge Mario Garrido Montt	
Nepal	2011	3	Death of former Prime Minister of Nepal Krishna Prasad Bhattarai	
Tonga	2011	7	Victims of the 2011 Tōhoku earthquake and tsunami	
Maldives	2011	3	Victims of the 2011 Tōhoku earthquake and tsunami	
Peru	2011	1	Victims of the 2011 Tōhoku earthquake and tsunami	
Turkey	2011	1	Victims of the 2011 Tōhoku earthquake and tsunami	
Palau	2011	1	Victims of the 2011 Tōhoku earthquake and tsunami	
Monaco	2011	14	Death of Princess Antoinette, Baroness of Massy	
Brazil	2011	7	Death of former President José Alencar	
Brazil	2011	3	Victims of the Rio de Janeiro school shooting	
Belarus	2011	1	Victims of the 2011 Minsk Metro bombing	
Bolivia	2011	30	Death of former President Lidia Gueiler	
Central African Republic	2011	7	Death of former president Ange-Félix Patassé	
Ivory Coast	2011	3	Victims of post-election violence	
Abkhazia	2011	3	Death of President of Abkhazia Sergei Bagapsh	National mourning from May 31 to June 2. The entertainment programs will be postponed.
Transnistria	2011	1	Death of President of Abkhazia Sergei Bagapsh	National mourning on June 2. Flags lowered to half mast. Entertainment programs were cancelled.
Bulgaria	2011	1	Victims of a bus accident on the Trakia motorway	
Andorra	2011	1	Victims of the 2011 Andorra helicopter crash	
Zambia	2011	7	Death of former President Frederick Chiluba	National mourning from June 20 to June 27. The flags were lowered half-mast. Radio and TV stations gave up entertainment programs during the national mourning. It has also been instructed that all entertainment activities be suspended or canceled.
Brazil	2011	7	Death of former President Itamar Franco	
Russia	2011	1	Victims of the sinking of the Bulgaria cruise ship	
Cyprus	2011	3	Victims of the 2011 Zygi explosion	
Morocco	2011	3	Victims of the 2011 Royal Moroccan Air Force C-130 crash	
Ivory Coast	2011	3	Victims of the 2011 Abidjan bus accident	
Comoros	2011	3	Capsizing of a boat	
Ukraine	2011	1	Victims of tragedies at Sukhodilska–Skhidna coal mine and Bazhanov coal mine	
Norway	2011	1	Victims of the 2011 Norway attacks	August 21 was a day of national mourning.
Mexico	2011	3	Victims of the 2011 Monterrey casino attack	
Chile	2011	2	Victims of the 2011 Chilean Air Force C2-12 crash	
Kenya	2011	2	Victims of the 2011 Nairobi pipeline fire	
Belize	2011	7	Death of first prime minister George Cadle Price	
Cape Verde	2011	5	Death of first president Aristides Pereira	
Somalia	2011	3	Victims of the 2011 Mogadishu bombing	
Bahrain	2011	3	Death of Saudi Crown Prince Sultan bin Abdulaziz Al Saud	
Kuwait	2011	3	Death of Saudi Crown Prince Sultan bin Abdulaziz Al Saud	
United Arab Emirates	2011	3	Death of Saudi Crown Prince Sultan bin Abdulaziz Al Saud	
Djibouti	2011	3	Death of Saudi Crown Prince Sultan bin Abdulaziz Al Saud	National flags at half-mast. All official cultural and artistic activities and festivals suspended, recitation of the Holy Quran limited to Republic Television and Radio.
Jordan	2011	1	Death of Saudi Crown Prince Sultan bin Abdulaziz Al Saud	
Lebanon	2011	1	Death of Saudi Crown Prince Sultan bin Abdulaziz Al Saud	
Palestine	2011	1	Death of Saudi Crown Prince Sultan bin Abdulaziz Al Saud	
Pakistan	2011	10	Death of former First Lady Begum Nusrat Bhutto	The government declared a public holiday and flags flew at half-mast as offices, shops and schools closed.
Niger	2011	3	Death of former president Ali Saibou	
Dominica	2011	1	Death of singer Jeff Joseph	
Cape Verde	2011	2	Death of Cesária Évora	
North Korea	2011	13	Death of Supreme Leader Kim Jong-il	Official mourning period. All entertainment and music activities suspended, theaters closed for the period of mourning.
North Korea	2011–14	1,097	Death of Supreme Leader Kim Jong-il	Total mourning period
Cuba	2011	3	Death of Supreme Leader Kim Jong-il	
Czech Republic	2011	3	Death of Václav Havel, former president of the Czech Republic and Czechoslovakia	Concerts, exhibitions and theatrical performances were mostly canceled while casinos and gambling bars were closed. Businesses and citizens were asked to reconsider celebratory events.
Slovakia	2011	1	Death of Václav Havel, former president of the Czech Republic and Czechoslovakia	
Macedonia	2012	1	Death of former President Kiro Gligorov	
Guinea-Bissau	2012	7	Death of President Malam Bacai Sanhá	
Cape Verde	2012	1	Death of President Malam Bacai Sanhá	
Northern Cyprus	2012	7	Death of former President Rauf Denktaş	
Turkey	2012	4	Death of former President Rauf Denktaş	
Egypt	2012	3	Victims of the Port Said Stadium riot	
Bulgaria	2012	1	Victims of flooding in Biser	
Central African Republic	2012	1	Death of businessman Joseph Icham Kamach	
Kosovo	2012	1	Victims of a natural disaster in Restelicë	
Argentina	2012	2	Victims of 2012 Buenos Aires rail disaster	
Poland	2012	2	Victims of the Szczekociny rail crash	
Belgium	2012	1	Victims of the Sierre coach crash in Switzerland	Most of the victims were from Belgium.
Egypt	2012	3	Death of Coptic Patriarch Pope Shenouda III	
Tonga	2012	At least 90	Death of King George Tupou V	
Malawi	2012	10	Death of President Bingu wa Mutharika	
Algeria	2012	8	Death of first president Ahmed Ben Bella	
Nicaragua	2012	3	Death of Tomás Borge	
Kazakhstan	2012	1	Victims of Arkankengen massacre	
Albania	2012	1	Victims of Qafa e Vishës bus accident	
Italy	2012	1	Victims of the 2012 Northern Italy earthquakes	Day of mourning on June 4.
Nigeria	2012	3	Victims of the crash of Dana Air Flight 992	
Kenya	2012	3	Victims of the 2012 Kenya Police helicopter crash	
Zambia	2012	1	Death of Mundia Sikatana	
Russia	2012	1	Victims of the 2012 Krasnodar Krai floods and a Russian bus accident in Ukraine	
Brazil	2012	3	Death of Dom Eugênio Sales	
Tanzania	2012	3	Victims of the 2012 Zanzibar boat accident	
Egypt	2012	3	Victims of the August 2012 Sinai attack	
Ghana	2012	7	Death of President John Atta Mills	
Croatia	2012	1	Death of Parliament Speaker Boris Šprem	
Iran	2012	2	Victims of 2012 East Azerbaijan earthquakes	It was also decreed in East Azerbaijan
South Africa	2012	7	Victims of Marikana massacre	
Philippines	2012	6	Death of Jesse Robredo in a plane crash	
Ethiopia	2012	13	Death of Prime Minister Meles Zenawi	
South Sudan	2012	3	Death of Prime Minister Meles Zenawi	
Malta	2012	2	Death of former Prime Minister Dom Mintoff	
Venezuela	2012	3	Victims of the Amuay tragedy	
Sri Lanka	2012	1	Death of Weweldeniye Medhalankara Thero	
Bahamas	2012	9	Death of first Attorney General Paul Adderley	
Zambia	2012	3	Death of former First Lady Betty Kaunda	
Hong Kong	2012	3	Victims of the Lamma Island ferry collision	Declared that starts on 4 October.
Algeria	2012	8	Death of former Algerian President Chadli Benjedid	
Cambodia	2012	7	Death of former King Norodom Sihanouk	
Bulgaria	2012	1	Death of Patriarch Maxim	
Guatemala	2012	3	Victims of the 2012 Guatemala earthquake	
Ghana	2012	5	Death of former vice president Aliu Mahama	
India	2012	7	Death of former Prime Minister Inder Kumar Gujral	
Brazil	2012	7	Death of Oscar Niemeyer	
Mauritania	2012	3	Death of former president Mustafa Ould Salek	
Pakistan	2012	1	Death of Bashir Ahmed Bilour	
Kazakhstan	2012	1	Victims of the 2012 Kazakhstan Antonov An-72 crash	
Ivory Coast	2013	3	Victims of the 2013 Houphouët-Boigny stampede	
Brazil	2013	3	Victims of the Kiss nightclub fire	
Mexico	2013	3	Victims of the Torre Ejecutiva Pemex explosion	
Kazakhstan	2013	1	Victims of the SCAT Airlines Flight 760	
Cambodia	2013	7	Cremation of former King Norodom Sihanouk	
Guinea	2013	3	Victims of the 2013 Guinea Air Force plane crash	
Liberia	2013	1	Victims of the 2013 Guinea Air Force plane crash	
Chad	2013	1	26 soldiers killed in Mali War	
Venezuela	2013	7	Death of Venezuelan President Hugo Chávez	National flags on government and public buildings were lowered to half-mast. Entertainment venues, nightclubs were closed and concerts and sports were canceled. TV programs suspended the normal program to broadcast coverage of the death of the president and radio stations played calm music. All schools and universities closed until next Monday. Offices and many businesses were closed on the day of the funeral.
Bolivia	2013	7	Death of Venezuelan President Hugo Chávez	
Nicaragua	2013	7	Death of Venezuelan President Hugo Chávez	
Argentina	2013	3	Death of Venezuelan President Hugo Chávez	
Belarus	2013	3	Death of Venezuelan President Hugo Chávez	National mourning on 6 to 8 March. The flags were lowered half-mast. Television and radio stations canceled entertainment shows and commercials as a sign of respect.
Haiti	2013	3	Death of Venezuelan President Hugo Chávez	National flags lowered on all government and public buildings. Radio and television stations changed their schedules to more subdued programs commemorating the late President Chavez. Nightclubs closed and dance music banned from the radio.
Peru	2013	3	Death of Venezuelan President Hugo Chávez	
Chile	2013	3	Death of Venezuelan President Hugo Chávez	
Brazil	2013	3	Death of Venezuelan President Hugo Chávez	
Ecuador	2013	3	Death of Venezuelan President Hugo Chávez	
Uruguay	2013	3	Death of Venezuelan President Hugo Chávez	
Dominican Republic	2013	3	Death of Venezuelan President Hugo Chávez	
Cuba	2013	3	Death of Venezuelan President Hugo Chávez	National mourning from 6:00 am on March 6 to 12:00 on March 7 at night and on March 8. All public shows and entertainment on hold during mourning.
Antigua and Barbuda	2013	3	Death of Venezuelan President Hugo Chávez	
Iran	2013	1	Death of Venezuelan President Hugo Chávez	
Dominica	2013	1	Death of Venezuelan President Hugo Chávez	
Saint Vincent and the Grenadines	2013	1	Death of Venezuelan President Hugo Chávez	
Guyana	2013	1	Death of Venezuelan President Hugo Chávez	
Suriname	2013	1	Death of Venezuelan President Hugo Chávez	March 8, the day of Chavez's funeral, is a day of national mourning. Flags were lowered to half-mast on government and public buildings. Radio and television stations have been asked to adjust their programming.
Nigeria	2013	1	Death of Venezuelan President Hugo Chávez	
Sahrawi Arab Democratic Republic	2013	1	Death of Venezuelan President Hugo Chávez	
Bulgaria	2013	1	Death of protest leader Plamen Goranov	
Bangladesh	2013	3	Death of President Zillur Rahman	
Mauritius	2013	1	Victims of the 2013 Mauritius floods	
Algeria	2013	8	Death of Former acting President Ali Kafi	
Sahrawi Arab Democratic Republic	2013	7	Death of Khalil Sid Mhamed	
Guinea-Bissau	2013	3	Death of former interim president Henrique Rosa	
Central African Republic	2013	3	Victims of 2013 Central African Republic mine collapse	
Romania	2013	1	Victims of the 2013 Podgorica bus crash in Montenegro	All of the victims were Romanian citizens.
Montenegro	2013	1	Victims of the 2013 Podgorica bus crash in Montenegro	
Honduras	2013	1	Murder of Anibal Barrow	
Cape Verde	2013	2	Death of Bana (singer)	
Spain	2013	3	Victims of the Santiago de Compostela derailment	
Tunisia	2013	1	Assassination of Mohamed Brahmi	National mourning on July 26.
Bulgaria	2013	1	Victims of the Oranovo mine collapse	
Lebanon	2013	1	Victims of the 2013 Tripoli attacks	
Guatemala	2013	3	Victims of 2013 Guatemala bus crash	
Kenya	2013	3	Victims of the 2013 Nairobi attack	
Italy	2013	1	Victims of the 2013 Lampedusa migrant shipwreck	
Chad	2013	1	Victims of the 2013 Lampedusa migrant shipwreck	
Mauritania	2013	1	Victims of the 2013 Lampedusa migrant shipwreck	
African Union	2013	1	Victims of the 2013 Lampedusa migrant shipwreck	
Vietnam	2013	2	Death of Vietnamese General Võ Nguyên Giáp	The national flag was flown at half-staff, and unrelated public events were cancelled. The country's cable television provider blocked access to international sports and entertainment channels from Friday until Sunday.
Tunisia	2013	3	6 police officers killed in a firefight with suspected jihadists	No official ceremony, government representatives barred from funerals.
Niger	2013	3	92 migrants dead in desert	
Poland	2013	1	Death of former Prime Minister Tadeusz Mazowiecki	
Latvia	2013	3	Victims of Zolitūde shopping centre roof collapse	
Lithuania	2013	1	Victims of Zolitūde shopping centre roof collapse	
Estonia	2013	1	Victims of Zolitūde shopping centre roof collapse	
Italy	2013	1	Victims of the 2013 Sardinia floods	
San Marino	2013	1	Victims of the 2013 Sardinia floods	
Brazil	2013	3	Death of governor of Sergipe Marcelo Déda Chagas	
South Africa	2013	10	Death of former President of South Africa Nelson Mandela	The South African government declared Sunday 8 December 2013 to be observed as a national day of prayer and reflection. On the day of the funeral, December 15, all banks, offices, businesses and many shops were closed
Algeria	2013	8	Death of former President of South Africa Nelson Mandela	
Antigua and Barbuda	2013	7	Death of former President of South Africa Nelson Mandela	
Barbados	2013	7	Death of former President of South Africa Nelson Mandela	Flags were flown from at least December 9 until funeral.
Ghana	2013	7	Death of former President of South Africa Nelson Mandela	
Benin	2013	7	Death of former President of South Africa Nelson Mandela	
Gabon	2013	7	Death of former President of South Africa Nelson Mandela	Flags at half mast until December 15 2013.
Brazil	2013	7	Death of former President of South Africa Nelson Mandela	
Zambia	2013	7	Death of former President of South Africa Nelson Mandela	
Mozambique	2013	6	Death of former President of South Africa Nelson Mandela	
Rwanda	2013	6	Death of former President of South Africa Nelson Mandela	
India	2013	5	Death of former President of South Africa Nelson Mandela	
Jamaica	2013	5	Death of former President of South Africa Nelson Mandela	
African Union	2013	3	Death of former President of South Africa Nelson Mandela	
Ethiopia	2013	3	Death of former President of South Africa Nelson Mandela	
Kenya	2013	3	Death of former President of South Africa Nelson Mandela	
Tanzania	2013	3	Death of former President of South Africa Nelson Mandela	
Burundi	2013	3	Death of former President of South Africa Nelson Mandela	
Democratic Republic of the Congo	2013	3	Death of former President of South Africa Nelson Mandela	
Malawi	2013	3	Death of former President of South Africa Nelson Mandela	
South Sudan	2013	3	Death of former President of South Africa Nelson Mandela	
Central African Republic	2013	3	Death of former President of South Africa Nelson Mandela	
Niger	2013	3	Death of former President of South Africa Nelson Mandela	
Nigeria	2013	3	Death of former President of South Africa Nelson Mandela	
Guinea	2013	3	Death of former President of South Africa Nelson Mandela	
Sierra Leone	2013	3	Death of former President of South Africa Nelson Mandela	
Liberia	2013	3	Death of former President of South Africa Nelson Mandela	
Mali	2013	3	Death of former President of South Africa Nelson Mandela	
Senegal	2013	3	Death of former President of South Africa Nelson Mandela	
Namibia	2013	3	Death of former President of South Africa Nelson Mandela	
São Tomé and Príncipe	2013	3	Death of former President of South Africa Nelson Mandela	
Cape Verde	2013	3	Death of former President of South Africa Nelson Mandela	
Portugal	2013	3	Death of former President of South Africa Nelson Mandela	
Cuba	2013	3	Death of former President of South Africa Nelson Mandela	National flags lowered to half-mast on government, military and public buildings. All public ceremonies suspended or postponed.
El Salvador	2013	3	Death of former President of South Africa Nelson Mandela	
Costa Rica	2013	3	Death of former President of South Africa Nelson Mandela	
Egypt	2013	3	Death of former President of South Africa Nelson Mandela	
Venezuela	2013	3	Death of former President of South Africa Nelson Mandela	
Nicaragua	2013	3	Death of former President of South Africa Nelson Mandela	
Seychelles	2013	3	Death of former President of South Africa Nelson Mandela	
Bangladesh	2013	3	Death of former President of South Africa Nelson Mandela	
Nepal	2013	3	Death of former President of South Africa Nelson Mandela	
Maldives	2013	3	Death of former President of South Africa Nelson Mandela	
East Timor	2013	3	Death of former President of South Africa Nelson Mandela	
Sahrawi Arab Democratic Republic	2013	3	Death of former President of South Africa Nelson Mandela	
Mauritania	2013	3	Death of former President of South Africa Nelson Mandela	
Belize	2013	2	Death of former President of South Africa Nelson Mandela	Flags were half-mast on December 6 and 15.
Chad	2013	2	Death of former President of South Africa Nelson Mandela	
Sri Lanka	2013	2	Death of former President of South Africa Nelson Mandela	{
Trinidad and Tobago	2013	2	Death of former President of South Africa Nelson Mandela	
Uruguay	2013	2	Death of former President of South Africa Nelson Mandela	
Bahamas	2013	At least 1	Death of former President of South Africa Nelson Mandela	
Dominican Republic	2013	1	Death of former President of South Africa Nelson Mandela	
Dominica	2013	1	Death of former President of South Africa Nelson Mandela	
Haiti	2013	1	Death of former President of South Africa Nelson Mandela	
Tunisia	2013	1	Death of former President of South Africa Nelson Mandela	
Lebanon	2013	1	Death of former President of South Africa Nelson Mandela	Flags on government, state and city buildings were lowered to half-mast, television stations made changes to their schedules and entertainment programs that were originally planned to be broadcast on that date were canceled.
Palestine	2013	1	Death of former President of South Africa Nelson Mandela	
Mauritius	2013	1	Death of former President of South Africa Nelson Mandela	
Guyana	2013	1	Death of former President of South Africa Nelson Mandela	
Mozambique	2013	3	Victims of LAM Mozambique Airlines Flight 470	
Libya	2013	3	Victims of the 2013 Barsis suicide bombings	
Egypt	2013	3	Victims of the December 2013 Cairo bombing	
Portugal	2014	3	Death of Eusébio	
Somalia	2014	3	Death of former prime minister Abdirizak Haji Hussein	
Puerto Rico	2014	3	Death of Luis Raúl	
Burundi	2014	2	Victims of the 2014 Burundi floods	
Algeria	2014	3	Victims of the 2014 Algerian Air Force C-130 crash	
Ukraine	2014	3	Victims of the Revolution of Dignity	20,22 and 23 February was national days of mourning.
Lithuania	2014	1	Victims of the Revolution of Dignity	
Mozambique	2014	1	Death of Mário Esteves Coluna	
Afghanistan	2014	3	Death of Vice President Marshal Fahim	
Portugal	2014	1	Death of José Policarpo	
Sierra Leone	2014	7	Death of former president Ahmad Tejan Kabbah	
Spain	2014	3	Death of former Prime Minister of Spain Adolfo Suárez	
Colombia	2014	3	Death of Gabriel García Márquez	
Trinidad and Tobago	2014	5	Death of former president A. N. R. Robinson	
Afghanistan	2014	1	Victims of the 2014 Badakhshan mudslides	
Ukraine	2014	2	Victims of 2014 Odesa clashes and for the military dead in east of Ukraine	
Togo	2014	3	Death of Robert-Casimir Dosseh-Anyron	
Turkey	2014	3	Victims of 2014 Soma mine disaster	
Northern Cyprus	2014	2	Victims of 2014 Soma mine disaster	
Pakistan	2014	1	Victims of 2014 Soma mine disaster	
Azerbaijan	2014	1	Victims of 2014 Soma mine disaster	
Serbia	2014	3	Victims of 2014 Southeast Europe floods	
Bosnia and Herzegovina	2014	1	Victims of 2014 Southeast Europe floods	
Mali	2014	3	Victims of the Second Battle of Kidal	
Ukraine	2014	1	Victims of the 2014 Ukrainian Air Force Il-76 shootdown	
Bulgaria	2014	1	Victims of the 2014 Bulgarian floods	
Georgia	2014	1	Death of former president Eduard Shevardnadze	
Central African Republic	2014	3	Victims of the 2014 Bambari cathedral attack	
Tunisia	2014	3	Victims of the 2014 Chaambi Mountains attack	
Netherlands	2014	1	Victims of the shootdown of Malaysia Airlines Flight 17 in Ukraine	193 Dutch citizens were among those killed. First national day of mourning in the Netherlands since the assassination of John F. Kennedy in 1963.
Malaysia	2014	1	Victims of the shootdown of Malaysia Airlines Flight 17 in Ukraine	43 Malaysian citizens were among those killed. This was the first and final time national mourning was observed in Malaysia since 2001.
Australia	2014	1	Victims of the shootdown of Malaysia Airlines Flight 17 in Ukraine	38 Australian citizens were among those killed.
Benin	2014	1	Victims of the shootdown of Malaysia Airlines Flight 17 in Ukraine	
Palestine	2014	3	Palestinian victims of the 2014 Israel–Gaza conflict	
Turkey	2014	3	Palestinian victims of the 2014 Israel–Gaza conflict	
Northern Cyprus	2014	3	Palestinian victims of the 2014 Israel–Gaza conflict	
Pakistan	2014	1	Palestinian victims of the 2014 Israel–Gaza conflict	
Mali	2014	1	Palestinian victims of the 2014 Israel–Gaza conflict	July 25 was the day of mourning
Guinea	2014	7	Victims of the 2014 Conakry stampede	
Algeria	2014	3	Victims of the crash of Air Algérie Flight 5017 in Mali	
Burkina Faso	2014	2	Victims of the crash of Air Algérie Flight 5017 in Mali	
Benin	2014	1	Victims of the crash of Air Algérie Flight 5017 in Mali	
Lebanon	2014	1	Victims of the crash of Air Algérie Flight 5017 in Mali	
Austria	2014	1	Death of National Council President Barbara Prammer	Flags were at half mast
Brazil	2014	3	Death of Eduardo Campos	
Bosnia and Herzegovina	2014	1	Victims of the 2014 Zenica mine disaster	
Bulgaria	2014	1	Victims of the 2014 Gorni Lom explosions	
Niger	2014	3	Victims of an attack in Northern Mali	
Dominican Republic	2014	1	Death of Óscar de la Renta	
Dominican Republic	2014	3	Death of former Vice President Carlos Morales Troncoso	
Zambia	2014	1	Victims of the 2014 Kariba boat accident	
Zambia	2014	14	Death of President Michael Sata	National mourning from October 29 to November 11. All flags were lowered half-mast. Radio and TV stations interrupted their programs upon news of the president's death. Many events have been canceled or postponed.
Moldova	2014	1	Death of Constantin Tănase	
Belgium	2014	7	Death of former Queen Fabiola	
Vanuatu	2014	3	Death of former president Jean-Marie Léyé	Flags at half mast on December 9–11.
Pakistan	2014	3	Victims of the 2014 Peshawar school massacre	
Turkey	2014	1	Victims of the 2014 Peshawar school massacre	

== 2015–2019 ==
Country	Year	Days	Reason	Notes
France	2015	1	Victims of the Charlie Hebdo shooting	
Benin	2015	1	Victims of the Charlie Hebdo shooting	
Mozambique	2015	3	Victims of the Mozambique funeral beer poisoning	
Ukraine	2015	1	Victims of the Volnovakha bus attack	
Niger	2015	3	Victims of protests against Charlie Hebdo	
Benin	2015	1	Victims of protests against Charlie Hebdo	
Bahrain	2015	40	Death of King Abdullah of Saudi Arabia	40 days of official mourning, during which government institutions were closed for three days and the flag was lowered to half-mast.
Jordan	2015	40	Death of King Abdullah of Saudi Arabia	
Egypt	2015	7	Death of King Abdullah of Saudi Arabia	Flags at half-mast on all government and public buildings. Egypt canceled its January 25 revolution celebrations. Many public events were canceled or restricted.
Saudi Arabia	2015	3	Death of King Abdullah of Saudi Arabia	Sunday, January 25, was declared a public holiday for all government sectors and students at all stages of education but despite this flags were not at half mast.
Lebanon	2015	3	Death of King Abdullah of Saudi Arabia	The national flag was lowered on all government and public buildings.
Algeria	2015	3	Death of King Abdullah of Saudi Arabia	
Libya	2015	3	Death of King Abdullah of Saudi Arabia	
Mauritania	2015	3	Death of King Abdullah of Saudi Arabia	
Morocco	2015	3	Death of King Abdullah of Saudi Arabia	
Tunisia	2015	3	Death of King Abdullah of Saudi Arabia	
Kuwait	2015	3	Death of King Abdullah of Saudi Arabia	All government ministries and departments were closed for three days. Banks were closed for one day. Festivals and entertainment events were postponed.
UAE	2015	3	Death of King Abdullah of Saudi Arabia	
Qatar	2015	3	Death of King Abdullah of Saudi Arabia	National flags were lowered to half-mast. Several major events scheduled in Qatar were canceled, including scheduled Qatar Radio and Qatar TV programs. Quranic recitations were broadcast. Some events, including concerts, have been canceled.
Palestine	2015	3	Death of King Abdullah of Saudi Arabia	
Turkey	2015	1	Death of King Abdullah of Saudi Arabia	
India	2015	1	Death of King Abdullah of Saudi Arabia	January 24 was a day of national mourning. The national flag was flown at half-mast throughout India. No official artistic events were held on that day.
Pakistan	2015	1	Death of King Abdullah of Saudi Arabia	The national flag was lowered to half-mast on government, state and public buildings.
Bangladesh	2015	1	Death of King Abdullah of Saudi Arabia	January 24 is a day of national mourning. The national flag was lowered to half-mast in all government, semi-government, autonomous and public offices on the day of national mourning.
Bolivia	2015	3	Death of Carlos Villegas Quiroga	
Madagascar	2015	1	Victims of the Tropical Storm Chedza	
Ukraine	2015	1	Victims of the January 2015 Mariupol rocket attack	
Philippines	2015	1	Police officers killed in the Mamasapano clash	
Bulgaria	2015	1	Death of former President Zhelyu Zhelev	
Egypt	2015	7	Victims of the 2015 kidnapping and beheading of Copts in Libya	
Libya	2015	3	Victims of the 2015 kidnapping and beheading of Copts in Libya	
Haiti	2015	3	Victims of the 2015 Haiti carnival accident	
Niger	2015	3	Victims of the 2015 Abadam air strike	
Libya	2015	7	Victims of the February 2015 Egyptian airstrikes in Libya	
Ukraine	2015	1	Victims of the 2015 Zasyadko mine disaster	
Serbia	2015	1	Victims of the 2015 Belgrade helicopter crash	
Spain	2015	3	Victims of the crash of Germanwings Flight 9525	
Germany	2015	1	Victims of the crash of Germanwings Flight 9525	
Singapore	2015	7	Death of founding prime minister Lee Kuan Yew	The government declared a week long mourning period from 23 to 29 March 2015 for Lee Kuan Yew. Flags were lowered to half-mast as a mark of respect. Upon the announcement of his death, all free-to-air television channels and radio stations suspended their regular programming. Most events and activities were scaled down, postponed or cancelled completely throughout the mourning period. Entertainment outlets, such as cinemas, theatres, nightclubs and bars announced that they would be closed or operate under reduced hours during this period.
India	2015	1	Death of founding prime minister Lee Kuan Yew	
Bhutan	2015	1	Death of founding prime minister Lee Kuan Yew	
Portugal	2015	2	Death of Manoel de Oliveira	
Kenya	2015	3	Victims of the Garissa University College attack	
Ethiopia	2015	3	Victims of Islamic State killings	
Gabon	2015	3	Death of former acting president Rose Francine Rogombé	
Nepal	2015	3	Victims of April 2015 Nepal earthquake	
Bosnia and Herzegovina	2015	1	Victims of the 2015 Zvornik police station shooting	
Mali	2015	3	Victims of shipwrecks in the Mediterranean Sea and Niger River	
Macedonia	2015	2	6 police officers killed in gun battle	
Pakistan	2015	1	Victims of the 2015 Pakistan Army Mil Mi-17 crash	
Pakistan	2015	1	Victims of the 2015 Karachi bus shooting	
Singapore	2015	1	Victims of the 2015 Sabah earthquake	
Sabah (state of Malaysia)	2015	1	Victims of the 2015 Sabah earthquake	
Ghana	2015	3	Victims of the 2015 Accra explosion	
Georgia	2015	1	Victims of the 2015 Tbilisi flood	
Turkey	2015	3	Death of former president and Prime Minister Süleyman Demirel	
Northern Cyprus	2015	3	Death of former president and Prime Minister Süleyman Demirel	
Kuwait	2015	1	Victims of the 2015 Kuwait mosque bombing	
United Kingdom	2015	1	Victims of the 2015 Sousse attacks	30 of the victims were British tourists. National mourning on July 7 with flags at half mast. This is the only declaration of mourning in the UK that was not for a head of state or a member of the royal family.
Bahrain	2015	40	Death of former Saudi Ministry of Foreign Affairs Saud bin Faisal bin Abdulaziz Al Saud	
Jordan	2015	40	Death of former Saudi Ministry of Foreign Affairs Saud bin Faisal bin Abdulaziz Al Saud	
Egypt	2015	7	Death of former Saudi Ministry of Foreign Affairs Saud bin Faisal bin Abdulaziz Al Saud	
Qatar	2015	3	Death of former Saudi Ministry of Foreign Affairs Saud bin Faisal bin Abdulaziz Al Saud	
United Arab Emirates	2015	3	Death of former Saudi Ministry of Foreign Affairs Saud bin Faisal bin Abdulaziz Al Saud	
Oman	2015	3	Death of former Saudi Ministry of Foreign Affairs Saud bin Faisal bin Abdulaziz Al Saud	
Algeria	2015	3	Death of former Saudi Ministry of Foreign Affairs Saud bin Faisal bin Abdulaziz Al Saud	
Libya	2015	3	Death of former Saudi Ministry of Foreign Affairs Saud bin Faisal bin Abdulaziz Al Saud	
Tunisia	2015	3	Death of former Saudi Ministry of Foreign Affairs Saud bin Faisal bin Abdulaziz Al Saud	
Mauritania	2015	3	Death of former Saudi Ministry of Foreign Affairs Saud bin Faisal bin Abdulaziz Al Saud	
Lebanon	2015	3	Death of former Saudi Ministry of Foreign Affairs Saud bin Faisal bin Abdulaziz Al Saud	
Palestine	2015	3	Death of former Saudi Ministry of Foreign Affairs Saud bin Faisal bin Abdulaziz Al Saud	
Cape Verde	2015	2	Death of Corsino Fortes	
India	2015	7	Death of Former President A. P. J. Abdul Kalam	
Dominica	2015	2	Victims of Tropical Storm Erika	
Moldova	2015	1	Death of Mihai Volontir	
Guatemala	2015	3	Victims of the 2015 Guatemala landslide	
Benin	2015	3	Victims of the 2015 Mina crowd crush in Saudi Arabia	
Burkina Faso	2015	3	Victims of the 2015 Mina crowd crush in Saudi Arabia	
Iran	2015	3	Victims of the 2015 Mina crowd crush in Saudi Arabia	At least 464 Iranians were among those killed.
Mali	2015	3	Victims of the 2015 Mina crowd crush in Saudi Arabia	
Niger	2015	3	Victims of the 2015 Mina crowd crush in Saudi Arabia	
Senegal	2015	3	Victims of the 2015 Mina crowd crush in Saudi Arabia	
Cameroon	2015	1	Victims of the 2015 Mina crowd crush in Saudi Arabia	
Ivory Coast	2015	1	Victims of the 2015 Mina crowd crush in Saudi Arabia	
South Sudan	2015	3	Victims of the 2015 Maradi fire	
Panama	2015	1	Death of former President Eric Arturo Delvalle	
Central African Republic	2015	3	Victims of recent violence	
Turkey	2015	3	Victims of 2015 Ankara bombings	
Northern Cyprus	2015	3	Victims of 2015 Ankara bombings	
Marshall Islands	2015	30	Death of former president Jurelang Zedkaia	
Benin	2015	7	Death of former President Mathieu Kérékou	
Pakistan	2015	1	Victims of a suicide bombing	
Romania	2015	3	Victims of the Colectiv nightclub fire	
Russia	2015	1	Victims of the bombing of Metrojet Flight 9268	
Lebanon	2015	1	Victims of 2015 Beirut bombings	
France	2015	3	Victims of the November 2015 Paris attacks	National mourning on November 15–17. State flags were lowered to half mast on all government, local government and public buildings. All state schools and universities in Paris remained closed the next day, sports events in France for the weekend of 14–15 November were postponed or cancelled. Many concerts and events have been cancelled. Disneyland Paris, which had operated every day since opening in 1992, closed its parks as a mark of respect for those who died in the attacks. The Eiffel Tower, a Paris landmark visited by 20,000 people a day, was closed for two days. Other venues that were to remain closed included shops and cinemas.
Monaco	2015	3	Victims of the November 2015 Paris attacks	A minute of silence was held on November 16 the port of Monaco was closed and the fireworks celebration on the 18th was cancelled
Mauritius	2015	2	Victims of the November 2015 Paris attacks	
Hungary	2015	1	Victims of the November 2015 Paris attacks	
Croatia	2015	1	Victims of the November 2015 Paris attacks	
Republic of Srpska	2015	1	Victims of the November 2015 Paris attacks	
Kosovo	2015	1	Victims of the November 2015 Paris attacks	
Latvia	2015	1	Victims of the November 2015 Paris attacks	
Moldova	2015	1	Victims of the November 2015 Paris attacks	
European Union	2015	1	Victims of the November 2015 Paris attacks	European Day of Mourning and a minute of silence.
Benin	2015	1	Victims of the November 2015 Paris attacks	
Mali	2015	3	Victims of 2015 Bamako hotel attack	
Guinea	2015	3	Victims of 2015 Bamako hotel attack	
Mauritania	2015	3	Victims of 2015 Bamako hotel attack	
Senegal	2015	3	Victims of 2015 Bamako hotel attack	
South Korea	2015	5	Death of former President of South Korea Kim Young-sam	
Azerbaijan	2015	1	Victims of a fire at an oil rig in Caspian Sea	
Algeria	2015	8	Death of Hocine Aït Ahmed	
Puerto Rico	2015	3	Murder of police officers in Ponce	
Northern Mariana Islands	2016	1	Death of governor Eloy Inos	
Pakistan	2016	1	Victims of the January 2016 Pakistan attack	
Costa Rica	2016	1	Victims of a boat accident in Nicaragua	
Nepal	2016	3	Death of former Prime Minister Sushil Koirala	
Burkina Faso	2016	3	Victims of an Islamist militants attack	
Taiwan	2016	1	Victims of the 2016 southern Taiwan earthquake	Flags at half mast.
South Ossetia	2016	1	Death of Tamerlan Aguzarov	
Solomon Islands	2016	1	Death of Peter Kenilorea	
Ivory Coast	2016	3	Victims of the Grand-Bassam shootings	
Sri Lanka	2016	1	Death of Galagama Sri Aththadassi Thera	
Palestine	2016	1	Victims of a bus crash in Jordan	
Malta	2016	3	Death of Joseph Mercieca	The Maltese flags were half mast at government buildings
Dominican Republic	2016	1	Death of Claudio Caamaño	
Belgium	2016	3	Victims of the 2016 Brussels bombings	
Romania	2016	1	Victims of the 2016 Brussels bombings	
Croatia	2016	1	Victims of the 2016 Brussels bombings	
Lithuania	2016	1	Victims of the 2016 Brussels bombings	
Serbia	2016	1	Victims of the 2016 Brussels bombings	
Moldova	2016	1	Victims of the 2016 Brussels bombings	
Malta	2016	1	Victims of the 2016 Brussels bombings	
Ethiopia	2016	2	Victims of April 2016 Ethiopian raid	
Chile	2016	3	Death of former President Patricio Aylwin	
Ecuador	2016	8	Victims of 2016 Ecuador earthquake	
Cape Verde	2016	2	Victims of an attack at a military barracks	
Burundi	2016	3	Death of former president of Burundi Jean-Baptiste Bagaza	
Sahrawi Arab Democratic Republic	2016	40	Death of President Mohamed Abdelaziz	
Algeria	2016	8	Death of President Mohamed Abdelaziz	
Mauritania	2016	3	Death of President Mohamed Abdelaziz	
Cuba	2016	2	Death of President Mohamed Abdelaziz	
Dominican Republic	2016	3	Death of former President Antonio Imbert Barrera	
Moldova	2016	1	Victims of 2016 Haragîș helicopter crash	
Kazakhstan	2016	1	Victims of the 2016 Aktobe shootings	
Turkey	2016	1	Victims of the 2016 Atatürk Airport attack	
Northern Cyprus	2016	1	Victims of the 2016 Atatürk Airport attack	
Bangladesh	2016	2	Victims of Dhaka cafe attack	
Iraq	2016	3	Victims of the 2016 Baghdad suicide bombing	
Trinidad and Tobago	2016	7	Death of former Prime Minister of Trinidad and Tobago Patrick Manning	Flags was flown at half-mast until day of funeral, which was on July 9.
Dominica	2016	2	Death of former Prime Minister of Trinidad and Tobago Patrick Manning	
France	2016	3	Victims of the 2016 Nice truck attack	
Andorra	2016	1	Victims of the 2016 Nice truck attack	
Northern Cyprus	2016	1	Victims of the 2016 Nice truck attack	
Mali	2016	3	Victims of the 2016 Nampala attack	
Abkhazia	2016	1	Death of writer Fazil Iskander	
Kosovo	2016	1	Victims of the 2016 Munich shooting	
Benin	2016	3	Death of former President Émile Derlin Zinsou	
Macedonia	2016	1	Victims of the 2016 Macedonian floods	
Brazil	2016	1	Death of Hélio Vieira Andrade	
Romania	2016	1	Death of former Queen-consort Anne of Romania	
Moldova	2016	1	Death of former Queen-consort Anne of Romania	
DR Congo	2016	3	Victims of the Beni massacre	
Bolivia	2016	3	Death of Rodolfo Illanes	
Italy	2016	2	Victims of the August 2016 Central Italy earthquake	30 August was the second day of national mourning
Romania	2016	1	Victims of the August 2016 Central Italy earthquake	11 Romanians were among those killed.
Kyrgyzstan	2016	1	Victims of a fire in Moscow and a road accident	14 Kyrgyzs died in the fire and another 9 in the accident.August 29 was the national day of mourning.
Uzbekistan	2016	3	Death of President Islam Karimov	TV programs suspended the normal program to broadcast coverage of the death of the president and radio stations played calm music. Entertainment venues closed and concerts canceled.
Cuba	2016	1	Death of President Islam Karimov	September 5 was a day of national mourning
Italy	2016	1	Death of former President Italy Carlo Azeglio Ciampi	
Cape Verde	2016	2	Death of former president António Mascarenhas Monteiro	
Haiti	2016	3	Victims of Hurricane Matthew	
Ethiopia	2016	3	Victims of the violences at 2016 Irreecha festival in Bishoftu	
Slovakia	2016	1	Death of former first President Michal Kováč	
Thailand	2016–17	365	Death of Thai King Bhumibol Adulyadej	After announcing his death for 30 days, all TV channels suspended regular programs and simultaneously broadcast special programs that consisted of monochrome films and photos of Bhumibol, as well as reports of royal events. International channels have also been blocked and replaced with this program. The government declared a year-long mourning period for Bhumibol. Citizens were asked to refrain from participating in "joyful events" and entertainment for 30 days following his death; as a result, a number of events, including sports (such as the Thai League football season, which ended entirely), were cancelled or postponed. Entertainment outlets such as cinemas, nightclubs and theatres closed for 30 days. October 14 was declared a day off from work.
Bhutan	2016	1	Death of Thai King Bhumibol Adulyadej	October 14 was declared a day of national mourning. The flags were lowered half-mast. Offices and schools were closed on that day.
Central African Republic	2016	1	Victims of the 2016 Kaga-Bandoro clashes	
Qatar	2016	3	Death of former Emir Khalifa bin Hamad Al Thani	
Cameroon	2016	1	Victims of the 2016 Eséka train derailment	
Uruguay	2016	1	Death of former President Jorge Batlle	On October 25, the day of the ex-president's funeral was a day of national mourning.
Sri Lanka	2016	7	Death of W. D. Amaradeva	
Costa Rica	2016	3	Victims of Hurricane Otto	
Ecuador	2016	3	Death of former President Sixto Durán Ballén	
Mozambique	2016	3	Victims of the Caphiridzange explosion	
Cuba	2016	9	Death of former Cuban President Fidel Castro	Place of entertainment and night clubs closed, public show and concerts were cancelled. Television broadcast patriotic and historical programs, and radio stations broadcast classical and mourning music.
Dominica	2016	9	Death of former Cuban President Fidel Castro	
Nicaragua	2016	9	Death of former Cuban President Fidel Castro	
Algeria	2016	8	Death of former Cuban President Fidel Castro	
Bolivia	2016	7	Death of former Cuban President Fidel Castro	
Equatorial Guinea	2016	3	Death of former Cuban President Fidel Castro	
North Korea	2016	3	Death of former Cuban President Fidel Castro	Flags were flown at half-staff.
Venezuela	2016	3	Death of former Cuban President Fidel Castro	Flags at half-mast on all government, state and public buildings. Canceled a music festival in Caracas and other public events in the country, and state television dedicated a special program to Castro, publicized with the slogan "Honor and Glory to Fidel.
Namibia	2016	3	Death of former Cuban President Fidel Castro	
Haiti	2016	3	Death of former Cuban President Fidel Castro	
Sahrawi Arab Democratic Republic	2016	3	Death of former Cuban President Fidel Castro	
Uruguay	2016	1	Death of former Cuban President Fidel Castro	
Vietnam	2016	1	Death of former Cuban President Fidel Castro	December 4 was a day of national mourning. On that day, all entertainment and cultural events were canceled.
Angola	2016	1	Death of former Cuban President Fidel Castro	
Trinidad and Tobago	2016	1	Death of former Cuban President Fidel Castro	
Brazil	2016	3	Victims of the crash of LaMia Flight 2933	
Costa Rica	2016	3	Death of former President Luis Alberto Monge	
India	2016	1	Death of J. Jayalalithaa	
Egypt	2016	3	Victims of Botroseya Church bombing	
Bulgaria	2016	1	Victims of the Hitrino train derailment	
Turkey	2016	1	Victims of the December 2016 Istanbul bombings	
Northern Cyprus	2016	1	Victims of the December 2016 Istanbul bombings	
Brazil	2016	3	Death of Paulo Evaristo Arns	
Dominican Republic	2016	3	Death of Mayobanex Vargas	
Russia	2016	1	Victims of the 2016 Russian Defence Ministry Tupolev Tu-154 crash	
Transnistria	2016	1	Victims of the 2016 Russian Defence Ministry Tupolev Tu-154 crash	
Belarus	2016	1	Victims of the 2016 Russian Defence Ministry Tupolev Tu-154 crash	
Donetsk People's Republic	2016	1	Victims of the 2016 Russian Defence Ministry Tupolev Tu-154 crash	
Sri Lanka	2016	1	Death of former Prime Minister Ratnasiri Wickremanayake	
Portugal	2017	3	Death of former president and Prime Minister Mário Soares	
Iran	2017	3	Death of former President Akbar Hashemi Rafsanjani	
Seychelles	2017	1	Death of former President James Mancham	
UAE	2017	3	5 diplomats killed in the January 2017 Kampala bombings	
Kyrgyzstan	2017	1	Victims of the crash of Turkish Airlines Flight 6491	
Mali	2017	3	Victims of the 2017 Gao attack	
Brazil	2017	3	Death of Teori Zavascki	
Iran	2017	1	Firefighters killed in the collapse of the Plasco Building	
Hungary	2017	1	Victims of the 2017 Verona bus crash	
Brazil	2017	3	Death of former First Lady Marisa Letícia Lula da Silva	
El Salvador	2017	3	Death of former President Carlos Humberto Romero	
Ukraine	2017	1	Victims of a tragedy at a mine	
Tonga	2017	10	Death of Queen Mother Halaevalu Mataʻaho ʻAhomeʻe	
Haiti	2017	6	Death of former President René Préval	
Sweden	2017	1	Victims of the 2017 Stockholm truck attack	
Guatemala	2017	3	Victims of the 2017 Guatemala orphanage fire	Flags at half mast.
Ethiopia	2017	3	Victims of a rubbish landslide	
Saint Kitts and Nevis	2017	1	Death of former governor Probyn Inniss	National mourning on March 23.
Senegal	2017	3	Victims of a fire at a Muslim religious retreat	
Botswana	2017	3	Death of former President Ketumile Masire	
Mauritania	2017	3	Death of former junta leader Ely Ould Mohamed Vall	
Afghanistan	2017	1	Victims of the 2017 Camp Shaheen attack	
Kyrgyzstan	2017	1	Victims of the 2017 Kyrgyzstan mudslides	
Zambia	2017	3	Death of Salome Kapwepwe	
Finland	2017	1	Death of former president and Prime Minister Mauno Koivisto	
Greece	2017	4	Death of former Prime Minister Konstantinos Mitsotakis	
Vanuatu	2017	10	Death of President Baldwin Lonsdale	
Portugal	2017	3	Victims of the June 2017 Portugal wildfires	
Greenland	2017	1	Victims of the 2017 Greenland tsunami	
Cameroon	2017	2	Sinking of a Military vessel	July 28–29 were days of mourning
Sierra Leone	2017	7	Victims of the 2017 Sierra Leone mudslides	
South Ossetia	2017	1	Death of Poet Nafi Jusoita	
Spain	2017	3	Victims of the 2017 Barcelona attacks	
Gibraltar	2017	3	Victims of the 2017 Barcelona attacks	
Portugal	2017	1	Victims of a fallen tree which killed 13 people in Madeira	3 days of mourning at regional level, 1 day of mourning at national level.
Kosovo	2017	1	Death of former Prime Minister of Kosovo Bajram Rexhepi	
Mexico	2017	3	Victims of the 2017 Chiapas earthquake	
Mexico	2017	3	Victims of the 2017 Puebla earthquake	
Iraq	2017	3	Death of former President Jalal Talabani	
Kurdistan	2017	7	Death of former President Jalal Talabani	The Kurdistan Regional Government declared 7 days of mourning
Costa Rica	2017	3	Victims of Hurricane Nate	
Minas Gerais (state of Brazil)	2017	3	Victims of the Janaúba massacre	
Somalia	2017	3	Victims of the 14 October 2017 Mogadishu bombings	
Portugal	2017	3	Victims of the October 2017 Iberian wildfires	
Namibia	2017	3	Death of Angelika Kazetjindire Muharukua	
Goiás (state of Brazil)	2017	3	Victims of the Goyases School shooting	
Malta	2017	1	Murder of journalist Daphne Caruana Galizia	
Iran	2017	1	Victims of the 2017 Iran–Iraq earthquake	
Greece	2017	1	Victims of 2017 West Attica floods	
Egypt	2017	3	Victims of 2017 Sinai mosque attack	
Turkey	2017	1	Victims of 2017 Sinai mosque attack	
Georgia	2017	1	Victims of fire at Leogrand Hotel in Batumi	
Romania	2017	3	Death of former King Michael I	
Namibia	2017	4	Death of Isak Ashinkono Shoome	
DR Congo	2018	2	Victims of the January 2018 DR Congo floods	
Senegal	2018	2	Victims of a massacre	
Iran	2018	1	Victims of the Sanchi oil tanker collision	
United Arab Emirates	2018	3	Death of Sheikha Hessa bint Mohammed bin Khalifa Al Nahyan	
Afghanistan	2018	1	Victims of the 2018 Kabul bombings	
Kiribati	2018	3	Victims of the sinking of the MV Butiraoi	
East Timor	2018	3	Death of former President Francisco Xavier do Amaral	
Venezuela	2018	3	Death of José Antonio Abreu	
Russia	2018	1	Victims of the 2018 Kemerovo fire	
Belarus	2018	1	Victims of the 2018 Kemerovo fire	
Palestine	2018	1	Victims of the 2018 Israel-Gaza conflict	
South Africa	2018	10	Death of former First Lady of South Africa Winnie Madikizela-Mandela	
Georgia	2018	1	Victims of an accident on Tkibuli Mindeli mine	
Sahrawi Arab Democratic Republic	2018	7	Victims of the 2018 Algerian Air Force Ilyushin Il-76 crash	
Algeria	2018	3	Victims of the 2018 Algerian Air Force Ilyushin Il-76 crash	
South Sudan	2018	3	Death of army chief James Ajongo Mawut	
Bulgaria	2018	1	Victims of a bus accident on the Trakia motorway	
Central African Republic	2018	3	Victims of the 2018 Fatima church attack	
Puerto Rico	2018	9	Victims of the 2018 U.S. Air National Guard C-130 crash	
Turkey	2018	3	Victims of 2018 Israel-Gaza conflict	
Cuba	2018	2	Victims of Cubana de Aviación Flight 972	Official period of mourning from 6 am on May 19 to 12 midnight on May 20.
Portugal	2018	1	Death of António Arnaut	
Uganda	2018	3	Victims of the 2018 Kiryandongo bus accident	
Dominican Republic	2018	1	Death of Joseíto Mateo	
Namibia	2018	4	Death of Auguste Mukwahepo	
Kosovo	2018	1	Death of Fadil Vokrri	
Zambia	2018	3	Death of Victoria Kalima	
Guyana	2018	1	Murder of multiple fisherman Off Suriname's coast	
Georgia	2018	1	Victims of an accident on Mindeli Coal Mine Mining	
Greece	2018	3	Victims of the 2018 Greece wildfires	
Paraguay	2018	3	Victims of July 2018 Paraguay plane crash	
Croatia	2018	1	Death of Oliver Dragojevic	
India	2018	1	Death of M. Karunanidhi, former Chief Minister of Tamil Nadu	
India	2018	7	Death of former Prime Minister Atal Bihari Vajpayee	Most schools, offices and companies were closed on Friday as a sign of respect after the death of the former prime minister. All entertainment and cultural events during the national mourning have been canceled.
Ghana	2018	7	Death of Kofi Annan	
Italy	2018	1	Victims of Ponte Morandi collapse	
Dominican Republic	2018	1	Death of Rafael Calventi Gaviño and Ramón Rodríguez	
Bulgaria	2018	1	Victims of a bus accident near Svoge	
Donetsk People's Republic	2018	3	Assassination of prime minister Alexander Zakharchenko	National mourning on September 1–3.
Luhansk People's Republic	2018	3	Assassination of prime minister Alexander Zakharchenko	
Abkhazia	2018	1	Death of prime minister Gennadi Gagulia	National mourning on September 12.
Tanzania	2018	4	Victims of the Sinking of MV Nyerere	
Zambia	2018	1	Victims of an accident near Mokopane	
Cuba	2018	3	Death of President Tran Dai Quang	Official mourning on 22 and 23 September and national mourning on 24 September.The decree also states that public shows and festive activities will be suspended during the mourning period.
Vietnam	2018	2	Death of President Tran Dai Quang	Entertainment and cultural events canceled.
Laos	2018	2	Death of President Tran Dai Quang	Entertainment and cultural events canceled.
Democratic Republic of the Congo	2018	3	Victims of the Mbuba road tanker explosion	
Armenia	2018	1	Death of Charles Aznavour	
Artsakh	2018	1	Death of Charles Aznavour	
Bosnia and Herzegovina	2018	1	Killing of 2 police officers in a crossfire with car robbers	October 29 was day of mourning.
Central African Republic	2018	3	Victims of the 2018 Alindao clashes	
Uganda	2018	1	Victims of an accident on Lake Victoria	
United States	2018	1	Death of former U.S. President George H. W. Bush	Federal agencies and departments were closed.
Kosovo	2018	1	Death of former U.S. President George H. W. Bush	
Namibia	2018	4	Death of Matias Ndakolo	
Ethiopia	2018	1	Death of former President Girma Wolde-Giorgis	
Poland	2018	1	Victims of a mine accident in the Czech Republic	12 Polish citizens were among those killed.
Iran	2018	1	Death of Mahmoud Hashemi Shahroudi	
Kosovo	2018	1	Death of Izet Demaj	
Nigeria	2018/19	3	Death of former president Shehu Shagari	
Poland	2019	2	Assassination of Gdańsk Mayor Paweł Adamowicz	
Georgia	2019	1	Victims of an explosion in a residential building in Tbilisi's Didi Digomi district	
Colombia	2019	3	Victims of 2019 Bogotá car bombing	
Namibia	2019	4	Death of Peter Kagadhinwa Nambundunga	
Zambia	2019	3	Death of former Vice President Lupando Mwape	
Poland	2019	2	Death of former Prime Minister Jan Olszewski	
North Macedonia	2019	2	Victims of a bus crash near Gostivar	
Philippines	2019	1	Death of Francisco Mañosa	
Liberia	2019	1	Victims of the 2019 Gbonepea landslide	
Portugal	2019	1	Victims of domestic violence	By March, 13 people had died of domestic violence in Portugal.
Seychelles	2019	1	Death of former President France Albert Rene	
African Union	2019	3	Victims of the crash of Ethiopian Airlines Flight 302	
Ethiopia	2019	1	Victims of the crash of Ethiopian Airlines Flight 302	
Mauritania	2019	3	Death of former president Mohamed Mahmoud Ould Louly	
New Zealand	2019	1	Victims of Christchurch mosque shootings	
Pakistan	2019	1	Victims of Christchurch mosque shootings	
India	2019	1	Death of Goa Chief Minister Manohar Parrikar	
Mozambique	2019	3	Victims of Cyclone Idai	
Zimbabwe	2019	2	Victims of Cyclone Idai	
Mali	2019	3	Victims of Ogossagou massacre	
Iraq	2019	3	Victims of 2019 Tigris River ferry sinking	
Peru	2019	3	Death of former President Alan Garcia	
Portugal	2019	3	Victims of the 2019 Madeira bus crash	
Democratic Republic of the Congo	2019	1	Victims of 2019 Lake Kivu boat accident	
Sri Lanka	2019	1	Victims of the 2019 Sri Lanka Easter bombings	
Luxembourg	2019	12	Death of former Grand Duke Jean, Grand Duke of Luxembourg	
São Tomé and Príncipe	2019	3	Victims of the sinking of the Amfiriti	
South Africa	2019	7	Victims of 2019 Durban Easter floods	
Ethiopia	2019	1	Death of former President Negasso Gidada	
Equatorial Guinea	2019	7	Death of Minister of Presidential Security Antonio Mba Nguema Mikué	Mourning set just in military bases
Niger	2019	3	Victims of a fuel truck explosion	
Spain	2019	2	Death of former first Deputy Prime Minister Alfredo Pérez Rubalcaba	
Albania	2019	1	Death of an army officer	
São Paulo (state of Brazil)	2019	3	Victims of the Suzano massacre	
Lebanon	2019	2	Death of Nasrallah Sfeir	The Council of Ministers decreed two days of national mourning, on May 15 and 16. On the day of the funeral, May 16, public and private offices will remain closed. Even Catholic schools will remain closed. There will be silence in television broadcasts.
Ecuador	2019	4	Death of Julio César Trujillo	
Central African Republic	2019	3	Victims of a massacre in Paoua	
Namibia	2019	4	Death of Nickey Iyambo	
Portugal	2019	1	Death of writer Agustina Bessa-Luís	
Mali	2019	3	Victims of Sobane Da village massacre	
Cape Verde	2019	2	Death of Paulino do Livramento Évora	
Jamaica	2019	4	Death of former Prime Minister Edward Seaga	
Cyprus	2019	3	Death of former President Demetris Christofias	
Peru	2019	2	Death of Minister of Defence José Huerta	
Ethiopia	2019	1	Victims of the 2019 Amhara Region coup attempt	
United Arab Emirates	2019	3	Death of Khalid bin Sultan Al Qasimi	
Argentina	2019	3	Death of former President Fernando de la Rúa	
Dominican Republic	2019	1	Death of Hugo Tolentino Dipp	
Tunisia	2019	7	Death of President Beji Caid Essebsi	The government also decided to cancel all artistic performances and other cultural events across Tunisia, according to a statement from the government presidency
Egypt	2019	3	Death of President Beji Caid Essebsi	
African Union	2019	3	Death of President Beji Caid Essebsi	
Algeria	2019	3	Death of President Beji Caid Essebsi	
Libya	2019	3	Death of President Beji Caid Essebsi	
Lebanon	2019	3	Death of President Beji Caid Essebsi	
Jordan	2019	3	Death of President Beji Caid Essebsi	
Palestine	2019	3	Death of President Beji Caid Essebsi	
Mauritania	2019	3	Death of President Beji Caid Essebsi	
Cuba	2019	1	Death of President Beji Caid Essebsi	
Somalia	2019	3	Death of Abdirahman Omar Osman	
Tanzania	2019	3	Victims of the Morogoro tanker explosion	
Burkina Faso	2019	3	Victims of an attack	
Gambia	2019	7	Death of first President Dawda Jawara	Initially was 3 days of mourning
Zimbabwe	2019	8	Death of former President Robert Mugabe	
Sahrawi Arab Democratic Republic	2019	3	Death of former President Robert Mugabe	
Kenya	2019	3	Death of former President Robert Mugabe	
Indonesia	2019	3	Death of former President B. J. Habibie	
Bahamas	2019	1	Victims of Hurricane Dorian	
Chad	2019	3	Death of former President Lol Mahamat Choua	
Liberia	2019	1	Victims of a fire at a religious boarding school outside the Liberian capital Monrovia	
Tonga	2019	1	Death of Prime Minister Akilisi Pohiva	
Andorra	2019	3	Death of former French President Jacques Chirac	
France	2019	1	Death of former French President Jacques Chirac	September 30, the day of the funeral - the day of national mourning. The flags were lowered half-mast.
Lebanon	2019	1	Death of former French President Jacques Chirac	September 30, the day of the funeral - the day of national mourning. The flags were lowered half-mast.
Portugal	2019	1	Death of former interim Prime Minister Diogo Freitas do Amaral	
Czech Republic	2019	1	Death of Karel Gott	October 12, the day of the funeral - the day of national mourning. Flags lowered half-mast.
Mali	2019	3	Victims of 2019 Mali attacks	
Cape Verde	2019	2	Death of Julio Herbert Lopes	
Burkina Faso	2019	3	Victims of 2019 attack on a convoy transporting local employees of Canadian mining company Semafo in eastern Burkina Faso	
Benin	2019	1	Death of Albert Tévoédjrè	
Cameroon	2019	1	Victims of the 2019 Cameroon mudslides	
Slovakia	2019	1	Victims of a bus crash in Nitra	November 15 was declared a day of national mourning. The flags were lowered half-mast.
UAE	2019	3	Death of Sheikh Sultan bin Zayed Al Nahyan	
Cambodia	2019	1	Death of Cambodia Princess Norodom Bopha Devi	
Liberia	2019	1	Death of Charles Brumskine	
Albania	2019	1	Victims of the 2019 Albania earthquake	
Kosovo	2019	1	Victims of the 2019 Albania earthquake	Kosovo has an ethnic Albanian majority population.
Ukraine	2019	1	Victims of a fire at a college in Odesa	
Niger	2019	3	Victims of 2019 Niger attack	
Chile	2019	2	Victims of the 2019 Chilean Air Force C-130 crash	
Algeria	2019	3	Death of Algerian army chief Ahmed Gaid Salah	Also, 7 days of mourning was announced in military institutions
Burkina Faso	2019	2	Victims of the Arbinda attack	
Kazakhstan	2019	1	Victims of Bek Air Flight 2100	
Iraq	2019–20	3	Those killed in the U.S. airstrikes against Kata'ib Hezbollah	Mourning period began on New Year's Eve.

== See also ==
- National day of mourning
  - List of national days of mourning (before 2000)
  - List of national days of mourning (2020–present)
- International day of mourning, a similar concept at the international level
- European Day of Mourning, a similar concept at the EU level
- Arab League Day of Mourning, a similar concept at the Arabian level

== Notes ==
a.	Bangladesh decrees mourning day for both tragedies
