= Death and state funeral of Atal Bihari Vajpayee =

2018 death of former Indian prime minister

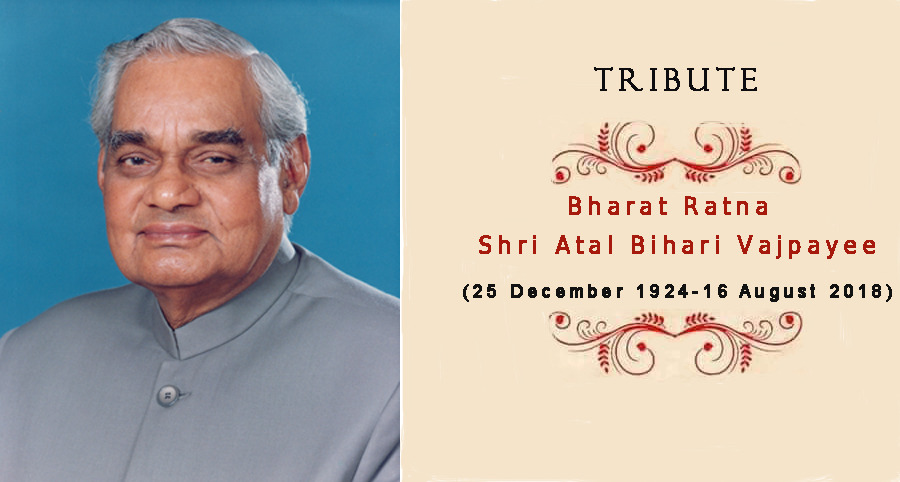
- Official portrait, 2004
- Date: 16 August 2018 (date of death); 17 August 2018 (date of state funeral)
- Location: AIIMS, Delhi (death) Rashtriya Smriti Sthal, Delhi (state funeral)

On 16 August 2018, Atal Bihari Vajpayee, the 10th prime minister of India, died due to various health complications at the age of 93. He was given a state funeral on 17 August 2018. His lying in state occurred at the Bharatiya Janata Party headquarters in Delhi.

== Background ==
Vajpayee had a stroke in 2009, which impaired his speech. His health had been a major source of concern; reports said he was reliant on a wheelchair and failed to recognize people. He also had dementia and long-term diabetes. For many years, he had not attended any public engagements and rarely ventured out of the house, except for checkups at the All India Institutes of Medical Sciences.

On 11 June 2018, Vajpayee was admitted to All India Institutes of Medical Science in New Delihi, India in critical condition following a kidney infection. He was officially declared dead there at 5:05 pm IST on 16 August 2018 at the age of 93. Some sources claim that he had died on the previous day.

== State funeral ==
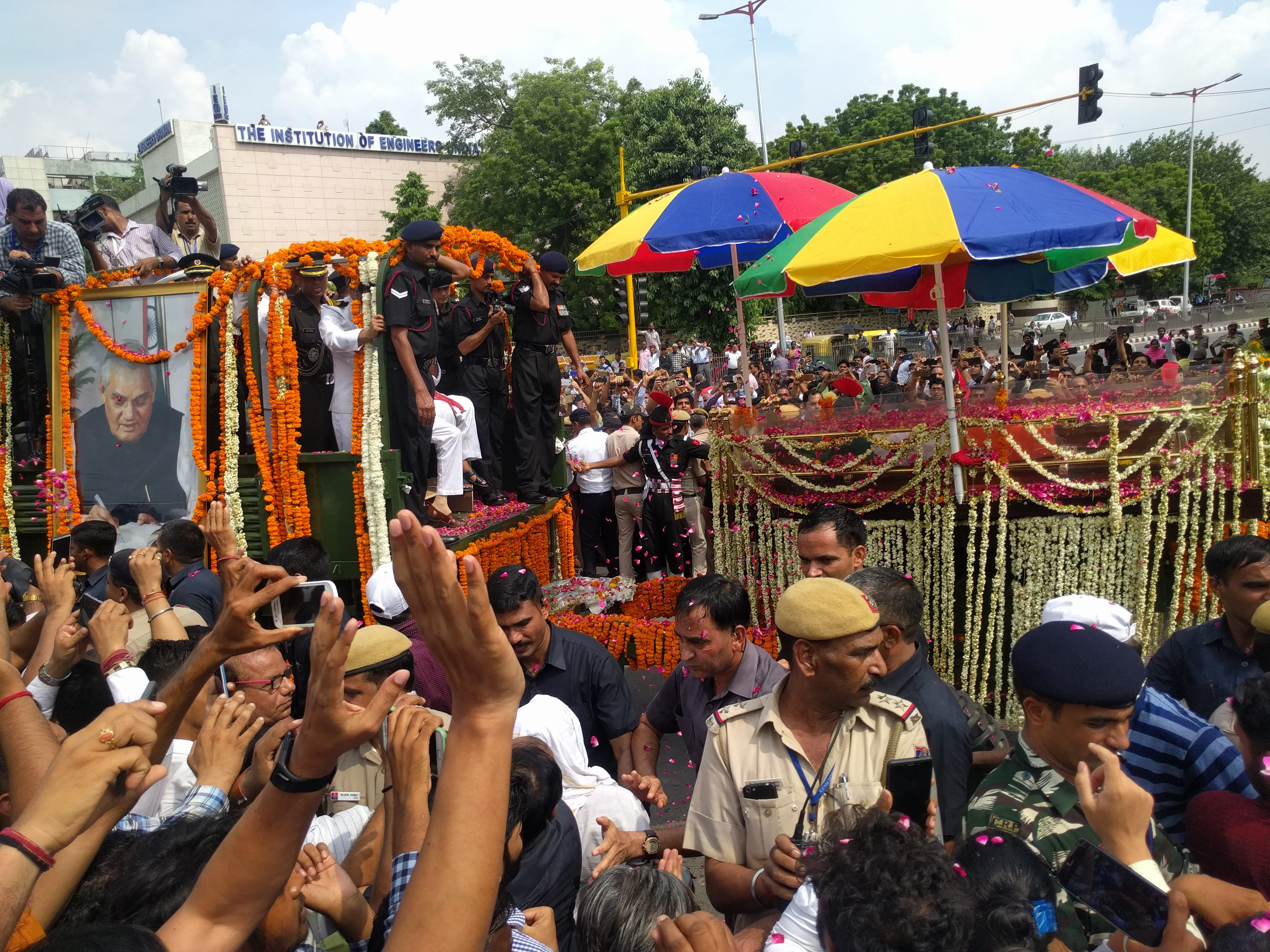
Vajpayee's funeral procession moving to Smriti Sthal near Raj Ghat for last rites.

On the morning of 17 August, Vajpayee's body, draped with the Indian flag, was taken to the Bharatiya Janata Party headquarters where party workers paid their tributes until 1 pm. Later that afternoon at 4 pm, Vajpayee was cremated with full state honours at Rashtriya Smriti Sthal near Raj Ghat, and his pyre was lit by his foster daughter Namita Kaul Bhattacharya. Thousands of people and many dignitaries attended his funeral procession, including Prime Minister Narendra Modi and President Ram Nath Kovind. On 19 August, his ashes were immersed in Ganga river at Haridwar by Namita.

== Reactions ==
India reacted to Vajpayee's death with grief and thousands of tributes poured in through social media platforms. Thousands of people paid their respects during his funeral procession. A seven-day state mourning was announced by the central government throughout India. The national flag flew half-mast during this period.

- Afghanistan: Former Afghan President Hamid Karzai was among several foreign dignitaries present at former prime minister Atal Bihari Vajpayee's funeral in New Delhi. He recalled that the departed leader was "the first to offer us civilian planes, Airbuses at the time we were starting out".
- Bangladesh: Bangladesh Prime Minister Sheikh Hasina expressed "deep shock" at the demise of former Indian Prime Minister Atal Bihari Vajpayee and said it is a day of great sadness for the people of Bangladesh. Paying tribute to Vajpayee, Hasina termed him as "one of the most famous sons of India" and a highly respected person in Bangladesh.
- Bhutan: Bhutan king Jigme Khesar Namgyel Wangchuck attended the funeral ceremony in New Delhi.
- China: In a statement, the ministry of foreign affairs said the Indian leader was an "outstanding Indian statesman and had made outstanding contributions to the development of Sino-Indian relations". "China expresses its deep condolences on his death and sincere condolences to the Indian government and people and the relatives of Mr. Vajpayee. Premier Li Keqiang has sent a condolence message to the leaders of India," the statement said.
- Israel: Prime Minister of Israel Benjamin Netanyahu conveyed his condolences calling Vajpayee "a true friend of Israel". Foreign Ministry of Israel also extended its condolences on the passing of Vajpayee and in a statement described him as "a genuine friend of Israel".
- Japan: Remembering Vajpayee's visit to Japan in 2001, the Japanese Prime Minister Shinzō Abe said, "On behalf of the Government and people of Japan, I would like to convey my sincerest condolences to the Government and people of India and the bereaved family. His Excellency Vajpayee visited Japan in 2001 as the then-Prime Minister and made significant contributions to the friendship between our two countries as a good friend of Japan. It is him who established the cornerstone of Japan-India relations today". Terming Vajpayee as an eminent leader of India, Abe added, "I pray from the bottom of my heart that his soul may rest in peace".
- Mauritius: On 17 August, the government of Mauritius announced that both Mauritian and Indian flags would fly at half mast in the honour of Vajpayee. During the World Hindi Conference in Mauritius, PM Pravind Jugnauth announced that the cyber tower towards which Vajpayee contributed to be set up in Mauritius would be henceforth named as Atal Bihari Vajpayee tower.
- Pakistan: Pakistan's interim Minister for Law and Information Syed Ali Zafar met External Affairs Minister Sushma Swaraj and extended Pakistan's condolence on the death of former prime minister Atal Bihari Vajpayee. Zafar was among the foreign dignitaries who attended Vajpayee's funeral in New Delhi.
- Russia: Russian President Vladimir Putin sent a message of condolences to President Ram Nath Kovind and Prime Minister Narendra Modi on the demise of Vajpayee. Putin termed the former prime minister as "outstanding statesman". "Atal Bihari Vajpayee rightly commanded great respect around the world. He will be remembered as a politician who made a major personal contribution to the friendly relations and privileged strategic partnership between our countries. The President of Russia conveyed words of sincere sympathy and support to the family of the deceased, the Government and the people of India", the message read.
- Sri Lanka: Various Sri Lankan leaders paid rich tribute to the three-time PM, hailing him as a "friend of Sri Lanka". In a tweet President Maithripala Sirisena said: "Today, we have lost a great humanist and a true friend of Sri Lanka. Former Prime Minister of India Atal Bihari Vajpayee was a visionary leader and an ardent defender of democracy. My condolences to his family and millions of his admirers around the world". Leader of Opposition R. Sampanthan said that India has lost one of its "most regarded intellectual[s] and [statesmen]". "He served the great country of India with humility and honesty, and he was much loved and respected by millions of people across the world. Former three-time Prime Minister Vajpayee is also an exceptional orator and a leader with a great sense of humor, his speeches within the Indian parliament and outside will always be remembered", he said in a statement, extending his condolences on behalf of the Tamil people of Sri Lanka.
- United States: U.S. Secretary of State Michael Pompeo said Vajpayee recognised early on that the US-India partnership would contribute to the world's economic prosperity and security and the two democracies would continue to benefit from his vision. "On behalf of the people of the United States of America, I extend my heartfelt condolences to the people of India on the recent passing of former prime minister Atal Bihari Vajpayee", Pompeo said in a statement yesterday. He recalled Vajpayee's address to the Congress in 2000, when he had famously characterised US-India ties as a "natural partnership of shared endeavours". "Today, our two countries and our bilateral relationship continue to benefit from Prime Minister Vajpayee vision, which helped promote expanded cooperation", Pompeo said. He said the American people stand with the people of India "as we mourn Prime Minister Vajpayee's passing".

== Memorial ==
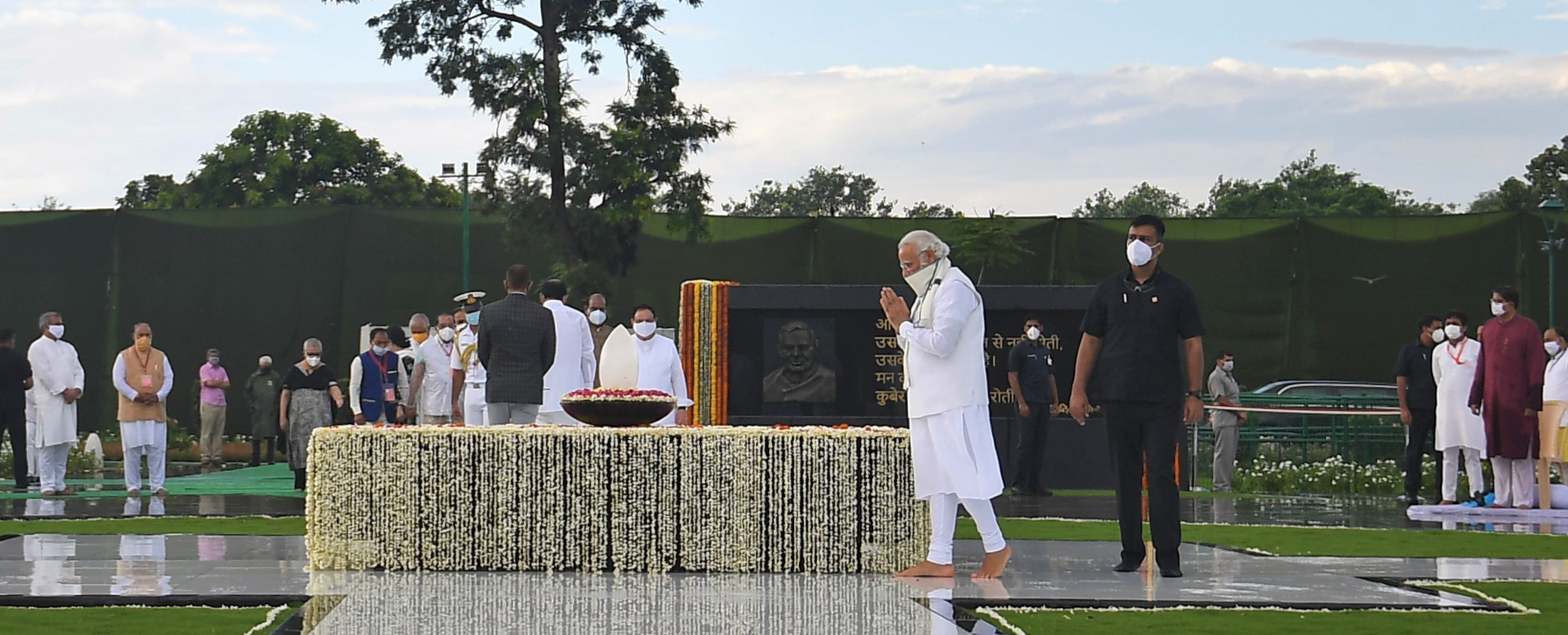
Prime Minister Modi paying tribute to Atal Bihari Vajpayee at his memorial.

Government of India has built the memorial of Vajpayee at Raj Ghat named Sadaiv Atal.

== See also ==
- Premiership of Atal Bihari Vajpayee
- List of things named after Atal Bihari Vajpayee
