= Amfitriti =

Place in Greece

- Settlement
- Location within Greece
- Coordinates: 40°53′28″N 25°55′7″E
- Country: Greece
- Administrative region: East Macedonia and Thrace
- Regional unit: Evros
- Municipality: Alexandroupoli
- Municipal unit: Alexandroupoli
- Community: Alexandroupoli

Population (2021)
  - Total: 140
- Time zone: UTC+2 (EET)
  - Summer (DST): UTC+3 (EEST)
- Postal code: 68100
- Area code: 25510
- Vehicle registration: EB

Amfitriti is a village in Evros regional unit, East Macedonia and Thrace, Greece. It is part of the community of Alexandroupoli.
