= Louis Joseph Quinn =

Missionary priest

Rev. Louis Joseph Quinn C.M., S.F.M.
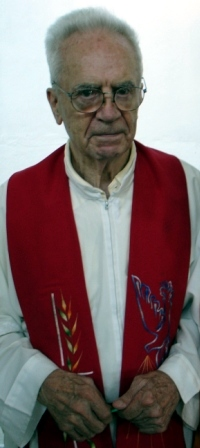
- Missionary Priest, Father Louis
- Born: January 12, 1928; England
- Died: October 11, 2007 (aged 79); Florida, United States
- Resting place: Dominican Republic
- Other names: Padre Luis, Father Lou
- Occupation: Missionary Priest
- Known for: Devoted to the welfare of the people of San José de Ocoa.

Louis Joseph Quinn, C.M., S.F.M. (January 12, 1928 – October 11, 2007), also known as Padre Luis, and Father Lou, was a Scarboro Missions missionary Roman Catholic priest from Scarborough Ontario, Canada who is known for his humanitarian and missionary work in the province of San José de Ocoa, Dominican Republic.

Since 1953, he has devoted himself, with great compassion, courage and determination, to the welfare of the people of the Dominican Republic. Widely respected by all who know him, he has helped bring about a great many changes in vital services in the Republic, including sanitation, health care, construction, reforestation and irrigation.

Father Louis had a dream of eradicating poverty in the Dominican Republic.

Because of his humanitarian efforts was awarded membership to the Order of Canada on October 19, 1994, for which he received on March 1, 1995.

Louis died in a Florida hospital after cardiac surgery at the age of 79. His body was returned to the Dominican Republic for his funeral and burial in a coffin made of pine, which was of the same fashion as the people he helped, as he had requested himself prior to his death.
