= 2019 Durban Easter floods =

2019 flooding in Durban, South Africa

- Date: 18–22 April 2019
- Location: Durban, Ballito, KwaZulu-Natal
- Deaths: 85+
- Property damage: $77.6 million (2019 USD)

During the 2019 Easter weekend, the coastal city of Durban, South Africa, experienced severe flooding, caused by torrential rain brought on by a steep upper air trough, which deepened into low pressure in the upper levels of the atmosphere, and impacted the city and its surrounding areas starting 18 April 2019. The floods resulted in at least 70 deaths caused by collapsed buildings, mudslides and sinkholes. It was one of the deadliest disasters to hit the country in the 2010s.

== Cause ==
Weather forecasters stated that the flooding was caused due to a cutoff low pressure system, which is often known to cause severe storms. The South African weather service later revealed that 165mm of rain fell over the city on 22 April 2019, breaking the previous record of 108mm that fell on October 10, 2017. It was also the heaviest rainfall the city has experienced in a 24-hour period since October 30, 1985.

== Impacted areas ==
Flooding, landslides, collapsed buildings and rivers bursting their banks were reported all along the south of Durban, with the hardest-hit areas being eMlazi, eManzimtoti, Chatsworth, Malvern and Queensburgh. Other areas affected include Mount Edgecombe and Virginia Airport. King Shaka International Airport, which is further north, reported lighter rainfall during the period, however, this came days after another storm caused significant infrastructural damage in Ballito, which is roughly 20 km south of Stanger. On the south coast, Port Edward recorded, Margate, Pennington and Paddock reported massive rainfall. The Eastern Cape was also hard hit, with Port St Johns recording 190mm of rainfall.

=== Death toll ===
By April 25, 2019, acting KwaZulu-Natal Premier Sihle Zikalala stated in a press briefing that the death toll has been risen from an initial 51, to 70. It was also revealed that at least 1000 people have been left displaced following the floods. Later on April 25, MEC for Co-operative Governance and Traditional Affairs Nomusa Dube-Ncube said that the death toll had now increased to 85.

=== Damage cost ===
The premier of KwaZulu-Natal Willies Mchunu said that the estimated damage of the flooding reached R1.1 billion (US$77.6 million). Damage in Durban alone were at R650 million (US$45.9 million).

== Reactions ==
South African president Cyril Ramaphosa said he had been given the green light by National Treasury that there are emergency funds available to assist affected families. "Money will be mobilized to assist our people. These are emergencies that are budgeted for, so resources will be mobilized in the biggest way so that people currently in need are assisted". Ramaphosa was forced to cut short his trip to the African Union Troika Summit in Egypt.

The South African National Defense Force was also immediately deployed in order to assist with flood relief.

Political parties in South Africa later called for the ANC and KZN Department of Cooperative Governance to immediately release disaster relief funds and urgently get to work on rebuilding homes and providing adequate shelter to all the affected communities.

== Aftermath ==
=== Flood relief ===
The United Nations Office for Outer Space Affairs (UNOOSA), announced an initiative to aid in flood relief in the country by activating the International Charter "Space and Major Disasters" on behalf of the National Disaster Management Centre (NDC). Multiple non-profit organisations rallied together to aid with the handing out of food, clothing and shelter to those displaced as a result of destroyed homes, while a crowd-funded initiative raised R24 000 under 20 hours, with NPO's later setting out several drop-off points for the public to assist in sponsoring items to those affected.

Naspers Chief People Officer Aileen O’Toole, revealed that the company as donated R1 million to aid in flood relief and urged other companies to follow through with donations. Coca-Cola South Africa's Regional Public Affairs and Communications Manager, Nolundi Mzimba, revealed that the company donated R600 000 towards relief efforts and that companies will also be partnering with local communities, employees and Plastics SA to help with clean up following the floods subsiding.

=== Pollution ===
Following the floods subsiding, Durban acting port manager Nokuzola Nkowane said in a release that operating divisions were carrying out assessments to establish the full extent of damage caused by the storm, and revealed that Durban port's pollution control teams had been on-site cleaning up the debris within port waters, aided by cleanup from other companies. Due to the significant amount of water that was brought on land from the ocean and rivers, several beaches and river boundaries left behind significant plastic pollution resulting in massive uproar from multiple communities of the state of pollution in the country. Greenpeace Africa stated that the Durban Floods have really brought to light the huge plastic pollution crisis in South Africa, and urged communities to begin a cleanup process. The massive pollution in the Durban port also resulted in movement of ships in Durban harbour limited by mass debris pile-up Lindsay Hopkins, project director at Breathe Ocean Conservation, told News24 on April 25, that several organisations that are mobilizing people to assist in cleanups. Cleanup processes were expected to take over a month to complete.
