= 2011–12 Lokomotiv Yaroslavl season =

Suspended season of play of professional ice hockey team

The 2011–12 Lokomotiv Yaroslavl season was the franchise's 52nd season of play in professional ice hockey in Russia. It was supposed to be its fourth season in the Kontinental Hockey League (KHL). The season was scheduled to start on 8 September 2011. However, on 7 September, while traveling to their season opener, the team's plane crashed, killing 44 people, including 25 roster players, and 11 members of the team staff. Alexander Galimov survived the initial impact of the crash with severe injuries, but died on 12 September. Another roster player, Maxim Zyuzyakin, did not travel with the team on the plane. As a consequence, the league cancelled the 7 September Opening Cup game between Salavat Yulaev and Atlant already in progress, postponing the opening of the KHL season until 12 September.

Following the tragedy, Lokomotiv Yaroslavl chose to cancel their participation in the 2011–12 KHL season. Instead, the club participated in the 2011–12 season of the Russian Major League (VHL), the second top ice hockey league in Russia after the KHL, starting in December 2011, and was eligible for the VHL playoffs. Also, Lokomotiv Yaroslavl's squad for the 2012–13 KHL season would automatically be qualified for the KHL playoffs that season, and the club could request allowance to use more than six non-Russian players in the KHL squad.

== Off-season ==
Lokomotiv lost in the 2011 KHL Western Conference finals 4–2 to Atlant. Following this playoff disappointment, eleven players (most notably former NHLers Daniel Tjärnqvist and Alexander Korolyuk) left the team, and nine players were added to the roster for the upcoming 2011–12 KHL season. The players set to make their debut with the team notably included former NHLers Ruslan Salei and Kārlis Skrastiņš. Also set to make their coaching debuts were former NHLers Brad McCrimmon and Igor Korolev.

== Pre-season ==
The team played nine pre-season games, finishing with a 7–2 record, and won their second straight Latvian Railways Cup ( 23–27 August), a pre-season KHL tournament. On 3 September, the players played their final game, at home against Torpedo, winning 5–2. Alexander Galimov, the final victim of the crash, scored the last goal of that game, sealing the win for Lokomotiv with an empty net goal.

2011 pre-season game log: 7–2–0
#	Date	Visitor	Score	Home	OT/SO	Decision	Reference
1	10 August (in Visp, Switzerland)	Lokomotiv	7 – 2	EHC Visp		Liv
2	12 August (in Leukerbad, Switzerland)	Lokomotiv	3 – 4	SC Bern		Liv
3	13 August (in Leukerbad, Switzerland)	Lokomotiv	5 – 1	HC Ambrì-Piotta		Vyukhin
4	23 August (in Riga, Latvia)	Lokomotiv	2 – 3	Neftekhimik	SO	Vyukhin
5	24 August (in Riga, Latvia)	Lokomotiv	1 – 0	Atlant		Liv
6	26 August (in Riga, Latvia)	Lokomotiv	3 – 0	Dinamo Minsk		Liv
7	27 August (in Riga, Latvia)	Lokomotiv	3 – 0	Neftekhimik		Liv
8	1 September	Severstal	3 – 5	Lokomotiv		Vyukhin
9	3 September	Torpedo	2 – 5	Lokomotiv		Liv

=== Crash ===
All players and most of the team staff were killed on 7 September 2011 when the Yak-Service Yak-42 that was chartered by the team crashed on takeoff from Tunoshna Airport in Yaroslavl, into the Volga River. Alexander Galimov survived the crash, but died five days later of his injuries. Goalie coach Jorma Valtonen and forward Maxim Zyuzyakin were not on the flight.

== Rebuilding the team ==
It was announced by KHL president Alexander Medvedev that a disaster draft would be conducted to assemble a new team for Lokomotiv Yaroslavl. Every other team in the league would select up to three players for the pool of 40–45 players for Lokomotiv to select in the disaster draft, which selected up to 14 players, as five players were promoted from Lokomotiv's youth team, and forward Maxim Zyuzyakin, who did not travel with the team, formed the core of the roster before the start of the disaster draft. The drafted players will continue to receive salaries from their respective teams. Lokomotiv's former coach Petr Vorobiev was hired as the new head coach. On 10 September, at the team's public memorial service, team president Yuri Yakovlev announced that Lokomotiv would not participate in the 2011–12 KHL season.

Instead, the club participated in the 2011–12 season of the Russian Major League (VHL), the second top ice hockey league in Russia after the KHL. In October 2011, the team announced that its first game in the VHL would take place on 12 December 2011 at home ice. Players between 17 and 22 years old under contract to KHL and VHL teams were made available for Lokomotiv to build a roster.

== Schedule and results ==
=== Regular season ===
2011–12 game log: 13–6–3 (home: 9–1–2; road: 4–5–1)
December: 3–2–0 (home: 2–1–0; road: 1–1–0)

Game	December	Opponent	Score	Record
1	12	Neftyanik Almetyevsk	5–1	1–0–0
2	14	Ariada-Akpars Volzhsk	2–0	2–0–0
3	20	@ Molot-Prikamye Perm	2–3 OT	2–0–1
4	22	@ Izhstal Izhevsk	4–1	3–0–1
5	28	HC Donbass	3–4 OT	3–0–2

January: 4–3–1 (home: 3–0–1; road: 1–3–0)

Game	January	Opponent	Score	Record
6	6	Titan Klin	4–2	4–0–2
7	10	@ Rubin Tyumen	2–4	4–1–2
8	12	@ Zauralie Kurgan	1–3	4–2–2
9	14	@ Mechel Chelyabinsk	3–4	4–3–2
10	16	@ Yuzhny Ural Orsk	3–2	5–3–2
11	25	Lada Togliatti	3–1	6–3–2
12	27	Kristall Saratov	4–0	7–3–2
13	29	Dizel Penza	3–4 SO	7–3–3

February: 6–3–0 (home: 4–0–0; road: 2–3–0)

Game	February	Opponent	Score	Record
14	3	HC Ryazan	4–0	8–3–3
15	5	Dynamo Tver	6–3	9–3–3
16	12	@ Kazzinc-Torpedo	4–1	10–3–3
17	14	@ Ermak Angarsk	2–4	10–4–3
18	17	@ Sokol Krasnoyarsk	3–2	11–4–3
19	22	HC VMF St. Petersburg	3–2	12–4–3
20	24	HC Sarov	4–0	13–4–3
21	27	@ Sputnik Nizhny Tagil	1–2	13–5–3
22	29	@ Toros Neftekamsk	2–4	13–6–3

=== Playoffs ===
2012 VHL playoffs: 5–5
Quarterfinals: 3–2

Game	March	Opponent	Score	Record
1	6	HC VMF	0–2	0–1
2	7	HC VMF	4–1	1–1
3	10	@ HC VMF	4–3	2–1
4	11	@ HC VMF	2–3 (OT)	2–2
5	14	HC VMF	2–1	3–2

Semifinals: 2–3

Game	March	Opponent	Score	Record
1	18	@ Dizel Penza	3–2 (OT)	1–0
2	19	@ Dizel Penza	2–1 (OT)	1–1
3	22	Dizel Penza	2–0	2–1
4	23	Dizel Penza	1–2	2–2
5	26	@ Dizel Penza	1–3	2–3

== Team at the time of crash ==
Remembered 7 September 2011.

No.	Nat	Player	Pos	S/G	Age	Acquired	Birthplace
57	(Russia)	Vitaly Anikeyenko	D	R	24	2005	Kiev, Ukrainian SSR
39	(Russia)	Mikhail Balandin	D	L	31	2011	Lipetsk, Russian SFSR
21	(Russia)	Gennady Churilov	C	L	24	2005	Magnitogorsk, Russian SFSR
38	(Slovakia)	Pavol Demitra	C	L	36	2010	Dubnica nad Váhom, Czechoslovakia
20	(Germany)	Robert Dietrich	D	L	25	2011	Ordzhonikidze, Ukrainian SSR
11	(Russia)	Alexander Galimov	RW	L	26	2004	Yaroslavl, Russian SFSR
74	(Russia)	Marat Kalimulin	D	R	23	2010	Togliatti, Russian SFSR
28	(Russia)	Alexander Kalyanin	RW	L	23	2008	Chelyabinsk, Russian SFSR
83	(Russia)	Andrei Kiryukhin	RW	L	24	2005	Yaroslavl, Russian SFSR
23	(Russia)	Nikita Klyukin	C	L	21	2005	Rybinsk, Russian SFSR
1	(Sweden)	Stefan Liv	G	L	30	2011	Gdynia, Poland
15	(Czech Republic)	Jan Marek	C	R	31	2011	Jindřichův Hradec, Czechoslovakia
32	(Russia)	Sergei Ostapchuk	LW	R	21	2007	Novopolotsk, Byelorussian SSR
4	(Czech Republic)	Karel Rachůnek (C)	D	R	32	2010	Gottwaldov, Czechoslovakia
24	(Belarus)	Ruslan Salei	D	L	36	2011	Minsk, Byelorussian SSR
52	(Russia)	Maxim Shuvalov	D	L	18	2010	Rybinsk, Russia
37	(Latvia)	Kārlis Skrastiņš	D	R	37	2011	Riga, Latvia
69	(Russia)	Pavel Snurnitsyn	F	L	19	2009	Yaroslavl, Russia
13	(Russia)	Daniil Sobchenko	C	L	20	2007	Kiev, Ukrainian SSR
17	(Russia)	Ivan Tkachenko (A)	LW	L	31	2001	Yaroslavl, Russian SFSR
3	(Russia)	Pavel Trakhanov	D	L	33	2011	Moscow, Russian SFSR
81	(Russia)	Yuri Urychev	D	R	20	2009	Yaroslavl, Russian SFSR
63	(Czech Republic)	Josef Vasicek (A)	C	L	30	2008	Havlíčkův Brod, Czechoslovakia
18	(Russia)	Alexander Vasyunov	LW	R	23	2011	Yaroslavl, Russian SFSR
35	(Ukraine)	Alexander Vyukhin	G	L	38	2010	Sverdlovsk, Russian SFSR
72	(Russia)	Artem Yarchuk	LW	L	21	2010	Yaroslavl, Russian SFSR
61	(Russia)	Maxim Zyuzyakin*	F	R	20	2008	Novokuznetsk, Russian SFSR

=== Staff ===
Person	Age	Country	Title
Brad McCrimmon	52	(Canada)	Head coach
Alexander Karpovtsev	41	(Russia)	Assistant coach
Igor Korolev	41	(Russia) / (Canada)	Assistant coach
Jorma Valtonen*	64	(Finland)	Goalie coach
Yuri Bakhvalov	-	-	physician/massage therapist
Aleksandr Belyayev	-	-	Equipment manager/massage therapist
Nikolai Krivonosov	31	(Belarus)	Fitness coach
Yevgeni Kunnov	-	-	Massage therapist
Vyacheslav Kuznetsov	-	-	Massage therapist
Vladimir Piskunov	52	(Russia)	Administrator
Yevgeni Sidorov	-	-	Coach-analyst
Andrei Zimin	-	-	Team doctor

- Zyuzyakin and Valtonen were the only club members not aboard the plane.
