= Lokomotiv Yaroslavl plane crash =

2011 aviation accident in Russia

Lokomotiv Yaroslavl plane crash YAK-Service Flight 9633
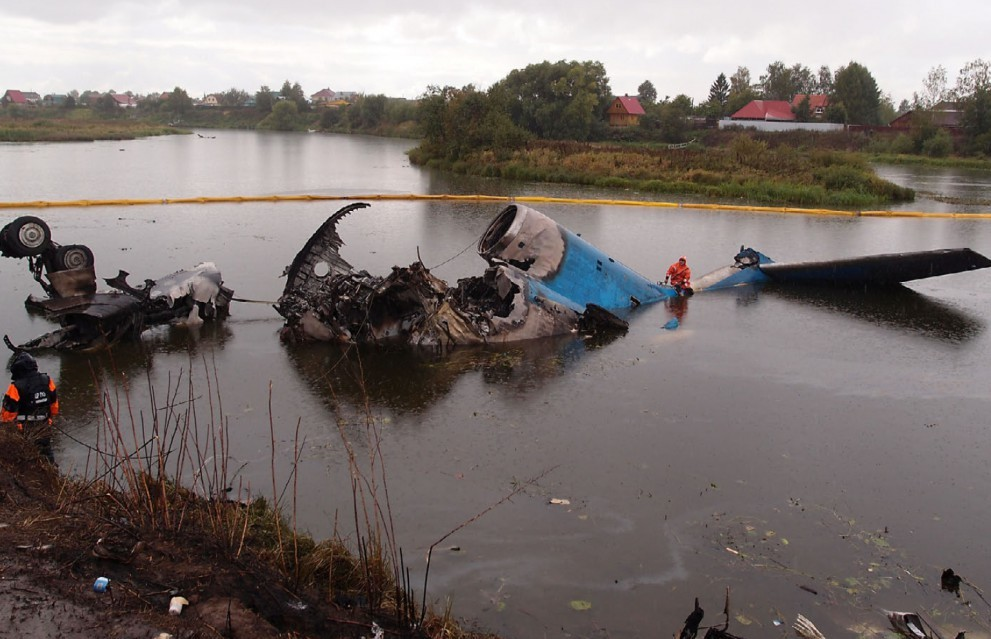
- Wreckage of the plane's tail section in the Volga River

Accident
- Date: 7 September 2011
- Summary: Stalled and crashed during take-off caused by improper takeoff configuration leading to runway overrun
- Site: 2 km (1.2 mi) west of Tunoshna Airport, Yaroslavl, Yaroslavl Oblast, Russia; 57°33′01″N 40°07′18″E

Aircraft
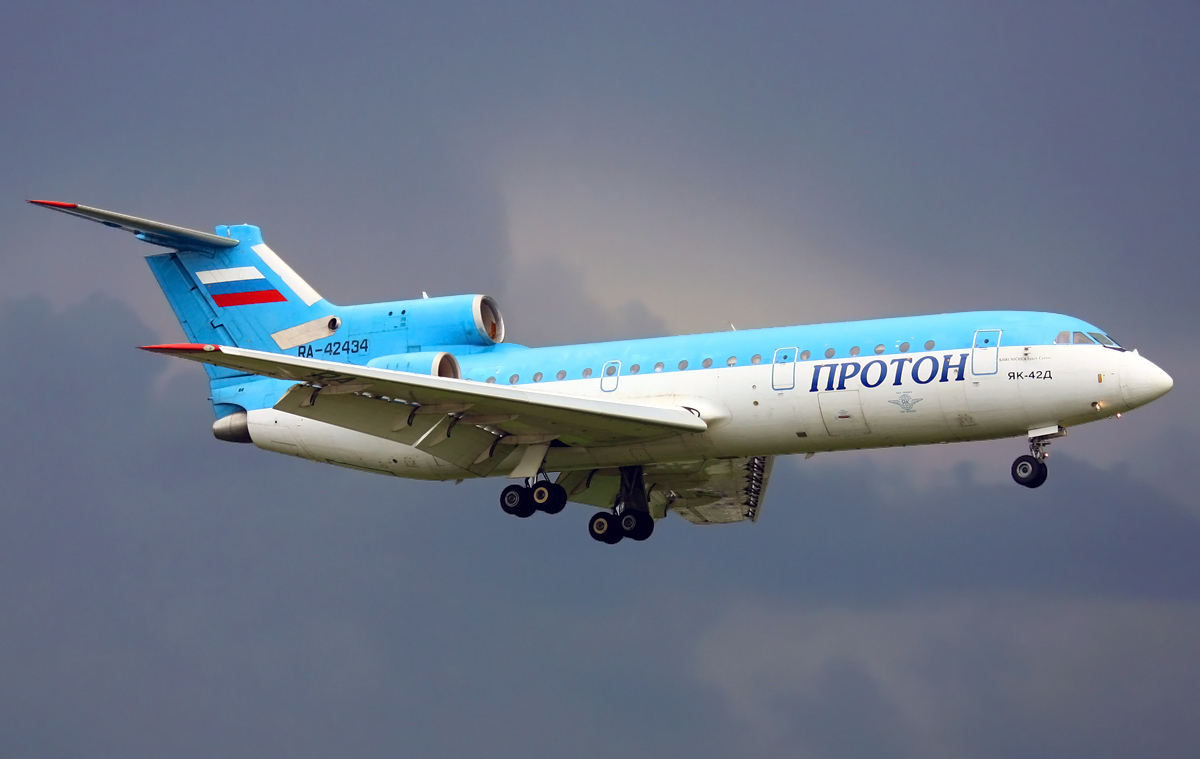
- RA-42434, the aircraft involved in the accident, photographed in May 2011
- Aircraft type: Yakovlev Yak-42D
- Operator: YAK-Service
- ICAO flight No.: AKY9633
- Call sign: 434
- Registration: RA-42434
- Flight origin: Tunoshna Airport, Yaroslavl, Yaroslavl Oblast, Russia
- Destination: Minsk National Airport, Minsk, Minsk Oblast, Belarus
- Occupants: 45
- Passengers: 37
- Crew: 8
- Fatalities: 44
- Injuries: 1
- Survivors: 1

On 7 September 2011, YAK-Service Flight 9633, a Yakovlev Yak-42 carrying players and coaching staff of the Lokomotiv Yaroslavl professional ice hockey team, crashed during take-off near Yaroslavl, Yaroslavl Oblast, Russia. All but one of the 45 people on board were killed. The aircraft overran the runway at Tunoshna Airport before briefly lifting off, striking an antenna mast, catching fire, and crashing on the bank of the Volga river. The tragedy is commonly known as the Lokomotiv hockey team disaster.

Lokomotiv Yaroslavl, a member of the Kontinental Hockey League (KHL), was on its way to Minsk, Belarus, to start the 2011–12 season. All players from the main roster (with the exception of Maxim Zyuzyakin) and four from the youth team were on board and died in the accident. The only survivor was the aircraft's mechanic; one player also survived the crash, but died in the following days from injuries.

The subsequent investigation determined that several factors contributed to the accident, including poor training; the incorrect calculation of the take-off speed by the flight crew; and the inadvertent application of wheel braking by one of the pilots, who had improperly placed his feet on the pedals. It was later revealed that the pilot had used falsified documents to obtain permission to fly the aircraft, and that both crew members lacked the training necessary to fly the Yak-42.

== Background ==
At the time of the crash, Lokomotiv Yaroslavl, established in 1959, was one of the top ice hockey teams in Russia. The team won the Russian Open Championship in 1997, 2002 and 2003, and were finalists in 2008 and 2009, making it to the third round of the playoffs in four straight seasons. Lokomotiv lost in the 2010 KHL Western Conference finals 4–3 to HC MVD, and lost in the 2011 KHL Western Conference Finals 4–2 to Atlant Moscow Oblast. Several players were about to make their debut with the team, including former National Hockey League (NHL) players Ruslan Salei and Kārlis Skrastiņš. Also set to make their coaching debuts were former NHL players Igor Korolev and Brad McCrimmon.

The accident was the second plane crash in Russia involving a hockey team. In 1950, the entire VVS Moscow team died in a plane crash near Sverdlovsk (now known as Yekaterinburg) in Sverdlovsk Oblast.

=== YAK-Service ===
In 2009, YAK-Service, the airline operating the accident aircraft, had been investigated by the European Commission over airworthiness and air safety concerns. Russian authorities imposed restrictions on the carrier, and made YAK-Service subject to ramp inspections to international standards. In May 2010, the Russian Ministry of Transport prohibited YAK-Service from flying into European Civil Aviation Conference airspace, a restriction that was lifted the following August. The European Commission, however, was not satisfied that mandatory equipment was present on all YAK-Service aircraft, and banned two of the company's Yakovlev Yak-40s from operating in European airspace.

== Accident ==
On 7 September 2011, the weather at Tunoshna Airport was good, with light winds, good visibility and a temperature of 18 °C (64 °F). The Yak-42, registered as RA-42434, entered Runway 05/23 at taxiway 5, located 300 metres (980 ft) from the runway threshold. Runway 05/23 was 3,000 metres (9,800 ft) long, leaving 2,700 metres (8,900 ft) for the take-off run. After the aircraft was cleared for take-off, it accelerated to an estimated 230 km/h (120 kn; 140 mph) but failed to lift off. The Yak-42 ran off past the end of the runway for 400 m (1,300 ft) before lifting off. The left wing tip then struck an antenna mast located about 450 metres (1,480 ft) from the end of the runway, and rapidly rotated to an attitude of 20° nose-up, reaching a height of 5–6 metres (16–20 ft) from the ground.

Following the aircraft’s impact with the mast, it veered left and crashed on the riverbank of the Tunoshonka River, 200 metres (660 ft) from where it joins the Volga, losing its tail assembly on impact while the front part of the jet disintegrated. The tail section came to rest in the water, while the rest of the fuselage ended up on dry land. The location of the wreckage was approximately 2 kilometres (1.2 mi) from the end of the runway.

Witness reports described the aircraft as "bursting into flames" after hitting the mast. Another witness report described the engines as going silent seconds before the crash. Yet another report indicated that the aircraft hit trees before it crashed. Debris from the aircraft was found just past the mast site, continuing from that point to the crash site. The crew did not report any technical problems to air traffic control. The plane's left wing struck the mast when it struggled to become airborne.

== Aircraft ==
The aircraft involved, a Yakovlev Yak-42D with registration RA-42434 and serial number 4520424305017, was manufactured in 1993. After serving with several airlines, it joined the Yak-Service fleet.

The Yak-42, a three-engine medium-range passenger jet, was designed with a 36-year service life, and RA-42434 still had an estimated 60% of its service life remaining. According to Deputy Transport Minister Valery Okulov, one of the three engines on the aircraft had been replaced a month prior to the crash. The aircraft was due to be taken out of service at the end of 2011 for a scheduled major overhaul.

== Passengers and crew ==
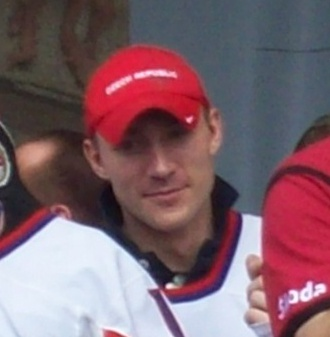
Karel Rachůnek was the team captain at the time of the crash.

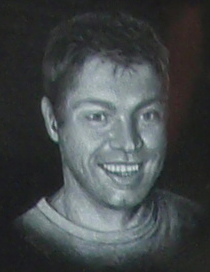
Josef Vašíček led the team in goals in the preceding season.

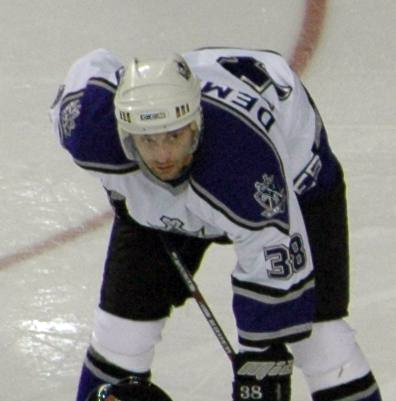
Pavol Demitra was a three-time All-Star in the NHL.

The aircraft manifest listed eight crew members and 37 passengers. The flight crew was composed of Captain Andrei Anatolievich Solomentsev (Russian: Андрей Анатолиевич Соломенцев), who had 6,900 hours of flight experience of which 1,500 were on Yak-42s; First Officer Igor Konstantinovich Zhevelov (Russian: Игорь Константинович Жевелов), with 13,500 hours' experience of which only 614 were on Yak-42s; and Flight Engineer Sergei Valerievich Zhuravlev (Russian: Сергей Валериевич Журавьлев). The flight's mechanic, Alexander Sizov, who travelled in the passenger cabin, was the only survivor of the crash. Alexander Galimov, one of the team players on board, was found alive and hospitalized, but died five days later. The bodies of the victims were all recovered from the scene.

According to eyewitnesses, both Galimov and Sizov were severely burned, but were conscious while being rescued. Both men were transported to Moscow for treatment. The two were placed in medically induced comas to relieve stress; however, Galimov died on 12 September at the Vishnevsky Institute of Surgery. Sizov was moved from intensive care to a ward on 12 September, and his life was considered to be out of danger. He was discharged from the hospital on 28 October.

=== Hockey players killed ===
Twenty-six players of the Lokomotiv Yaroslavl ice hockey team were killed:

Player	Age	Country	Position
Vitaly Anikeyenko (Note: This player had dual citizenship (Russian and Ukrainian, although dual citizenship is not recognized in Ukraine).)	24	Russia	D
Mikhail Balandin	31	Russia	D
Gennady Churilov	24	Russia	C
Pavol Demitra	36	Slovakia	C
Robert Dietrich	25	Germany	D
Alexander Galimov	26	Russia	LW
Marat Kalimulin	23	Russia	D
Alexander Kalyanin	23	Russia	RW
Andrei Kiryukhin	24	Russia	RW
Nikita Klyukin	21	Russia	C
Stefan Liv	30	Sweden	G
Jan Marek	31	Czech Republic	C
Sergei Ostapchuk	21	Belarus	LW
Karel Rachůnek	32	Czech Republic	D
Ruslan Salei	36	Belarus	D
Maxim Shuvalov	18	Russia	D
Kārlis Skrastiņš	37	Latvia	D
Pavel Snurnitsyn	19	Russia	F
Daniil Sobchenko	20	Russia	C
Ivan Tkachenko	31	Russia	LW
Pavel Trakhanov	33	Russia	D
Yuri Urychev (Note: Urychev was injured and suspended at the time and was not originally scheduled to fly to the game, but he volunteered to go to support the team even though he was not able to play. Forward Maxim Zyuzyakin, 20, was left behind in Yaroslavl.)	20	Russia	D
Josef Vašíček	30	Czech Republic	C
Alexander Vasyunov	23	Russia	LW
Alexander Vyukhin	38	Ukraine	G
Artem Yarchuk	21	Russia	LW

=== Team staff killed ===
Among the team staff on board were:

Name	Age	Country	Position
Alexander Karpovtsev	41	Russia	Assistant coach
Igor Korolev (Note: Korolev became a naturalized Canadian citizen in 2000 but had dual Russian and Canadian citizenship.)	41	Canada	Assistant coach
Brad McCrimmon	52	Canada	Head coach

Goalkeeper coach Jorma Valtonen was not on the aircraft as he stayed behind to work with the junior team.

== Reactions ==
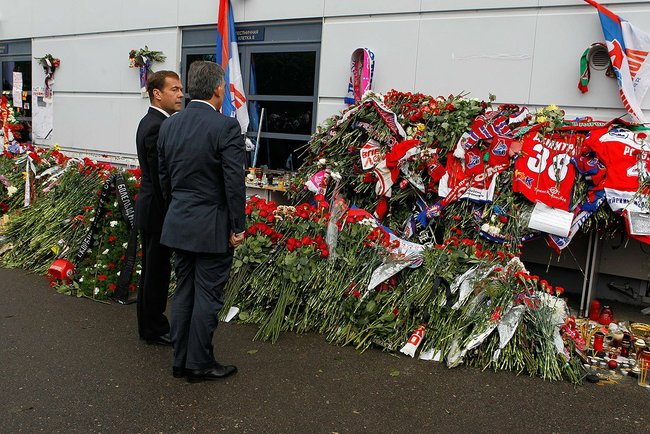
Russian president Dmitry Medvedev and Turkish president Abdullah Gül laying flowers outside Arena-2000 in Yaroslavl on 8 September.

Russian president Dmitry Medvedev, who had been on his way to Yaroslavl for the Yaroslavl Global Policy Forum, sent his condolences to the families of those killed in the crash and visited the crash site along with governor of Yaroslavl Oblast, Sergey Vakhrukov. René Fasel, president of the International Ice Hockey Federation, called the crash "the darkest day in the history of our sport." Manchester United chief executive David Gill wrote to the Russian side to offer support and sympathy after hearing of the tragedy, which bore unsettling similarities to the Munich air disaster which cost 23 United players, staff and journalists their lives in 1958.

Early into New York Islanders training camp, goaltender Evgeni Nabokov, having played the previous season in the KHL, expressed shock and sadness at the news.

Upon hearing the news of the accident, KHL officials stopped the Salavat Yulaev Ufa–Atlant Moscow Oblast game that was being played. The game was suspended in the second period, and KHL president Alexander Medvedev addressed the audience at the game, informing them of the details of the tragedy. A minute of silence was held and the audience exited the arena. Russian Ice Hockey Federation president Vladislav Tretiak promised: "We will do our best to ensure that hockey in Yaroslavl does not die, and that it continues to live for the people that were on that plane." The following day in Minsk, at the arena where Yaroslavl was to play its first game of the season, a special "hockey funeral" was held. The KHL resumed its 2011–12 season on 12 September 2011, with seven games. All games were preceded with a minute of silence.

City officials in Yaroslavl announced a three-day period of mourning from Friday 9 September 2011 to Sunday 11 September 2011. On 10 September, memorial services for the players were held in their mother countries. The biggest services were held in Arena 2000, the home arena of Lokomotiv Yaroslavl, with thousands of mourners as well as Russian prime minister Vladimir Putin in attendance. Local police determined the crowd number at Lokomotiv's home arena to be roughly 100,000.

Lokomotiv executives met to discuss the team's future. In the discussion, team president Yuri Yakovlev announced that Lokomotiv would not participate in the 2011–12 KHL season. On 12 September 2011, Lokomotiv marketing manager Evgeny Chuev said that another memorial, this time specifically for Galimov, would be held on 13 September.

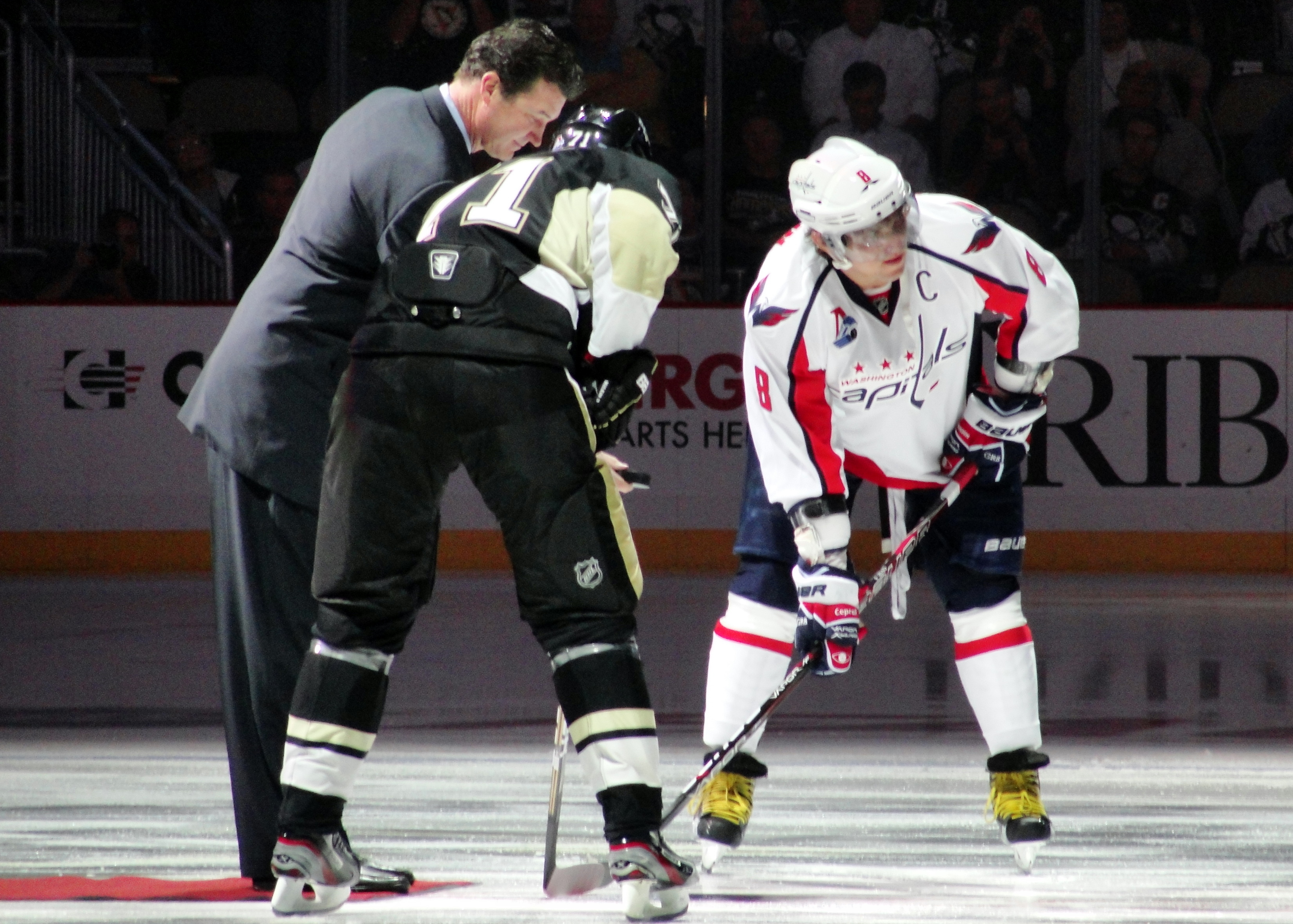
Mario Lemieux joins Evgeni Malkin and Alexander Ovechkin for the ceremonial puck drop before 13 October 2011 game between the Penguins and Capitals.

In the United States, the Dallas Stars, the team which Kārlis Skrastiņš played for the previous two seasons, honored their former teammate by placing a decal with Skrastiņš's number (37) on the helmets of their players. Josef Vašíček's former NHL team, the Carolina Hurricanes, wore a commemorative patch on their jerseys during the season. The Detroit Red Wings wore a patch on their 2011–2012 uniforms with the initials of Ruslan Salei, who had played for Detroit during the previous season. The patch the Red Wings wore also honored Brad McCrimmon, who had played for the team and been an assistant coach, and Stefan Liv, who was drafted by Detroit and played for their minor-league team. Furthermore, the Anaheim Ducks embroidered Salei's number (#24) on their jerseys for the season. The New Jersey Devils wore a commemorative patch on their jerseys honoring former Devils players Karel Rachůnek and Alexander Vasyunov. The St. Louis Blues also held a memorial ceremony for former players Pavol Demitra and Igor Korolev before their 8 November game against the Chicago Blackhawks. The Blues players also wore a special '38' sticker on their helmets, as both players wore that number with the Blues. Blues goaltender Jaroslav Halák also had his 2011–12 goaltending mask made with a tribute to his fellow Slovak Demitra on the backplate. In Sweden, over 10,000 relatives and fans of HV71 attended Kinnarps Arena, the team's home arena, to mourn Liv, Lokomotiv's Swedish goaltender.

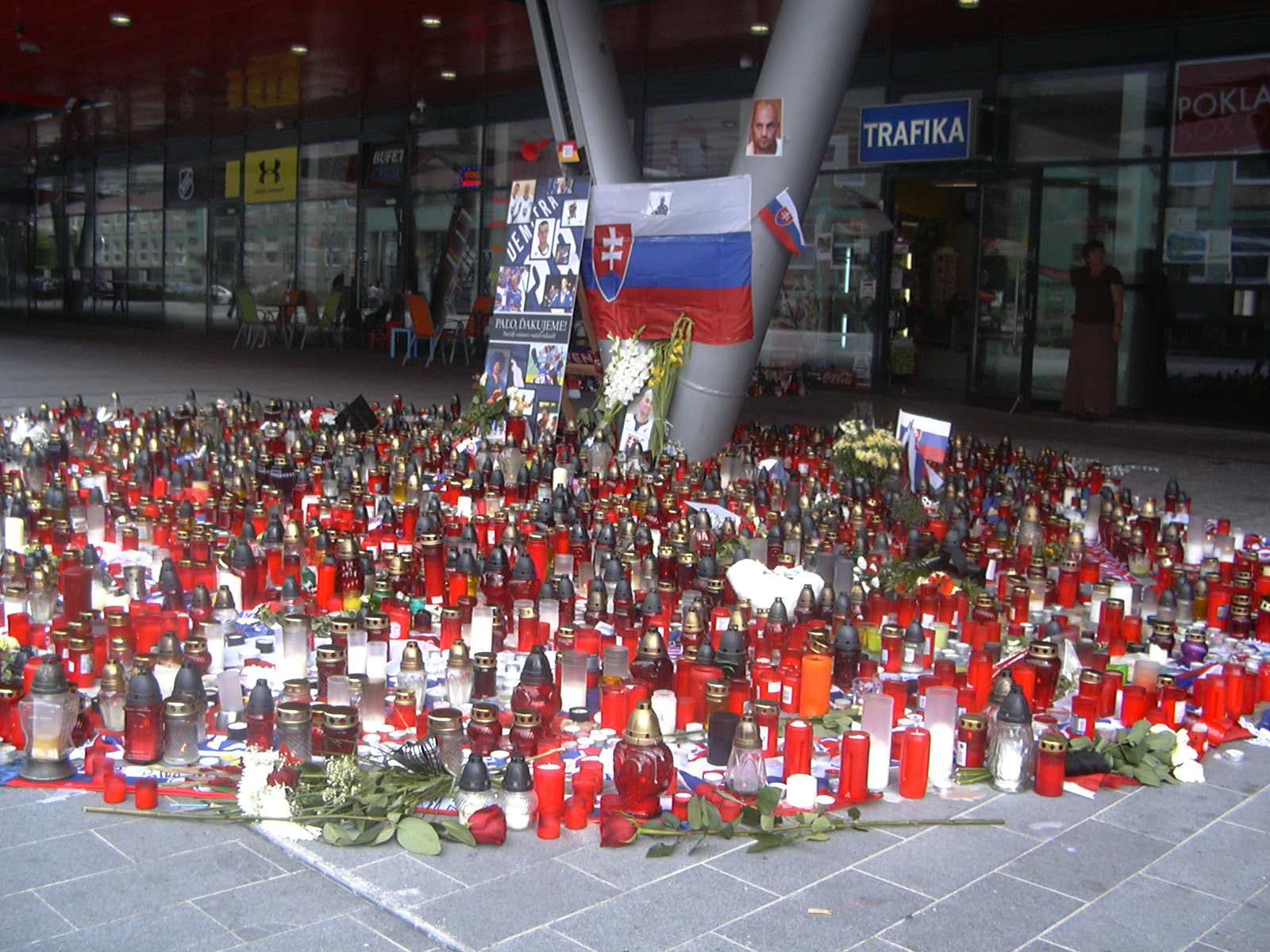
Tributes left by Slovak fans near Ondrej Nepela Arena in Bratislava on 9 September

The Slovak Ice Hockey Federation announced that the jersey number 38 would be retired from the national team in memory of Pavol Demitra, who recently retired from the national team in May on home ice, at the World Championship Slovakia hosted for the first time and who would be the in memoriam inductee of the 2012 Class of Slovak Hockey Hall of Fame. Furthermore, it was announced that Team Slovakia would have a minor number 38 sewn into the jerseys up until 2012 World Championship. Demitra was further honoured by a public ceremony at a hockey stadium in Trenčín, which bears his name since late 2011 (Pavol Demitra Ice Stadium) along with an elementary school attended in Dubnica nad Váhom. Thanks to Demitra's popularity spontaneous gatherings also took place across Slovakia, by hockey stadiums, in his memory.

The German Ice Hockey Federation announced that it would retire the No. 20 jersey of Robert Dietrich on Team Germany. The 13 October 2011 game between the Pittsburgh Penguins and Washington Capitals, which featured Russian ice hockey players Alexander Ovechkin and Evgeni Malkin, was dedicated to Lokomotiv Yaroslavl. The teams wore commemorative Lokomotiv patches. All jerseys were autographed by the players and auctioned to raise funds for the families of those who died in the crash.

On 12 March 2012, the Latvian Ice Hockey Federation announced that it would retire the number 7 jersey of Kārlis Skrastiņš from Team Latvia. On 24 March 2012, the Dallas Stars (for whom Skrastiņš had played prior to signing with Lokomotiv) held a pre-game ceremony with Skrastiņš' family and announced a trust fund for Skrastiņš' children. Similarly, the Czech Ice Hockey Association decided to retire Czech Republic men's national ice hockey team jersey numbers in honor of its three late players. The numbers 4 of Karel Rachunek, 15 of Jan Marek, and 63 of Josef Vasicek have since been taken out of circulation.

On 16 December 2011, the jersey of Stefan Liv was raised to the roof of Husqvarna Garden. His number one was retired and would never be used again by a HV71 player.

== Aftermath ==
Following the tragedy, Lokomotiv chose to cancel their participation in the 2011–12 KHL season. The club instead participated in the 2011–12 season of the Russian Major League (VHL), the second-highest ice hockey league in Russia after the KHL, starting in December 2011, and were eligible for the VHL playoffs. The KHL temporarily suspended its season-opening game already in progress and postponed the start of the season by five days.

On 11 September 2011, President Medvedev ordered the grounding of all airlines "which are not adequately able to ensure passengers' safety". A deadline of 15 November 2011 was set to put into place "measures be developed to stop Russian air carriers' activities if they are not able to provide safe flights". Measures to bring aircraft up to international standards were to be sped up and the installation of new radio beacons to the latest COSPAS-SARSAT standard. Russian aviation authorities suspended all flights with the Yak-42 pending checks of other existing aircraft of the same type. On 21 September 2011, Yak-Service had its operating licence revoked by Rosaviatsiya after an audit of flight operations of the airline and as a result of the crash.

== Investigation and trial ==
The Interstate Aviation Committee (MAK) opened an investigation into the circumstances of the accident. The aircraft's flight data recorders were recovered the day after the crash. The fuel supply used to refuel the aircraft was quarantined, and samples were taken for analysis. The results were that the fuel in the storage tanks at Tunoshna Airport met the specified requirements for aviation fuel.

Preliminary analysis of the flight recorders indicated that the aircraft's trimmable horizontal stabilizer was set to 8.7 degrees "nose up" and its wing flaps were in the take-off position of 20 degrees. The engines were functioning until the impact with the beacon mast.

The Technical Commission of the MAK released further findings on 12 September 2011:

- the engines continued working until the crash.
- the weather was ruled out as a factor.
- the crew carried out a check of all flight controls of the aircraft, including the elevator. The flight control surfaces responded as intended.
- take-off weight was less than the maximum allowable for take-off. (Note: No weight scales were available at the airport to assess the actual baggage weight. Therefore, the Charter Airline estimated the total gross weight of the aircraft, which they determined was well under the limit. However, following the complete investigation, it was determined that the aircraft was actually overweight. This was a key factor for the excessive takeoff roll.)
- the aircraft had 14 tons of fuel on board, of which eight tons was from the airport in Yaroslavl.
- prior to the takeoff, the stabilizer and flaps were set to takeoff position.

The committee referred the study of the flight recorders and operational data to other research centers. The Technical Commission established contacts with the investigation authorities of the countries whose citizens were on board: Czech Republic, Germany, Slovakia, Sweden, Latvia and Canada.

On 14 September 2011, a report in the newspaper Moskovsky Komsomolets, quoting a source in the aviation industry, claimed that the parking brake of the aircraft was on during take-off, which significantly slowed it down and prevented it from accelerating properly. According to this theory, the captain had turned over control to the co-pilot before take-off, as he was not feeling well. As it is the captain's duty to release the brake, the co-pilot may not have been aware that it had not been done, or had forgotten to do so. LifeNews reported that investigators were investigating the pilots' professional history and that the pilots did not have sufficient experience on the Yak-42.

RIA Novosti reported that Deputy Minister Okulov and Federal Air Transport Agency head Alexander Neradko both dismissed the theory in discussions with reporters at a press conference on 14 September 2011. The theory was also discounted by Konstantin Malinin, a former test pilot of the Yak-42, who noted that an engaged parking brake would have left skid marks and pieces of rubber on the runway, and there were none found.

Two simulations of the crash were planned to help determine the cause. A "virtual" simulation used flight simulators. The data from the crashed Yak-42's flight recorders was loaded into a simulator, which then reconstructed the crash. A "live" simulation attempted to duplicate conditions of the crash, using a similar Yak-42, which launched from Zhukovsky Airfield. The Gromov Flight Research Institute conducted the tests. The Institute previously assisted the IAC in the investigation of the crash in 2010 that killed the president of Poland, Lech Kaczyński.

On 17 September 2011, the MAK released further information about its investigation. It found the aircraft had started its takeoff with approximately 2,700 metres (8,900 ft) of usable runway length from its starting position. The aircraft started rolling down the runway with engines at nominal thrust, with takeoff thrust not being applied until six seconds later. Despite the increase of thrust the aircraft did not accelerate as expected. The committee report speculated that this could have been due to some braking force, and the committee stated it would send the braking system components to a "specialized institution" for a special examination. The aircraft reached a maximum speed of 230 kilometres per hour (120 kn; 140 mph). It did not lift off the ground until some 400 metres (1,300 ft) after the end of the runway, but at no point did it rise more than 5–6 metres (16–20 ft) off the ground. It then hit the airport beacon, deflected to the left and impacted the ground. The flaps and slats were in takeoff position, spoilers retracted, and the stabilizer set in a ten-degree position. The elevator controls were still connected.

On 19 September 2011, news channel Rossiya 24 published the last minute of dialog between the flight crew, from the voice recorder:

Captain: 74, 76.
Flight engineer: 74, 76.
Captain: Time, headlights. We are taking off, top speed 190.
Captain: Three, four, five, nominal [engine thrust].
Flight engineer: Nominal [thrust] on.
Flight engineer: Speed is increasing. [Flight] parameters [are] normal. 130, 150, 170, 190, 210.
Captain: [Switch to] takeoff [thrust].
Flight engineer: 220, 230.
Co-pilot: Maybe [it's] the stabilizer.
Captain: Takeoff, takeoff [thrust]! Stabilizer!
Co-pilot: What are you doing?
Captain: Takeoff [thrust]!
Co-pilot: Fuck you!
[Sound of alarm]
[Sound of first impact]
Flight engineer: Takeoff [thrust] on.
Captain: Fuck!
Co-pilot: Andrey!
Captain: This is it!
[Sound of second impact]
End of recording

According to test pilot Anatoly Knishov, in an interview with Komsomolskaya Pravda, top speed 190 represents a decision point where, if failures occur before that speed, the aircraft is able to stop on the runway. At 210, the captain switched the engines to "takeoff mode" from "regular flight mode" or "nominal mode". According to Knishov, a nominal thrust/power mode is used for an empty aircraft, while all loaded aircraft use a takeoff mode. In his opinion, the switch-over from a nominal- to takeoff mode was late and unusual, as engine mode for taking off is normally agreed upon before starting a take-off run.

Life News reported on 20 September 2011 the opinion of test pilot Magomed Tolboev. According to Tolboev, the cause of the disaster might have been a disagreement between the aircraft commander and the copilot. From examining a 100-metre-long (330 ft) skid mark on the runway, Tolboev suggested that one of them tried to brake, while the other was trying to take off. Tolboev also considered the Yak-42 not as advanced in its build and materials as contemporary Western models, heavier and less fuel-efficient, but still a "reliable vehicle" with "best rigidity".

On 23 September 2011, Kyiv Post reported that the only survivor of the crash, flight mechanic Sizov, was questioned by the investigative committee on 22 September 2011. According to Sizov, no problems were noted in the preparation for the flight, and the aircraft had no problems during its previous flight. Sizov also described the distribution of the passengers and luggage on the aircraft: Lokomotiv's coaches were in the front cabin; the players were in the rear cabin; and the luggage was carried in the rear luggage compartment. Kyiv Post also reported that a criminal investigation under Article 263 of the Criminal Code (flight safety violations causing two or more deaths) had commenced.

On 10 October 2011, the Gromov Institute began its series of test flights. The simulations applied braking forces at different stages of the takeoff to determine what effects, if any, the forces had on the ability of the aircraft to reach a take-off angle and speed. The first flight created a baseline takeoff, without any braking force applied.

Simulation testing determined that pilot error was the cause as a braking force was found to have been applied by the chief pilot during takeoff. Using data from the flight recorder, it was determined the movement was only possible by pushing down on the brake pedals from the chief pilot's seat to push upwards on the control column. The investigating committee found evidence of the braking failure in the braking system.

MAK's final report on the accident

The committee released its final report on 2 November 2011. The committee found several problems that led to the crash. The first was that Yak-Service "did not properly control the quality of mastering the aircraft", finding that the crew did not train long enough on the Yak-42. The second was that the crew "did not calculate the takeoff parameters", changing the takeoff thrust during takeoff. While it was not determined which pilot applied the brakes, it was determined that one applied acceleration at the same time as the other applied braking. The co-pilot Zhivelov was found to have the banned drug phenobarbital in his system.

According to Alexei Morozov, chief of the investigative commission, "the immediate cause of the ... crash was the ... crew's erroneous actions, namely the pilot stepping on the brake pedals before raising the nose wheel because of the wrong position of [his] feet on the [pedals] during takeoff."

Federal investigators revealed in September 2012, that the pilot and co-pilot had falsified documents stating that they had undergone the necessary training for the Yak-42. According to the documentary television program Mayday!, the investigators also found that the first officer, who was in charge of this flight, had a neurological condition in his feet, and should not have been medically cleared to fly. He may not have felt his feet touching the pedals, which were also different than the pedals he had trained on in the Yak-40. When the plane finally cleared the runway, the brake pressure eased and the plane lifted off. The plane pitched up because of the adjustments made trying to lift off. At that point, a further error was made by the flight engineer, temporarily shutting off thrust in an attempt to level off the plane. However, this was a mistake as the plane needed maximum thrust at that time and it struck the tower, damaging the left side wing, pitching it out of control. The pilots also did not know the abort speed of the plane, and attempted takeoff when they should have aborted. The crew's actions, while in error, were found to be consistent with the lack of training and poor safety procedures at Yak-Service.

Vadim Timofeyev, deputy head of airline Yak-Service, was charged with breaching air safety rules. His trial lasted from December 2014 until September 2015. He pled not guilty, blaming the crash on poorly placed cargo, but was found guilty on 23 September 2015 of violating Part 3 of Article 263 of the Russian Criminal Code, governing the safe operation of aircraft resulting in the manslaughter of more than two people. He was sentenced to five years in prison; however, he was amnestied without serving the full term.

== In popular culture ==
The Lokomotiv Yaroslavl plane crash was featured in "Lokomotiv Hockey Team Disaster", a Season 12 (2012–13) episode of the Canadian TV series Mayday! (called Air Emergency and Air Disasters in the United States and Air Crash Investigation in the UK and elsewhere around the world). The episode was broadcast with the title "Hockey Team Tragedy" in the U.S. and "Russia's Ice Hockey Disaster" in the United Kingdom.

== See also ==
- List of accidents involving sports teams
- List of aviation accidents and incidents with a sole survivor
