= Pavel Trakhanov =

Russian ice hockey player

- Born: 21 March 1978; Moscow, Soviet Union
- Died: 7 September 2011 (aged 33); Tunoshna, Yaroslavl, Russia
- Height: 5 ft 11 in (180 cm)
- Weight: 181 lb (82 kg; 12 st 13 lb)
- Position: Defence
- Shot: Left
- Played for: HC CSKA Moscow (RSL); Severstal Cherepovets (RSL); HC MVD (RSL)/(KHL); Atlant Moscow Oblast (KHL); Lokomotiv Yaroslavl (KHL)
- NHL draft: Undrafted
- Playing career: 1995–2011

Pavel Sergeyevich Trakhanov (Russian: Павел Серге́евич Траханов) (21 March 1978 – 7 September 2011) was a Russian professional ice hockey defenceman who played for Lokomotiv Yaroslavl of the Kontinental Hockey League (KHL).

== Death ==
On 7 September 2011, Trakhanov was killed in the 2011 Lokomotiv Yaroslavl plane crash, when a Yakovlev Yak-42 passenger aircraft, carrying nearly the entire Lokomotiv team, crashed just outside Yaroslavl, Russia. The team was traveling to Minsk, Belarus to play their opening game of the season, with its coaching staff and prospects. Lokomotiv officials said "'everyone from the main roster was on the plane plus four players from the youth team.'"

== See also ==
- List of ice hockey players who died during their playing career
