= YAK-Service =

Russian charter airline

| IATA | ICAO | Call sign |
|---|---|---|
| - | AKY | YAK SERVICE |
- Founded: 12 February 1993
- Commenced operations: 25 November 1993
- Ceased operations: 21 September 2011
- Headquarters: Moscow, Russia

YAK-Service (Russian: ЗАО «Авиационная компания «Як-Сервис») was an airline that operated executive passenger charters based in Moscow, Russia. It was established on 12 February 1993 and started operations on 25 November 1993. The airline was banned from operating within the EU from 24 July 2009 to November 2009, and had further restrictions imposed upon it in 2010.

On 21 September 2011, the airline had its licence revoked by Rosaviatsiya in the wake of the 2011 Lokomotiv Yaroslavl plane crash in Yaroslavl, Russia.

== Fleet ==
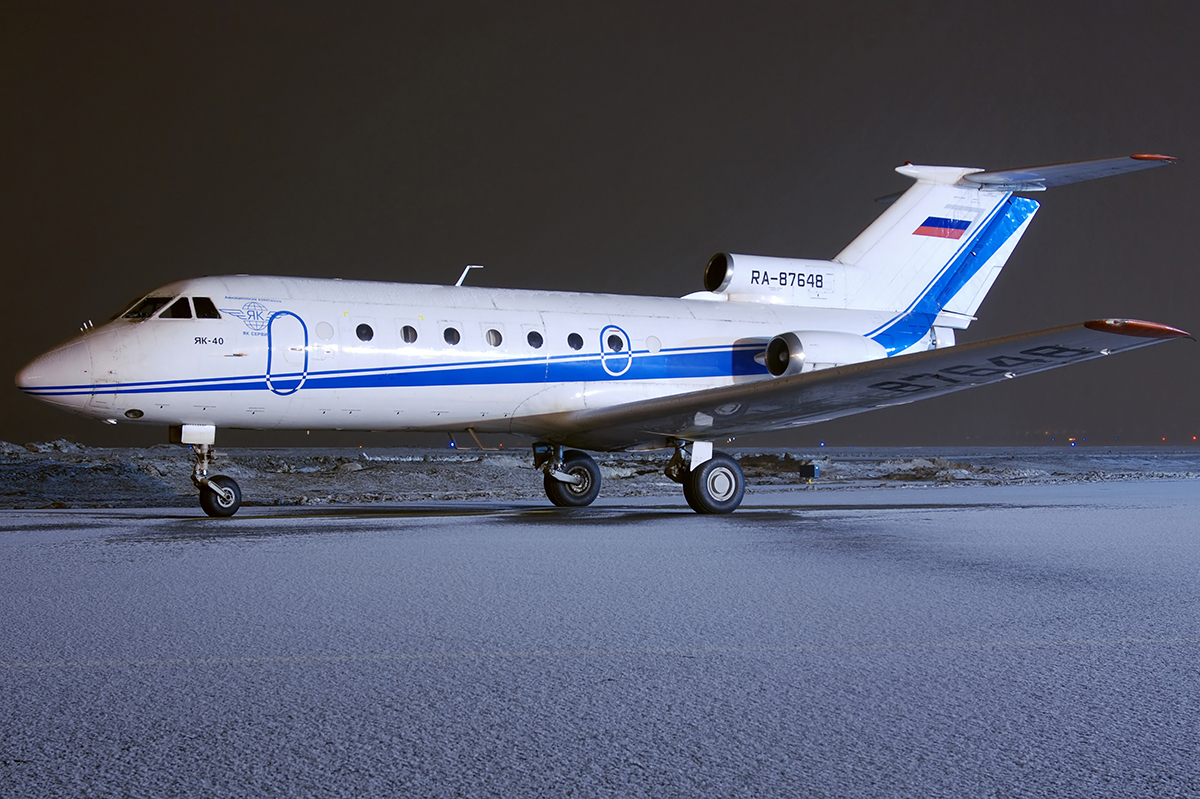
YAK-Service YAK-40

The YAK-Service fleet consisted of the following aircraft:

- 3 Yakovlev Yak-40
- 1 Yakovlev Yak-42, RA-42387

== Accident ==
On 7 September 2011, at 16:05 MSK, RA-42434 Yak-42D, chartered to carry the Lokomotiv Yaroslavl KHL hockey team, crashed at the Volga River bank 2 kilometers from Tunoshna Airport, Yaroslavl, Russia, and was destroyed, killing the entire team and 3 crew members, one crew member aboard survived. Among the deceased in this crash were former National Hockey League (NHL) players Pavol Demitra, Ruslan Salei, and Kārlis Skrastiņš.

== See also ==
- List of defunct airlines of Russia

== Sources ==
- YAK-Service on Aviation Safety Network
- EUR-Lex, "Commission Regulation (EC) No 1144/2009"; EU Commission Banning Yak Service (See note 108)
