= Alexander Vasyunov =

Russian ice hockey player (1988–2011)

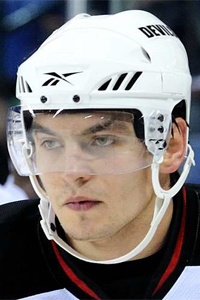
- Born: April 22, 1988 Yaroslavl, Soviet Union
- Died: September 7, 2011 (aged 23) Yaroslavl, Russia
- Height: 6 ft 0 in (183 cm)
- Weight: 189 lb (86 kg; 13 st 7 lb)
- Position: Left wing
- Shot: Right
- Played for: Lokomotiv Yaroslavl; New Jersey Devils
- NHL draft: 58th overall, 2006; New Jersey Devils
- Playing career: 2004–2011

Alexander Sergeevich Vasyunov (Russian: Алекса́ндр Серге́евич Васю́нов; April 22, 1988 – September 7, 2011) was a Russian ice hockey player who played for Lokomotiv Yaroslavl in the Kontinental Hockey League. Alexander Vasyunov was a prospect for the New Jersey Devils in the NHL. He was drafted in the second round, 58th overall in the 2006 NHL entry draft. Vasyunov died in the 2011 Lokomotiv Yaroslavl plane crash, along with his entire Lokomotiv team, just outside Yaroslavl, Russia. The team was on its way to Minsk, Belarus, to play their 2011–12 season opener with the entire team, coaching staff, and prospects.

== Playing career ==
Vasyunov was selected in the second round, 58th overall, of the 2006 NHL entry draft by the New Jersey Devils. He remained with his Russian team until the 2008–09 season, when he moved to the American Hockey League, playing in Albany, New York. In his third season in the AHL, he was called up to play for the Devils, initially for only one game in October 2010, to fill in for Ilya Kovalchuk. He returned to Albany after that game, but was called back up to join the Devils twice more during the 2010–11 season.

Vasyunov scored his first NHL goal on November 12, 2010, against Devan Dubnyk of the Edmonton Oilers. He re-joined Lokomotiv Yaroslavl on June 27, 2011, signing a one–year contract with the team.

Vasyunov was killed on September 7, 2011, in the Lokomotiv Yaroslavl plane crash. A Yakovlev Yak-42 passenger aircraft carrying nearly his entire Lokomotiv team crashed on takeoff, just outside Yaroslavl, Russia. The team was traveling to Minsk to play their opening game of the season, with its coaching staff and prospects. Lokomotiv officials said "'everyone from the main roster was on the plane plus four players from the youth team.'"

== Career statistics ==
=== Regular season and playoffs ===
			Regular season					Playoffs
Season	Team	League	GP	G	A	Pts	PIM	GP	G	A	Pts	PIM
2004–05	Lokomotiv–2 Yaroslavl	RUS.3	32	9	2	11	8	—	—	—	—	—
2005–06	Lokomotiv Yaroslavl	RSL	2	0	0	0	2	—	—	—	—	—
2005–06	Lokomotiv–2 Yaroslavl	RUS.3	29	29	6	35	18	—	—	—	—	—
2006–07	Lokomotiv Yaroslavl	RSL	17	0	0	0	4	—	—	—	—	—
2006–07	Lokomotiv–2 Yaroslavl	RUS.3	34	17	9	26	56	—	—	—	—	—
2007–08	Lokomotiv Yaroslavl	RSL	22	4	0	4	4	16	2	0	2	2
2007–08	Lokomotiv–2 Yaroslavl	RUS.3	2	1	1	2	0	—	—	—	—	—
2008–09	Lokomotiv Yaroslavl	KHL	2	0	0	0	0	—	—	—	—	—
2008–09	Lokomotiv–2 Yaroslavl	RUS.3	2	2	0	2	2	—	—	—	—	—
2008–09	Lowell Devils	AHL	69	15	13	28	12	—	—	—	—	—
2009–10	Lowell Devils	AHL	68	16	22	38	10	5	2	2	4	0
2010–11	Albany Devils	AHL	50	8	17	25	11	—	—	—	—	—
2010–11	New Jersey Devils	NHL	18	1	4	5	0	—	—	—	—	—
RSL totals			41	4	0	4	10	16	2	0	2	2
AHL totals			187	39	52	91	33	5	2	2	4	0
NHL totals			18	1	4	5	0	—	—	—	—	—

=== International ===
Medal record

Representing Russia

Ice hockey

World Junior Championships
Silver medal – second place	2007 Sweden	

Year	Team	Event	Result	GP	G	A	Pts	PIM
2005	Russia	U18	4th	5	3	1	4	2
2006	Russia	WJC18	5th	6	2	2	4	6
2007	Russia	WJC	2nd place, silver medalist(s)	6	2	0	2	2
Junior totals				17	7	3	10	10

== See also ==
- List of ice hockey players who died during their playing career
