= Yuri Yakovlev (ice hockey) =

Russian ice hockey president (born 1957)

Yuri Yakovlev (born 22 November 1957) is the president of Lokomotiv Yaroslavl, a Russian professional ice hockey team playing in the Kontinental Hockey League (KHL).
