= Igor Korolev =

Russian-Canadian ice hockey player and coach (1970–2011)

- Born: September 6, 1970 Zelenograd, Russian SFSR, Soviet Union
- Died: September 7, 2011 (aged 41) Yaroslavl, Russia
- Height: 6 ft 1 in (185 cm)
- Weight: 198 lb (90 kg; 14 st 2 lb)
- Position: Centre
- Shot: Left
- Played for: HC Dynamo Moscow; St. Louis Blues; Winnipeg Jets; Phoenix Coyotes; Toronto Maple Leafs; Chicago Blackhawks; Metallurg Magnitogorsk; Atlant Moscow Oblast; Lokomotiv Yaroslavl
- National team: Soviet Union and Russia
- NHL draft: 38th overall, 1992; St. Louis Blues
- Playing career: 1988–2010

Igor Borisovich Korolev (Russian: Игорь Борисович Королёв; September 6, 1970 – September 7, 2011) was a Russian-Canadian professional ice hockey player and coach. Korolev played over 700 games in the National Hockey League (NHL) from 1992 until 2004. Korolev returned to Russia, and played a further seven seasons in the Russian Super League (RSL) and the Kontinental Hockey League (KHL) before retiring from active play in 2010. In 2011, Korolev accepted an assistant coach position with Lokomotiv Yaroslavl of the KHL. Korolev was killed in the 2011 Lokomotiv Yaroslavl plane crash along with nearly the entire roster of Lokomotiv Yaroslavl. A native of the Russian Republic of the Soviet Union, Korolev became a naturalized Canadian citizen in 2000.

== Playing career ==
Korolev began his professional playing career with HC Dynamo Moscow in the 1988–89 season appearing once. The following season, Korolev became a full member of the team, playing 17 games. He played two further full seasons with Dynamo. In all three seasons, Dynamo won the league championship. Korolev was drafted by the St. Louis Blues in the second round, 38th overall in the 1992 NHL entry draft. After five games with Dynamo in the 1992–93 season, Korolev left to join the Blues. Korolev played for the Blues for two seasons. Korolev was unsigned in the 1994–95 season and he returned to Dynamo. He was picked up by the Winnipeg Jets in the waiver draft in January 1995 and stayed with the team as it moved to Phoenix. He signed as a free agent with Toronto in 1997. He was traded to Chicago in 2001 where he played until 2004. He then returned to Russia and signed with Lokomotiv Yaroslavl. After one season, he transferred to Metallurg Magnitogorsk, where he played three seasons. He played one season with Atlant Moscow Oblast and one final season with Lokomotiv Yaroslavl where he retired after the 2009–10 season. He became an assistant coach with the team and was still an assistant at the time of his death.

== Death ==
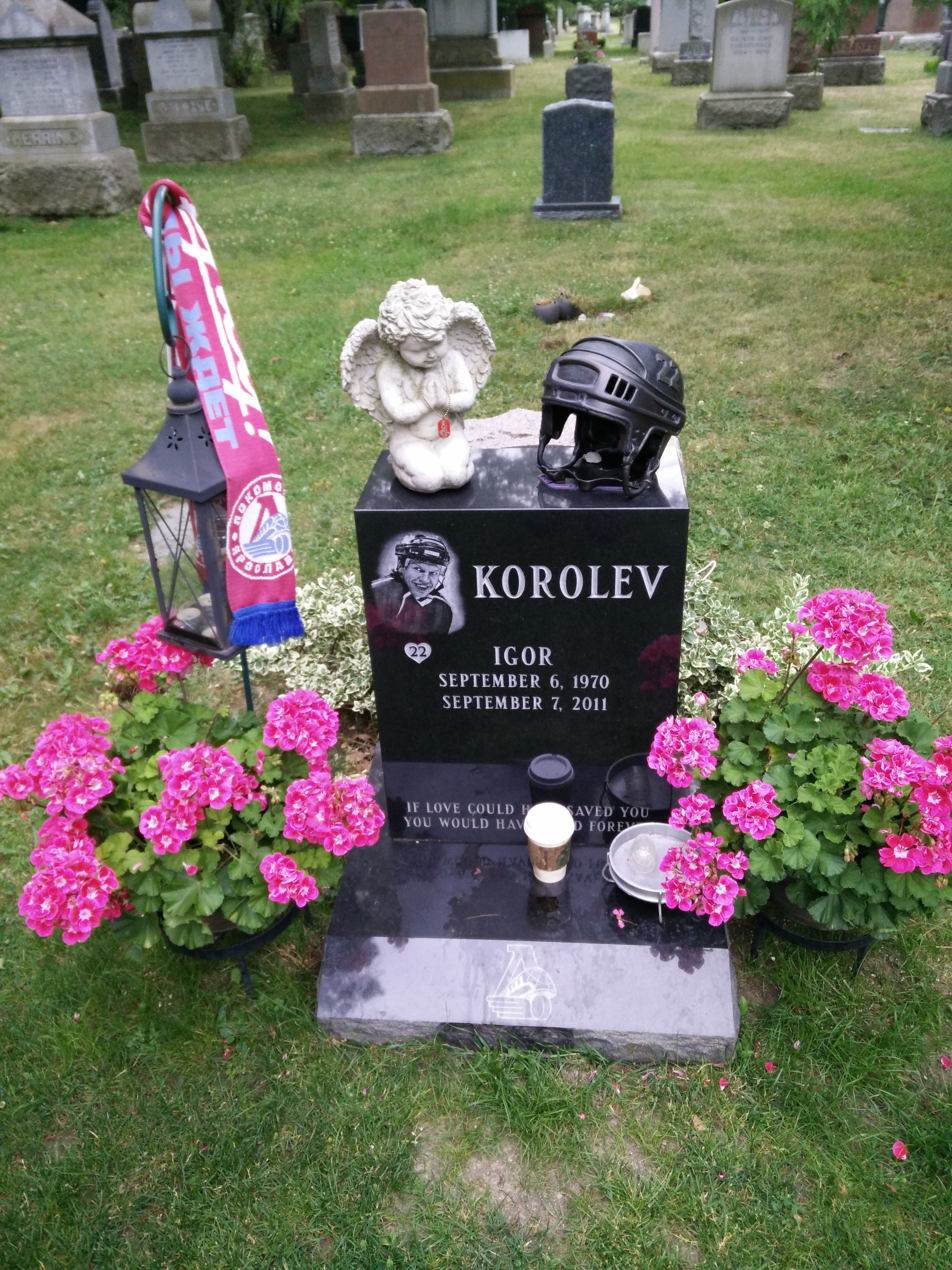
Grave of Igor Korolev in Mount Pleasant cemetery, Toronto, decorated with flowers and memorabilia

Korolev died on September 7, 2011, the day after he turned 41, when a Yakovlev Yak-42 passenger aircraft crashed just outside Yaroslavl, Russia while transporting Lokomotiv to Minsk to play their opening game of the season. Lokomotiv officials said "everyone from the main roster was on the plane plus four players from the youth team." All aboard were killed, aside from one crew member.

== Personal ==
Igor and Vera Korolev married in June 1990. Igor and Vera have two daughters, Kristina and Anastasia. Korolev's family has a permanent home in the North York district of Toronto, Ontario, Canada. The Korolevs obtained Canadian citizenship in 2000. Korolev was buried in Toronto at Mount Pleasant Cemetery after a funeral on September 18, 2011. Korolev was the godfather of fellow NHL player Nik Antropov's son. Korolev and Antropov both played the 2000–01 season with the Toronto Maple Leafs.

== Honors ==
- Soviet championship: 1990 (with Dynamo)
- Soviet championship: 1991 (with Dynamo)
- Championship of SNG: 1992 (with Dynamo)
- International Hockey League: 1993 (with Dynamo)
- International Hockey League: 1995 (with Dynamo)
- Russian Super League: 2007 (with Metallurg Magnitogorsk)

== Career statistics ==
=== Regular season and playoffs ===
			Regular season					Playoffs
Season	Team	League	GP	G	A	Pts	PIM	GP	G	A	Pts	PIM
1988–89	MCOP Moscow	URS.3	14	3	4	7	16	—	—	—	—	—
1988–89	Dynamo Moscow	URS	1	0	0	0	2	—	—	—	—	—
1989–90	Dynamo Moscow	URS	17	3	2	5	2	—	—	—	—	—
1989–90	Dynamo–2 Moscow	URS.3	12	1	3	4	25	—	—	—	—	—
1990–91	Dynamo Moscow	URS	38	12	4	16	12	—	—	—	—	—
1990–91	Dynamo–2 Moscow	URS.3	3	2	3	5	4	—	—	—	—	—
1991–92	Dynamo Moscow	CIS	33	12	8	20	10	7	2	5	7	6
1991–92	Dynamo–2 Moscow	CIS.3	4	6	4	10	0	—	—	—	—	—
1992–93	Dynamo Moscow	RUS	5	1	2	3	4	—	—	—	—	—
1992–93	St. Louis Blues	NHL	74	4	23	27	20	3	0	0	0	0
1993–94	St. Louis Blues	NHL	73	6	10	16	40	2	0	0	0	0
1994–95	Dynamo Moscow	RUS	13	4	6	10	18	—	—	—	—	—
1994–95	Winnipeg Jets	NHL	45	8	22	30	10	—	—	—	—	—
1995–96	Winnipeg Jets	NHL	73	22	29	51	42	6	0	3	3	0
1996–97	Phoenix Coyotes	NHL	41	3	7	10	28	1	0	0	0	0
1996–97	Michigan K–Wings	IHL	4	2	2	4	0	—	—	—	—	—
1996–97	Phoenix Roadrunners	IHL	4	2	6	8	4	—	—	—	—	—
1997–98	Toronto Maple Leafs	NHL	78	17	22	39	22	—	—	—	—	—
1998–99	Toronto Maple Leafs	NHL	66	13	34	47	46	1	0	0	0	0
1999–2000	Toronto Maple Leafs	NHL	80	20	26	46	22	12	0	4	4	6
2000–01	Toronto Maple Leafs	NHL	73	10	19	29	28	11	0	0	0	0
2001–02	Chicago Blackhawks	NHL	82	9	20	29	20	5	0	1	1	0
2002–03	Chicago Blackhawks	NHL	48	4	5	9	30	—	—	—	—	—
2002–03	Norfolk Admirals	AHL	14	4	3	7	0	9	2	4	6	4
2003–04	Norfolk Admirals	AHL	10	1	4	5	4	—	—	—	—	—
2003–04	Chicago Blackhawks	NHL	62	3	10	13	22	—	—	—	—	—
2004–05	Lokomotiv Yaroslavl	RSL	60	8	20	28	26	9	1	6	7	2
2005–06	Metallurg Magnitogorsk	RSL	51	7	17	24	26	11	0	1	1	4
2006–07	Metallurg Magnitogorsk	RSL	54	2	14	16	28	15	4	3	7	8
2007–08	Metallurg Magnitogorsk	RSL	57	6	20	26	58	13	5	5	10	10
2008–09	Atlant Mytishchi	KHL	56	7	15	22	46	7	0	1	1	10
2009–10	Lokomotiv Yaroslavl	KHL	48	5	15	20	28	15	0	3	3	4
URS/CIS totals			89	27	14	41	26	7	2	5	7	6
NHL totals			795	119	227	346	330	41	0	8	8	6
RSL totals			222	23	68	91	140	48	10	15	25	24

=== International ===
Year	Team	Event	Result	GP	G	A	Pts	PIM
1988	Soviet Union	EJC	3rd place, bronze medalist(s)	6	3	2	5	2
1991	Soviet Union	CC	5th	5	0	0	0	0
1992	Russia	WC	5th	6	2	1	3	2
Senior totals				11	2	1	3	2
