= Alexander Vyukhin =

Ukrainian and Russian ice hockey player

- Born: January 9, 1973 Sverdlovsk, Russian SFSR, Soviet Union
- Died: September 7, 2011 (aged 38) Yaroslavl, Russia
- Height: 5 ft 9 in (175 cm)
- Weight: 174 lb (79 kg; 12 st 6 lb)
- Position: Goaltender
- Played for: Sokil Kyiv; Avangard Omsk; Sibir Novosibirsk; Severstal Cherepovets; Metallurg Novokuznetsk; Lokomotiv Yaroslavl
- National team: Ukraine
- NHL draft: Undrafted
- Playing career: 1992–2011

Oleksandr Yevhenovych "Alexander" Vyukhin (Ukrainian: Олександр Євгенович Вьюхін; January 9, 1973 – September 7, 2011) was a Ukrainian and Russian professional ice hockey goaltender who last played for Lokomotiv Yaroslavl of the Kontinental Hockey League (KHL). He died in the 2011 Lokomotiv Yaroslavl plane crash outside of Yaroslavl, Russia.

== Playing career ==
Vyukhin moved from Sverdlovsk (now Yekaterinburg) to Ukraine as a junior where he would play in both Kharkiv and Kiev. He began his professional career in 1992 with Sokil Kyiv, then in the Russian Superleague. He played 19 seasons in Russia, with Avangard Omsk, Sibir Novosibirsk, Severstal Cherepovets, and Metallurg Novokuznetsk before being transferred to Lokomotiv Yaroslavl during the 2010–2011 season. Vyukhin represented Ukraine in the 1999 IIHF World Championship and in two C-Pool World Championships. In the late nineties, he acquired Russian citizenship.

== Death ==
On September 7, 2011, Vyukhin died in the 2011 Lokomotiv Yaroslavl plane crash, when a Yakovlev Yak-42 passenger aircraft, carrying nearly his entire Lokomotiv team, crashed just outside Yaroslavl, Russia. The team was traveling to Minsk to play their opening game of the season, with its coaching staff and prospects. Lokomotiv officials said "'everyone from the main roster was on the plane plus four players from the youth team.'" He was buried in Omsk next to the grave of Alexei Cherepanov.

== Honours ==
- 2004
  - Russian Open Championship (with Avangard)
- 2005
  - European Champions cup (with Avangard)
- 2007
  - Turnir Puchkova

== See also ==
- List of ice hockey players who died during their playing career
