= Gagarin Cup =

Kontinental Hockey League trophy

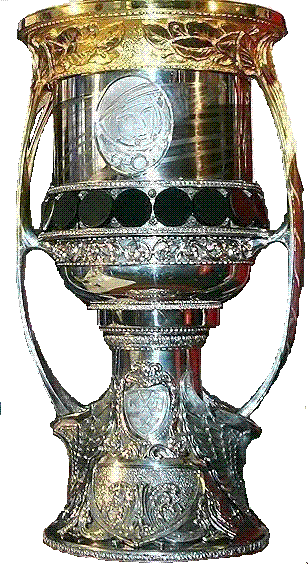
- Sport: Ice hockey
- Competition: KHL playoffs
- Awarded for: Playoff champion of the Kontinental Hockey League

History
- First award: 2008
- First winner: Ak Bars Kazan
- Most wins: Ak Bars Kazan, CSKA Moscow, Metallurg Magnitogorsk (3)
- Most recent: Lokomotiv Yaroslavl (2)

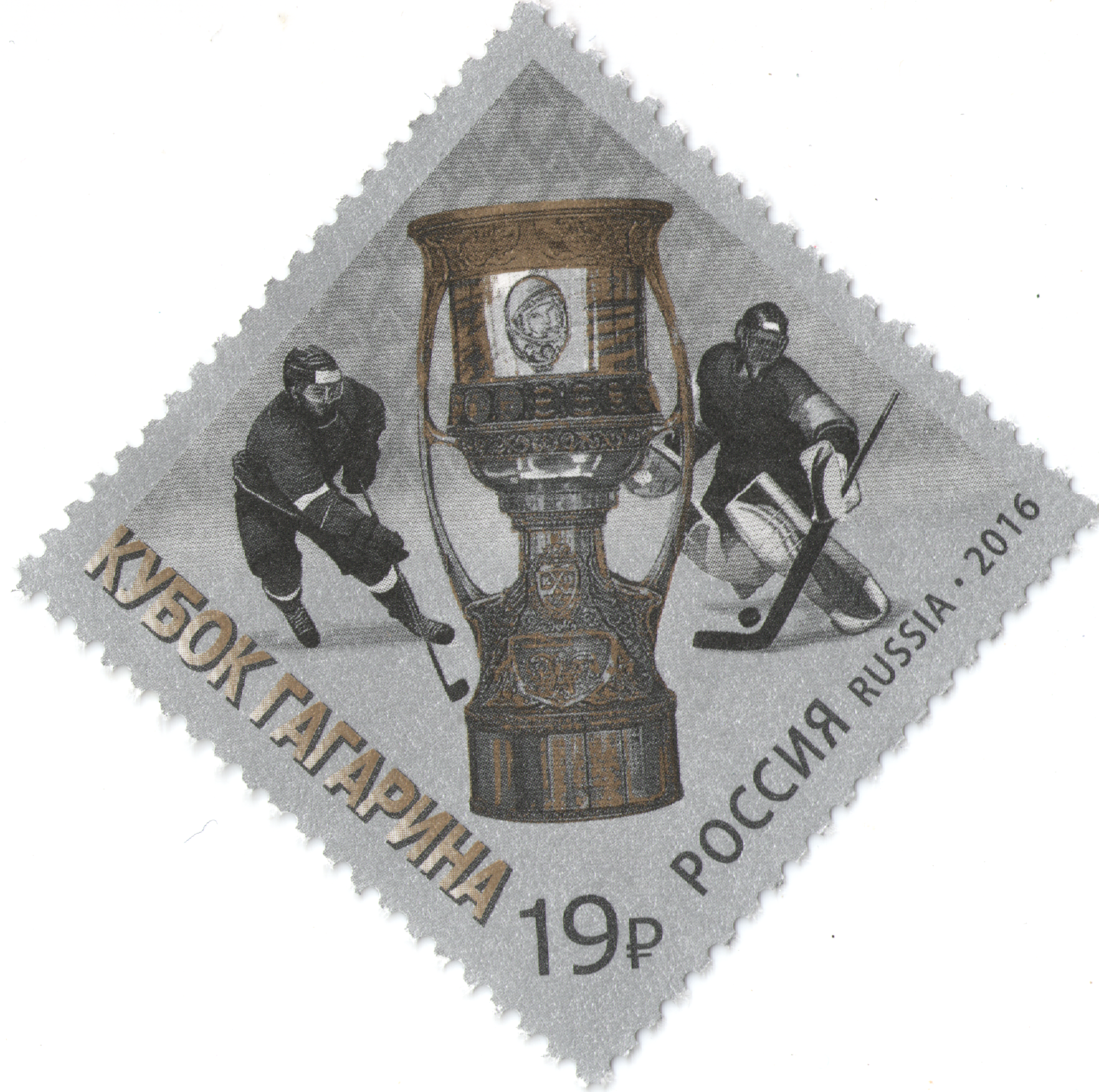
Gagarin Cup on a Russian postage stamp.

The Gagarin Cup (Russian: Кубок Гагарина, romanized: Kubok Gagarina) is the trophy presented to the winner of the Kontinental Hockey League (KHL) playoffs, and is named after Soviet cosmonaut Yuri Gagarin, the first human in space. The Cup was supposedly named after Gagarin because the last possible game of the inaugural KHL season took place on April 12, the anniversary date of Gagarin's flight.

After the end of the KHL's regular season, sixteen teams participate in the playoffs. The round of 16 and quarter-finals were a best-of-five series during the first season, and the semi-finals and finals were a best-of-seven series during the first season. Conferences were established for the second season. Conference quarter-finals are a best-of-five series while the conference semi-finals, conference finals and Gagarin Cup finals are a best-of-seven series. The winner of the final best-of-seven series receives the Gagarin Cup. It has been reported that the Cup weighs 18 kg (40 lbs), making it heavier than the NHL's Stanley Cup.

== Naming history ==
According to league president Alexander Medvedev, the Cup was named after Yuri Gagarin because Russian citizens associate his name with the achievement of great accomplishments, and the man himself has been described as a symbol of the nation.

== Series results ==
Key to colors
	Win for eventual play-off winner
	Loss for eventual play-off winner
W	Western Conference champion
E	Eastern Conference champion
N/A	N/A, KHL conferences established during the second season of competition

Season	Teams		Game scores							Series score	Series-winning goal scorer
Season	Teams		1	2	3	4	5	6	7	Series score	Series-winning goal scorer
2008–09	N/A	Ak Bars Kazan	0–3	4–3 OT			2–3		1–0	4	Alexei Morozov (50:04)
2008–09	N/A	Lokomotiv Yaroslavl			3–0	2–5		2–3 OT		3	Alexei Morozov (50:04)
2009–10	E	Ak Bars Kazan			2–3	1–2		7–1		4	Nikita Alexeev (21:18)
2009–10	W	HC MVD	2–3	1–4			3–2		0–2	3	Nikita Alexeev (21:18)
2010–11	E	Salavat Yulaev Ufa	2–1 OT	3–1			3–2			4	Alexander Svitov (55:48)
2010–11	W	Atlant Moscow Oblast			2–3	4–0				1	Alexander Svitov (55:48)
2011–12	E	Avangard Omsk	2–1	1–2			2–3		0–1	3	Jakub Klepiš (52:03)
2011–12	W	Dynamo Moscow			0–1	1–2 OT		5–2		4	Jakub Klepiš (52:03)
2012–13	E	Traktor Chelyabinsk			3–1	0–1		2–3 OT		2	Alexei Tsvetkov (65:57)
2012–13	W	Dynamo Moscow	2–1	3–2			3–4			4	Alexei Tsvetkov (65:57)
2013–14	E	Metallurg Magnitogorsk	0–3	4–1			2–1 OT		7–4	4	Sergei Mozyakin (43:10)
2013–14	W	Lev Prague			3–2	3–5		5–4 OT		3	Sergei Mozyakin (43:10)
2014–15	E	Ak Bars Kazan	2–4	0–1			1–6			1	Roman Červenka (58:57)
2014–15	W	SKA Saint Petersburg			1–2	3–2				4	Roman Červenka (58:57)
2015–16	E	Metallurg Magnitogorsk			2–3 OT	1–0		2–3 OT		4	Chris Lee (38:57)
2015–16	W	CSKA Moscow	5–1	1–2			1–2 OT		1–3	3	Chris Lee (38:57)
2016–17	E	Metallurg Magnitogorsk	4–5	3–1			3–5			1	Ilya Kovalchuk (40:09)
2016–17	W	SKA Saint Petersburg			2–1 OT	3–2				4	Ilya Kovalchuk (40:09)
2017–18	E	Ak Bars Kazan			2–3 OT	3–1				4	Rob Klinkhammer (41:06)
2017–18	W	CSKA Moscow	1–2	1–2			0–1			1	Rob Klinkhammer (41:06)
2018–19	E	Avangard Omsk			0–2	2–3 OT				0	Maxim Mamin (77:44)
2018–19	W	CSKA Moscow	5–2	3–0						4	Maxim Mamin (77:44)
2019–20	E	–	Cancelled due to the COVID-19 pandemic								
2019–20	W	–	Cancelled due to the COVID-19 pandemic								
2020–21	W	Avangard Omsk			1–2	4–3 OT		1–0		4	Sergey Tolchinsky (19:28)
2020–21	E	CSKA Moscow	1–4	3–0			0–2			2	Sergey Tolchinsky (19:28)
2021–22	E	Metallurg Magnitogorsk	1–3	6–4			2–3		1–4	3	Alexander Popov (09:29)
2021–22	W	CSKA Moscow			0–4	0–1		2–1		4	Alexander Popov (09:29)
2022–23	E	Ak Bars Kazan	4–1	0–3			2–1		2–3	3	Darren Dietz (31:28)
2022–23	W	CSKA Moscow			3–2	2–1		0–3		4	Darren Dietz (31:28)
2023–24	E	Metallurg Magnitogorsk	2–1	1–0						4	Daniil Vovchenko (51:10)
2023–24	W	Lokomotiv Yaroslavl			2–1	2–1				0	Daniil Vovchenko (51:10)
2024–25	E	Traktor Chelyabinsk			2–5	1–3				1	Maxim Shalunov (68:01)
2024–25	W	Lokomotiv Yaroslavl	1–2	4–1			2–1 OT			4	Maxim Shalunov (68:01)
2025–26	E	Ak Bars Kazan			1–4	2–1		2–3		2	Maxim Shalunov (52:30)
2025–26	W	Lokomotiv Yaroslavl	3–1	1–5			4–1			4	Maxim Shalunov (52:30)

== Appearances ==
In the table, the teams are sorted by the number of appearances in the Gagarin Cup finals, then by the number of wins. Italicized marks now non-existent (not playing in the KHL) teams. In the "Years of appearance" column, bold years indicate winning Gagarin Cup Finals appearances.

Team	Apps	Wins	Losses	Win %	Years of appearance (in Gagarin Cup Finals)
CSKA Moscow	6	3	3	.500	2016, 2018, 2019, 2021, 2022, 2023
Ak Bars Kazan	6	3	3	.500	2009, 2010, 2015, 2018, 2023, 2026
Metallurg Magnitogorsk	5	3	2	.600	2014, 2016, 2017, 2022, 2024
Lokomotiv Yaroslavl	4	2	2	.500	2009, 2024, 2025, 2026
Avangard Omsk	3	1	2	.333	2012, 2019, 2021
Dynamo Moscow	2	2	0	1.000	2012, 2013
SKA Saint Petersburg	2	2	0	1.000	2015, 2017
Traktor Chelyabinsk	2	0	2	.000	2013, 2025
Salavat Yulaev Ufa	1	1	0	1.000	2011
HC MVD Moscow Oblast	1	0	1	.000	2010
Atlant Moscow Oblast	1	0	1	.000	2011
Lev Praha	1	0	1	.000	2014
