= Jorma Valtonen =

Finnish ice hockey player

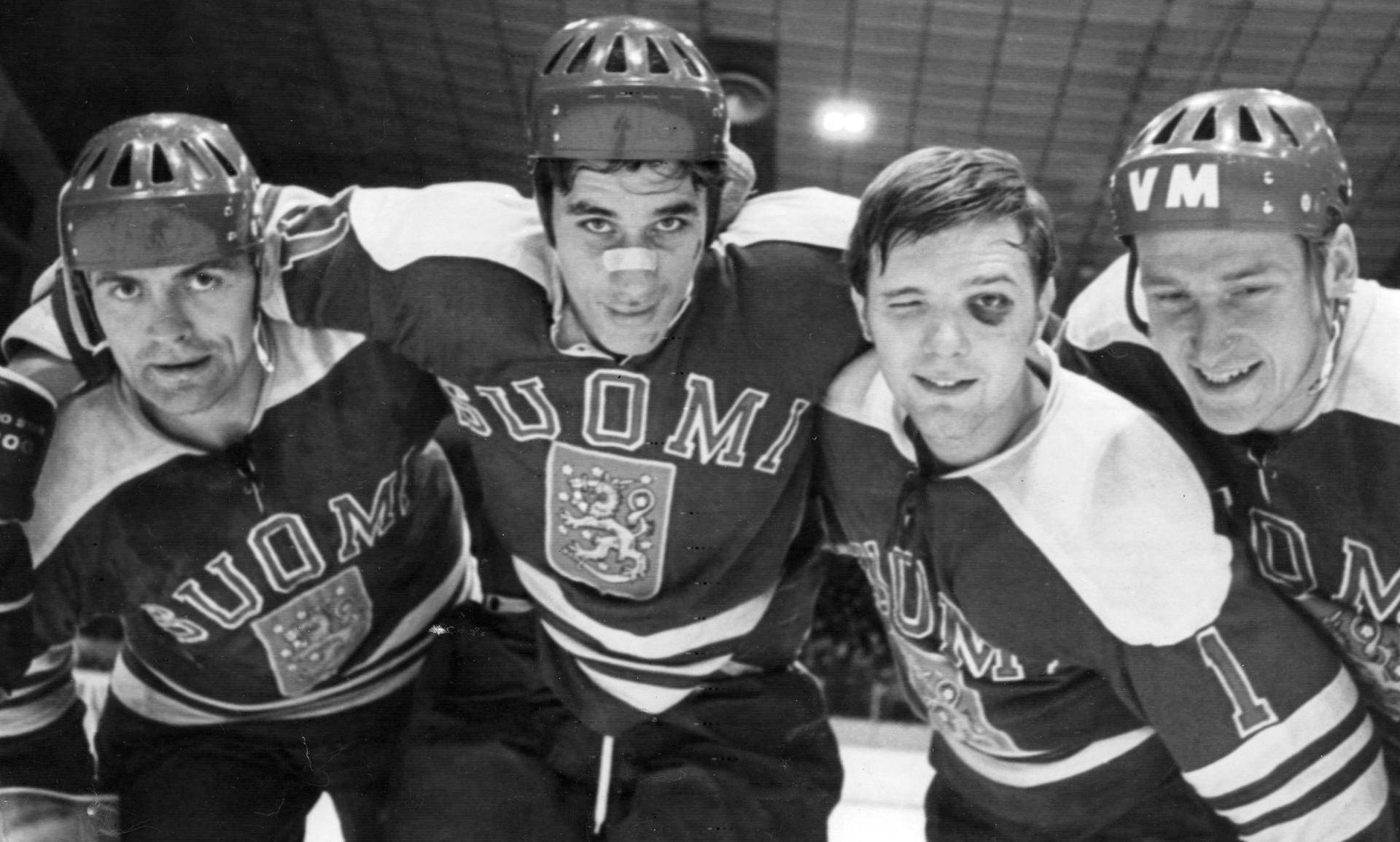
- Jorma Valtonen (second from the right) in 1969
- Born: December 22, 1946 (age 78) Turku, Finland
- Height: 5 ft 9 in (175 cm)
- Weight: 161 lb (73 kg; 11 st 7 lb)
- Position: Goaltender
- Caught: Left
- Played for: TPS; RU-38; Ässät; Jokerit; HC Gherdëina; HC Alleghe; EHC 70 München
- National team: Finland
- Playing career: 1964–1987

Jorma Juhani Valtonen (born 22 December 1946) is a Finnish former professional ice hockey goaltender who played in the SM-liiga. He played on the Finland men's national ice hockey team at the 1980 Winter Olympics, and was inducted into the Finnish Hockey Hall of Fame in 1989, and into the IIHF Hall of Fame in 1999. He later coached the Finland women's national ice hockey team, and was a goaltending coach in the Kontinental Hockey League.

== Career ==
Valtonen was born in Turku, Finland, and played for Jokerit, TPS, RU-38 and Ässät. In Italy, Valtonen played for HC Gherdëina and HC Alleghe. Valtonen took part in the 1972 training camp for the NHL's Toronto Maple Leafs as well as for the Penguins in 1974. In West Germany he played for EHC 70 München on season 1980–81. Valtonen was the goalie for the Finland men's national ice hockey team at the 1980 Winter Olympics. Valtonen has been an Italian league champion and a three-time Finnish league champion.

After retiring, Valtonen became a coach. He was head coach of the Finland women's national ice hockey team and the TPS women's team before becoming the goaltending coach of the Kontinental Hockey League's Lokomotiv Yaroslavl. He was not aboard the flight of the 2011 Lokomotiv Yaroslavl plane crash, when all players from the main roster, four players from the youth team, and eleven staff members perished in that crash, except for main roster player Maxim Zyuzyakin, who was also not aboard the plane. Valtonen was asked to stay behind to work with the junior team.

In 2015, Valtonen returned to Italy to become the goaltending coach of his former team, HC Gherdëina. He currently serves as goaltending coach of Asiago.

== Honors ==
He was inducted into the Finnish Hockey Hall of Fame in 1989, and into the IIHF Hall of Fame in 1999.
