= Maxim Zyuzyakin =

Russian ice hockey player

- Born: 13 January 1991 (age 35) Novokuznetsk, Russian SFSR, Soviet Union
- Height: 5 ft 9 in (175 cm)
- Weight: 154 lb (70 kg; 11 st 0 lb)
- Position: Forward
- Shoots: Right
- FFHG-1 team Former teams: Pingouins de Morzine-Avoriaz; Lokomotiv Yaroslavl; Metallurg Novokuznetsk; Lada Togliatti; HC Khimik Voskresensk
- NHL draft: Undrafted
- Playing career: 2010–present

Maksim Valerevich Zyuzyakin (Russian: Максим Валерьевич Зюзякин) (born 13 January 1991) is a Russian professional ice hockey player for Pingouins de Morzine-Avoriaz of the FFHG Division 1. He has played for various Kontinental Hockey League, Supreme Hockey League, and Junior Hockey League (MHL) teams.

Zyuzyakin was the only rostered member of the team not aboard the 2011 Lokomotiv Yaroslavl plane crash. He had been asked by head coach Brad McCrimmon to stay behind in Yaroslavl to rest and meet with the team in Moscow for their next scheduled game against Spartak, which was never played, as Lokomotiv Yaroslavl cancelled their participation in the 2011–12 KHL season as a result of the crash. Instead Russian hockey coach Petr Vorobiev led the team as it played part of the 2011–12 season in the VHL, the second highest level of Russian hockey. As the only surviving player, Zyuzyakin later was named captain of Lokomotiv Yaroslavl for the 2011–12 VHL season and became a symbol of the team's revival.

In the 2013–14 VHL season he went to the playoffs with Rubin Tyumen. He played with Metallurg Novokuznetsk for part of the 2013–14 KHL season.
