= Josef Vašíček =

Czech ice hockey player (1980–2011)

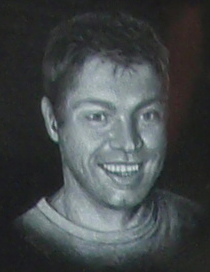
- Born: 12 September 1980 Havlíčkův Brod, Czechoslovakia
- Died: 7 September 2011 (aged 30) Yaroslavl, Russia
- Height: 6 ft 4 in (193 cm)
- Weight: 220 lb (100 kg; 15 st 10 lb)
- Position: Centre
- Shot: Left
- Played for: Carolina Hurricanes; HC Slavia Prague; Nashville Predators; New York Islanders; Lokomotiv Yaroslavl
- National team: Czech Republic
- NHL draft: 91st overall, 1998; Carolina Hurricanes
- Playing career: 2000–2011
Medal record
Representing Czech Republic
Ice hockey
World Championships
Gold medal – first place	2005 Austria
World Junior Championships
Gold medal – first place	2000 Sweden

Josef Vašíček (IPA: [ˈjozɛv ˈvaʃiːtʃɛk]; 12 September 1980 – 7 September 2011) was a Czech professional ice hockey player. Vašíček last played for Lokomotiv Yaroslavl of the Kontinental Hockey League (KHL) and died in the 2011 Lokomotiv Yaroslavl plane crash. He had played seven seasons in the National Hockey League (NHL) for the Carolina Hurricanes, Nashville Predators and New York Islanders before moving to Russia in 2008 to play for Yaroslavl.

== Playing career ==
=== Amateur ===
Vašíček played with Slavia Prague's under-17 team in 1996–97, recording 20 goals and 60 points in 37 games. In 1997–98, he moved up to the Prague's junior team, where he had 13 goals and 33 points in 34 games. He was then drafted by the NHL's Carolina Hurricanes in the fourth round, 91st overall, at the 1998 NHL entry draft.

After his draft, Vašíček made the move to North America to join the Sault Ste. Marie Greyhounds of the Ontario Hockey League (OHL). In the 1998–99 season, he scored 21 goals and 56 points in 66 games, helping the team to the playoffs, where in five post-season games, he scored three goals.

Vašíček returned to the Greyhounds for the 1999–2000 season, where he improved his offensive numbers to 26 goals and 72 points in 54 games to finished second in team scoring. In the playoffs, Vašíček had five goals and a team-high 20 points in 17 games. He was named to the OHL Third All-Star Team after the season.

=== Professional ===
After a solid training camp in September 2000, Vašíček made the Hurricanes' NHL roster and ultimately spent the entire 2000–01 season with the team. He played in his first NHL game on October 7, 2000, earning no points in a 3–3 tie against the Washington Capitals. He then scored his first career NHL goal on October 13 after he beat goaltender Trevor Kidd of the Florida Panthers in an eventual 2–2 tie. Vašíček finished his rookie season with eight goals and 21 points in 76 games. He then played in his first-ever Stanley Cup playoff game on April 12, 2001, scoring a goal against Martin Brodeur of the New Jersey Devils in a 5–1 loss. In six playoff games, Vašíček had two goals.

Vašíček improved offensively in 2001–02 — in 78 games, he scored 14 goals and 31 points to finished seventh in Hurricanes scoring. In the 2002 playoffs, Vašíček had three goals and five points in 23 games, helping the Hurricanes to the 2002 Stanley Cup Final, where they eventually lost in five games to the Detroit Red Wings.

Vašíček had an injury-plagued 2002–03 season, missing 25 games due to injuries. In 57 games played, he had ten goals and 20 points as Carolina failed to make the 2003 playoffs. On January 22, 2003, Vašíček recorded his first multi-goal game in the NHL, scoring twice against Olaf Kölzig of the Washington Capitals in a 5–3 loss.

Vašíček had his best NHL season with the Hurricanes in 2003–04, appearing in all 82 games and scoring 19 goals and 45 points to lead the team in scoring. He recorded his first NHL hat-trick on October 28, 2003, against Vesa Toskala of the San Jose Sharks in a 3–0 victory. Despite the personal success, however, the Hurricanes struggled and missed-out the playoffs for the second-straight season.

During the 2004–05 NHL lockout, Vašíček returned to the Czech Republic to play for Slavia Prague, where he scored 20 goals and 43 points in 52 games to lead the team in scoring. Additionally, in seven playoff games, he scored one goal and six assists.

When the NHL resumed play in 2005–06, Vašíček returned to play for Carolina. In a game on November 11, 2005, against Florida Panthers, he suffered a major knee injury that forced him out of the Hurricanes lineup until April 3, 2006. In his first game back, Vašíček scored two goals and four points in a 6–5 win over Washington. At the end of the regular season, he appeared in 23 games, scoring four goals and nine points. In eight playoff games, Vašíček recorded no points, although the Hurricanes still won the Stanley Cup in the Final over the Edmonton Oilers. On July 18, 2006, the Hurricanes traded Vašíček to the Nashville Predators in exchange for Scott Walker.

Vašíček began his 2006–07 season on his Predators debut on October 5, 2006, marking the occasion by scoring a goal against Nikolai Khabibulin of the Chicago Blackhawks in an 8–6 loss. Vašíček, however, struggled with the Predators — in 38 games, he had just four goals and 13 points, prompting Nashville, on February 9, 2007, to trade him back to Carolina in exchange for Éric Bélanger. In his first game back with the Hurricanes, on February 10, Vašíček was held pointless in a 5–4 loss to the Minnesota Wild. Three nights later, he recorded his first point back on February 13, recording an assist in a 2–1 win over the Los Angeles Kings. He then scored his first goal back with Carolina on February 27 in a 4–2 loss to the Ottawa Senators. Just under one month later, he had a three-point game on March 17, scoring a goal and two assists in a 7–2 win over the New Jersey Devils. He finished the season with two goals and nine points in 25 games with Carolina.

After the conclusion of the 2006–07 season, Vašíček became an unrestricted free agent, where, on August 15, 2007, he signed a one-year, $750,000 contract with the New York Islanders. He made his Islanders debut on October 5 and marked the occasion by scoring a goal against Ryan Miller of the Buffalo Sabres in a 6–4 win. Vašíček had his most productive NHL season since 2003–04, as he scored 16 goals and 35 points in 81 games.

After the season, Vašíček again became an unrestricted free agent, opting to join Lokomotiv Yaroslavl of the newly-formed Kontinental Hockey League (KHL) for the 2008–09 season. In 56 games, he had 12 goals and 32 points, helping the team to the KHL playoffs, where in 19 playoff games, he had five goals and 15 points.

He returned to Yaroslavl for the 2009–10 season, as Vašíček improved his offensive numbers to 21 goals and 48 points to lead the team in scoring. In 17 playoff games, he had six goals and 13 points.

In 2010–11, Vašíček once again improved offensively, scoring 24 goals and 55 points in 54 games, finishing second in team scoring and seventh in KHL scoring. In 18 playoff games, he had a KHL-high 22 points, scoring seven goals and adding 15 assists, though Yaroslavl eventually lost in the Western Conference final.

Vašíček returned to the club for the 2011–12, however, he died in the 2011 Lokomotiv Yaroslavl plane crash with his teammates on September 7, 2011.

After his death in 2011, the Carolina Professional Hockey Writers Association (PHWA) rechristened the Good Guy Award as the Josef Vašíček Award. The award is given annually by the Carolina PHWA to one Hurricanes player in recognition of their outstanding cooperation with the local media.

== International play ==
Vašíček played internationally for the Czech Republic. He played in the 2000 World Junior Ice Hockey Championships held in Sweden, scoring a goal and four points in seven games as the Czechs won the gold medal.

Vasicek then appeared at the senior level in the 2003 IIHF World Championship in Finland, scoring two assists in nine games as the Czechs finished fourth. The next year, he played in one game at the 2004 World Cup of Hockey, scoring no points, as his team won the bronze. At the 2005 IIHF World Championship in Austria, Vašíček had a goal and two points, helping his country to gold. His next international appearance was at the 2009 IIHF World Championship held in Switzerland, where he scored one goal and two assists in six games as the Czech Republic finished sixth.

At the 2010 Winter Olympics in Vancouver, Vašíček had no points in five games as the Czech Republic finished in seventh place.

== Personal life ==
Vašíček was related by marriage to longtime NHL forward Thomas Vanek; Vanek's brother is married to Vašíček's sister.

== Death ==
On September 7, 2011, just 5 days before his 31st birthday, Vašíček was killed when a Yakovlev Yak-42 passenger aircraft, carrying the entire Lokomotiv team, crashed just outside Yaroslavl, Russia. The team was traveling to Minsk to play their opening game of the season, with its coaching staff and prospects.

== Career statistics ==
=== Regular season and playoffs ===
			Regular season					Playoffs
Season	Team	League	GP	G	A	Pts	PIM	GP	G	A	Pts	PIM
1996–97	HC Slavia Praha	CZE U18	37	20	40	60	—	—	—	—	—	—
1997–98	HC Slavia Praha	CZE U20	34	13	20	33	—	—	—	—	—	—
1998–99	Sault Ste. Marie Greyhounds	OHL	66	21	35	56	30	5	3	0	3	10
1999–00	Sault Ste. Marie Greyhounds	OHL	54	26	46	72	49	17	5	15	20	8
2000–01	Carolina Hurricanes	NHL	76	8	13	21	53	6	2	0	2	0
2000–01	Cincinnati Cyclones	IHL	—	—	—	—	—	3	0	0	0	0
2001–02	Carolina Hurricanes	NHL	78	14	17	31	53	23	3	2	5	12
2002–03	Carolina Hurricanes	NHL	57	10	10	20	33	—	—	—	—	—
2003–04	Carolina Hurricanes	NHL	82	19	26	45	60	—	—	—	—	—
2004–05	HC Slavia Praha	ELH	52	20	23	43	40	7	1	6	7	10
2005–06	Carolina Hurricanes	NHL	23	4	5	9	8	8	0	0	0	2
2006–07	Carolina Hurricanes	NHL	25	2	7	9	22	—	—	—	—	—
2006–07	Nashville Predators	NHL	38	4	9	13	29	—	—	—	—	—
2007–08	New York Islanders	NHL	81	16	19	35	53	—	—	—	—	—
2008–09	Lokomotiv Yaroslavl	KHL	56	12	20	32	81	19	5	10	15	20
2009–10	Lokomotiv Yaroslavl	KHL	56	21	27	48	54	17	6	7	13	26
2010–11	Lokomotiv Yaroslavl	KHL	54	24	31	55	34	18	7	15	22	16
KHL totals			166	57	78	135	169	54	18	32	50	62
NHL totals			460	77	106	183	311	37	5	2	7	14

=== International ===
Year	Team	Event	GP	G	A	Pts	PIM
1998	Czech Republic	EJC	6	2	2	4	4
2000	Czech Republic	WJC	7	1	3	4	2
2003	Czech Republic	WC	9	0	2	2	2
2004	Czech Republic	WCH	1	0	0	0	0
2005	Czech Republic	WC	8	1	1	2	4
2009	Czech Republic	WC	6	1	2	3	6
2010	Czech Republic	OG	5	0	0	0	2
Junior totals			13	3	5	8	6
Senior totals			29	2	5	7	14

== Awards and achievements ==
- 1999–00: Third All-Star Team (OHL)
- 2005–06: Won the Stanley Cup (NHL)

== See also ==
- List of ice hockey players who died during their playing careers
