= Robert Dietrich =

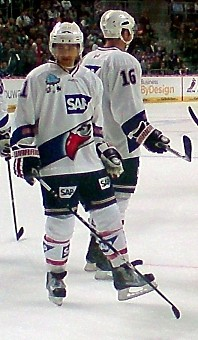
- Born: 25 July 1986 Ordzhonikidze, Kazakh SSR, USSR
- Died: 7 September 2011 (aged 25) Yaroslavl, Russia
- Height: 5 ft 10 in (178 cm)
- Weight: 172 lb (78 kg; 12 st 4 lb)
- Position: Defence
- Shot: Left
- Played for: DEG Metro Stars; Straubing Tigers; Milwaukee Admirals; Adler Mannheim
- National team: Germany
- NHL draft: 174th overall, 2007; Nashville Predators
- Playing career: 2003–2011

Robert Dietrich (25 July 1986 – 7 September 2011) was a German professional ice hockey defenceman. He died in the 2011 Lokomotiv Yaroslavl plane crash, which claimed the lives of the entire team's players and coaching staff aboard the flight.

== Playing career ==
Dietrich was selected 174th overall by the Nashville Predators in the sixth round of the 2007 NHL entry draft. He played for the DEG Metro Stars in the DEL between 2005 and 2008. On July 16, 2007, he signed a three-year entry-level deal with the Predators. He spent the first season of his contract back on loan with the Metro Stars before heading to North America, where he played his final two seasons with the Milwaukee Admirals, the Predators' AHL affiliate.

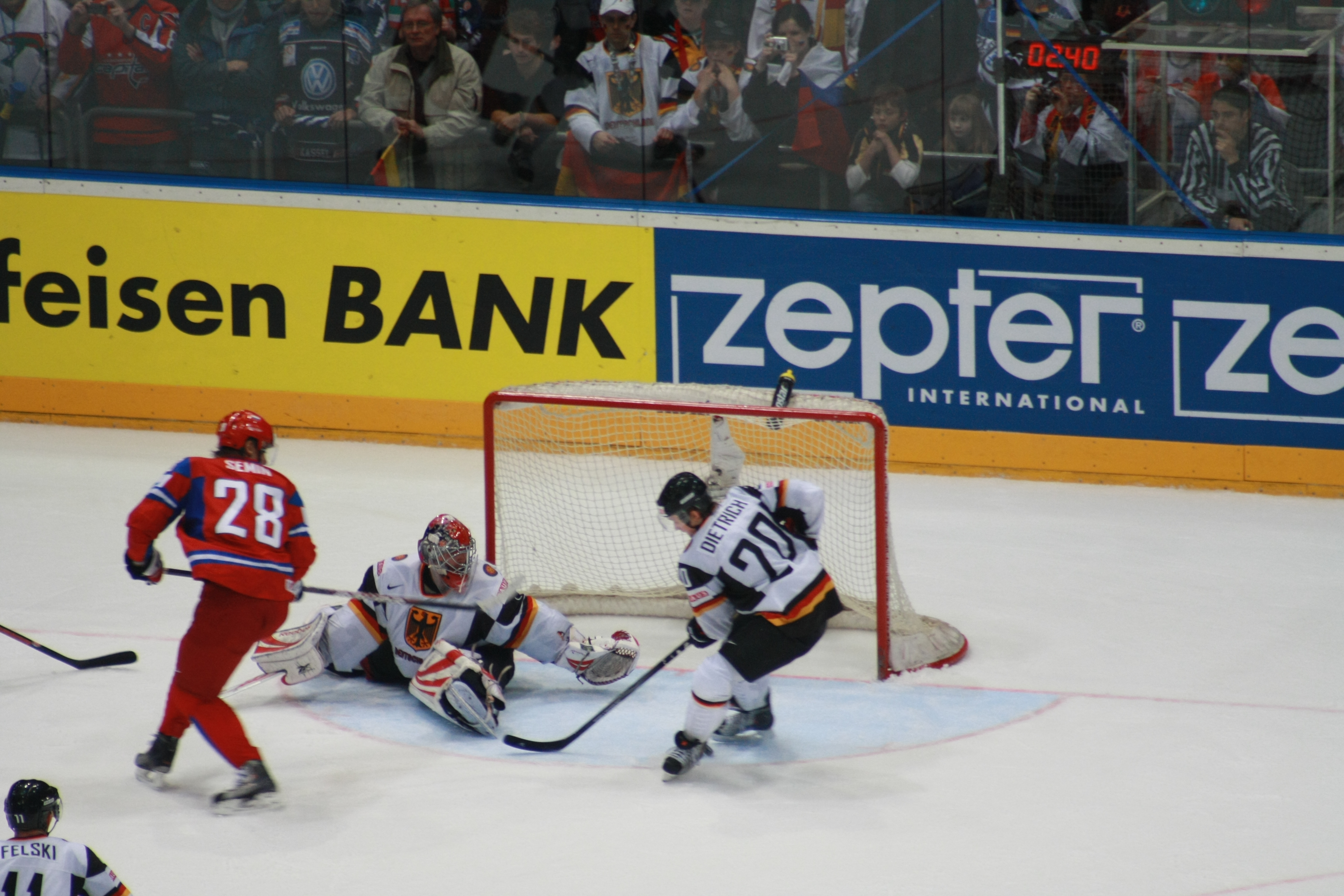
Robert Dietrich in 2010 Men's World Ice Hockey Championships

During his second season with the Admirals in the 2009–10 season, Dietrich established himself as an offensive contributor from the blue line, leading all Admirals defensemen in scoring with an impressive 43 points. Despite his strong performance and consistent play, Dietrich was unable to secure a promotion to the NHL with Nashville. Seeking greater opportunities and a return to his home country, Dietrich chose to continue his professional career in Germany. On June 8, 2010, he signed a two-year contract with Adler Mannheim of the Deutsche Eishockey Liga (DEL).

== Death ==
On September 7, 2011, Dietrich tragically lost his life in a plane crash involving a Yakovlev Yak-42 aircraft near Yaroslavl, Russia. The flight was transporting nearly the entire Lokomotiv Yaroslavl hockey team, including coaches and young players, to Minsk, Belarus, where they were scheduled to play their first game of the season. Lokomotiv officials said, "everyone from the main roster was on the plane plus four players from the youth team."

== Career statistics ==
=== Regular season and playoffs ===
			Regular season					Playoffs
Season	Team	League	GP	G	A	Pts	PIM	GP	G	A	Pts	PIM
2002–03	Jungadler Mannheim	GER U18	33	4	13	17	39	3	0	1	1	4
2003–04	EC Peiting	GER.3	31	4	7	11	40	11	1	2	3	43
2004–05	ETC Crimmitschau	GER.2	45	3	14	17	34	—	—	—	—	—
2005–06	DEG Metro Stars	DEL	4	0	0	0	2	—	—	—	—	—
2005–06	Straubing Tigers	GER.2	46	5	3	8	55	15	0	1	1	8
2006–07	DEG Metro Stars	DEL	52	3	19	22	28	9	2	4	6	22
2007–08	DEG Metro Stars	DEL	9	1	1	2	12	13	1	2	3	4
2008–09	Milwaukee Admirals	AHL	63	4	15	19	32	11	1	7	8	2
2009–10	Milwaukee Admirals	AHL	79	6	37	43	28	2	0	1	1	2
2010–11	Adler Mannheim	DEL	42	3	15	18	69	6	0	2	2	8
DEL totals			107	7	35	42	111	28	3	8	11	34

=== International ===
Year	Team	Event	GP	G	A	Pts	PIM
2004	Germany	WJC18 D1	5	0	4	4	4
2005	Germany	WJC	6	0	0	0	6
2006	Germany	WJC D1	5	0	1	1	4
2007	Germany	WC	6	2	2	4	2
2010	Germany	WC	9	0	0	0	2
2011	Germany	WC	7	0	0	0	0
Junior totals			16	0	5	5	14
Senior totals			22	2	2	4	4

== See also ==
- List of ice hockey players who died during their playing career
