= KHL conference finals =

The Kontinental Hockey League (KHL) conference finals are the Eastern Conference and Western Conference championship series of the KHL. The conference finals are best-of-seven series. The two series are played after the first and second rounds of the playoffs and before the Gagarin Cup finals. The final two teams in the Eastern Conference and Western Conference face off. The series are the conference equivalents of the Gagarin Cup finals. The conferences were established during the second season of competition. In the inaugural season there were no conferences, only four divisions. The respective winners of the Eastern and Western Conference finals receive the Eastern Conference winner cup (Russian: Кубок Победителю конференции Восток, Kubok Pobeditelyu konferentsii Vostok) and Western Conference winner cup.(Russian: Кубок Победителю конференции Запад, Kubok Pobeditelyu konferentsii Zapad).

== Eastern Conference ==
Season	East champion	Series	East runner-up	Eventual cup winner
2009–10	(Russia) Ak Bars Kazan	4–2	(Russia) Salavat Yulaev Ufa	•
2010–11	(Russia) Salavat Yulaev Ufa	4–3	(Russia) Metallurg Magnitogorsk	•
2011–12	(Russia) Avangard Omsk	4–1	(Russia) Traktor Chelyabinsk	
2012–13	(Russia) Traktor Chelyabinsk	4–3	(Russia) Ak Bars Kazan	
2013–14	(Russia) Metallurg Magnitogorsk	4–1	(Russia) Salavat Yulaev Ufa	•
2014–15	(Russia) Ak Bars Kazan	4–1	(Russia) Sibir Novosibirsk	
2015–16	(Russia) Metallurg Magnitogorsk	4–1	(Russia) Salavat Yulaev Ufa	•
2016–17	(Russia) Metallurg Magnitogorsk	4–0	(Russia) Ak Bars Kazan	
2017–18	(Russia) Ak Bars Kazan	4–0	(Russia) Traktor Chelyabinsk	•

== Western Conference ==
Season	West champion	Series	West runner-up	Eventual cup winner
2009–10	(Russia) MVD Balashikha	4–3	(Russia) Lokomotiv Yaroslavl	
2010–11	(Russia) Atlant Moscow Oblast	4–2	(Russia) Lokomotiv Yaroslavl	
2011–12	(Russia) Dynamo Moscow	4–0	(Russia) SKA Saint Petersburg	•
2012–13	(Russia) Dynamo Moscow	4–2	(Russia) SKA Saint Petersburg	•
2013–14	(Czech Republic) Lev Prague	4–1	(Russia) Lokomotiv Yaroslavl	
2014–15	(Russia) SKA Saint Petersburg	4–3	(Russia) CSKA Moscow	•
2015–16	(Russia) CSKA Moscow	4–0	(Russia) SKA Saint Petersburg	
2016–17	(Russia) SKA Saint Petersburg	4–0	(Russia) Lokomotiv Yaroslavl	•
2017–18	(Russia) CSKA Moscow	4–2	(Russia) SKA Saint Petersburg	
