= Alexander Galimov =

Russian ice hockey player

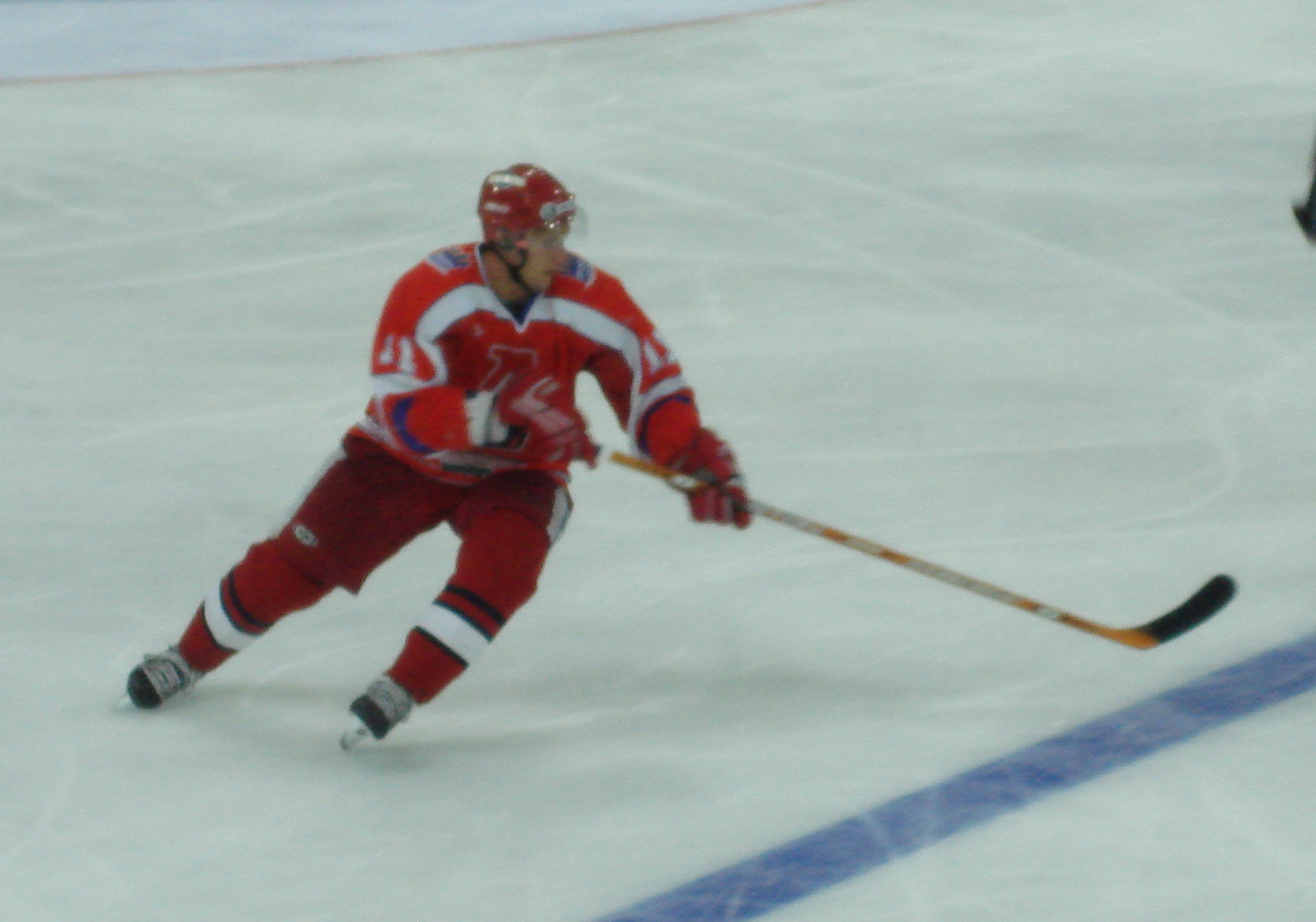
- Galimov playing for Lokomotiv Yaroslavl in 2008
- Born: 2 May 1985 Yaroslavl, Soviet Union
- Died: 12 September 2011 (aged 26) Moscow, Russia
- Height: 6 ft 0 in (183 cm)
- Weight: 196 lb (89 kg; 14 st 0 lb)
- Position: Right wing
- Shot: Left
- Played for: Lokomotiv Yaroslavl
- National team: Russia
- Playing career: 2004–2011

Alexander Saidgereyevich Galimov (Russian: Александр Саидгереевич Галимов; 2 May 1985 – 12 September 2011) was a Russian professional ice hockey player. At the time of his death, he was a member of Lokomotiv Yaroslavl of the Kontinental Hockey League (KHL) whose team plane crashed on 7 September 2011 killing all but one of the 45 crew and passengers on board.

== Playing career ==
Alexander Galimov was born in 1985 in Yaroslavl, then the Soviet Union. He began his professional career in 2004 with Lokomotiv Yaroslavl. The 6-foot, 196-pounder, played 341 RSL/KHL games, scoring 64 goals and 126 points, while racking up 280 penalty minutes.

Galimov was a member of the silver medal-winning Russian U20 team at the 2005 World Junior Ice Hockey Championships. He also played for the Russia men's national ice hockey team on the 2009–10 and 2010–11 Euro Hockey Tours.

== Death ==
On 7 September 2011, a Yakovlev Yak-42 passenger aircraft, carrying nearly the entire Lokomotiv Yaroslavl team including Galimov, crashed just outside Yaroslavl, Russia. The team was traveling to Minsk to play their opening game of the season, with its coaching staff and prospects. Galimov was the only player from the team's roster who was on the plane to survive the initial impact. A crew member, Alexander Sizov, also survived.

Galimov suffered burns to over 80 percent of his body. The medical team in Yaroslavl managed to stabilize him, and on the following day, 8 September, he was transported to the Vishnevsky Institute of Surgery of the Russian Academy of Medical Sciences, where he was placed in a medically induced coma, and on artificial ventilation.

On 12 September 2011, Galimov died from the burns he had sustained in the crash five days earlier. Lokomotiv Yaroslavl marketing manager Yevgeni Chuev said it was likely that another memorial, this time specifically for Galimov, would be held on 13 September 2011.

== Career statistics ==
=== Regular season and playoffs ===
			Regular season					Playoffs
Season	Team	League	GP	G	A	Pts	PIM	GP	G	A	Pts	PIM
2004–05	Lokomotiv Yaroslavl	RSL	41	1	1	2	37	9	0	0	0	0
2005–06	Lokomotiv Yaroslavl	RSL	35	5	3	8	46	11	3	0	3	2
2006–07	Lokomotiv Yaroslavl	RSL	54	16	13	29	50	7	1	1	2	10
2007–08	Lokomotiv Yaroslavl	RSL	51	9	9	18	45	10	0	0	0	14
2008–09	Lokomotiv Yaroslavl	KHL	55	7	6	13	28	19	2	2	4	8
2009–10	Lokomotiv Yaroslavl	KHL	52	13	12	25	46	16	8	6	14	33
2010–11	Lokomotiv Yaroslavl	KHL	53	13	18	31	31	18	9	5	14	10
RSL/KHL totals			341	64	62	126	283	90	23	14	37	77

Medal record

Representing Russia

Ice hockey

World Junior Championships
Silver medal – second place	2005 USA	

=== International ===
Year	Team	Event	Result	GP	G	A	Pts	PIM
2005	Russia	WJC	2nd place, silver medalist(s)	6	1	2	3	0
Junior totals				6	1	2	3	0

== See also ==
- List of ice hockey players who died during their careers
