= Latvian Railways Cup =

The Latvian Railways Cup (Latvian: Latvijas Dzelzceļa kauss) is an annual traditional international ice hockey tournament, with the participation of teams from the Kontinental Hockey League. It is sponsored by Latvian Railways.
