= Kārlis Skrastiņš =

Latvian ice hockey player (1974–2011)

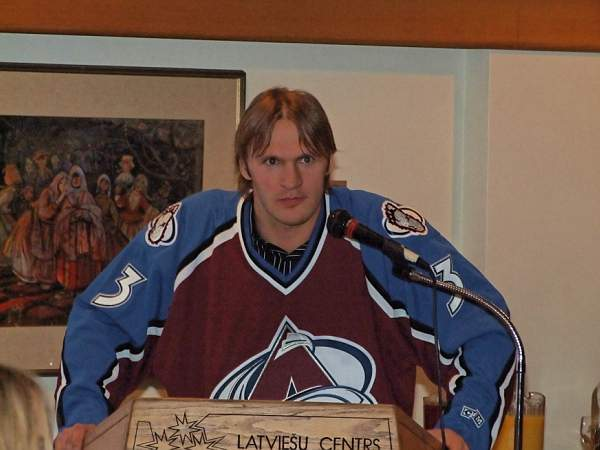
- Skrastiņš in 2006
- Born: July 9, 1974 Riga, Latvian SSR, Soviet Union
- Died: September 7, 2011 (aged 37) Yaroslavl, Russia
- Height: 6 ft 1 in (185 cm)
- Weight: 210 lb (95 kg; 15 st 0 lb)
- Position: Defence
- Shot: Left
- Played for: Pārdaugava Rīga; TPS; Nashville Predators; Colorado Avalanche; Florida Panthers; HK Rīga 2000; Dallas Stars
- National team: Latvia
- NHL draft: 230th overall, 1998; Nashville Predators
- Playing career: 1991–2011

Kārlis Skrastiņš (July 9, 1974 – September 7, 2011) was a Latvian professional ice hockey player. Skrastiņš was drafted by the Nashville Predators of the National Hockey League in 1998 as a defenceman and spent twelve years in the league playing for the Predators, the Colorado Avalanche, the Florida Panthers, and the Dallas Stars.

For the 2011–2012 season, Skrastiņš left the NHL and signed a contract to play in Russia for Lokomotiv Yaroslavl of the Kontinental Hockey League (KHL). However, he never got to play a game for Lokomotiv as he was killed in the 2011 Lokomotiv Yaroslavl plane crash that killed almost the entire team on September 7, 2011.

== Playing career ==
Skrastiņš was drafted by Nashville Predators with the 230th pick in the ninth round of 1998 NHL entry draft. On October 15, 2002, against the New York Islanders, he scored a 5-on-3 shorthanded goal. He played for Nashville for five seasons until being traded to the Colorado Avalanche in 2003. On February 8, 2007, he played in his 487th consecutive game to pass Tim Horton for the longest playing streak in NHL history for a defenceman. Skrastiņš' streak ended at 495 games, when he missed a February 25, 2007 game against the Anaheim Ducks with a knee injury. He had previously missed only one other game due to injury in his career — against St. Louis on February 18, 2000, with a minor shoulder injury. The streak led to him being given the nickname "Ironman".

In his fourth season with the Avalanche in 2007–08, he was traded to the Florida Panthers for Ruslan Salei (who also died in the Lokomotiv plane crash) on February 26, 2008. In his first full season with the Panthers in 2008–09, Skrastiņš scored a career high 18 points in 80 games. On October 16, 2008, he played his 600th career NHL game against the Minnesota Wild and on November 1, 2008, he scored his 100th point in his NHL career in a 3–2 loss fittingly against his original club, the Nashville Predators.

On July 2, 2009, he was signed by the Dallas Stars to a two-year contract worth $2.75 million. He scored his only two goals of the 2009–10 season, including the game winner, on December 19 in a 4–3 Stars victory over the Detroit Red Wings.

On May 17, 2011, after eleven seasons in the NHL, Skrastiņš left to sign a contract with Russian team, Lokomotiv Yaroslavl.

== Death ==
Skrastins died on September 7, 2011, when a Yakovlev Yak-42 passenger aircraft, carrying nearly the entire Lokomotiv Yaroslavl team, crashed just outside Yaroslavl, Russia. The team was traveling to Minsk to play their opening game of the season, with its coaching staff and prospects. Lokomotiv officials said "'everyone from the main roster was on the plane plus four players from the youth team.'"

== Career statistics ==
=== Regular season and playoffs ===
| | | | Regular season | | | | | Playoffs |
| Season | Team | League | GP | G | A | Pts | PIM | GP | G | A | Pts | PIM |
|---|---|---|---|---|---|---|---|---|---|---|---|---|
| 1991–92 | Stars Rīga | LAT | 16 | 7 | 6 | 13 | 10 | — | — | — | — | — |
| 1992–93 | Pārdaugava Rīga | LAT | 10 | 7 | 2 | 9 | 12 | — | — | — | — | — |
| 1992–93 | Pārdaugava Rīga | RUS | 40 | 3 | 5 | 8 | 16 | 2 | 0 | 0 | 0 | 0 |
| 1993–94 | Pārdaugava Rīga | RUS | 42 | 7 | 5 | 12 | 18 | 2 | 1 | 0 | 1 | 4 |
| 1994–95 | Pārdaugava Rīga | RUS | 52 | 4 | 14 | 18 | 69 | — | — | — | — | — |
| 1995–96 | TPS | SM-l | 50 | 4 | 11 | 15 | 32 | 11 | 2 | 2 | 4 | 10 |
| 1996–97 | TPS | SM-l | 50 | 2 | 8 | 10 | 20 | 12 | 0 | 4 | 4 | 2 |
| 1997–98 | TPS | SM-l | 48 | 4 | 15 | 19 | 67 | 4 | 0 | 0 | 0 | 0 |
| 1998–99 | Nashville Predators | NHL | 2 | 0 | 1 | 1 | 0 | — | — | — | — | — |
| 1998–99 | Milwaukee Admirals | IHL | 75 | 8 | 36 | 44 | 47 | 2 | 0 | 1 | 1 | 2 |
| 1999–2000 | Nashville Predators | NHL | 59 | 5 | 6 | 11 | 20 | — | — | — | — | — |
| 1999–2000 | Milwaukee Admirals | IHL | 19 | 3 | 8 | 11 | 10 | — | — | — | — | — |
| 2000–01 | Nashville Predators | NHL | 82 | 1 | 11 | 12 | 30 | — | — | — | — | — |
| 2001–02 | Nashville Predators | NHL | 82 | 4 | 13 | 17 | 36 | — | — | — | — | — |
| 2002–03 | Nashville Predators | NHL | 82 | 3 | 10 | 13 | 44 | — | — | — | — | — |
| 2003–04 | Colorado Avalanche | NHL | 82 | 5 | 8 | 13 | 26 | 11 | 0 | 2 | 2 | 2 |
| 2004–05 | HK Rīga 2000 | BLR | 34 | 8 | 17 | 25 | 30 | 3 | 0 | 0 | 0 | 25 |
| 2004–05 | HK Rīga 2000 | LAT | 4 | 0 | 4 | 4 | 0 | 9 | 3 | 10 | 13 | 33 |
| 2005–06 | Colorado Avalanche | NHL | 82 | 3 | 11 | 14 | 65 | 9 | 0 | 1 | 1 | 10 |
| 2006–07 | Colorado Avalanche | NHL | 68 | 0 | 11 | 11 | 30 | — | — | — | — | — |
| 2007–08 | Colorado Avalanche | NHL | 43 | 1 | 3 | 4 | 20 | — | — | — | — | — |
| 2007–08 | Florida Panthers | NHL | 17 | 1 | 0 | 1 | 12 | — | — | — | — | — |
| 2008–09 | Florida Panthers | NHL | 80 | 4 | 14 | 18 | 30 | — | — | — | — | — |
| 2009–10 | Dallas Stars | NHL | 79 | 2 | 11 | 13 | 24 | — | — | — | — | — |
| 2010–11 | Dallas Stars | NHL | 74 | 3 | 5 | 8 | 38 | — | — | — | — | — |
| RUS totals | | | 134 | 14 | 24 | 38 | 103 | 4 | 1 | 0 | 1 | 4 |
| SM-l totals | | | 148 | 10 | 34 | 44 | 119 | 27 | 2 | 6 | 8 | 12 |
| NHL totals | | | 832 | 32 | 104 | 136 | 375 | 20 | 0 | 3 | 3 | 12 |

=== International ===
| Year | Team | Event | Result | GP | G | A | Pts | PIM |
|---|---|---|---|---|---|---|---|---|
| 1993 | Latvia | WC C | 21st | 7 | 1 | 6 | 7 | 0 |
| 1993 | Latvia | OGQ | DNQ | 4 | 1 | 1 | 2 | 2 |
| 1994 | Latvia | WJC C | 18th | 4 | 1 | 5 | 6 | 33 |
| 1994 | Latvia | WC B | 14th | 7 | 3 | 5 | 8 | 0 |
| 1995 | Latvia | WC B | 14th | 7 | 1 | 1 | 2 | 4 |
| 1996 | Latvia | WC B | 13th | 7 | 2 | 2 | 4 | 8 |
| 1997 | Latvia | WC | 7th | 8 | 0 | 3 | 3 | 4 |
| 1998 | Latvia | WC | 9th | 6 | 0 | 1 | 1 | 6 |
| 1999 | Latvia | WC | 11th | 6 | 1 | 1 | 2 | 6 |
| 2000 | Latvia | WC | 8th | 7 | 1 | 2 | 3 | 4 |
| 2001 | Latvia | WC | 13th | 6 | 3 | 0 | 3 | 0 |
| 2002 | Latvia | OG | 9th | 1 | 0 | 0 | 0 | 0 |
| 2003 | Latvia | WC | 9th | 6 | 3 | 3 | 6 | 27 |
| 2005 | Latvia | OGQ | Q | 3 | 1 | 0 | 1 | 0 |
| 2005 | Latvia | WC | 9th | 6 | 2 | 0 | 2 | 2 |
| 2006 | Latvia | OG | 12th | 5 | 0 | 1 | 1 | 0 |
| 2009 | Latvia | WC | 7th | 7 | 1 | 1 | 2 | 0 |
| 2010 | Latvia | OG | 12th | 4 | 0 | 0 | 0 | 0 |
| Junior totals | | | | 5 | 2 | 5 | 7 | 33 |
| Senior totals | | | | 99 | 20 | 28 | 48 | 67 |

== See also ==
- List of ice hockey players who died during their careers
