= Golden Ring Yaroslavl International Airport =

Airport in Yaroslavl, Russia

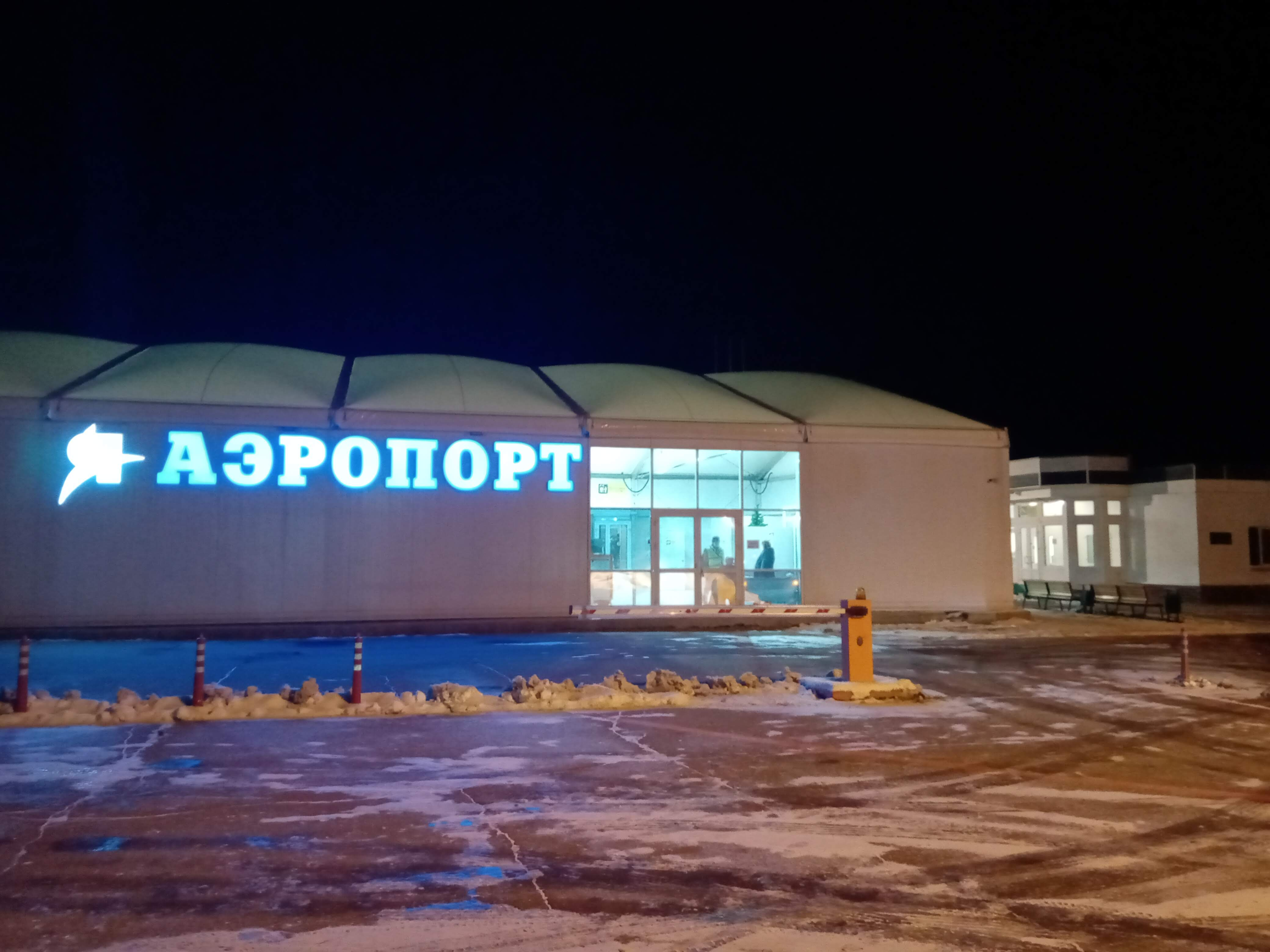
- IATA: IAR; ICAO: UUDL; LID: ЯРТ

Summary
- Airport type: Public
- Owner: Yaroslavl Oblast Government
- Operator: Aerofuels Group Ltd.
- Serves: Yaroslavl
- Location: Tunoshna, Russia
- Time zone: UTC+3 ({{{utc}}})
- Elevation AMSL: 285 ft / 87 m
- Coordinates: 57°33′38.40″N 40°9′26.53″E
- Website: iaravia.ru

Map

Runways
Direction	Length		Surface
Direction	ft	m	Surface
05/23	9,842	3,010	Asphalt concrete

Golden Ring Yaroslavl International Airport (Russian: Международный аэропорт Ярославля Золотое кольцо) (IATA: IAR, ICAO: UUDL) is an airport in Yaroslavl Oblast, Russia, located 18 km southeast of Yaroslavl. It is served by medium-sized airliners. The airport is situated next to the Volga River. It was formerly known as Tunoshna Airport.

== History ==
During the Cold War Tunoshna was a key interceptor aircraft base. It was home to the 415th Fighter Aviation Regiment PVO (415 IAP), 3rd Air Defence Corps, Moscow Air Defence District. The regiment arrived at Tunoshna from Audun in China in March 1953. The regiment flew the MiG-15, then the MiG-17F, and then the Sukhoi Su-9 (Fishpot) in the 1960s. The regiment replaced it in 1979 with the MiG-23P (Flogger-G). This aircraft served at Tunoshna during the 1980s and 1990s. The 415 IAP was decommissioned in 1994 and the MiG-23s were sent to Rzhev.

On July 18, 2025 Airport was officially renamed as Golden Ring Yaroslavl International Airport in order to promote Yaroslavl and Yaroslavl Oblast as a principal tourist destinations in the Golden Ring of Russia.

== Terminals ==
The passenger terminal (with an area of 1000 m^{2}) is designed to handle 180 domestic or 100 international passengers per hour. The cargo terminal (with an area of 833 m^{2}) is designed to handle up to 150 tonnes of cargo per day. The airport complex entered service in 2002 and was reconstructed in 2013.

== Airlines and destinations ==
As of July 2025 airport serves following destinations:

Airlines	Destinations
azimuth	Samara, Sochi
Red Wings Airlines	Saint Petersburg
RusLine	Moscow–Vnukovo, Naryan-Mar, Perm, Saint Petersburg
UVT Aero	Kazan

== Accidents and incidents ==
On 6 September 1994, the MiG-23UB crashed into terrain due to loss of control.

On 7 September 2011, the 2011 Lokomotiv Yaroslavl plane crash occurred, killing nearly the entire Lokomotiv Yaroslavl Kontinental Hockey League professional ice hockey team. A Yak-Service Yak-42, carrying the team to a game in Minsk, Belarus crashed on take-off from Tunoshna, killing 44 of the 45 occupants. The plane crashed and broke up approximately 1 kilometre (0.62 mi) from the end of the runway, at the Volga River. The cause was determined to be pilot error, when one of the two pilots incorrectly applied braking during takeoff, attributed to a lack of training in the aircraft.

== See also ==
- List of airports in Russia
- List of military airbases in Russia
