= Lokomotiv Yaroslavl =

Russian professional ice hockey team

- City: Yaroslavl, Russia
- League: KHL; 2008–2011, 2012–present: VHL 2011–2012; RSL 1996–2008; IHL 1992–1996; Soviet League Class A 1987–1992; Soviet League Class A2 1966–1967, 1968–1970, 1983–1987; Soviet League Class A3 1967–1968, 1970–1983; Soviet League Class B 1963–1966
- Conference: Western
- Division: Tarasov
- Founded: 1959
- Home arena: Arena 2000 (capacity: 8,905)
- Colours: Red, blue, white, silver
- Owner: Russian Railways
- President: Yuri Yakovlev
- Head coach: Bob Hartley
- Captain: Alexander Yelesin
- Affiliates: Molot-Prikamye Perm (VHL); Loko (MHL)
- Website: hclokomotiv.ru
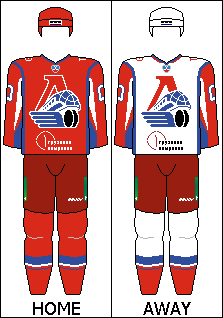

Franchise history
- Lokomotiv Yaroslavl 2000–present Torpedo Yaroslavl 1965–2000; Motor Yaroslavl 1964–1965; Trud Yaroslavl 1963–1964; YaMZ Yaroslavl 1959–1963

Hockey Club Lokomotiv (Russian: ХК Локомотив, English: Locomotive HC), also known as Lokomotiv Yaroslavl, is a professional ice hockey club based in Yaroslavl, Russia. It is a member of the Tarasov Division in the Kontinental Hockey League (KHL). The name of the team is derived from its owner, Russian Railways, the national railroad operator.

On 7 September 2011, nearly the entire team perished in a plane crash. The team's flight to a game in Minsk crashed during takeoff, killing all of the team's roster (except forward Maxim Zyuzyakin, who was not on the flight), all coaching staff (except goaltending coach Jorma Valtonen, not on the flight) and four players from the Loko 9 juniors squad of the Minor Hockey League (MHL). The tragedy forced Lokomotiv Yaroslavl to cancel their participation in the 2011–12 KHL season. In their 16th season in the KHL in 2024–25, Lokomotiv captured the Gagarin Cup, their first in franchise history.

== History ==
The team has been known previously by several different names:

- YaMZ Yaroslavl (1959–1963)
- Trud Yaroslavl (1963–1964)
- Motor Yaroslavl (1964–1965)
- Torpedo Yaroslavl (1965–2000)
- Lokomotiv Yaroslavl (2000–present)

The team generally played in the Second League of the Class "A" group during the Soviet era, being promoted to the First League of Class "A" for the 1983–84 season. Known as Torpedo Yaroslavl at that time, the team enjoyed moderate success under head coach Sergei Alekseyevich Nikolaev. Never a powerful club during the Soviet era, the team became a consistent winner with the creation of the Russian Superleague (RSL) following the collapse of the Soviet Union, winning its first RSL championship in 1997 under coach Petr Vorobiev. The club moved from Avtodizel Arena to the new Arena 2000 early in the 2001–02 season, and won consecutive league championships in 2002 and 2003 under Czech head coach Vladimír Vujtek, Sr. Vujtek left the club after the 2002–03 season for a contract offer from rival Ak Bars Kazan. Lokomotiv has not been able to replicate its success since that time, but has remained a perennial contender in the RSL and then the later KHL.

=== 2011 plane crash ===
On 7 September 2011, the Lokomotiv club was to travel to Minsk for its first game of the 2011–12 KHL season when the airplane that was carrying the team crashed following a botched take-off from Tunoshna Airport. Among the 45 passengers and crew on board, only flight engineer Alexander Sizov survived the crash. 26-year-old Lokomotiv forward Alexander Galimov, who had been with the team since 2004, was pulled out of the crash alive and conscious, but had burns to 80 percent of his body and died five days later in a hospital in Moscow.

Prior to the crash, the team played nine pre-season games, finishing with a 7–2 record. On 3 September 2011, in Lokomotiv's last pre-season game, at home against Torpedo, Galimov scored the team's last pre-crash goal in a 5–2 victory.

In the aftermath of the crash, KHL president Alexander Medvedev announced that a disaster draft would be held to allow Lokomotiv Yaroslavl to ice a team for the 2011–12 season. However, on 10 September 2011, the team announced its intention not to participate in the 2011–2012 KHL season, opting to play in the Supreme Hockey League (VHL) for one season before returning to the KHL. Former coach Petr Vorobiev returned to the team as its head coach for the VHL season. Also, Lokomotiv Yaroslavl's squad for the following season would automatically be qualified for the KHL playoffs, and the club could request allowance to use more than six non-Russian players in the KHL squad.

The accident was the second plane crash in Russia involving a hockey team; in 1950, the entire VVS Moscow team was killed in an air disaster near Sverdlovsk (now Yekaterinburg).

Since the disaster, Lokomotiv's jerseys have featured a memorial patch depicting a black ribbon inscribed with the date of the crash.

=== 2012–13 season ===
On 9 April 2012, Tom Rowe, formerly an assistant coach with the Carolina Hurricanes of the National Hockey League (NHL), signed on as the team's new head coach.

For the 2012–13 KHL season, Lokomotiv added former NHL players Viktor Kozlov, Niklas Hagman, Staffan Kronwall, Curtis Sanford, Sami Lepistö and Vitaly Vishnevskiy. Vishnevskiy previously played for the club from 2008 to 2010. Defenseman Dmitri Kulikov signed on to play with Lokomotiv during the NHL lockout.

== Season-by-season record ==
Note: GP = Games played, W = Wins, L = Losses, OTL = Overtime/shootout losses, Pts = Points, GF = Goals for, GA = Goals against

Season	GP	W	L	OTL	Pts	GF	GA	Finish	Top Scorer	Playoffs
2008–09	56	32	13	3	111	174	111	1st, Kharlamov	Alexei Yashin (47 points: 21 G, 26 A; 56 GP)	Lost in Gagarin Cup Finals, 3–4 (Ak Bars Kazan)
2009–10	56	26	17	4	96	163	132	3rd, Tarasov	Josef Vašíček (48 points: 21 G, 27 A; 56 GP)	Lost in Conference Finals, 3–4 (HC MVD)
2010–11	54	33	14	1	108	202	143	1st, Tarasov	Pavol Demitra (60 points: 18 G, 42 A; 54 GP)	Lost in Conference Finals, 2–4 (Atlant Moscow Oblast)
2011–12	22	13	6	1	42	68	47	3rd, Western	Oleg Yashin (15 points: 9 G, 6 A; 22 GP)	Lost in Conference Semifinals, 2–3 (Dizel Penza)
2012–13	52	24	18	0	92	131	121	2nd, Tarasov	Sergei Plotnikov (33 points: 15 G, 18 A; 55 GP)	Lost in Conference Quarterfinals, 2–4 (Severstal Cherepovets)
2013–14	54	28	21	5	84	109	103	3rd, Tarasov	Sergei Plotnikov (35 points: 15 G, 20 A; 53 GP)	Lost in Conference Finals, 1–4 (Lev Praha)
2014–15	60	32	19	9	97	155	143	3rd, Tarasov	Yegor Averin (37 points: 16 G, 21 A; 59 GP)	Lost in Conference Quarterfinals, 2–4 (Dynamo Moscow)
2015–16	60	43	15	2	125	155	94	2nd, Tarasov	Daniil Apalkov (43 points: 16 G, 27 A; 59 GP)	Lost in Conference Quarterfinals, 1–4 (SKA Saint Petersburg)
2016–17	60	36	18	6	110	163	130	3rd, Tarasov	Brandon Kozun (56 points: 23 G, 33 A; 59 GP)	Lost in Conference Finals, 0–4 (SKA Saint Petersburg)
2017–18	56	35	18	3	99	148	129	2nd, Tarasov	Staffan Kronwall (35 points: 10 G, 25 A; 55 GP)	Lost in Conference Semifinals, 1–4 (SKA Saint Petersburg)
2018–19	62	40	16	6	86	159	118	2nd, Tarasov	Brandon Kozun (41 points: 19 G, 22 A; 52 GP)	Lost in Conference Semifinals, 1–4 (SKA Saint Petersburg)
2019–20	62	34	23	5	73	170	151	2nd, Tarasov	Denis Alexeyev (37 points: 6 G, 31 A; 57 GP)	Lost in Conference Quarterfinals, 2–4 (Jokerit)
2020–21	60	38	15	7	83	181	126	3rd, Tarasov	Pavel Kraskovsky (38 points: 17 G, 21 A; 56 GP)	Lost in Conference Semifinals, 3–4 (CSKA Moscow)
2021–22	47	23	15	9	55	113	103	4th, Tarasov	Reid Boucher (27 points: 12 G, 15 A; 46 GP)	Lost in Conference Quarterfinals, 0–4 (CSKA Moscow)
2022–23	68	41	17	10	92	164	122	2nd, Tarasov	Maxim Shalunov (42 points: 29 G, 13 A; 62 GP)	Lost in Conference Semifinals, 3–4 (CSKA Moscow)
2023–24	68	44	19	5	93	174	139	2nd, Tarasov	Maxim Shalunov (36 points: 17 G, 19 A; 68 GP)	Lost in Gagarin Cup Finals, 0–4 (Metallurg Magnitogorsk)
2024–25	68	49	15	4	102	191	122	1st, Tarasov	Artur Kayumov (45 points: 22 G, 23 A; 63 GP)	Gagarin Cup Champions, 4–1 (Traktor Chelyabinsk)
2025–26	68	46	16	6	98	185	135	1st, Tarasov	Alexander Radulov (52 points: 21 G, 31 A; 64 GP)	Gagarin Cup Champions, 4–2 (Ak Bars Kazan)

== Players ==
=== Current roster ===
Updated 18 August 2025.

No.	Nat	Player	Pos	S/G	Age	Acquired	Birthplace
91	(Russia)	Denis Alexeyev	C	R	28	2017	Gubkin, Russia
5	(Russia)	Alexei Bereglazov	D	L	32	2023	Magnitogorsk, Russia
72	(Russia)	Maxim Beryozkin	RW	R	24	2019	Chita, Russia
73	(Russia)	Nikita Cherepanov	D	L	30	2016	Yaroslavl, Russia
51	(Canada)	Byron Froese	C	R	35	2024	Winkler, Manitoba, Canada
28	(Slovakia)	Martin Gernat	D	L	33	2023	Košice, Slovakia
81	(Canada)	Mac Hollowell	D	R	27	2025	Niagara Falls, Ontario, Canada
92	(Russia)	Daniil Isayev	G	L	26	2018	Yaroslavl, Russia
10	(Russia)	Georgi Ivanov	C	L	27	2017	Yaroslavl, Russia
16	(Russia)	Artur Kayumov	LW	L	28	2016	Podgorny, Russia
7	(Russia)	Nikita Kiryanov	C	L	24	2023	Perm, Russia
63	(Russia)	Pavel Kraskovsky (A)	C	L	29	2013	Yaroslavl, Russia
32	(Russia)	Yaroslav Likhachyov	LW	R	24	2022	Yaroslavl, Russia
38	(Russia)	Alexei Melnichuk	G	L	28	2023	Saint Petersburg, Russia
93	(Russia)	Daniil Misyul	D	L	25	2025	Minsk, Belarus
9	(Russia)	Ilya Nikolayev	C	L	25	2024	Yaroslavl, Russia
13	(Russia)	Stepan Nikulin	LW	R	25	2021	Yaroslavl, Russia
90	(Russia)	Alexander Polunin	LW	R	29	2021	Moscow, Russia
47	(Russia)	Alexander Radulov	RW	L	40	2024	Nizhny Tagil, Russian SFSR
87	(Russia)	Rushan Rafikov (A)	D	L	31	2015	Saratov, Russia
99	(Russia)	Andrei Sergeyev	D	R	35	2022	Simferopol , Ukrainian SSR
78	(Russia)	Maxim Shalunov	C	L	33	2021	Chelyabinsk, Russia
70	(Russia)	Yegor Surin	C	L	19	2023	Voronezh, Russia
89	(Russia)	Daniil Tesanov	C	R	24	2020	Yaroslavl, Russia
49	(Russia)	Mark Ulyev	D	L	21	2023	Rybinsk, Russia
97	(Russia)	Alexander Volkov	C	L	23	2022	Lyubertsy, Russia
4	(Russia)	Alexander Yelesin (C)	D	R	30	2021	Yaroslavl, Russia

== Honors ==
=== Champions ===
(gold) Gagarin Cup (2): 2025, 2026
(gold) Russian Superleague (3): 1997, 2002, 2003
(gold) Opening Cup (2): 2024–25, 2025–26
(gold) Continental Cup (1): 2024–25
(gold) Minsk Cup (1): 2017
(gold) Longi Kahoo Cup (3): 2010, 2011, 2017
(gold) Junior tournament President Cup (Trinec) (1): 2016/2017

=== Runners-up ===
(silver) Gagarin Cup (2): 2009, 2024
(bronze) Gagarin Cup (3): 2010, 2014, 2017
(silver) Russian Superleague (1): 2008
(bronze) Russian Superleague (2): 1999, 2005
(silver) IIHF Continental Cup (1): 2003
(bronze) Spengler Cup (1): 2003
