= 2011 in Europe =

This is a list of 2011 events that occurred in Europe.

== Incumbents ==
=== Albania ===
(Albania)

=== Andorra ===
(Andorra)

=== Azerbaijan ===
(Azerbaijan)

=== Belarus ===
(Belarus)

=== Belgium ===
(Belgium)

=== Bosnia and Herzegovina ===
(Bosnia and Herzegovina)

=== Bulgaria ===
(Bulgaria)

=== Croatia ===
(Croatia)

=== Czech Republic ===
(Czech Republic)

=== Cyprus ===
(Cyprus)

=== Denmark ===
(Denmark)

=== Estonia ===
(Estonia)

=== European Union ===
- President of the European Commission: José Manuel Barroso
- President of the Parliament: Jerzy Buzek
- President of the European Council: Herman Van Rompuy
- Presidency of the Council of the EU:
  - Hungary (January–July)
  - Poland (July–December)

=== Finland ===
(Finland)

=== France ===
(France)

=== Germany ===
(Germany)

=== Georgia ===
(Georgia (country))

=== Greece ===
(Greece)

=== Hungary ===
(Hungary)

=== Iceland ===
(Iceland)

=== Ireland ===
(Republic of Ireland)

=== Italy ===
(Italy)

=== Latvia ===
(Latvia)

=== Liechtenstein ===
(Liechtenstein)

=== Lithuania ===
(Lithuania)

=== Luxembourg ===
(Luxembourg)

=== Malta ===
(Malta)

=== Moldova ===
(Moldova)

=== Monaco ===
(Monaco)

=== Montenegro ===
(Montenegro)

=== Netherlands ===
(Netherlands)

=== North Macedonia ===
(North Macedonia)

=== Norway ===
(Norway)

=== Poland ===
(Poland)

=== Portugal ===
(Portugal)

=== Romania ===
(Romania)

=== Russia ===
(Russia)

=== San Marino ===
(San Marino)

=== Serbia ===
(Serbia)

=== Slovakia ===
(Slovakia)

=== Slovenia ===
(Slovenia)

=== Spain ===
(Spain)

=== Sweden ===
(Sweden)

=== Switzerland ===
(Switzerland)

=== Turkey ===
(Turkey)

=== Ukraine ===
(Ukraine)

=== United Kingdom ===
(United Kingdom)

=== Vatican City ===
(Vatican City)

== Events ==
=== January ===
- January 1: Estonia officially adopts the euro currency and becomes the seventeenth eurozone country.
- January 21: Three people have been killed in the Albanian capital of Tirana during clashes between police and thousands of opposition supporters.
- January 24: 37 people were killed and more than 180 others wounded in a suicide bombing at Domodedovo International Airport in Moscow, Russia.
- January 29: At least 10 people were reported to have died in a train crash in eastern Germany.

=== March ===
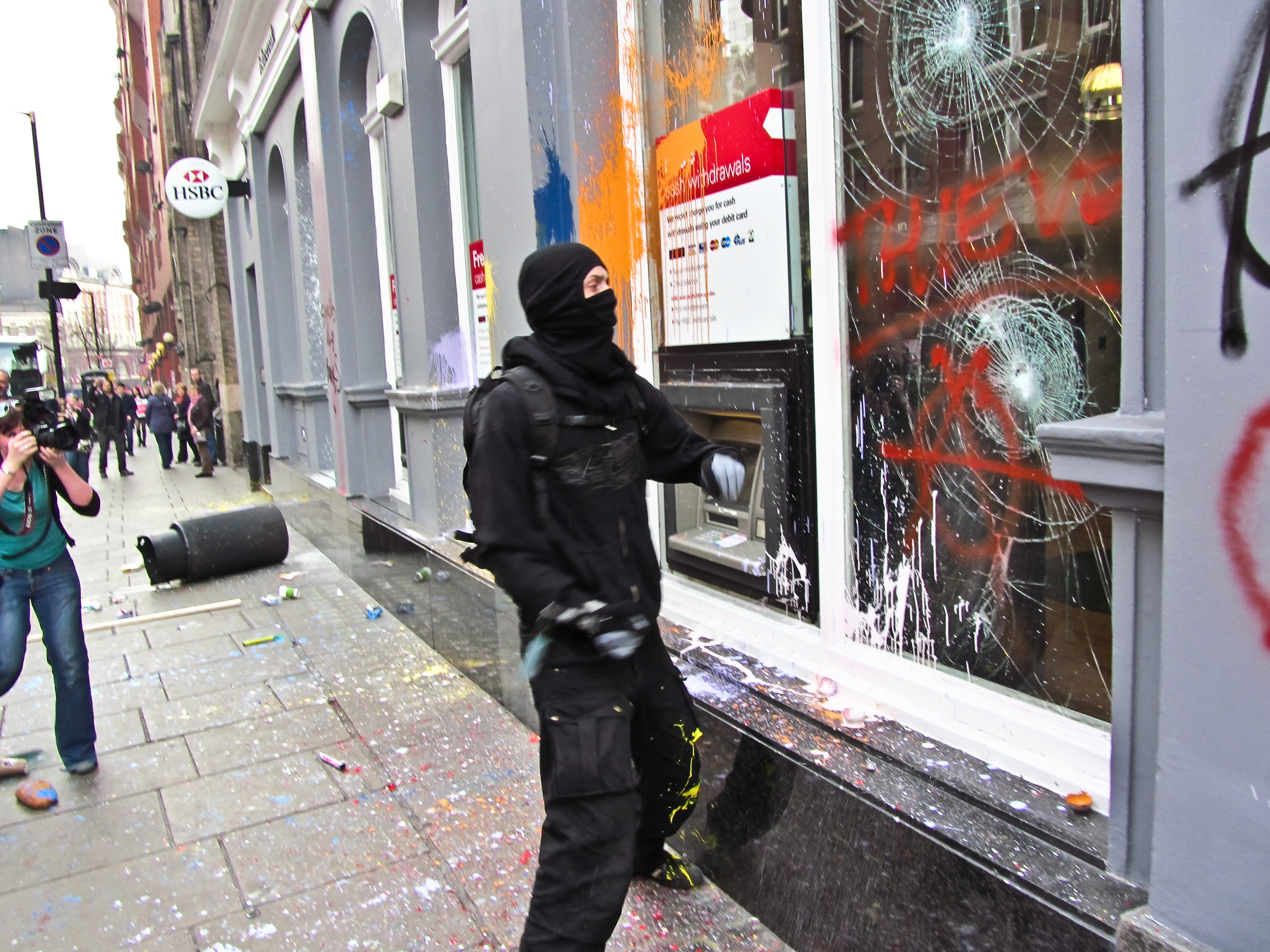
A protester smashing the window of a branch of the HSBC bank in Cambridge Circus, London.

- March 26: At least 138 people were detained in a large protest march against planned public spending cuts by the Conservative-Liberal Democrat coalition government in the city of London.

=== April ===
- April 8: Due to very low visibility in a sandstorm, 80 cars piled up in a mass crash on German Autobahn 19. 30 of these caught fire, resulting in the death of eight people and the injury of 131 others.
- April 29: An estimated two billion people watched the wedding of Prince William, Duke of Cambridge and Catherine Middleton at Westminster Abbey in London.

=== May ===
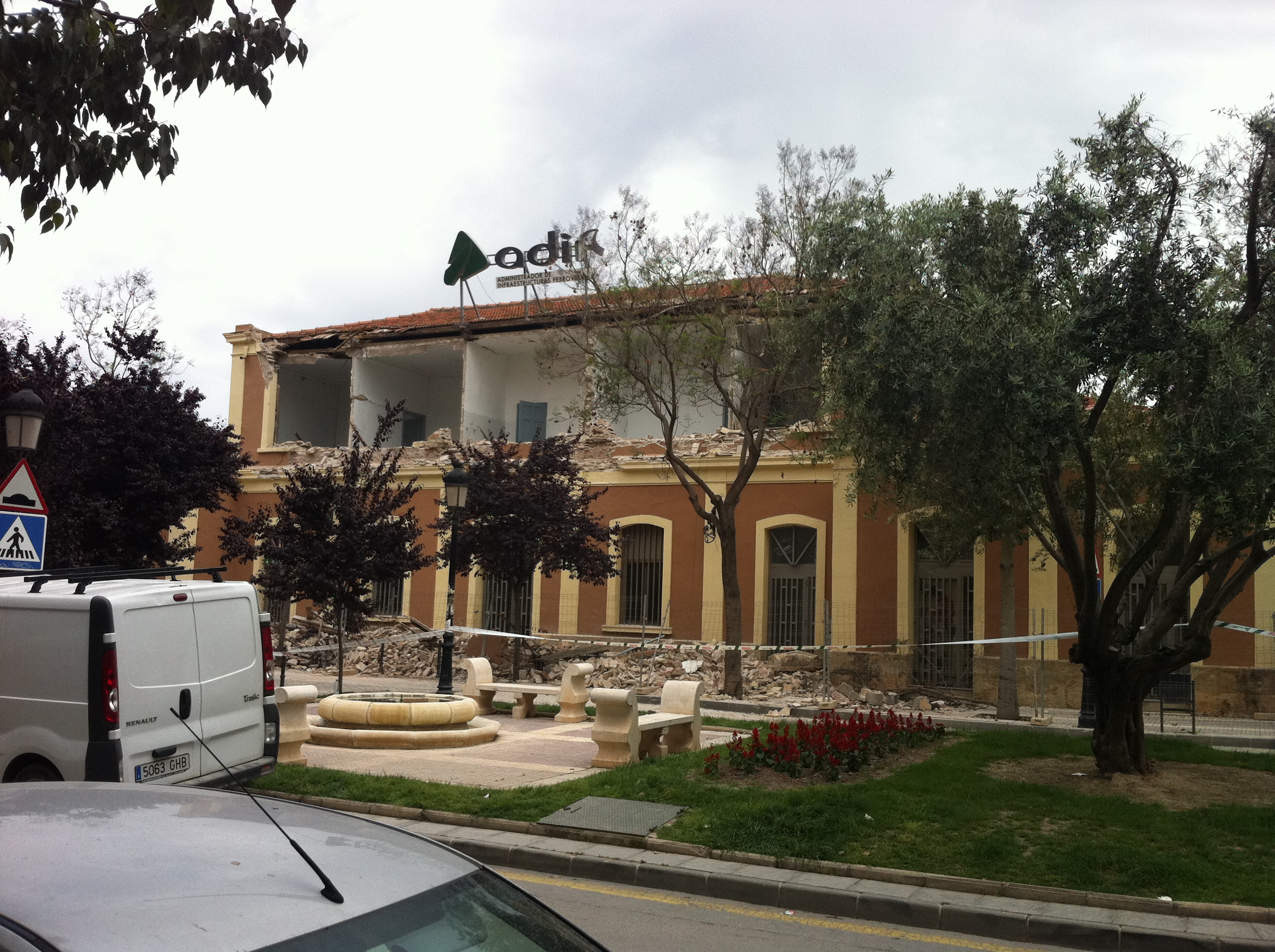
The Lorca-Sutullena railway station was seriously damaged in May earthquake.

- May 11: A magnitudine 5.1 earthquake struck the Region of Murcia, Spain, causing significant damage in the city of Lorca. 10 people were reported dead.
- May 16: The European Union agreed to €78 billion rescue deal for Portugal. The bailout loan will be equally split between the European Financial Stabilisation Mechanism, the European Financial Stability Facility, and the International Monetary Fund.
- May 21: Two people have been killed and twenty others were seriously injured in a series of anti-government protests held in the Georgian capital of Tbilisi.
- May 22: Hundreds of flights were cancelled as a result of the eruption of Grímsvötn volcano.
- May 26
  - Three young Russian women have died and another twenty citizens were hospitalized after drinking poisoned alcohol on a yacht in Turkey.
  - Ratko Mladić, the war crimes fugitive accused of orchestrating the Siege of Sarajevo and the Srebrenica massacre, has been arrested in Serbia.
- May 27: Riot police clashed with protesters as authorities cleared away a makeshift camp in Plaça de Catalunya, Barcelona, set up as part of a Spain-wide demonstration against the country's precarious economic conditions. At least 121 people were lightly injured.

=== June ===
- June 2: Four people have been killed in a major explosion at an oil refinery in south-west Wales.
- June 20: More than 300 people were injured in a sectarian interface near a Catholic enclave in east Belfast.
- June 21: 44 people have died in a plane crash in north-west Russia.

=== July ===
- July 10: At least 122 people have died when a passenger ship sank with more than 200 people aboard on Russia's Volga River.
- July 20: Goran Hadžić is detained in Serbia, becoming the last of 161 people indicted by the International Criminal Tribunal for the former Yugoslavia.
- July 22: Anders Behring Breivik kills 77 people in twin terrorist attacks in Norway after a bombing in the Regjeringskvartalet government center in Oslo and a shooting at a political youth camp on the island of Utøya.
- July 29: At least 17 people were killed and 11 injured in an explosion in Suhodolskaya-Vostochnaya coal mine, Ukraine. A short time after the explosion, an elevator collapsed at the Bazhanova coal mine, in the industrial city of Makiivka. According to local authorities, two miners were killed and three others were injured.

=== August ===
- August 6–11: Riots and looting initially breakout in London but spread to other English cities. The initial riot occurred after a peaceful protest in Tottenham, north London over the fatal police shooting of Mark Duggan, which later turned violent. The aftermath saw over 3000 arrests made, consisting of individuals involved in rioting, looting, arson and other related criminal activity, 5 people killed and 186 police officers injured.
- August 9: A Russian cargo plane has crashed in a remote far eastern area, with all 11 people on board believed to have been killed.
- August 12: A passenger train has crashed in central Poland, killing one passenger and injuring at least 81.

=== September ===
- September 7: At least 45 people died when a plane carrying the Lokomotiv Yaroslavl ice hockey team crashed during take-off.
- September 15: Four miners died after the Gleision Colliery was flooded by the waters of River Tawe due to an explosion.
- September 26: Two people have been killed and six others injured in ethnic clashes in the Bulgarian city of Plovdiv.

=== October ===
- October 15: A protest took place in Rome, Italy, to protest against economic inequality and the influence of the European Commission, the European Central Bank, the International Monetary Fund on politics and also against the government of Silvio Berlusconi. The protest turned into a violent demonstration, resulting in the injury of 135 people and the arresting of 13 others.
- October 20: Basque separatist militant organisation ETA declared an end to its 43-year campaign of political violence, which has killed over 800 people since 1968.
- October 23: At least 604 people were killed and more than 4,152 injured in a magnitude 7.1 earthquake, near the city of Van, Turkey.
- October 24: 17 people died in Western European unprecedented floods, caused by low-pressure area Meeno.
- October 27: After an emergency meeting in Brussels, the European Union announced an agreement to tackle the European sovereign debt crisis which includes a writedown of 50% of Greek bonds, a recapitalisation of European banks and an increase of the bailout fund of the European Financial Stability Facility totaling to €1 trillion.

=== November ===
- November 4: Seven people have been killed and 51 injured in a 34-vehicle pile-up on the M5 motorway in Somerset.
- November 9: A magnitude 5.7 earthquake struck south-west of Van, causing the death of over 12 people in the collapse of several hotels.

=== December ===
- December 18: A jack-up rig capsized and sank in the Sea of Okhotsk with the loss of 53 of its 67 crew.

== Architecture ==
- March 29: London Olympic Stadium, designed by Populous, is completed.
- May 5: Tour First, previously known as Tour AXA, becomes the tallest building in France, with a total height of 231 m.
- June 20: Glasgow Riverside Museum, designed by Zaha Hadid Architects, opens as the new development of the Museum of Transport.
- July 27: London Aquatics Centre, designed by Zaha Hadid, is completed.
- October 28: ArcelorMittal Orbit, designed by Anish Kapoor with Cecil Balmond, erected at Olympic Park, London.

== Arts and entertainment ==
- January 15–January 18: Milan Fashion Week
- January 19–January 23: Paris Fashion Week
- February 10–February 20: 61st Berlin International Film Festival
- February 18–February 23: London Fashion Week
- May 11–May 22: 64th Cannes Film Festival
- May 14: Eldar & Nigar, the representatives of Azerbaijan, won the 56th annual Eurovision Song Contest, with their single "Running Scared".
- August 31–September 10: 68th Venice International Film Festival
- September 17–October 3: Oktoberfest
- October 12–October 27: 55th BFI London Film Festival

== Deaths ==
=== January ===
- January 2: Pete Postlethwaite, 64, English stage, film and television actor. (born 1946)
- January 4: Gerry Rafferty, 63, Scottish singer and songwriter. (born 1947)
- January 15
  - Nat Lofthouse, 85, English professional footballer. (born 1925)
  - Susannah York, 72, English film, stage and television actress. (born 1939)
- January 24: Bernd Eichinger, 61, German film producer and director. (born 1949)
- January 30: John Barry, 77, English conductor and composer of film music. (born 1933)

=== February ===
- February 3: Maria Schneider, 58, French actress. (born 1952)
- February 5: Brian Jacques, 71, English author. (born 1939)
- February 6: Gary Moore, 58, Northern Irish musician. (born 1952)
- February 8: Cesare Rubini, 87, Italian basketball player and coach, and water polo player. (born 1923)
- February 14: George Shearing, 91, British-born American jazz pianist. (born 1919)
- February 27: Necmettin Erbakan, 84, 25th Prime Minister of Turkey (born 1926)

=== March ===
- March 4: Simon van der Meer, 85, Dutch Nobel physicist. (born 1925)
- March 6: Ján Popluhár, 75, Slovak footballer. (born 1935)
- March 17: Michael Gough, 94, English character actor. (born 1916)
- March 21: Nikolai Andrianov, 58, Russian gymnast. (born 1952)
- March 23
  - Elizabeth Taylor, 79, British-born American actress. (born 1932)
  - Teodor Negoiţă, 63, Romanian polar region explorer. (born 1947)
- March 26
  - Paul Baran, 84, Polish-born American computer engineer. (born 1926)
  - Diana Wynne Jones, 76, British writer. (born 1934)

=== April ===
- April 19: Grete Waitz, 57, Norwegian marathon runner. (born 1953)

=== May ===
- May 7: Seve Ballesteros, 54, Spanish professional golfer. (born 1957)
- May 19: Garret FitzGerald, 85, 7th Taoiseach of Ireland. (born 1926)
- May 24: Fănuș Neagu, 79, Romanian author and memoirist. (born 1932)
- May 29
  - Sergei Bagapsh, 62, 2nd President of the Republic of Abkhazia. (born 1949)
  - Ferenc Mádl, 80, 2nd President of Hungary. (born 1931)

=== June ===
- June 7: Jorge Semprún, 87, Spanish writer and politician. (born 1923)
- June 10: Patrick Leigh Fermor, 96, British author, scholar and soldier. (born 1915)

=== July ===
- July 4: Archduke Otto of Austria, 98. (born 1912)
- July 10: Roland Petit, 87, French choreographer and dancer. (born 1924)
- July 20: Lucian Freud, 88, German-born British painter. (born 1922)
- July 23: Amy Winehouse, 27, English singer and songwriter. (born 1983)
- July 25: Michael Cacoyannis, 89, Greek Cypriot filmmaker. (born 1922)

=== August ===
- August 7
  - Harri Holkeri, 74, 57th Prime Minister of Finland. (born 1937)
  - Nancy Wake, 98, New Zealand-born French Resistance fighter. (born 1912)
- August 16: Andrej Bajuk, 67, 3rd Prime Minister of the Republic of Slovenia. (born 1943)
- August 31: Valery Rozhdestvensky, 72, Russian cosmonaut. (born 1939)

=== September ===
- September 7 – Victims of the 2011 Lokomotiv Yaroslavi air disaster
  - Vitaly Anikeyenko, 24, Ukrainian-Russian hockey player. (born 1987)
  - Mikhail Balandin, 31, Russian hockey player. (born 1980)
  - Gennady Churilov, 24, Russian hockey player. (born 1987)
  - Pavol Demitra, 36, Slovak hockey player. (born 1974)
  - Robert Dietrich, 25, Kazakhstani-German hocker player. (born 1986)
  - Marat Kalimulin, 23, Russian hockey player. (born 1988)
  - Alexander Kalyanin, 23, Russian hockey player. (born 1987)
  - Alexander Karpovtsev, 41, Russian hockey player. (born 1970)
  - Andrei Kiryukhin, 24, Russian hockey player. (born 1987)
  - Nikita Klyukin, 21, Russian hockey player. (born 1989)
  - Igor Korolev, 41, Russian hockey player. (born 1970)
  - Stefan Liv, 30, Polish-born Swedish hockey player. (born 1980)
  - Jan Marek, 31, Czech hockey player. (born 1979)
  - Sergei Ostapchuk, 21, Belarusian hockey player. (born 1990)
  - Karel Rachunek, 32, Czech hockey player. (born 1979)
  - Ruslan Salei, 36, Belarusian hockey player. (born 1974)
  - Maxim Shuvalov, 18, Russian hockey player. (born 1993)
  - Kārlis Skrastiņš, 37, Latvian hockey player. (born 1974)
  - Pavel Snurnitsyn, 19, Russian hockey player. (born 1992)
  - Daniil Sobchenko, 20, Ukrainian-Russian hockey player. (born 1991)
  - Ivan Tkachenko, 31, Russian hockey player. (born 1979)
  - Pavel Trakhanov, 33, Russian hockey player. (born 1978)
  - Yuri Urychev, 20, Russian hockey player. (born 1991)
  - Josef Vasicek, 30, Czech hockey player. (born 1980)
  - Alexander Vasyunov, 23, Russian hockey player. (born 1988)
  - Alexander Vyukhin, 38, Ukrainian-Russian hockey player. (born 1973)
  - Artem Yarchuk, 21, Russian hockey player. (born 1990)
- September 11: Andy Whitfield, 39, Welsh Australian actor and model. (born 1972)
- September 12: Alexander Galimov, 26, Russian hockey player. (born 1985)
- September 13: Richard Hamilton, 89, British painter and collage artist. (born 1922)
- September 14: Rudolf Mössbauer, 82, German Nobel physicist. (born 1929)
- September 19: Johnny Răducanu, 79, Romanian jazz pianist. (born 1931)
- September 27: Imre Makovecz, 75, Hungarian architect. (born 1935)

=== October ===
- October 1: Sven Tumba, 80, Swedish ice hockey player. (born 1931)
- October 7: Ramiz Alia, 85, 1st President of Albania. (born 1925)
- October 16: Dan Wheldon, 33, English racing driver. (born 1978)
- October 23: Marco Simoncelli, 24, Italian professional motorcycle racer. (born 1987)
- October 29: Jimmy Savile, 84, English DJ, television presenter, media personality and charity fundraiser. (born 1926)
- October 31: Flórián Albert, 70, Hungarian international footballer. (born 1941)

=== November ===
- November 8: Valentin Ivanov, 76, Russian footballer. (born 1934)
- November 22: Princess Elisabeth, Duchess of Hohenberg, 88. (born 1922)
- November 25: Vasily Alekseyev, 69, Russian weightlifter. (born 1942)
- November 27
  - Ken Russell, 84, English film director. (born 1927)
  - Gary Speed, 42, Welsh footballer and manager. (born 1969)
- November 28: Ante Marković, 87, 9th Prime Minister of SFR Yugoslavia. (born 1924)

=== December ===
- December 1: Christa Wolf, 82, German literary critic, novelist, and essayist. (born 1929)
- December 5: Violetta Villas, 73, Belgian-born Polish singer and actress. (born 1938)
- December 15: Christopher Hitchens, 62, British American author and journalist. (born 1949)
- December 18: Václav Havel, 75, Czech playwright, 10th President of Czechoslovakia and 1st President of the Czech Republic. (born 1936)
- December 24: Johannes Heesters, 108, Dutch actor, singer and entertainer. (born 1903)

== See also ==
- 2011 in the European Union
- List of state leaders in 2011 § Europe
