= List of ice hockey players who died during their careers =

This is a list of ice hockey players who died during their playing careers.

== Player deaths ==
=== Before 1930 ===
Age	Player	Nationality	Date of death	Cause of death	Notes
28	Fred Higginbotham	Canada	September 7, 1896	horse riding accident	Member of the Winnipeg Victorias; won Stanley Cup in February 1896 in a challenge match against the Montreal Victorias.
24	Frank O'Dwyer	United States	June 5, 1901	hit by train	Member of the Columbia ice hockey team.
20	Frank Falvey	United States	January 14, 1903	acute peritonitis	Member of the MIT men's ice hockey team and club president.
24	James A. McGee	Canada	May 15, 1904	horse riding accident	Member of the Ottawa Silver Seven, captain of the Ottawa Rough Riders; brother of Frank McGee.
23	Archie Hooper	Canada	October 11, 1904	complications from on-ice injury	Member of 1902 and 1903 Montreal Hockey Club Stanley Cup champions.
24	Alcide Laurin	Canada	February 24, 1905	on-ice head injury	He received what The Ottawa Journal claimed on February 25, 1905, was an accidental stick blow to the head by 19-year-old Allan Loney, a player on a rival team from Maxville, Ontario.
22	Owen McCourt	Canada	March 7, 1907	on-ice head injury	Murder charges were laid against other players in game in Cornwall, Ontario. There were no convictions.
28	Hod Stuart	Canada	June 23, 1907	open water diving accident	Member of Montreal Wanderers, Stanley Cup champion in 1906 and 1907. All-star benefit game held for family. Member of the Hockey Hall of Fame.
28	Edgar Dey	Canada	February 13, 1912	on-ice chest injury	Stanley Cup winner with Ottawa Senators in 1909.
23	Del Irvine	Canada	April 13, 1916	pneumonia	Played professionally for Portland Rosebuds. PCHA champion in 1916.
32	Hamby Shore	Canada	October 13, 1918	influenza	Played nine seasons for the Ottawa Senators, likely the first-ever NHL player death.
23	Chester Tutein	United States	November 17, 1918	plane crash	Played three seasons for MIT. Enlisted in the United States Army Air Service after his junior year.
37	Joe Hall	Canada	April 5, 1919	Spanish flu	Member of Montreal Canadiens and former long-time member of Quebec Bulldogs. Led NHL in penalty minutes in both seasons played. Had played professionally since 1906. Died during 1919 Stanley Cup Final. Member of the Hockey Hall of Fame.
21	Lewis Norrie	USA	September 23, 1923	car accident	Member of Princeton's ice hockey team.
22	Foley Martin	Canada	December 9, 1923	blood poisoning	Played two seasons in the Western Canada Hockey League from 1921 to 1923 with the Calgary Tigers. Died during opening road trip to start 1923–24 WCHL season.
19	Harold Rees Jr.	USA	January 13, 1924	Cerebral blood clot due to an on-ice injury	Member of Princeton's freshman ice hockey team.
34	Jack Darragh	Canada	June 28, 1924	ruptured appendix	Played thirteen seasons for the Ottawa Senators. Member of the Hockey Hall of Fame.
20	Francis Van Valkenberg	USA	June 27, 1925	car accident	Member of St. Thomas's ice hockey team. Died when the car he was a passenger in was sideswiped by a streetcar in Superior, Wisconsin.
39	Georges Vézina	Canada	March 27, 1926	tuberculosis	Played sixteen seasons with the Montreal Canadiens from 1910–11 to 1925–26 winning the Stanley Cup twice, Member of the Hockey Hall of Fame, and namesake of the National Hockey League's Vezina Trophy. On November 28, 1925, the Canadiens' first game of the 1925–26 season, Vezina ran a temperature of 102°. He collapsed in the crease during the second period, never again returned to play, and died on the last day of that NHL season.
26	Edward Baker	Canada	January 10, 1929	on-ice skull fracture	Played two professional seasons, in Hamilton (Can-Pro) and Niagara (IHL). Collided with a teammate and left the ice unassisted. He checked into a nearby hospital, where he died the following morning.
25	George Horne	Canada	July 31, 1929	drowning	Played three seasons in the NHL from 1925 to 1929 with the Montreal Maroons and Toronto Maple Leafs. Stanley Cup champion in 1926. Drowned while attempting to swim to shore during a sudden storm that capsized his boat; two friends and a local guide survived.
25	Harry Heintzman	Canada	August 21, 1929	complications from throat surgery	Three year player for Clarkson. Elected team captain at the conclusion of his third season.

=== 1930–1969 ===
Age	Player	Nationality	Date of death	Cause of death	Notes
26	Bobby Connors	Great Britain	July 27, 1931	diving accident	Played three seasons and 78 games in the NHL from 1926 to 1929–30 for the New York Americans and Detroit Cougars.
20	Fred Knapp	United States	November 30, 1933	suicide	Played for Union in 1932–33.
29	Charlie Gardiner	Canada	June 13, 1934	brain hemorrhage	Goaltender for the Chicago Black Hawks for seven seasons from 1926–27 until 1933–34, the year they won the Stanley Cup; Gardiner was a multiple award winner, winning the Vezina Trophy twice, and is a member of the Hockey Hall of Fame.
24	Jack "Newsy" Leswick	Canada	August 7, 1934	drowning	Played 37 games for the Chicago Black Hawks in 1933–34. Body found in the Assiniboine River without his wallet or other valuables. Stanley Cup champion in 1934.
30	Earl Miller	Canada	June 20, 1936	unknown	Played five seasons and 109 games for the Chicago Black Hawks and Toronto Maple Leafs from 1927–28 to 1931–32. Stanley Cup champion in 1932.
34	Howie Morenz	Canada	March 8, 1937	complications from leg injury	Played 14 seasons and 550 games in the National Hockey League, most notably with the Montreal Canadiens, from 1923–24 to 1936–37; generally regarded as the best player of his era, he won two scoring championships, three Hart Trophies and three Stanley Cup championships; The Canadiens retired his number 7; member of the Hockey Hall of Fame.
24	Russell McConnell	Canada	September 7, 1942	World War II casualty	Played four championship seasons with McGill University; most valuable player of Quebec Senior Hockey League in 1938–39. Turned down pro offers from New York Rangers to serve in Royal Canadian Navy.
24	Norbert Sterle	United States	November 19, 1943	World War II casualty	Played one season at Illinois, led program to an Intercollegiate championship.
31	Don Deacon	Canada	December 25, 1943	fall from balcony	Played three seasons and 30 games for the Detroit Red Wings from 1936 to 1940.
34	Ladislav Troják	Czechoslovakia	November 8, 1948	plane crash	Played for LTC Praha from 1934 to 1948.
23	Harijs Mellups	Soviet Union	January 7, 1950	plane crash	Mellups was the starting goaltender of the first-ever Soviet national team game. Played several seasons in the Soviet League for VVS Moscow, which lost 11 players in the 1950 Sverdlovsk plane crash.
27	Roberts Šūlmanis	Soviet Union	January 7, 1950	plane crash	Played several seasons in the Soviet League for Dinamo Riga. Joined VVS Moscow in 1949.
24	Ivan Novikov	Soviet Union	January 7, 1950	plane crash	1947 Soviet Championship bronze medal winner. 1948 Soviet Championship silver medal winner.
30	Boris Bocharnikov	Soviet Union	January 7, 1950	plane crash	1947 Soviet Championship gold medal winner. 1948 Soviet Championship bronze medal winner.
33	Zdenek Zigmund	Soviet Union	January 7, 1950	plane crash	1947 Soviet Championship bronze medal winner. 1948 Soviet Championship silver medal winner.
27	Yuri Tarasov	Soviet Union	January 7, 1950	plane crash	Brother of hall of fame player Anatoli Tarasov.
	Vasily Volodin	Soviet Union	January 7, 1950	plane crash	
	Eugeny Voronin	Soviet Union	January 7, 1950	plane crash	
28	Yuri Zhiburtovich	Soviet Union	January 7, 1950	plane crash	
	Victor Isaev	Soviet Union	January 7, 1950	plane crash	
	Alexander Moiseev	Soviet Union	January 7, 1950	plane crash	
30	Johnny Holota	Canada	March 10, 1951	car crash	Played two seasons and 15 games in the NHL from 1942 to 1946 for the Detroit Red Wings.
24	Bill Barilko	Canada	August 26, 1951	plane crash	His plane crashed in 1951 but investigators did not find the crash until 1962. Played five seasons and won the Stanley Cup four times with the Toronto Maple Leafs from 1947 to 1951, and scored the legendary cup-winning goal in overtime of game five in the 1951 finals; the Leafs retired his number 5. Inspired the song "Fifty Mission Cap" by The Tragically Hip.
26	Ross Lowe	Canada	August 8, 1955	drowning	Played three seasons and 77 games in the NHL from 1949 to 1952 for the Boston Bruins and Montreal Canadiens; Les Cunningham Award recipient as AHL MVP for his performance during 1954–55, his last season.
28	Murray Balfour	Canada	May 30, 1965	lung cancer	Played eight seasons and 306 games in the National Hockey League from 1956–57 to 1964–65 winning the Stanley Cup with the Chicago Black Hawks in 1961; he also played for the Montreal Canadiens and Boston Bruins.
22	Jarmo Wasama	Finland	February 2, 1966	car crash	Five-time all-star defenseman in SM-sarja. In 1995, the trophy of top rookie of SM-liiga was renamed the Jarmo Wasama memorial trophy.
22	Butch Paul	Canada	March 25, 1966	car crash	Played three games for the Detroit Red Wings in 1964–65.
29	Bill Masterton	Canada	January 15, 1968	on-ice head injury	Played 30 games in the 1967–68 NHL season with the Minnesota North Stars and is the only player in NHL history to be killed as a direct result of an on-ice incident; the NHL annually awards the Bill Masterton Trophy in his honour, and the North Stars retired his number 19.
27	Elov Seger	Canada	March 8, 1968	brain tumor	All-American, helped Michigan Tech win a National Championship in 1962.
22	Viktor Blinov	Soviet Union	July 9, 1968	heart failure	Defenceman who played for Spartak Moscow. Champion of USSR (1967), European champion (1968), World champion (1968), champion of Olympic Games (1968). Died during training.
29	Wayne Larkin	Canada	September 13, 1968	coronary thrombosis	Played eight seasons in American Hockey League. Died on the ice during the first practice of the New York Rangers training camp, held in Kitchener, Ontario. Won 1959 Memorial Cup with Winnipeg Braves.
22	Mike Crupi	United States	January 10, 1969	car crash	Defenseman who played two seasons with the Johnstown Jets of the Eastern Hockey League. Crupi passed away after his vehicle lost control and hit a guard rail then a pole. The Mike Crupi Most Determined Player Award is an annual honor presented to a player on the Minnesota Golden Gophers men's ice hockey team.

=== 1970–1989 ===
Age	Player	Nationality	Date of death	Cause of death	Notes
40	Terry Sawchuk	Canada	May 31, 1970	injuries suffered in an off-ice shoving incident	Played 21 seasons and 972 games in the National Hockey League from 1949 to 1970; 14 of those seasons played with the Detroit Red Wings who retired his number 1; set numerous NHL goalie records and won numerous NHL awards; considered by many to be one of the greatest goalies of all time; member of the Hockey Hall of Fame.
20	Janez Kokalj	Yugoslavia	January 24, 1971	injuries suffered after falling from a moving train	Defender played for his home town HK Celje. His team played a match in Belgrade in the afternoon a day early. While returning from the game, he mistakenly opened a main door and was sucked out of the train. He died on the spot as a result of the injuries suffered from the fall near Vinkovci.
21	Michel Brière	Canada	April 13, 1971	car crash	Pittsburgh Penguins rookie played 76 games in 1969–70; the Penguins retired his number 21; the Michel Brière Memorial Trophy is awarded annually by the QMJHL to the league MVP.
28	Lennart Svedberg	Sweden	July 29, 1972	car crash	Represented Sweden in the 1968 Winter Olympics and six IIHF World Championships; in the 1970 World Championships he was named top defenceman
44	Tim Horton	Canada	February 21, 1974	car crash	Played 24 seasons and 1,446 games in the National Hockey League from 1949 to 1974, playing 20 seasons and 1,185 games for the Toronto Maple Leafs; named to the NHL's First and Second All-Star teams three times each; member of the Hockey Hall of Fame. Also founder of the Tim Hortons restaurant chain.
29	Wayne Maki	Canada	May 12, 1974	brain cancer	Played six seasons and 246 games in the National Hockey League, for the Chicago Black Hawks, St. Louis Blues and Vancouver Canucks.
18	Gaétan Paradis	Canada	November 24, 1974	bus crash	Played for the Sherbrooke Castors, of the Quebec Major Junior Hockey League.
24	Bob Gassoff	Canada	May 27, 1977	motorcycle crash	Played four seasons and 245 games for the St. Louis Blues from 1973 to 1977; the Blues retired his number 3.
26	Danijel Kerkoš	Yugoslavia	June 8, 1978	car crash	Forward. Played for HK Celje his entire career and was a member of Yugoslavia's junior national team in his younger years.
30	Veikko Suominen	Finland	December 21, 1978	suicide	Played 331 SM-sarja games for Kiekko-67, Upon Pallo and Ilves. Won one SM-sarja Championship with Ilves in 1972 and played 8 games for Finnish national team.
27	Scott Garland	Canada	June 9, 1979	car crash	Played three seasons and 91 games in the NHL from 1975 to 1979 for the Toronto Maple Leafs and the Los Angeles Kings.
29	Vyacheslav Solodukhin	Soviet Union	December 1979	Suicide by carbon monoxide poisoning	Forward. Played for SKA Saint Petersburg and the Summit Series.
24	Vladislav Najdenov	Soviet Union	1979	murdered, smothering	Forward. Played for HC Spartak Moscow. His murderer was never found.
26	Don Ashby	Canada	May 30, 1981	car crash	Played six seasons in the NHL for the Toronto Maple Leafs, Colorado Rockies, and Edmonton Oilers from 1975 to 1981
33	Valeri Kharlamov	Soviet Union	August 27, 1981	car crash	Played in three Olympics, 11 IIHF World Championships and the 1972 Summit Series. Member of the Hockey Hall of Fame.
28	Rauli Levonen	Finland	December 1, 1981	heart attack	Played 9 seasons in Finnish SM-liiga for Ässät Pori and won championship title in 1978. Father of ex-pro hockey player Jarno Levonen, cousin of ex-player and international referee Jari Levonen. Suffered a heart attack during a 3rd division game and died later at hospital.
30	Konstantin Klimov	Soviet Union	January 8, 1982	car crash	Forward. Played for the national Soviet junior team and HC Spartak Moscow. Champion of USSR (1969, 1974), winner of the USSR Cup (1970,1971,1974), winner of the European Junior Championship (1970).
28	Mikhail Kovalev	Soviet Union	1982	murdered	Defenseman. Played for the national Soviet junior team and HC CSKA Moscow. Winner of the European Junior Championship (1973).
18	Jože Gradišar	Yugoslavia	March 1, 1983	heart attack	Defender for HK Tivoli died only two days after his 18th birthday. While preparing with the junior national team in Sarajevo for the European U18 Group C championship that was due to take place he suddenly collapsed after a morning practice. Despite immediate medical assistance he died on the way to the hospital.
25	Palle Schultz	Denmark	December 1984	injury	Played several seasons in Danish 1. Division and won championship title in 1983 with Herlev IK. Died in December 1984 in Kopenhagen Hospital after he was hit by stick during league game
17	Anatoli Fetisov	Soviet Union	June 1985	car crash	Fetisov was a sure bet to play with the Soviet Union at the 1986 World Junior Ice Hockey Championships in Hamilton and a strong candidate for selection in the 1986 NHL entry draft; his older brother, former NHLer Viacheslav Fetisov, was the driver in the crash.
26	Pelle Lindbergh	Sweden	November 11, 1985	car crash	Philadelphia Flyers goalie played five seasons from 1981 until his death in 1985; Vezina Trophy recipient for 1984–85 NHL season; the Flyers created the Pelle Lindbergh Memorial Trophy and award it annually to the team's most improved player.
18	George Pelawa	United States	August 30, 1986	car crash	Played for Bemidji High School, was the Calgary Flames' first-round pick (16th overall) in the 1986 NHL entry draft. Was named Minnesota Mr. Hockey in 1986 as the top high-school player in the state.
20	Trent Kresse	Canada	December 30, 1986	bus crash	Killed when Swift Current Broncos team bus crashed on the way to a WHL game in Regina. The league awards the Four Broncos Memorial Trophy to its player of the year, partially in their honour.
19	Scott Kruger	Canada	December 30, 1986	bus crash	Killed when Swift Current Broncos team bus crashed on the way to a WHL game in Regina. The league awards the Four Broncos Memorial Trophy to its player of the year, partially in their honour.
20	Chris Mantyka	Canada	December 30, 1986	bus crash	Killed when Swift Current Broncos team bus crashed on the way to a WHL game in Regina. The league awards the Four Broncos Memorial Trophy to its player of the year, partially in their honour.
16	Brent Ruff	Canada	December 30, 1986	bus crash	Killed when Swift Current Broncos team bus crashed on the way to a WHL game in Regina. The league awards the Four Broncos Memorial Trophy to its player of the year, partially in their honour.
27	Andrew Zemko	Soviet Union	July 1988	unknown, supposedly heart attack	Defenseman, played for Torpedo Togliatti during 1985–1988. Died during cross-country run in training camp.
30	Bjørn Skaare	Norway	June 21, 1989	car accident	One game in the NHL for the Detroit Red Wings. First Norwegian to play in the NHL.
18	Neil Carnes	United States	July 30, 1989	motorcycle crash	Neil Carnes played in the QMJHL from 1986 to 1987 through 1988–89 with the Verdun Junior Canadiens and the Laval Titan. Drafted in the 3rd round (46th overall) by the Montreal Canadiens in the 1988 NHL entry draft, Carnes died in a motorcycle accident in his hometown of Plymouth, Michigan shortly after playing in the 1989 Memorial Cup with Laval. Neil scored 79 goals and had 145 assists for a total of 224 points in 164 career QMJHL games.
23	Duncan MacPherson	Canada	August 9, 1989	Hit by snow grooming machine, then buried	Drafted 20th overall in the 1984 NHL entry draft by the New York Islanders. Frozen body found in a glacier in Austria in 2003.

=== 1990–1999 ===
Age	Player	Nationality	Date of death	Cause of death	Notes
18	Kirill Tarasov	Soviet Union	1990	car crash	Candidate for the Soviet National Junior team. Vyacheslav Kozlov, then the top junior player in the country who would go on to play 18 years in the NHL, was seriously injured in the same accident.
26	Luděk Čajka	Czechoslovakia	February 14, 1990	on-ice spinal injury	Played in the Czechoslovak Extraliga. Chosen 115th overall in the 1987 NHL entry draft by the New York Rangers. His death led to installation of no-touch icing in Europe.
34	Vladimir Durdin	Soviet Union	May 27, 1990	car crash	Played 11 seasons for Dynamo Riga in the Soviet Championship League and one season for Ässät Pori in the Finnish first division. Member of 1978 Soviet All-Stars squad that played exhibition games against WHA teams. Father of Sergei Durdin, who later played in the United Hockey League.
19	Miran Schrott	Italy	January 14, 1992	cardiac arrest following on-ice slash	Played for HC Gardena in Italy's Serie B league. Jimmy Boni, the player who slashed him, was charged with culpable homicide in his death but later pleaded guilty to manslaughter.
20	Aleš Kalan	Slovenia	March 12, 1992	car crash	An up-and-coming defender died as a result of a one-car crash incident just three days past his twentieth birthday after fighting for his life for 12 days in a hospital. Member of HK Acroni Jesenice played for Yugoslavia junior national team at U18 and U20 level.
19	Artem Kopot	Russia	July 20, 1992	car crash	A promising defenceman with the world champion Commonwealth of Independent States national junior team. Drafted in sixth round of the 1992 NHL entry draft by the Pittsburgh Penguins, Kopot was involved in a fatal one-car crash the following month in his hometown, five days prior to his twentieth birthday.
30	Roger Hägglund	Sweden	June 6, 1992	car crash	Played three games for the Quebec Nordiques in 1984–85.
27	John Kordic	Canada	August 8, 1992	lung failure due to heart malfunction from a drug overdose	Played 7 seasons and 244 games in the NHL from 1985 to 1992, most notably with the Montreal Canadiens and Toronto Maple Leafs. Won Stanley Cup in 1986 with Montreal. Won 1982-83 Memorial Cup with WHL's Portland Winter Hawks.
26	Sergei Bushmelyov	Russia	August 28, 1992	murdered	
18	Gary Rippingale	England; Great Britain	October 31, 1992	unknown cause	Played for the Nottingham Panthers of the British Hockey League. He also played for the Great Britain national ice hockey team at Under-18 level. He died following the Panthers' Halloween party. The number 3 jersey is retired by the Panthers in his honour.
19	Todd Klassen	Canada	July 22, 1993	car crash	Played for the Tri-City Americans of the Western Hockey League. Drafted by the Pittsburgh Penguins in the 1992 NHL entry draft.
27	Peter Mrozik	United States; Slovakia	June 28, 1994	car crash	Slovak-born American ice hockey player. Played in the 1st. Slovak National Hockey League in 1991. Later Mrozik resumed his career in Estonia.
24	Jakub Szal	Poland	December 8, 1994	heart attack	Played in the Polish Extraliga for Podhale Nowy Targ, STS Sanok.
23	Piotr Milan	Poland	January 23, 1995	bus accident	Played in the Polish Extraliga for STS Sanok.
29	Peter Karlsson	Sweden	March 11, 1995	stabbed to death	Played in the SEL for VIK Västerås HK.
25	Mike Colman	United States	April 5, 1995	car crash	Played fifteen games for the San Jose Sharks in 1991–92.
28	Bengt Åkerblom	Sweden	October 15, 1995	on-ice accident	Played 53 SEL games for Djurgårdens IF and five seasons for Mora IK in the second-level league. Neck was cut by a skate during an exhibition game.
21	Alexander Osadchy	Russia	1996	suicide	Drafted in round 4, #80 overall, by the San Jose Sharks during the 1993 NHL Draft.
25	Michel Breistroff	France	July 17, 1996	airplane crash	Played for France national team at 1996 Men's World Ice Hockey Championships. Played NCAA Division I hockey for Harvard University.
25	Jeff Batters	Canada	August 23, 1996	car crash	Played 16 games over two seasons for the St. Louis Blues from 1993 to 1995.
24	Yanick Dupré	Canada	August 16, 1997	leukemia	Played three seasons and 35 games for the Philadelphia Flyers from 1991 to 1996, the Yanick Dupre Memorial is awarded annually by the Flyers organization and by the American Hockey League for a player's service to his local community.
20	Graham Christie	Canada	November 25, 1997	on-ice accident	Played in the SJHL at the time of his death. The PJHL Rookie of the Year trophy is named in his honour.
29	Stéphane Morin	Canada	October 6, 1998	heart attack during game	Played five seasons and 90 games in the National Hockey League for the Quebec Nordiques and Vancouver Canucks; he was awarded the Leo P. Lamoureux Memorial Trophy as the IHL's leading scorer in 1995.
29	Chad Silver	Canada; Switzerland	December 3, 1998	heart attack	Played nine seasons and 374 games in the National League A mostly for the HC Fribourg-Gottéron and ZSC Lions Zurich.
26	Tibor Haviar	Slovakia	1999	shooting	Was goalkeeper, played for MHk 32 Liptovský Mikuláš and STS Sanok and represented Western Slovakia. Shot dead by unknown offender.
34	Petri Rautiainen	Finland	1999	brain tumor	Played two seasons in SM-liiga for Ässät Pori and Jokipojat Joensuu. Last two seasons of his career he played for Newcastle Cobras in the British Ice Hockey Superleague. Died on a relapsed brain tumor. His jersey was retired by Newcastle in 2001.
32	Steve Chiasson	Canada	May 3, 1999	impaired driving	Played thirteen seasons and 751 games in the NHL for the Detroit Red Wings, Calgary Flames, Hartford Whalers and Carolina Hurricanes from 1986–87 to 1998–99.
22	Dmitri Tertyshny	Russia	July 23, 1999	slashed jugular vein in boat accident	Played 62 games for the Philadelphia Flyers in 1998–99

=== 2000–2009 ===
Age	Player	Nationality	Date of death	Cause of death	Notes
24	Sergei Zemchenok	Russia	January 15, 2001	shot to death	Played in the Russian Superleague for Metallurg Magnitogorsk from 1993 to 2001.
28	Artur Malicki	Poland	February 14, 2001	hit by car as a pedestrian	Played in the Polish Extraliga for Unia Oświęcim.
38	Sergei Ageikin	Russia	May 31, 2001	leukemia	Played for Spartak Moskwa, Podhale Nowy Targ, Vityaz Podolsk, participated in IIHF World Championships 1986 (won gold medal with Soviet Union).
32	Viacheslav Bezukladnikov	Russia	July 10, 2001	liver cirrhosis	Master of Sports, forward. Champion of Russia (1994, 1996), winner of the European Cup (1997). Played for Avtomobilist Sverdlovsk, SKA Sverdlovsk, HC Lada Togliatti and the Russian national team, including at the 1994 Winter Olympics. One of the annual Russian ice hockey tournaments for children named in his honour. Only 11-year-old players can participate in this tournament because Bezukladnikov played with this jersey number.
22	Zoltan Batovsky	Slovakia	August 8, 2001	car crash	Played for the Kentucky Thoroughblades (AHL). Won a bronze medal at the 1999 World Junior Championships in Winnipeg, Slovakia's first IIHF medal as an independent nation. Played in the QMJHL for the Drummondville Voltigeurs.
26	Alexei Yegorov	Russia	March 2, 2002	Died from falling after escaping attackers	Drafted in round 3 #66 overall by the San Jose Sharks during the 1994 NHL Draft. Played two seasons with the Sharks.
22	Alexander Krevsun	Kazakhstan	July 3, 2002	cerebral hemorrhage	Drafted 124th overall in the 1999 NHL entry draft by the Nashville Predators. Died during a cross country workout with CSK VVS Samara.
22	Terence Tootoo	Canada	August 26, 2002	suicide	Played for the Roanoke Express (ECHL) and OCN Blizzard (MJHL). Brother of NHLer Jordin Tootoo.
24	Roman Lyashenko	Russia	July 5, 2003	suicide	Played four seasons in the NHL for the Dallas Stars and New York Rangers from 1999 to 2003.
23	Trevor Ettinger	Canada	July 26, 2003	suicide	Chosen 159th overall at the 1998 NHL Entry Draft by the Edmonton Oilers. Was playing for the AHL's Syracuse Crunch at the time of his death.
27	Grzegorz Pastuszak	Poland	August 14, 2003	hit by car as a pedestrian	Played in the Polish Extraliga for SKH Sanok.
25	Dan Snyder	Canada	October 5, 2003	car crash	Played three seasons and 49 games for the Atlanta Thrashers from 2000 to 2003; the OHL renamed its Humanitarian of the Year award to the Dan Snyder Memorial Trophy in Snyder's honour; Dany Heatley was the driver in the accident.
25	Richard Rampáček	Slovakia	October 23, 2003	motorcycle crash	Spent his entire career with HK 36 Skalica of the Slovak Extraliga. He was the leading goal scorer for his team at the time of his death. Rampáček played four games for the Slovak national team as well.
35	Viktor Karachun	Belarus	August 11, 2004	cancer	Played for Dinamo Minsk, Podhale Nowy Targ, German clubs in DEL, participated in IIHF World Championships 1998, 1999, 2000, 2001 and 2002, and Winter Olympics in 1998 and 2002.
27	Anatoli Ustyugov	Russia	September 27, 2004	murder, head injury	Played in Russia on teams such as Amur Khabarovsk, Lada Togliatti, and Spartak Moscow.
31	Sergejs Žoltoks	Latvia	November 3, 2004	hypertrophic cardiomyopathy during a match	Played ten seasons and 588 games in the National Hockey League for six teams from 1992 to 2004.
18	Jaxon Logan	USA	January 21, 2005	on-ice accident	Played for Brigham Young University men's ice hockey. Was hit by a puck which stopped his heart.
28	Jonathan Delisle	Canada	March 16, 2006	car crash	Drafted and played one game with Montreal Canadiens. Delisle died in an auto accident in March 2006 as a member of the Saint-Georges CRS Express. The Delisle Trophy has been named in his honor and is awarded to the LNAH player who "best exemplifies leadership in the regular season."
21	Stefan Blaho	Slovakia	August 30, 2006	car crash	Drafted 120th overall in the 2003 NHL entry draft by the New York Islanders. Played for the Sudbury Wolves and the Sarnia Sting of the OHL.
22	Alexei Savin	Belarus	June 18, 2007	car crash	Played for the Belarusian national team.
31	Martin Čech	Czech Republic	September 6, 2007	car crash	Played in the Czech Extraliga.
26	Darcy Robinson	Canada	September 27, 2007	heart attack	Played for Associazione Sportiva Asiago Hockey. His former team, the Wilkes-Barre/Scranton Penguins, dedicated their Robo's Readers program in his memory.
19	Mickey Renaud	Canada	February 18, 2008	hypertrophic cardiomyopathy	Captain of the Windsor Spitfires in the OHL; chosen in the 5th round of the 2007 NHL entry draft by the Calgary Flames.
21	Luc Bourdon	Canada	May 29, 2008	motorcycle accident	Drafted 10th overall in the 2005 NHL entry draft by the Vancouver Canucks; played 36 games in the NHL from 2006 to 2008.
20	KJ Ramolla	Canada	June 28, 2008	car crash	Played for the Newmarket Hurricanes of the OPJHL. Chosen in the fifth round of the 2004 OHL Priority Selection by the Kingston Frontenacs.
21	Igor Antosik	Russia	July 25, 2008	unknown	Central forward. Played for Russian national junior team, Dynamo Moscow (KHL, Russia) and Atlant Mytishchi (KHL, Russia) farm clubs. Died during cross-country in training camp.
18	Domagoj Kapec	Croatia	September 12, 2008	car crash	Played for KHL Zagreb in his homeland. Represented Croatia at two IIHF World Junior Hockey Championships.
19	Alexei Cherepanov	Russia	October 13, 2008	Myocarditis	Drafted 17th overall in the 2007 NHL entry draft by the New York Rangers. In 2008 played for Omsk Avangard (KHL, Russia). Omsk retired his number seven. KHL award to top rookie of the year named in his honour.
21	Don Sanderson	Canada	January 2, 2009	on-ice head injury	Played for the Whitby Dunlops of the Ontario Hockey Association. Struck head on ice during fight on December 12, 2008, and died three weeks later. Drafted by the Kitchener Rangers of the OHL in 2003.
19	Jordan Mistelbacher	Canada	January 13, 2009	alcohol poisoning	Played center for the Winnipeg Saints of the MJHL and Everett Silvertips of the Western Hockey League.
33	Gábor Ocskay	Hungary	March 24, 2009	heart attack	Played professionally for Alba Volán Székesfehérvár in Hungary. Was selected as best player in the league three times, and won scoring title three times. Scored 115 points in 187 games for the Hungarian national team.
21	Kiril Vajarov	Bulgaria	April 18, 2009	stabbing	Goaltender who played for Slavia Sofia in Bulgaria. Was a member of Bulgarian national team for two World Championships.
28	Robert Müller	Germany	May 21, 2009	brain cancer	Goaltender. Was drafted by the Washington Capitals in 2001. Champion of Germany in 2002–03 and 2006–07 seasons. Was a member of German national team. Played 127 games for his national team, participated in eight IIHF World Championships and two Winter Olympics in 2002 and 2006. Inducted into the German Ice Hockey Hall of Fame in March 2009. German Hockey League retired his number 80 league-wide.
18	Alexei Kuchin	Russia	September 26, 2009	car crash	Forward. Played for HC Krilya Sovetov (MHL, Russia).

=== 2010–2019 ===
Age	Player	Nationality	Date of death	Cause of death	Notes
23	Igor Misko	Russia	July 6, 2010	cardiac arrest while driving	Played for SKA St. Petersburg of the Kontinental Hockey League. Died after suffering cardiac arrest while driving a car in the Kolpino region of St. Petersburg.
20	Ben Pearson	Canada	October 2, 2010	urea cycle disorder	Played for Norwich Merchants, a junior C hockey team in Ontario. Also played for the OHL's Kingston Frontenacs and the Junior B Cambridge Winterhawks. His #7 jersey has been retired by the Merchants.
19	Markus Wächter	Germany	November 3, 2010	heart attack	Played for ESV Kaufbeuren (Germany). Died in a hospital after collapsing following a bodycheck in a national junior league game. It was later announced that Wächter suffered from a heart condition.
28	Tom Cavanagh	United States	January 7, 2011	suicide	Played for the San Jose Sharks and the Springfield Falcons (AHL). Diagnosed with schizophrenia; found dead in the Providence Mall parking garage after jumping to his death.
23	Mandi Schwartz	Canada	April 3, 2011	acute myeloid leukemia	Played for Yale University Bulldogs. Her younger brother Jaden is a member of the NHL's Seattle Kraken.
28	Derek Boogaard	Canada	May 13, 2011	accidental mixture of alcohol and oxycodone toxicity	Played six seasons and 277 games in the NHL, five with the Minnesota Wild and one with the New York Rangers, between 2005 and 2011.
27	Rick Rypien	Canada	August 15, 2011	suicide	Played 119 NHL games between 2005 and 2011.
36	Pavol Demitra	Slovakia	September 7, 2011	2011 Lokomotiv Yaroslavl plane crash	Played 847 NHL games between 1993 and 2010. He won the Lady Byng Trophy for sportsmanship in 2000. In 2003 he won a Bronze Medal playing for Slovakia in the World Championships. Slovakia men's national ice hockey team retired his number 38.
30	Josef Vašíček	Czech Republic	September 7, 2011	2011 Lokomotiv Yaroslavl plane crash	He was drafted 91st overall by the Carolina Hurricanes in the 1998 NHL entry draft and played 460 games in the NHL as well as 166 in the KHL. He was on the Carolina team that won the Stanley Cup in 2006. 2005 IIHF World Championship gold medal winner. Czech Republic men's national ice hockey team retired his number 63.
32	Karel Rachůnek	Czech Republic	September 7, 2011	2011 Lokomotiv Yaroslavl plane crash	Won a gold medal in 2010 and a bronze medal in 2011 playing for the Czech Republic in the World Championships. He played 371 games in the NHL and 152 games in the KHL in his career. Czech Republic men's national ice hockey team retired his number 4.
31	Jan Marek	Czech Republic	September 7, 2011	2011 Lokomotiv Yaroslavl plane crash	Drafted by the New York Rangers in the 8th round (243rd overall) of the 2003 NHL entry draft. Led the KHL in goals scored in the 2008–09 season with 35. Played 541 games professionally in the KHL and in the Czech Extraliga. 2010 IIHF World Championship gold medal winner. Czech Republic men's national ice hockey team retired his number 15.
30	Stefan Liv	Sweden	September 7, 2011	2011 Lokomotiv Yaroslavl plane crash	Playing for Sweden he won gold medals at the 2006 World Championships and the 2006 Winter Olympics, a silver medal at the 2004 World Championships, and bronze medals at the 2002 and 2009 World Championships. He played 308 games in the Swedish Elite League.
37	Kārlis Skrastiņš	Latvia	September 7, 2011	2011 Lokomotiv Yaroslavl plane crash	Played 832 games in the NHL. He also played on Latvian national teams in the 2002, 2006, and 2010 Olympic Games and ten different World Championships between 1993 and 2009. Nicknamed as "Iron Man" because of his streak of 495 consecutive appearances in the NHL regular games. Latvian national ice hockey team retired his number 7.
36	Ruslan Salei	Belarus	September 7, 2011	2011 Lokomotiv Yaroslavl plane crash	He was the first Belarusian first-round pick in the NHL, when the Mighty Ducks of Anaheim drafted him 9th overall in 1996. Played 917 games in the NHL over 14 years. He also played on the Belarusian national team in the 1998, 2002, and 2010 Olympic Games and nine different World Championships between 1994 and 2010.
24	Vitali Anikienko	Ukraine; Russia	September 7, 2011	2011 Lokomotiv Yaroslavl plane crash	Drafted 70th overall in the 2005 NHL entry draft by the Ottawa Senators. Played 235 regular games for Lokomotiv Yaroslavl (KHL) scoring 67 (19+48) points. 2003 IIHF World U18 Championship bronze medal winner. 2007 World Junior Championships silver medal winner.
31	Mikhail Balandin	Russia	September 7, 2011	2011 Lokomotiv Yaroslavl plane crash	Played 158 regular games in the KHL. 2000 World Junior Championships silver medal winner.
24	Gennady Churilov	Russia	September 7, 2011	2011 Lokomotiv Yaroslavl plane crash	Played 302 regular games in Russian Super League and KHL and 9 games for the Russian National team in the 2010–11 Euro Hockey Tour. 2006 and 2007 World Junior Championships silver medal winner.
25	Robert Dietrich	Germany	September 7, 2011	2011 Lokomotiv Yaroslavl plane crash	Member of the German National team in 2007, 2010 and 2011 IIHF World Championships.
23	Marat Kalimulin	Russia	September 7, 2011	2011 Lokomotiv Yaroslavl plane crash	Played 102 regular games in the KHL. 2008 World Junior Championships bronze medal winner.
23	Alexander Kalyanin	Russia	September 7, 2011	2011 Lokomotiv Yaroslavl plane crash	Played 94 regular games in the KHL and 6 games for the Russian National team in the 2010–11 Euro Hockey Tour.
24	Andrei Kiryukhin	Russia	September 7, 2011	2011 Lokomotiv Yaroslavl plane crash	Played 107 regular games in the KHL. 2007 World Junior Championships silver medal winner.
21	Nikita Klyukin	Russia	September 7, 2011	2011 Lokomotiv Yaroslavl plane crash	Played 104 regular games in the KHL for Lokomotiv Yaroslavl. 2007 World U18 Championship Gold Medal winner. 2009 World Junior Championships bronze medal winner.
21	Sergei Ostapchuk	Belarus	September 7, 2011	2011 Lokomotiv Yaroslavl plane crash	Played 36 regular games in the KHL for Lokomotiv Yaroslavl.
18	Maxim Shuvalov	Russia	September 7, 2011	2011 Lokomotiv Yaroslavl plane crash	2011 World U18 Championship bronze medal winner. Played 51 regular games in the MHL for Loko Yaroslavl.
19	Pavel Snurnitsyn	Russia	September 7, 2011	2011 Lokomotiv Yaroslavl plane crash	Played 115 regular games in the MHL for Loko Yaroslavl.
20	Daniil Sobchenko	Ukraine; Russia	September 7, 2011	2011 Lokomotiv Yaroslavl plane crash	Played 51 regular games in the KHL for Lokomotiv Yaroslavl. 2011 World Junior Championship gold medal winner. San Jose Sharks draft pick.
31	Ivan Tkachenko	Russia	September 7, 2011	2011 Lokomotiv Yaroslavl plane crash	Was selected by the Columbus Blue Jackets in the 4th round (98th overall) of the 2002 NHL entry draft. Played 553 regular games in Russian Super League and KHL. Winner of 2002 and 2003 Russian Superleague championships. 2002 IIHF World Championship silver medal winner.
33	Pavel Trakhanov	Russia	September 7, 2011	2011 Lokomotiv Yaroslavl plane crash	Played 589 regular games in Russian Super League and KHL.
20	Yuri Urychev	Russia	September 7, 2011	2011 Lokomotiv Yaroslavl plane crash	Played 23 regular games in the KHL for Lokomotiv Yaroslavl. 2011 World Junior Championship gold medal winner.
23	Alexander Vasyunov	Russia	September 7, 2011	2011 Lokomotiv Yaroslavl plane crash	Forward. Drafted 58th overall in the 2006 NHL entry draft by the New Jersey Devils. Played 18 NHL regular games scoring 5 (1+4) points and 187 AHL games scoring 91 (39+52) points. 2007 World Junior Championships silver medal winner.
38	Alexander Vyukhin	Ukraine; Russia	September 7, 2011	2011 Lokomotiv Yaroslavl plane crash	Goaltender. Played 647 regular games in Russian Super League and KHL. Winner of 2003–04 Russian Superleague championship.
21	Artem Yarchuk	Russia	September 7, 2011	2011 Lokomotiv Yaroslavl plane crash	2008 World U18 Championship silver medal winner.
26	Alexander Galimov	Russia	September 12, 2011	injuries sustained in a plane crash	Member of the silver medal-winning Russian U20 team at the 2005 World Junior Championships.
16	Maxim Koposov	Russia	February 17, 2012	hit by puck during game	
23	Bryan Rufenach	Canada	June 4, 2012	electrocution	Drafted 208th overall in the 2007 NHL entry draft, by the Detroit Red Wings. Fatally electrocuted while on vacation in Switzerland.
34	Remir Khaidarov	Russia	June 29, 2012	fire	
32	Dmitri Uchaykin	Russia	March 31, 2013	hit in head during game	Played for Amur Khabarovsk of the Russian Superleague and Kontinental Hockey League. Was a member of HC Ertis-Pavlodar in the Kazakhstan Vyschaya Liga at the time of his death.
20	Kristiāns Pelšs	Latvia	June 11, 2013	drowning	Pelšs was drafted by the Edmonton Oilers in the 7th round of the 2010 NHL entry draft. He appeared in 20 games for the Oklahoma City Barons of the American Hockey League, and also played in two games for the Latvian national ice hockey team.
23	Scott Winkler	Norway	June 12, 2013	undetermined	Chosen in the third round of the 2008 NHL entry draft by the Dallas Stars. Spent four years at Colorado College. Also played for Russell Stover midgets and the USHL's Cedar Rapids RoughRiders. Appeared at two World Under-18s and two World Junior Championships for Norway, including being named Best Forward at the 2010 World Juniors. Made the WCHA's All-Academic Team for three consecutive years.
16	Jordan Boyd	Canada	August 12, 2013	cardiac arrest	Played for Acadie–Bathurst Titan in the QMJHL
27	Tomasz Stasiowski	Poland	October 5, 2013	motorcycle crash	Played in the Polish Extraliga for TMH Polonia Bytom, and for Poland U-18, U-20.
19	Peter Halash	United States	January 5, 2014	car accident	Played for the Topeka Roadrunners in the NAHL. Died in a single-car accident on icy roads in Kansas.
20	Terry Trafford	Canada	March 11, 2014	suicide	Played for the Saginaw Spirit in the OHL. Died as a result of self-inflicted asphyxiation after going missing 8 days prior.
30	Jozef Salajka	Slovakia	May 20, 2014	motorcycle accident	Played 5 games for MsHK Žilina in Slovak extraliga. Salajka spent his entire career in minor leagues in Slovakia and Czech Republic.
21	Nick Egan	United States	August 9, 2014	hypertrophic cardiomyopathy, cardiac arrest	Defenceman for the Estevan Bruins of the Saskatchewan Junior Hockey League. Had graduated from the team and was pursuing a professional contract.
16	Alexander Orekhov	Russia	February 2, 2016	hit in the neck by a puck	Played for Metallurg Novokuznetsk of the Russia U18 League. Played 18 games, picking up 9 points before his death.
14	Ladislav Balogh	Slovakia	December 12, 2016	hit by a police car	Played for HC Petržalka 2010. He died just one day after his birthday.
20	Markus Olsson	Sweden	April 9, 2017	drowning	Goaltender for MODO Hockey's youth team.
25	Michael Doan	Canada	July 15, 2017	car crash	Played for the Soo Thunderbirds of the NOJHL, Wellington Dukes and the Huntsville Wildcats of the OJHL from 2010 to 2012. Played three seasons with the Northern Michigan University, and then a year with the Windsor Lancers CIS hockey team. Completed his first season in the SPHL with the Knoxville Ice Bears and the Evansville Thunderbolts
24	Sarah Stevenson	Canada	October 31, 2017	complications from neisseria meningitidis	Played 34 games for the Toronto Furies of the CWHL during the 2015–16 season. Also played four seasons at Liberty University. First ACHA player drafted in the CWHL.
16	Adam Herold	Canada	April 6, 2018	2018 Humboldt Broncos bus crash	Played 1 regular season game in the SJHL with the Humboldt Broncos and played 4 regular season games in the Western Hockey League with the Prince Albert Raiders. Was drafted 35th overall in the 2016 WHL Bantam Draft by the Prince Albert Raiders.
18	Logan Hunter	Canada	April 6, 2018	2018 Humboldt Broncos bus crash	Played 55 regular season games in the SJHL with the Humboldt Broncos.
20	Jaxon Joseph	Canada	April 6, 2018	2018 Humboldt Broncos bus crash	Played 104 regular season games in the SJHL between the Humboldt Broncos & Melfort Mustangs and played 21 regular season games in the BCHL with the Surrey Eagles. Son of NHL defenseman Chris Joseph.
19	Jacob Leicht	Canada	April 6, 2018	2018 Humboldt Broncos bus crash	Played 43 regular season games in the SJHL with the Humboldt Broncos.
21	Conner Lukan	Canada	April 6, 2018	2018 Humboldt Broncos bus crash	Played 56 regular season games in the SJHL with the Humboldt Broncos and played 161 regular season games in the AJHL with the Spruce Grove Saints. Was drafted 166th overall in the 2012 WHL Bantam Draft by the Brandon Wheat Kings.
20	Logan Schatz	Canada	April 6, 2018	2018 Humboldt Broncos bus crash	Played 187 regular season games in the SJHL with the Humboldt Broncos. Was drafted 186th overall in the 2012 WHL Bantam Draft by the Kootenay Ice. Schatz was the Broncos team captain.
18	Evan Thomas	Canada	April 6, 2018	2018 Humboldt Broncos bus crash	Played 49 regular season games in the SJHL with the Humboldt Broncos. Was drafted 209th overall in the 2014 WHL Bantam Draft by the Kootenay Ice.
18	Parker Tobin	Canada	April 6, 2018	2018 Humboldt Broncos bus crash	Played 22 regular season games in the SJHL with the Humboldt Broncos and played 48 regular season games in the AJHL between the Spruce Grove Saints, Drayton Valley Thunder & Olds Grizzlys.
21	Stephen Wack	Canada	April 6, 2018	2018 Humboldt Broncos bus crash	Played 99 regular season games in the SJHL between the Humboldt Broncos and played 76 regular season games in the AJHL between the Whitecourt Wolverines & Camrose Kodiaks. Was drafted 156th overall in the 2012 WHL Bantam Draft by the Prince George Cougars.
21	Logan Boulet	Canada	April 7, 2018	injuries sustained in a bus crash	Played 134 regular season games in the SJHL between the Humboldt Broncos & Kindersley Klippers.
32	Sergei Ogorodnikov	Russia	June 24, 2018	personal water craft accident	A 2004 New York Islanders' draft pick, Ogorodnikov represented Russia on two World Juniors teams and played primarily in Russia from 2003 to 2018.
18	Alec Reid	Canada	March 3, 2019	complications related to epilepsy	Played one season in the QMJHL between the Drummondville Voltigeurs and Blainville-Boisbriand Armada, with whom he was a member of at the time of his death.
21	Arunas Bermejo	Mexico	April 25, 2019	heart attack	Had moved to Lithuania to further his hockey career. Played for the Mexico national team at junior level and at the 2017 Division IIB World Championship.
24	Florian Janny	Austria	October 6, 2019	murder	Shot to death along with his girlfriend and her family members.
29	Samvel Mnatsyan	Russia	October 6, 2019	cancer	Defenceman. Played 183 games in the KHL for Barys Astana, HC Neftekhimik Nizhnekamsk and Admiral Vladivostok.

=== 2020–present day ===
Age	Player	Nationality	Date of death	Cause of death	Notes
18	Vilen Prokofyev	Kazakhstan	February 3, 2020	Ewing's sarcoma	Goaltender. Played in the MHL for the Snezhnye Barsy. Played 4 games for the Kazakhstan U-18 team.
25	Colby Cave	Canada	April 11, 2020	brain bleed due to a colloid cyst	Player in the NHL for the Edmonton Oilers. Also played in the NHL for the Boston Bruins. Was in medically induced coma prior to death.
20	Ondřej Buchtela	Czech Republic	July 24, 2020	heart cancer	Played 27 regular season games for Piráti Chomutov of the Czech Extraliga over three seasons. He also had a number of loan spells in the 1st Czech Republic Hockey League and last played for HC Benátky nad Jizerou. Played in the 2017 IIHF World U18 Championships for the Czech Republic.
30	Adam Comrie	United States	August 8, 2020	motorcycle accident	Drafted 80th overall in the 2008 NHL draft by Florida Panthers. Comrie spent eight seasons in the AHL and the ECHL before joining Klagenfurt AC whom he helped capture league title in EBEL in 2019.
19	Timur Faizutdinov	Russia	March 16, 2021	hit in head by puck	Faizutdinov was the captain of the MHK Dynamo St. Petersburg of the MHL at the time of his death.
32	Marek Trončinský	Czech Republic	May 22, 2021	unknown	Trončinský played as a defenseman for the team Gyergyói HK of the Erste Liga at the time of his death.
24	Matīss Kivlenieks	Latvia	July 4, 2021	fireworks accident	Goaltender for the Columbus Blue Jackets of the NHL. Also played for the Latvian national team in the 2021 IIHF World Championship.
20	Mack Motzko	United States	July 24, 2021	car crash	During his final season, played for Sioux Falls Stampede in USHL and New Mexico Ice Wolves in NAHL. Son of long-time college coach Bob Motzko.
24	Boris Sádecký	Slovakia	November 3, 2021	cardiac arrest	At the time of his death, Sádecký was playing as a forward for the Bratislava Capitals of the ICE Hockey League. He collapsed during a game in Austria on November 2, 2021, and died the next morning.
35	Cho Min-ho	South Korea	June 15, 2022	lung cancer	Captain of the Anyang Halla of Asia League Ice Hockey and scored the first-ever Winter Olympics goal for South Korea in 2018, when it was the host country.
18	Abakar Kazbekov	Russia	December 17, 2022	suicide	Played for the London Knights of the OHL. Went first overall in the 2021 OHL Under-18 Priority Selection.
33	Dale Harrop	New Zealand	December 17, 2022	surfing accident, drowning	Played in the NZIHL for the Canterbury Red Devils and West Auckland Admirals. Represented New Zealand internationally for over a decade.
37	Aditya Rama Putra	Indonesia	December 22, 2022	unknown	Played for the Indonesian national team between 2016 and 2022.
20	Alex Graham	Great Britain	June 25, 2023	accidental overdose	Played 45 games for the Sheffield Steelers of the Elite Ice Hockey League between 2020 and 2023.
33	Mike Hammond	Great Britain	July 20, 2023	car crash	Played 34 games with the British national team.
21	Rodion Amirov	Russia	August 14, 2023	brain tumor	Selected 15th overall by the Toronto Maple Leafs in the 2020 NHL Draft. Played 70 games for Salavat Yulaev Ufa of the KHL between 2019 and 2021.
25	Jan Dalgic	Germany	October 15, 2023	brain tumor	Appeared in 38 DEL2 games for ESV Kaufbeuren, as well as 96 Oberliga games for various teams. Also part of the roster in DEL for Kölner Haie in 2017 and ERC Ingolstadt in 2019, without appearing on-ice.
29	Adam Johnson	United States	October 28, 2023	throat cut by skate during game	Appeared in 13 games for the Pittsburgh Penguins from 2018 to 2020. He was playing for the Nottingham Panthers of the EIHL at the time of his death.
31	Alexander Reichenberg	Norway	May 5, 2024	suicide	Played 494 games in the Norwegian Eliteserien for Storhamar and Lillehammer, the latter of which he was an assistant captain at the time of his death. Reichenberg also had stints in the SHL, EBEL, and ELH. Reichenberg featured for the Norway men's national ice hockey team in the 2018 Olympic Games and in several IIHF World Cups.
31	Johnny Gaudreau	United States	August 29, 2024	struck by car while cycling	Played in the NHL for the Calgary Flames and Columbus Blue Jackets. Across parts of 11 NHL seasons, was a 7-time NHL All Star, NHL All-Rookie Team selection, one-time NHL First All-Star Team selection, and the 2017 recipient of the Lady Byng Memorial Trophy. Gaudreau's brother and retired ice hockey player, Matthew, was killed in the same crash. Matthew was head coach at Gloucester Catholic High School in New Jersey at the time of his death.
26	Tobias Eder	Germany	January 29, 2025	cancer	Played 263 games in the German Deutsche Eishockey Liga for Eisbären Berlin, Düsseldorf EG and EHC München, Eder featured for the Germany men's national ice hockey team in several IIHF events including Division I A in the 2018 World Junior Ice Hockey Championships and the 2024 IIHF World Championship.
19	Gary Kelly	Scotland	July 21, 2025	fall	Played 2 games in the British Elite Ice Hockey League. Represented Scotland youth national ice hockey team.
20	Christophe Babin	Canada	July 25, 2025	suicide	Played 84 games in the Ligue de Hockey Junior du Québec. Was a member of the Joliette Prédateurs at the time of his death. He had made his debut in the Ligue nationale de hockey balle only a week before his death.
17	Noland Lillington	Canada	July 31, 2025	motorcycle accident	Was a member of the Eastern Shore Thunder of the Nova Scotia Regional Junior Hockey League at the time of his death.
23	Evan Armit	Canada	August 24, 2025	cancer	Was a member of the Worcester State University ice hockey team in Division 3 of the NCAA at the time of his death.
25	Orca Wiesblatt	Canada	September 14, 2025	car crash	Was under contract with the Allen Americans of the ECHL at the time of his death. Last appeared with the Athens Rock Lobsters of the Federal Prospects Hockey League.
18	JJ Wright	Canada	February 2, 2026	car crash	Played for the Southern Alberta Mustangs of the United States Premier Hockey League (USPHL).
18	Cameron Casorso	Canada	February 2, 2026	car crash	Played for the Southern Alberta Mustangs of the United States Premier Hockey League (USPHL).
17	Caden Fine	United States	February 2, 2026	car crash	Played for the Southern Alberta Mustangs of the United States Premier Hockey League (USPHL).
22	Bradly Burden	Scotland	February 24, 2026	car crash	Played for the Niagara University club hockey team at the time of his death.
15	Carter Heise	United States	March 2, 2026	car crash	Played for the Dallas Penguins 16U A club hockey team and Plano East Senior High School hockey team at the time of his death.
20	Barna Borsos	Hungary	March 7, 2026	car crash	Former junior player for the U18 Hungary men's national ice hockey team. Played for the UTE U21 Academy team at the time of his death.
21	Ian Hutchison	United States	May 2026	suicide	Played for the University of Maryland club ice hockey team at the time of his death.

== See also ==
- Sportspeople who died during their careers
- Sudden cardiac death of athletes
- List of ice hockey players who died in wars
