= Howie Hughes =

Canadian ice hockey player (1939–2025)

- Born: April 4, 1939; St. Boniface, Manitoba, Canada
- Died: March 26, 2025 (aged 85); Everett, Washington, U.S.
- Height: 5 ft 9 in (175 cm)
- Weight: 180 lb (82 kg; 12 st 12 lb)
- Position: Forward
- Shot: Left
- Played for: Los Angeles Kings
- Playing career: 1967–1970

Howard Duncan Hughes (April 4, 1939 – March 26, 2025) was a Canadian professional ice hockey forward who played 168 games in the National Hockey League for the Los Angeles Kings from 1967 to 1970.

== Career statistics ==
=== Regular season and playoffs ===
| | | | Regular season | | | | | Playoffs |
| Season | Team | League | GP | G | A | Pts | PIM | GP | G | A | Pts | PIM |
|---|---|---|---|---|---|---|---|---|---|---|---|---|
| 1954–55 | St. Boniface Braves | MAHA | — | — | — | — | — | — | — | — | — | — |
| 1955–56 | St. Boniface Canadiens | MJHL | — | — | — | — | — | 1 | 0 | 0 | 0 | 0 |
| 1956–57 | St. Boniface Canadiens | MJHL | 21 | 9 | 13 | 22 | 0 | 3 | 0 | 0 | 0 | 0 |
| 1957–58 | St. Boniface Canadiens | MJHL | 30 | 18 | 15 | 33 | 26 | 12 | 4 | 6 | 10 | 4 |
| 1957–58 | St. Boniface Canadiens | M-Cup | — | — | — | — | — | 9 | 1 | 1 | 2 | 2 |
| 1958–59 | St. Boniface Canadiens | MJHL | 27 | 10 | 18 | 28 | 35 | 6 | 1 | 2 | 3 | 14 |
| 1958–59 | Winnipeg Braves | M-Cup | — | — | — | — | — | 16 | 8 | 5 | 13 | 10 |
| 1959–60 | St. Paul Saints | IHL | 68 | 35 | 44 | 79 | 33 | 13 | 5 | 8 | 13 | 12 |
| 1960–61 | Winnipeg Warriors | WHL | 68 | 12 | 23 | 35 | 26 | — | — | — | — | — |
| 1961–62 | Seattle Totems | WHL | 64 | 17 | 22 | 39 | 22 | 2 | 0 | 2 | 2 | 2 |
| 1962–63 | Vancouver Canucks | WHL | 40 | 5 | 10 | 15 | 12 | 7 | 0 | 0 | 0 | 2 |
| 1963–64 | St. Paul Rangers | CHL | 66 | 30 | 34 | 64 | 37 | 8 | 1 | 3 | 4 | 2 |
| 1964–65 | Vancouver Canucks | WHL | 67 | 24 | 26 | 50 | 26 | 5 | 0 | 0 | 0 | 2 |
| 1965–66 | Vancouver Canucks | WHL | 65 | 37 | 35 | 72 | 24 | 7 | 3 | 2 | 5 | 0 |
| 1966–67 | Seattle Totems | WHL | 70 | 26 | 45 | 71 | 27 | 10 | 6 | 5 | 11 | 4 |
| 1967–68 | Los Angeles Kings | NHL | 74 | 9 | 14 | 23 | 20 | 7 | 2 | 0 | 2 | 0 |
| 1968–69 | Los Angeles Kings | NHL | 73 | 16 | 14 | 30 | 10 | 7 | 0 | 0 | 0 | 2 |
| 1969–70 | Los Angeles Kings | NHL | 21 | 0 | 4 | 4 | 0 | — | — | — | — | — |
| 1970–71 | Springfield Kings | AHL | 2 | 0 | 1 | 1 | 4 | — | — | — | — | — |
| 1970–71 | Denver Spurs | WHL | 62 | 19 | 21 | 40 | 19 | 5 | 2 | 2 | 4 | 8 |
| 1971–72 | Seattle Totems | WHL | 71 | 17 | 29 | 46 | 26 | — | — | — | — | — |
| 1972–73 | San Diego Gulls | WHL | 68 | 23 | 25 | 48 | 23 | 6 | 4 | 1 | 5 | 2 |
| 1973–74 | Portland Buckaroos | WHL | 75 | 41 | 36 | 77 | 22 | 10 | 3 | 4 | 7 | 2 |
| 1974–75 | Seattle Totems | CHL | 48 | 11 | 15 | 26 | 16 | — | — | — | — | — |
| WHL totals | | | 650 | 221 | 272 | 493 | 227 | 52 | 18 | 16 | 34 | 22 |
| NHL totals | | | 168 | 25 | 32 | 57 | 30 | 14 | 2 | 0 | 2 | 2 |

== Post-playing career ==
After his playing days ended, Hughes coached the junior Seattle Ironmen ice hockey team, formerly known as the Northwest Americans, for about 30 years. He also coached Babe Ruth League baseball and was an umpire in local softball leagues.

== Personal life and age ==
Hughes was born in the Winnipeg suburb of St. Boniface, Manitoba, and was raised in nearby Transcona. He was skilled at playing baseball and football as well as ice hockey, the sport that he began playing professionally at age 19. He began living in the Magnolia neighborhood of Seattle during his first of four periods playing for the Seattle Totems, during the 1961–62 season. He continued to reside in Magnolia during and after his playing days, until he moved to Everett, Washington, a few years after his wife, Betty, died in 2004.

Hughes died of congestive heart failure on March 26, 2025, at the age of 85.

== Awards and achievements ==
- Turnbull Cup MJHL Championship (1958)
- Memorial Cup Championship (1959)
- WHL Second All-Star Team (1967)
- WHL Championship (1967)
- WHL First All-Star Team (1974)
- Member of the Manitoba Hockey Hall of Fame
- Member of the Manitoba Sports Hall of Fame and Museum (inducted in 1995)
- Member of the Washington Slowpitch Hall of Fame (inducted in 2000)
