= Gary Bergman =

Canadian ice hockey player (1938–2000)

- Born: October 7, 1938 Kenora, Ontario, Canada
- Died: December 8, 2000 (aged 62) Detroit, United States
- Height: 6 ft 0 in (183 cm)
- Weight: 188 lb (85 kg; 13 st 6 lb)
- Position: Defence
- Shot: Left
- Played for: AHL; Buffalo Bisons; Cleveland Barons; Quebec Aces; NHL; Detroit Red Wings; Minnesota North Stars; Kansas City Scouts
- National team: Canada
- Playing career: 1960–1976

Gary Gunnar Bergman (October 7, 1938 – December 8, 2000) was a Canadian professional ice hockey player. A defenceman, Bergman played in the National Hockey League from 1964 to 1976, mostly for the Detroit Red Wings. He was also a part of Team Canada in the 1972 Summit Series.

== Playing career ==
=== Minor league career ===
The professional hockey world had its first look at Bergman in 1957 when the Winnipeg Warriors of the Western Hockey League called up the young defenceman currently on the MJHL's Winnipeg Braves. After two years with the Warriors, and solid defensive play, Bergman moved into the American Hockey League and continued to gain experience while skating with four different AHL squads, including the Buffalo Bisons, Cleveland Barons, Quebec Aces, and the Springfield Indians. It was after this last season in 1964 that the NHL finally took notice. The Detroit Red Wings claimed Bergman in the 1964 NHL Intra-League Draft on June 10 and put the hard-working defenceman to the test.

=== NHL career ===
Bergman joined the Detroit Red Wings for the 1964–65 season and looked very comfortable as a freshman. In 58 games, Bergman held back his offensive instincts while focusing on his defensive work. Gradually he gained confidence and seniority on the team. He played solidly when the Wings reached the 1966 Stanley Cup finals and lost to the Montreal Canadiens in six games. Bergman was the man tangled up with Montreal’s Henri Richard when Richard scored the Stanley Cup-winning goal against Detroit in overtime during Game 6 of the 1965–66 final series. Bergman, like all Wings from that season, was convinced Richard pushed the puck in with his glove and the goal should not have counted. He said this after the game,

"I took him down and held his stick in my hand, there was no way he could score."

Bergman continued to improve his defensive and offensive roles on the team throughout the early 1970s. His well-rounded play made him useful on both the power-play and penalty-killing units for the Wings. Although he incurred his share of penalties, Bergman wasn't considered a surly opponent on the ice. He rarely looked for trouble but also never backed down from an onrushing opponent, whether he was a fancy scorer or a power forward. While all eyes were on young superstars like Bobby Orr and Brad Park, the Red Wings were a mediocre team that continued to lose respect in the league, especially with the retirement of Gordie Howe. Bergman started turning to the community, becoming involved in many outside charities and organizations. He was particularly involved with helping disabled children and adults. He was one of the most liked NHLers off the ice due to his charity work and in 1973 he was named co-winner of the Charlie Conacher Humanitarian Award.

After 10 years as a Wing, Bergman was traded to the Minnesota North Stars for fellow veteran blueliner Ted Harris on November 7, 1973. One thought as to why he was traded stemmed from Bergman speaking out when he disagreed with the decisions of the general manager Ned Harkness, Jan. 1971-1974. He would post 26 points to go along with his consistent defensive play in the 1973–74 season for the North Stars.

Alex Delvecchio, Gary's former teammate, captain, and the Red Wings coach was named GM in May 1974. He reacquired Gary on October 1, 1974, for Detroit's third-round draft pick in 1975 (who ended up being Alex Pirus). He would score 30 points for his former team before being traded again the following year. Along with Bill McKenzie, Bergman was traded on August 22, 1975, for Peter McDuffe and Glen Burdon to the newly formed Kansas City Scouts where he would spend his final NHL season. In 1975–76, Bergman would record his second-highest point total of his NHL career, scoring five goals and tacking on 33 assists to finish with 38 total points.

Bergman retired with 367 points in 838 regular-season games. In nearly a decade and a half of NHL service, he had the chance to play in only 21 post-season games, 12 of them taking place in 1966.

=== 1972 Summit Series ===
In 1972 Bergman received a huge compliment when Harry Sinden and John Ferguson invited him to play with Team Canada in the 1972 Summit Series. Bergman recounted the day he was asked to play for his country,

"Harry called me Sunday morning. Janie and the kids and I were just going out the door to church, and I had to stop. Janie was saying, 'Would you get off the damn phone, we have to get to church.' It was Harry Sinden on the phone asking me if I'd be part of the team."

Bergman played an important defensive role in all eight games against the Soviets and chipped in with three assists.

On December 8, 2000, Bergman died from an eight-month battle from cancer.

He would posthumously be honored for his defensive efforts in 2005, when the team was honored, en masse, as members of the Canadian Sports Hall of Fame.

== Awards and achievements ==
- Turnbull Cup (MJHL) championship (1959)
- Memorial Cup championship (1959)
- Selected to Team Canada for the 1972 Summit Series
- Played in NHL All-Star Game (1973)
- Honoured Member of the Canada's Sports Hall of Fame
- Honoured Member of the Manitoba Hockey Hall of Fame

== Career statistics ==
=== Regular season and playoffs ===
			Regular season					Playoffs
Season	Team	League	GP	G	A	Pts	PIM	GP	G	A	Pts	PIM
1957–58	Winnipeg Braves	MJHL	30	4	2	6	73	5	1	2	3	14
1957–58	Winnipeg Warriors	WHL	2	0	0	0	0	—	—	—	—	—
1958–59	Winnipeg Braves	MJHL	29	15	15	30	114	24	4	20	24	46
1959–60	Winnipeg Warriors	WHL	58	1	9	10	147	—	—	—	—	—
1960–61	Buffalo Bisons	AHL	67	5	14	19	104	4	0	0	0	12
1961–62	Cleveland Barons	AHL	68	10	30	40	164	6	1	2	3	14
1962–63	Quebec Aces	AHL	8	1	2	3	14	—	—	—	—	—
1962–63	Cleveland Barons	AHL	47	4	19	23	127	7	1	5	6	10
1963–64	Springfield Indians	AHL	60	13	24	37	106	—	—	—	—	—
1964–65	Detroit Red Wings	NHL	58	4	7	11	85	5	0	1	1	4
1965–66	Detroit Red Wings	NHL	61	3	16	19	96	12	0	3	3	14
1965–66	Memphis Wings	CPHL	5	2	3	5	4	—	—	—	—	—
1966–67	Detroit Red Wings	NHL	70	5	30	35	129	—	—	—	—	—
1967–68	Detroit Red Wings	NHL	74	13	28	41	109	—	—	—	—	—
1968–69	Detroit Red Wings	NHL	76	7	30	37	80	—	—	—	—	—
1969–70	Detroit Red Wings	NHL	69	6	17	23	122	4	0	1	1	2
1970–71	Detroit Red Wings	NHL	68	8	25	33	149	—	—	—	—	—
1971–72	Detroit Red Wings	NHL	75	6	31	37	138	—	—	—	—	—
1972–73	Detroit Red Wings	NHL	68	3	28	31	71	—	—	—	—	—
1973–74	Detroit Red Wings	NHL	11	0	6	6	18	—	—	—	—	—
1973–74	Minnesota North Stars	NHL	57	3	23	26	66	—	—	—	—	—
1974–75	Detroit Red Wings	NHL	76	5	25	30	104	—	—	—	—	—
1975–76	Kansas City Scouts	NHL	75	5	33	38	82	—	—	—	—	—
NHL totals			838	68	299	367	1249	21	0	5	5	20

=== International ===
Year	Team	Event	GP	G	A	Pts	PIM
1972	Canada	SS	8	0	3	3	13

Preceded by Red Berenson	Detroit Red Wings captain 1973–74	Succeeded by Ted Harris
