= Ted Green =

Canadian ice hockey player and coach (1940–2019)

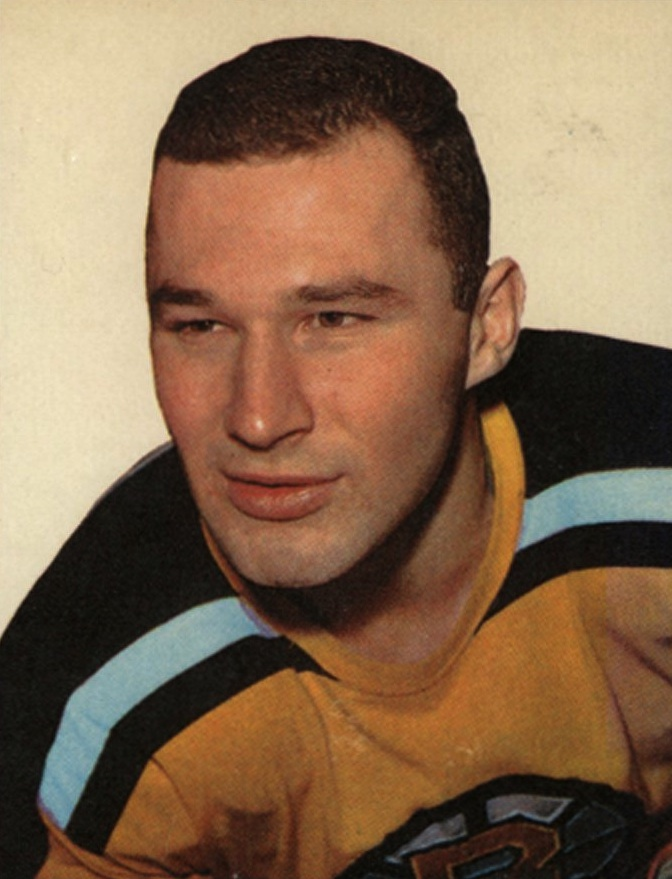
- Green with the Boston Bruins in 1962
- Born: March 23, 1940 Eriksdale, Manitoba, Canada
- Died: October 8, 2019 (aged 79) Edmonton, Alberta, Canada
- Height: 5 ft 11 in (180 cm)
- Weight: 185 lb (84 kg; 13 st 3 lb)
- Position: Defence
- Shot: Right
- Played for: Boston Bruins; New England Whalers; Winnipeg Jets
- Coached for: Edmonton Oilers
- Playing career: 1959–1979
- Coaching career: 1982–2004

Edward Joseph "Terrible Ted" Green (March 23, 1940 – October 8, 2019) was a Canadian professional ice hockey coach and player. Green played defence in the National Hockey League (NHL) for the Boston Bruins and in the World Hockey Association (WHA) for the New England Whalers and Winnipeg Jets, and was noted for his physical play; he won two Stanley Cups and three Avco World Trophys for a total of five league championships; Green is one of just seven players in the WHA to win the Avco Trophy three times and he was the first player to win Avco Cups with multiple teams. Green served as a head coach with the Edmonton Oilers and was an assistant coach with the Oilers and the New York Rangers.

== Playing career ==
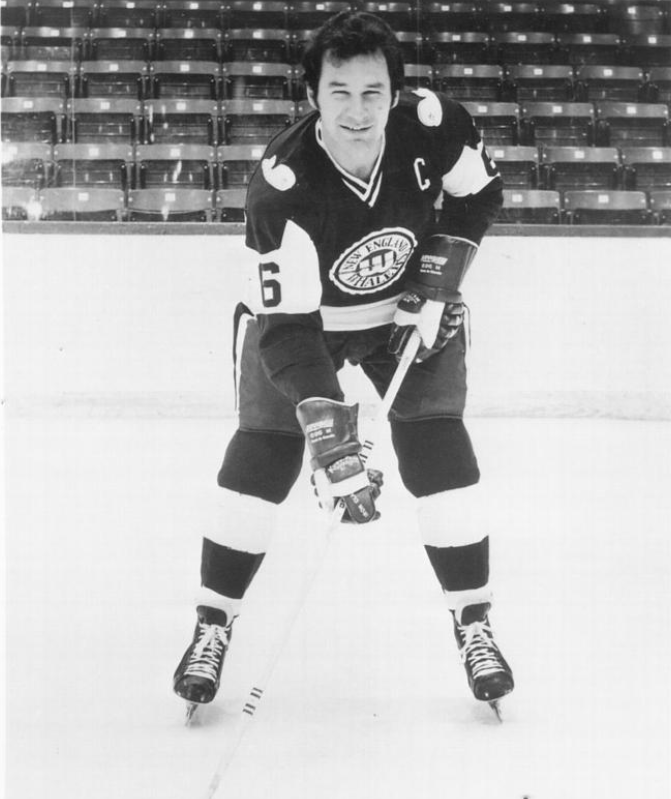
1972-73 photo of Ted Green of the New England Whalers.

Green played junior hockey in Manitoba for the Winnipeg Braves, winning the Memorial Cup in the 1958–59 season. He was originally the property of the Montreal Canadiens but was claimed by the Bruins in the summer of 1960 and was called up for good in the 1961–62 season. He played ten seasons for Boston, gaining a reputation as a hard-hitting defensive defenceman, as well as one for violent play, and was a bulwark on the blue line when the Bruins emerged from being at the bottom of the league to become a powerhouse in the late 1960s. He was named to play in the All-Star Game in 1965 and 1969.

Coming off his best season in 1969 (for which he was named to the Second All-Star Team), Green was involved in an infamous incident in an exhibition game in Ottawa versus the St. Louis Blues on September 21, 1969, engaging in a bloody stick fight with Blues' forward Wayne Maki. Green was struck in the head, suffering a fractured skull and brain damage. He missed the entire regular season and playoffs, during which Boston won the Stanley Cup. Maki and Green were both charged with assault as a result of the incident, the first time NHL players faced charges as a result of on-ice violence; both were acquitted. Green was suspended by the NHL for 13 games. Though Green did not officially win the Cup, his teammates gave him his share of the prize money, and his name was also engraved on the Stanley Cup in 1970. Green's near-fatal encounter would further propel discourse around the conversation of mandatory helmets in hockey.

Despite headaches and a weakened left side, he returned to hockey in the following season. He played two more years with Boston (and played for the 1972 Cup-winning team) before jumping to the upstart New England Whalers in the WHA, being named their first captain and leading the team to the WHA's inaugural league championship. After three seasons with the Whalers, he was traded to the Winnipeg Jets, where he won the Avco Cup twice more. When he won the Cup in 1978, he became the first player to win the trophy three times. In the 1978-79 season in January 1979, Green announced his retirement on January 22, 1979 due to pain from his arthritic knees.

Green ended his playing career with 254 points and 1,029 penalty minutes in 620 games (NHL) and 180 points and 304 penalty minutes in 452 games (WHA). He ranked 17th all-time in games played in the WHA.

== Coaching career ==
After his retirement, Green coached the intermediate league Carman Hornets to a provincial title in 1979–80. He then joined the Edmonton Oilers as an assistant coach under close friend Glen Sather, who had played alongside him in Boston from 1967 to 1969. He attracted Sather's attention with his pages of notes that he wrote in scouting teams (as written by his left hand, which he had to learn to do after his injury). He won five more cups in 1984, 1985, 1987, 1988, 1990 to win seven in total. Notably, Green once refused to shake hands with an assistant coach of the opposing team after hearing they had criticized Edmonton's coaching staff. When told they were once a sportswriter, Green replied, “I knew there was something wrong with him." In the 1990-91 season, Green served as a co-coach alongside John Muckler.

Green was named head coach of the Oilers in 1991, just as the Oilers' 1980s championship years were ending, though he led the team to the conference finals in 1992. With the Oilers' dynasty disintegrating, they missed the playoffs altogether in 1993—the first time they had been out of the postseason as an NHL team. Following a slow start in the 1993–94 NHL season, Sather fired Green 24 games into the season.

== Personal life and death ==
Green had three children with his wife Pat.

Green died in Edmonton on October 8, 2019, after a long illness.

== Awards and achievements ==
- Memorial Cup Championship (1959)
- NHL Second All-Star Team (1969)
- Played in NHL All-Star Game (1965 & 1969)
- Stanley Cup championship (1970, 1972) as a player
- Stanley Cup championship (1984, 1985, 1987, 1988) as assistant coach
- Stanley Cup championship (1990) as a co-coach
- Avco Cup championships (1973, 1976, & 1978)
- Inducted into the Manitoba Sports Hall of Fame and Museum in 2003
- Honoured Member of the Manitoba Hockey Hall of Fame
- Inaugural member of the World Hockey Association Hall of Fame
- Top 100 Bruins players of all time (2023)

== Career statistics ==
=== Regular season and playoffs ===
			Regular season					Playoffs
Season	Team	League	GP	G	A	Pts	PIM	GP	G	A	Pts	PIM
1956–57	St. Boniface Canadiens	MJHL	17	1	2	3	76	7	0	0	0	10
1957–58	St. Boniface Canadiens	MJHL	23	1	4	5	97	12	1	2	3	32
1957–58	St. Boniface Canadiens	M-Cup	—	—	—	—	—	11	2	3	5	38
1958–59	St. Boniface Canadiens	MJHL	25	5	11	16	120	9	1	5	6	32
1958–59	Winnipeg Braves	M-Cup	—	—	—	—	—	16	2	6	8	50
1958–59	Winnipeg Warriors	WHL	1	0	0	0	4	—	—	—	—	—
1959–60	Winnipeg Warriors	WHL	70	8	20	28	109	—	—	—	—	—
1960–61	Boston Bruins	NHL	1	0	0	0	2	—	—	—	—	—
1960–61	Kingston Frontenacs	EPHL	11	1	5	6	30	5	1	0	1	2
1960–61	Winnipeg Warriors	WHL	57	1	18	19	127	—	—	—	—	—
1961–62	Boston Bruins	NHL	66	3	8	11	116	—	—	—	—	—
1962–63	Boston Bruins	NHL	70	1	11	12	117	—	—	—	—	—
1963–64	Boston Bruins	NHL	70	4	10	14	145	—	—	—	—	—
1964–65	Boston Bruins	NHL	70	8	27	35	156	—	—	—	—	—
1965–66	Boston Bruins	NHL	27	5	13	18	113	—	—	—	—	—
1966–67	Boston Bruins	NHL	47	6	10	16	67	—	—	—	—	—
1967–68	Boston Bruins	NHL	72	7	36	43	133	4	1	1	2	11
1968–69	Boston Bruins	NHL	65	8	38	46	99	10	2	7	9	18
1970–71	Boston Bruins	NHL	78	5	37	42	60	7	1	0	1	25
1971–72	Boston Bruins	NHL	54	1	16	17	21	10	0	0	0	0
1972–73	New England Whalers	WHA	78	16	30	46	47	12	1	5	6	25
1973–74	New England Whalers	WHA	75	7	26	33	42	7	0	4	4	2
1974–75	New England Whalers	WHA	57	6	14	20	29	3	0	0	0	2
1975–76	Winnipeg Jets	WHA	79	5	23	28	73	11	0	2	2	16
1976–77	Winnipeg Jets	WHA	70	4	21	25	45	20	1	3	4	12
1977–78	Winnipeg Jets	WHA	73	4	22	26	52	8	0	2	2	2
1978–79	Winnipeg Jets	WHA	20	0	2	2	16	—	—	—	—	—
WHA totals			452	42	138	180	304	61	2	16	18	57
NHL totals			620	48	206	254	1,029	31	4	8	12	54

== Coaching record ==
Team	Year	Regular season						Post season
Team	Year	G	W	L	T	Pts	Finish	Result
Edmonton Oilers	1991–92	80	36	34	10	82	3rd in Smythe	Lost in conference finals
Edmonton Oilers	1992–93	84	26	50	8	60	5th in Smythe	Missed playoffs
Edmonton Oilers	1993–94	24	3	18	3	9	6th in Smythe	(fired)
Total		188	65	102	21			

Preceded by John Muckler	Head coach of the Edmonton Oilers; 1991–93	Succeeded by Glen Sather
Preceded by Position created	New England Whalers captain 1972–75	Succeeded by Rick Ley
