= 1959 Memorial Cup =

Canadian junior ice hockey championship

The Memorial Cup trophy

The 1959 Memorial Cup final was the 41st junior ice hockey championship of the Canadian Amateur Hockey Association. The George Richardson Memorial Trophy champions Peterborough TPT Petes of the Ontario Hockey Association in Eastern Canada competed against the Abbott Cup champions Winnipeg Braves of the Manitoba Junior Hockey League in Western Canada. In a best-of-seven series, held at the Winnipeg Arena in Winnipeg, Manitoba and at Wheat City Arena in Brandon, Manitoba, Winnipeg won their 1st Memorial Cup, defeating Peterborough 4 games to 1.

== Scores ==
Scheduling for the 1959 Memorial Cup was supervised by Canadian Amateur Hockey Association second vice-president Jack Roxburgh.

- Game 1: Peterborough 5-4 Winnipeg (in Winnipeg)
- Game 2: Winnipeg 5-2 Peterborough (in Winnipeg)
- Game 3: Winnipeg 5-2 Peterborough (in Winnipeg)
- Game 4: Winnipeg 5-3 Peterborough (in Winnipeg)
- Game 5: Winnipeg 6-2 Peterborough (in Brandon)

== Winning roster ==
Pat Angers, Don Atamanchuk, Al Baty, Gary Bergman, Ed Bradawski, Rene Brunel, Ted Green, Howie Hughes, Allan Ingimundson, Ken King, Ted Knight, Gerry Kruk, Wayne Larkin, Al Leblanc, Bobby Leiter, Doug Monro, Zenon Moroz, Lew Mueller, John Rodgers, P. Sexsmith, John Sutherland, Ernie Wakely, Wayne Winstone, Bob Wales. Coach: Bill Allum
