= Gary Rippingale =

English ice hockey player

- Born: 10 July 1974
- Died: 29 October 1992 (aged 18)
- team: Nottingham Panthers

Gary Rippingale (10 July 1974 – 29 October 1992) was an English professional ice hockey defenceman who played for the Nottingham Panthers. He also played for the Great Britain national ice hockey team at under-18 level.

Rippingale died on 29 October 1992, aged 18, from unknown causes following the team's Halloween party. His number 3 jersey was posthumously retired by the Panthers in his memory.

== See also ==
List of ice hockey players who died during their careers
