= Artem Yarchuk =

Russian ice hockey player

- Born: 3 May 1990; Yaroslavl, Soviet Union
- Died: 7 September 2011 (aged 21); Yaroslavl, Russia
- Height: 5 ft 10 in (178 cm)
- Weight: 165 lb (75 kg; 11 st 11 lb)
- Position: Left wing
- Shot: Left
- Played for: Lokomotiv Yaroslavl (KHL)
- NHL draft: Undrafted
- Playing career: 2010–2011

Artem Nikolayevich Yarchuk (Russian: Артём Николаевич Ярчук) (3 May 1990 – 7 September 2011) was a Russian professional ice hockey winger who played for Lokomotiv Yaroslavl of the Kontinental Hockey League (KHL).

== Death ==
On 7 September 2011, Yarchuk was killed in the 2011 Lokomotiv Yaroslavl plane crash, when a Yakovlev Yak-42 passenger aircraft, carrying nearly his entire Lokomotiv team, crashed just outside Yaroslavl, Russia. The team was traveling to Minsk to play their opening game of the season, with its coaching staff and prospects. Lokomotiv officials said "'everyone from the main roster was on the plane plus four players from the youth team.'"

== See also ==
- List of ice hockey players who died during their playing career
