= Veikko Suominen =

Finnish ice hockey player

- Born: May 5, 1948 Rauma, Finland
- Died: December 28, 1978 (aged 30) Tampere, Finland
- Height: 5 ft 10 in (178 cm)
- Weight: 167 lb (76 kg; 11 st 13 lb)
- Position: Forward
- Shot: Right
- Played for: SM-liiga; Upon Pallo; Kiekko-67; Ilves
- Playing career: 1967–1978

Veikko Suominen (May 5, 1948 – December 28, 1978) was an ice hockey player who played in the SM-liiga for Upon Pallo, Kiekko-67 and Ilves from 1967 to 1978.

== Death ==
Suominen committed suicide on December 28, 1978, while a member of the Tampere-based team Ilves. After his death, Ilves retired his jersey number, 24, out of use immediately and it has not been assigned since.

Preceded by Seppo Ahokainen	Captain of Ilves; 1976-1978	Succeeded by Lasse Oksanen
