= Gennady Churilov =

Russian ice hockey player

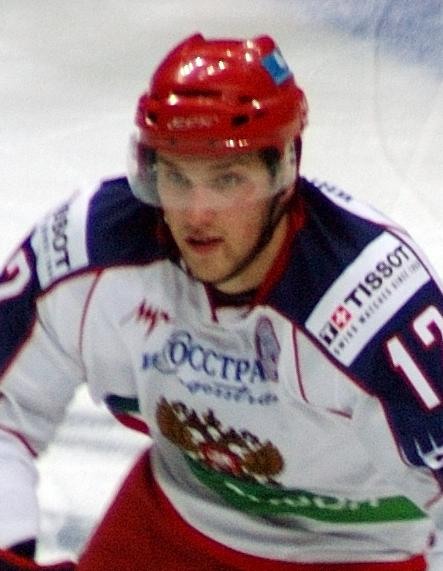
- Born: 5 May 1987 Magnitogorsk, Soviet Union
- Died: 7 September 2011 (aged 24) Yaroslavl, Russia
- Height: 6 ft 0 in (183 cm)
- Weight: 185 lb (84 kg; 13 st 3 lb)
- Position: Centre
- Shot: Left
- Played for: Lokomotiv Yaroslavl
- National team: Russia
- NHL draft: Undrafted
- Playing career: 2005–2011

Gennady Churilov
Medal record

Representing Russia

Ice hockey

World Junior Championships
Silver medal – second place	2007 Sweden	

Gennady Stanislavovich Churilov (Russian: Геннадий Станиславович Чурилов) (5 May 1987 – 7 September 2011) was a Russian professional ice hockey player. Churilov played for Lokomotiv Yaroslavl of the Kontinental Hockey League (KHL).

== Death ==
On 7 September 2011, Churilov was killed in the 2011 Lokomotiv Yaroslavl plane crash, when a Yakovlev Yak-42 passenger aircraft, carrying nearly his entire Lokomotiv team, crashed just outside Yaroslavl, Russia. The team was traveling to Minsk to play their opening game of the season, with its coaching staff and prospects. Lokomotiv officials said "'everyone from the main roster was on the plane plus four players from the youth team.'"

== See also ==
- List of ice hockey players who died during their playing career
