= Ivan Tkachenko (ice hockey) =

Russian ice hockey player

- Born: 9 November 1979 Yaroslavl, Soviet Union
- Died: 7 September 2011 (aged 31) Yaroslavl, Russia
- Height: 5 ft 11 in (180 cm)
- Weight: 187 lb (85 kg; 13 st 5 lb)
- Position: left/Right Wing
- Shot: Left
- Played for: HC Neftekhimik Nizhnekamsk (RSL); Lokomotiv Yaroslavl (RSL)/(KHL)
- National team: Russia
- NHL draft: 98th overall, 2002; Columbus Blue Jackets
- Playing career: 1999–2011

Ivan Tkachenko
Medal record

Men's ice hockey

Representing Russia

World Championships
Silver medal – second place	2002 Sweden	

Ivan Leonidovich Tkachenko (Russian: Иван Леонидович Ткаченко) (9 November 1979 – 7 September 2011) was a Russian professional ice hockey winger who played for Lokomotiv Yaroslavl of the Kontinental Hockey League (KHL). He was selected by the Columbus Blue Jackets in the 4th round (98th overall) of the 2002 NHL entry draft.

== Death ==
On 7 September 2011, Tkachenko was killed in the 2011 Lokomotiv Yaroslavl plane crash, when a Yakovlev Yak-42 passenger aircraft carrying nearly his entire Lokomotiv team crashed just outside Yaroslavl, Russia. The team was traveling to Minsk to play their opening game of the season, with its coaching staff and prospects. Lokomotiv officials said, "Everyone from the main roster was on the plane plus four players from the youth team."

== Charity ==
Three weeks after Tkachenko's death, information appeared in the Internet that during the last four years of his life he had anonymously donated almost ten million rubles (over 300,000 US dollars) for the treatment of children suffering from serious diseases. He transferred 500 000 rubles on the day before his death.

== Career statistics ==
=== Regular season and playoffs ===
			Regular season					Playoffs
Season	Team	League	GP	G	A	Pts	PIM	GP	G	A	Pts	PIM
1995–96	Khimik Engels	RUS.2	3	0	0	0	0	—	—	—	—	—
1995–96	Vyatich Tver	RUS.2	21	1	1	2	10	—	—	—	—	—
1996–97	SAK Moscow	RUS.3	34	9	3	12	20	—	—	—	—	—
1996–97	Torpedo–2 Yaroslavl	RUS.3	2	0	0	0	0	—	—	—	—	—
1997–98	Torpedo–2 Yaroslavl	RUS.2	19	3	1	4	4	—	—	—	—	—
1997–98	Torpedo Yaroslavl	RSL	—	—	—	—	—	1	0	0	0	0
1998–99	Torpedo–2 Yaroslavl	RUS.2	28	15	13	28	26	—	—	—	—	—
1999–2000	Torpedo–2 Yaroslavl	RUS.3	1	1	0	1	0	—	—	—	—	—
1999–2000	Motor Zavolzhye	RUS.2	43	15	14	29	22	—	—	—	—	—
1999–2000	Neftekhimik Nizhnekamsk	RSL	5	1	0	1	0	4	0	0	0	0
1999–2000	Neftekhimik–2 Nizhnekamsk	RUS.3	8	6	3	9	24	—	—	—	—	—
2000–01	Neftekhimik Nizhnekamsk	RSL	30	2	2	4	12	4	0	1	1	0
2001–02	Lokomotiv Yaroslavl	RSL	44	13	21	34	57	9	5	2	7	4
2001–02	Lokomotiv–2 Yaroslavl	RUS.3	1	0	1	1	2	—	—	—	—	—
2002–03	Lokomotiv Yaroslavl	RSL	44	11	6	17	57	10	2	3	5	6
2002–03	Lokomotiv–2 Yaroslavl	RUS.3	1	3	0	3	0	—	—	—	—	—
2003–04	Lokomotiv Yaroslavl	RSL	56	7	11	18	22	3	0	0	0	0
2004–05	Lokomotiv Yaroslavl	RSL	59	15	15	30	30	9	2	3	5	8
2005–06	Lokomotiv Yaroslavl	RSL	45	10	21	31	30	11	1	2	3	16
2005–06	Lokomotiv–2 Yaroslavl	RUS.3	1	0	1	1	2	—	—	—	—	—
2006–07	Lokomotiv Yaroslavl	RSL	52	9	24	33	30	7	1	2	3	6
2007–08	Lokomotiv Yaroslavl	RSL	56	14	15	29	34	16	1	3	4	6
2008–09	Lokomotiv Yaroslavl	KHL	56	14	13	27	40	19	3	5	8	10
2009–10	Lokomotiv Yaroslavl	KHL	56	6	16	22	34	17	3	4	7	8
2010–11	Lokomotiv Yaroslavl	KHL	54	11	10	21	43	18	6	3	9	8
RSL totals			391	82	115	197	272	74	12	16	28	46
KHL totals			166	31	39	70	117	54	12	12	24	26

=== International ===
Year	Team	Event	GP	G	A	Pts	PIM
2002	Russia	WC	9	3	2	5	2
Senior totals			9	3	2	5	2

== See also ==
- List of ice hockey players who died during their playing career
