= Mikhail Balandin =

Russian ice hockey player

- Born: July 27, 1980 Lipetsk, Russian SFSR, Soviet Union
- Died: September 7, 2011 (aged 31) Yaroslavl, Russia
- Height: 6 ft 2 in (188 cm)
- Weight: 212 lb (96 kg; 15 st 2 lb)
- Position: Defence
- Shot: Left
- Played for: Lokomotiv Yaroslavl (RSL)/(KHL); Salavat Yulaev Ufa (RSL); HC Lada Togliatti (RSL); HC CSKA Moscow (RSL); Khimik Mytishchi (RSL); Atlant Mytishchi (KHL); UHC Dynamo (KHL)
- NHL draft: Undrafted
- Playing career: 1998–2011

Mikhail Balandin
Medal record

Representing Russia

Ice hockey

World Junior Championships
Silver medal – second place	2000 Sweden	

Mikhail Yuriyevich Balandin (Russian: Михаил Юрьевич Баландин) (July 27, 1980 – September 7, 2011) was a Russian professional ice hockey player. Balandin played for Lokomotiv Yaroslavl of the Kontinental Hockey League (KHL) at the time of his death. Balandin had also played for Salavat Yulaev Ufa, HC Lada Togliatti, HC CSKA Moscow, Khimik Mytishchi, Atlant Mytishchi and UHC Dynamo in Russia. Balandin won a silver medal with the Russian team at the 2000 World Junior Ice Hockey Championships.

== Death ==
On September 7, 2011, Balandin was killed, when a Yakovlev Yak-42 passenger aircraft, carrying nearly his entire Lokomotiv team, crashed just outside Yaroslavl, Russia. The team was traveling to Minsk to play their opening game of the season, with its coaching staff and prospects. Lokomotiv officials said "'everyone from the main roster was on the plane plus four players from the youth team.'"

== Career statistics ==
			Regular season					Playoffs
Season	Team	League	GP	G	A	Pts	PIM	GP	G	A	Pts	PIM
1996–97	Torpedo Yaroslavl-2	Russia3	12	0	2	2	4	—	—	—	—	—
1997–98	Torpedo Yaroslavl-2	Russia2	16	0	0	0	8	—	—	—	—	—
1998–99	Torpedo Yaroslavl-2	Russia2	26	2	5	7	20	—	—	—	—	—
1999–00	Dizel Penza	Russia2	1	0	0	0	0	—	—	—	—	—
1999–00	Krylya Sovetov Moscow	Russia2	27	1	2	3	22	—	—	—	—	—
1999–00	Torpedo Yaroslavl	Russia	3	0	1	1	4	1	0	0	0	0
1999–00	Torpedo Yaroslavl-2	Russia3	4	0	1	1	6	—	—	—	—	—
2000–01	Lokomotiv Yaroslavl	Russia	12	0	0	0	2	10	1	0	1	4
2000–01	Lokomotiv Yaroslavl-2	Russia3	26	4	8	12	36	—	—	—	—	—
2001–02	Salavat Yulaev Ufa	Russia	4	0	1	1	0	—	—	—	—	—
2001–02	Salavat Yulaev Ufa-2	Russia3	6	1	1	2	6	—	—	—	—	—
2001–02	HC Lada Togliatti	Russia	31	3	2	5	8	4	0	1	1	2
2001–02	HC Lada Togliatti-2	Russia3	5	2	0	2	4	—	—	—	—	—
2002–03	Lokomotiv Yaroslavl	Russia	4	0	0	0	2	—	—	—	—	—
2002–03	Lokomotiv Yaroslavl-2	Russia3	1	1	2	3	0	—	—	—	—	—
2002–03	HC Lada Togliatti	Russia	17	0	2	2	6	4	0	1	1	0
2002–03	HC Lada Togliatti-2	Russia3	2	0	0	0	0	—	—	—	—	—
2003–04	HC Lada Togliatti	Russia	58	2	6	8	36	6	1	1	2	0
2003–04	HC Lada Togliatti-2	Russia3	1	0	0	0	2	2	0	0	0	0
2004–05	HC CSKA Moscow	Russia	32	0	8	8	22	—	—	—	—	—
2004–05	HC CSKA Moscow-2	Russia3	1	0	0	0	2	—	—	—	—	—
2005–06	HC CSKA Moscow	Russia	49	2	4	6	40	7	0	0	0	2
2006–07	Khimik Mytishchi	Russia	54	1	9	10	70	9	0	1	1	12
2007–08	Khimik Mytishchi	Russia	50	1	8	9	36	5	0	1	1	4
2007–08	Khimik Mytishchi-2	Russia3	4	1	3	4	4	—	—	—	—	—
2008–09	Atlant Mytishchi	KHL	54	4	15	19	38	7	0	1	1	0
2009–10	Atlant Mytishchi	KHL	55	5	13	18	28	1	0	0	0	0
2010–11	HC Dynamo Moscow	KHL	49	3	11	14	26	5	0	0	0	4
KHL totals			158	12	39	51	92	13	0	1	1	4
Russia totals			314	9	41	50	226	46	2	5	7	24

== See also ==
- List of ice hockey players who died during their playing career
