= Maxim Shuvalov =

Russian ice hockey player

- Born: 23 April 1993 Rybinsk, Russia
- Died: 7 September 2011 (aged 18) Yaroslavl, Russia
- Height: 6 ft 3 in (191 cm)
- Weight: 183 lb (83 kg; 13 st 1 lb)
- Position: Defence
- Shot: Left
- Played for: Lokomotiv Yaroslavl
- NHL draft: Undrafted
- Playing career: 2009–2011

Maxim Shuvalov
Medal record

Representing Russia

Ice hockey

World U18 Championships
Bronze medal – third place	2011 Germany	

Maxim Alexeyevich Shuvalov (Russian: Максим Алексеевич Шувалов; 23 April 1993 – 7 September 2011) was a Russian professional ice hockey player who at the time of his death played for Lokomotiv Yaroslavl of the Kontinental Hockey League.

== Biography ==
Maxim Shuvalov was a player for Russian junior national ice-hockey team. He won a bronze medal at 2011 IIHF World U18 Championships. At the club level, he played for the youth team of Lokomotiv Yaroslavl, Loko. He was transferred to the main team just before the start of the new KHL season.

On 7 September 2011, Shuvalov was killed in the 2011 Lokomotiv Yaroslavl plane crash, when a Yakovlev Yak-42 passenger aircraft, carrying nearly his entire Lokomotiv team, crashed just outside Yaroslavl, Russia. The team was traveling to Minsk to play their opening game of the season, with its coaching staff and prospects. Lokomotiv officials said "'everyone from the main roster was on the plane plus four players from the youth team.'" Aged only 18, he was the youngest member to die in the plane crash.

== See also ==
- List of ice hockey players who died during their playing career
