= Alexander Kalyanin =

Russian ice hockey player

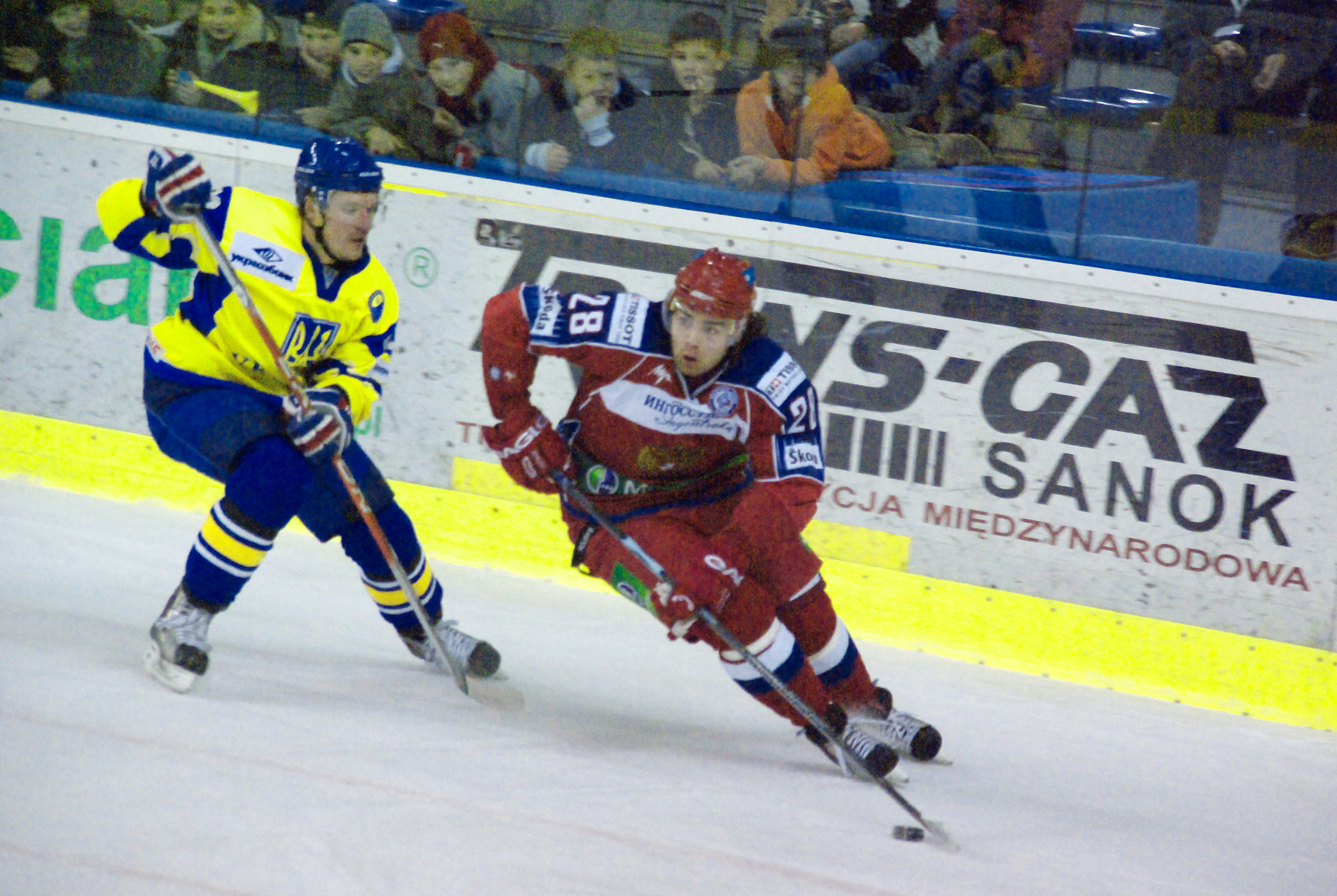
- Born: 24 September 1987 Chelyabinsk, Russian SFSR, Soviet Union
- Died: 7 September 2011 (aged 23) Tunoshna, Yaroslavl, Russia
- Height: 6 ft 1 in (185 cm)
- Weight: 198 lb (90 kg; 14 st 2 lb)
- Position: Right wing
- Shot: Left
- Played for: Traktor Chelyabinsk; Dizel Penza; Lokomotiv Yaroslavl
- National team: Russia
- NHL draft: Undrafted
- Playing career: 2005–2011

Alexander Igorevich Kalyanin (Russian: Александр Игоревич Калянин) (24 September 1987 – 7 September 2011) was a Russian professional ice hockey winger who played for Lokomotiv Yaroslavl of the Kontinental Hockey League (KHL).

== Death ==
On 7 September 2011, Kalyanin, 23, was killed in the 2011 Lokomotiv Yaroslavl plane crash, when a Yakovlev Yak-42 passenger aircraft, carrying nearly his entire Lokomotiv team, crashed just outside Yaroslavl, Russia. The team was traveling to Minsk to play their opening game of the season, with its coaching staff and prospects. Lokomotiv officials said, "'everyone from the main roster was on the plane plus four players from the youth team.'"

== See also ==
- List of ice hockey players who died during their playing career
