= Vitaly Anikeyenko =

- Born: 2 January 1987 Kyiv, Ukrainian SSR, Soviet Union
- Died: 7 September 2011 (aged 24) Yaroslavl, Russia
- Height: 6 ft 3 in (191 cm)
- Weight: 218 lb (99 kg; 15 st 8 lb)
- Position: Defenceman
- Shot: Right
- Played for: Lokomotiv Yaroslavl; Metallurg Novokuznetsk
- NHL draft: 70th overall, 2005; Ottawa Senators
- Playing career: 2005–2011
Medal record
Ice hockey
Representing Russia
World Junior Championships
Silver medal – second place	2007 Sweden
IIHF World U18 Championships
Bronze medal – third place	2003 Russia

Vitaly Serhiiovych Anikeyenko (2 January 1987 – 7 September 2011) was a Ukrainian-Russian professional ice hockey player.

== Life ==
Born in Kyiv, Anikeyenko spent the entirety of his professional hockey career with Lokomotiv Yaroslavl of the Kontinental Hockey League, save for a loan spell with Metallurg Novokuznetsk during 2007–08. He was a member of the Russian national team that competed in the IIHF World Championship's under 18 and under 20 levels; winning a silver medal for the country in 2007. Anikeyenko was drafted 70th overall in the 2005 NHL entry draft by the Ottawa Senators.

== Death ==
On 7 September 2011, Anikeyenko was killed in a plane crash when a Yakovlev Yak-42 passenger aircraft, carrying nearly his entire Lokomotiv Yaroslavl team, crashed at Tunoshna Airport, just outside the city of Yaroslavl, Russia. The team was traveling to Minsk to play their opening game of the season, with its coaching staff and prospects. Lokomotiv officials confirmed that the entire main roster was on the flight, including four players from the junior team. The bodies of Ukrainian teammates Anikeyenko and Daniil Sobchenko were repatriated following the crash for burial in Ukraine. The funeral was held on 10 September at Sovskoe cemetery in Kyiv.

== Career statistics ==
=== Regular season and playoffs ===
			Regular season					Playoffs
Season	Team	League	GP	G	A	Pts	PIM	GP	G	A	Pts	PIM
2002–03	Lokomotiv–2 Yaroslavl	RUS.3	33	0	5	5	30	—	—	—	—	—
2003–04	Lokomotiv–2 Yaroslavl	RUS.3	46	3	9	12	74	—	—	—	—	—
2004–05	Lokomotiv–2 Yaroslavl	RUS.3	63	3	15	18	68	—	—	—	—	—
2005–06	Lokomotiv Yaroslavl	RSL	26	0	1	1	28	1	0	0	0	0
2005–06	Lokomotiv–2 Yaroslavl	RUS.3	22	4	4	8	20	—	—	—	—	—
2006–07	Lokomotiv Yaroslavl	RSL	25	1	2	3	16	3	0	0	0	12
2006–07	Lokomotiv–2 Yaroslavl	RUS.3	19	2	9	11	63	—	—	—	—	—
2007–08	Lokomotiv Yaroslavl	RSL	40	4	9	13	48	16	0	0	0	20
2007–08	Metallurg Novokuznetsk	RSL	10	1	1	2	10	—	—	—	—	—
2008–09	Lokomotiv Yaroslavl	KHL	40	2	9	11	44	19	0	2	2	10
2009–10	Lokomotiv Yaroslavl	KHL	52	7	11	18	50	9	1	0	1	8
2010–11	Lokomotiv Yaroslavl	KHL	52	5	14	19	79	3	0	2	2	4
RSL totals			101	6	13	19	102	20	0	0	0	32
KHL totals			144	14	35	49	174	31	1	4	5	22

=== International ===
Year	Team	Event	Result	GP	G	A	Pts	PIM
2003	Russia	WJC18	3rd place, bronze medalist(s)	6	0	0	0	4
2004	Russia	U17	5th	5	0	3	3	11
2004	Russia	U18	5th	5	1	1	2	6
2005	Russia	WJC18	5th	6	1	1	2	12
2007	Russia	WJC	2nd place, silver medalist(s)	6	0	1	1	10
Junior totals				28	2	6	8	39

== See also ==
- List of ice hockey players who died during their playing career
