= Marat Kalimulin =

Russian ice hockey player

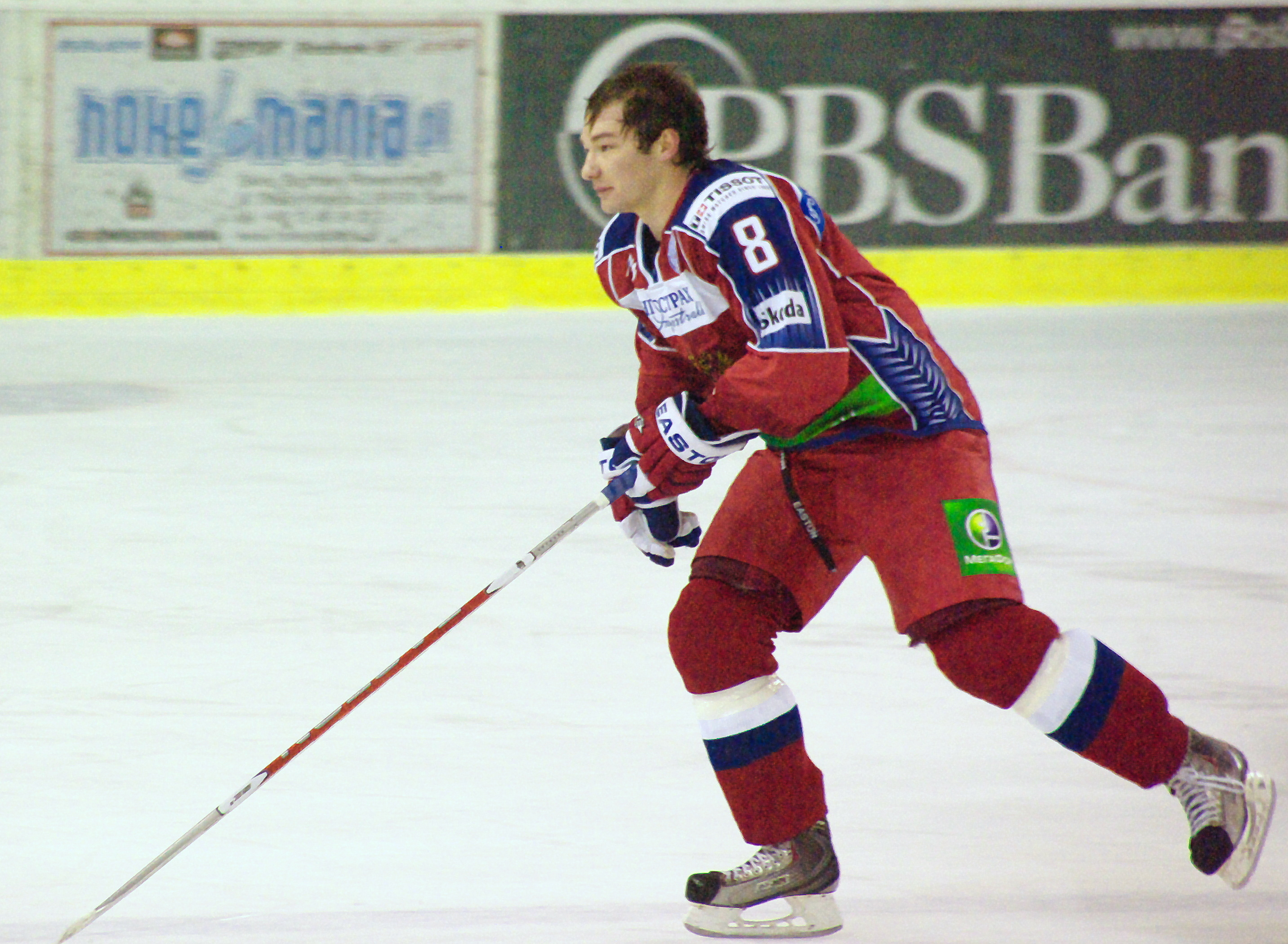
- Born: 20 August 1988 Tolyatti, Russian SFSR, Soviet Union
- Died: 7 September 2011 (aged 23) Yaroslavl, Russia
- Height: 6 ft 0 in (183 cm)
- Weight: 190 lb (86 kg; 13 st 8 lb)
- Position: Defence
- Shot: Right
- Played for: HC Lada Togliatti; Lokomotiv Yaroslavl
- Playing career: 2005–2011

Marat Kalimulin
Medal record

Representing Russia

Ice hockey

World Junior Championships
Bronze medal – third place	2008 Czech Republic	

Marat Natfulovich Kalimulin (Russian: Марат Натфулович Калимулин; 20 August 1988 – 7 September 2011) was a Russian professional ice hockey defenceman who played for Lokomotiv Yaroslavl of the Kontinental Hockey League (KHL). He was killed in the 2011 Lokomotiv Yaroslavl plane crash, in which almost all players and coaches from the club perished.

== Death ==
On 7 September 2011, Kalimulin was killed when a Yakovlev Yak-42 passenger aircraft, carrying nearly his entire Lokomotiv team, crashed just outside Yaroslavl, Russia. The team was traveling to Minsk to play their opening game of the season, with its coaching staff and prospects. Lokomotiv officials said "'everyone from the main roster was on the plane plus four players from the youth team.'"

== Career statistics ==
			Regular season					Playoffs
Season	Team	League	GP	G	A	Pts	PIM	GP	G	A	Pts	PIM
2003–04	HC Lada Togliatti-2	Russia3	9	0	1	1	6	—	—	—	—	—
2004–05	HC Lada Togliatti-2	Russia3	8	0	0	0	4	—	—	—	—	—
2005–06	HC Lada Togliatti	Russia	11	1	0	1	8	—	—	—	—	—
2005–06	HC Lada Togliatti-2	Russia3	25	3	5	8	22	—	—	—	—	—
2006–07	HC Lada Togliatti	Russia	1	0	0	0	0	—	—	—	—	—
2006–07	HC Lada Togliatti-2	Russia3	16	5	6	11	20	—	—	—	—	—
2007–08	HC Lada Togliatti	Russia	41	0	4	4	16	4	0	1	1	2
2009–10	HC Lada Togliatti	KHL	54	3	9	12	36	—	—	—	—	—
2009–10	Ladia Togliatti	MHL	2	1	3	4	0	—	—	—	—	—
2010–11	Lokomotiv Yaroslavl	KHL	48	1	11	12	26	18	1	4	5	2
KHL totals			102	4	20	24	62	18	1	4	5	2

== See also ==
- List of ice hockey players who died during their playing career
