= Andrei Kiryukhin =

Russian ice hockey player

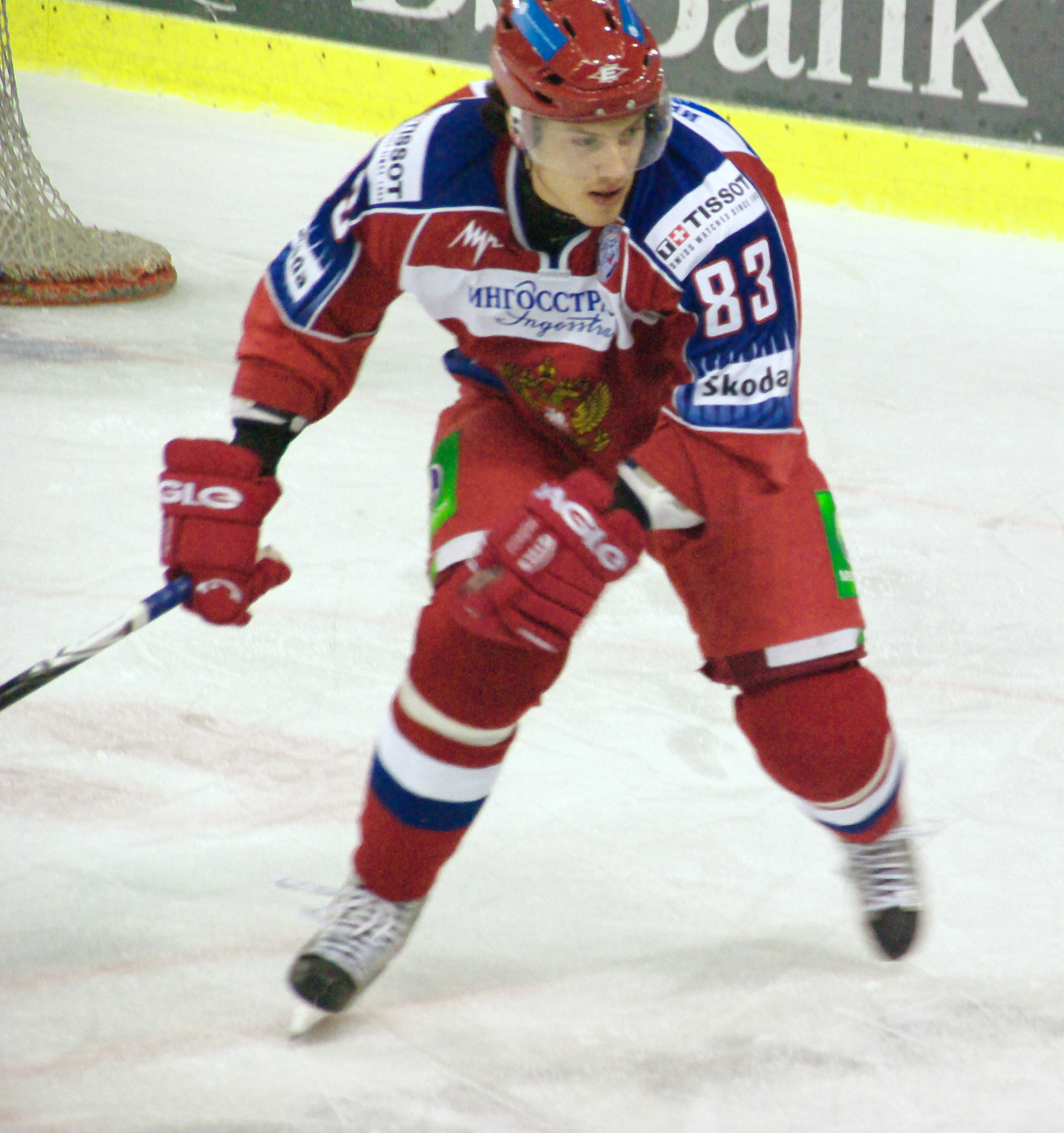
- Born: 4 August 1987 Yaroslavl, Russian SFSR, Soviet Union
- Died: 7 September 2011 (aged 24) Yaroslavl, Russia
- Height: 6 ft 5 in (196 cm)
- Weight: 199 lb (90 kg; 14 st 3 lb)
- Position: Right wing
- Shot: Left
- Played for: Lokomotiv Yaroslavl
- Playing career: 2005–2011

Andrei Kiryukhin
Medal record

Representing Russia

Ice hockey

World Junior Championships
Silver medal – second place	2007 Sweden	

Andrei Anatolievich Kiryukhin (Russian: Андрей Анатольевич Кирюхин; 4 August 1987 – 7 September 2011) was a Russian professional ice hockey winger who played for Lokomotiv Yaroslavl of the Kontinental Hockey League (KHL).

Besides Lokomotiv, he also played for Lokomotiv-2 (its farm team), Belgorod and Kapitan teams. Playing for Russia at the 2007 World Junior Ice Hockey Championships he won a silver medal. His father Anatoly Kiryukhin was a football player and coach.

== Death ==
On 7 September 2011, Kiryukhin was killed in the 2011 Lokomotiv Yaroslavl plane crash, when a Yakovlev Yak-42 passenger aircraft, carrying nearly his entire Lokomotiv team, crashed just outside Yaroslavl, Russia. The team was traveling to Minsk to play their opening game of the season, with its coaching staff and prospects. Lokomotiv officials said "'everyone from the main roster was on the plane plus four players from the youth team.'"

== See also ==
- List of ice hockey players who died during their playing career
