= Ken King (ice hockey) =

Canadian sports executive (1952–2020)

- Born: Kenneth Michael King; January 26, 1952; Davidson, Saskatchewan, Canada
- Died: March 11, 2020 (aged 68); Calgary, Alberta, Canada
- Occupations: President and CEO
- Years active: 2001–2020
- Employer: Calgary Sports and Entertainment
- Spouse: Marilyn Turner
- Children: 2

Kenneth Michael King (January 26, 1952 – March 11, 2020) was a Canadian sports executive. He was the vice chairman of Calgary Sports and Entertainment, as well as alternate governor of the Calgary Flames in the NHL. He was the chairman and governor of the Calgary Stampeders of the Canadian Football League (CFL), and the Calgary Hitmen's governor of the Western Hockey League (WHL).

Ken King died on March 11, 2020, at the age of 68 from lung cancer.

== Awards and honours ==
- 2005 - Alberta Centennial Medal for outstanding contributions to the province of Alberta
- 2012 - Honorary degree from the University of Calgary
- 2014 - Honorary degree from Mount Royal University
