= Pavel Snurnitsyn =

Russian ice hockey player

- Born: 10 January 1992; Yaroslavl, Russia
- Died: 7 September 2011 (aged 19); Yaroslavl, Russia
- Height: 6 ft 2 in (188 cm)
- Weight: 190 lb (86 kg; 13 st 8 lb)
- Position: Forward
- Shot: Left
- Played for: Lokomotiv Yaroslavl
- NHL draft: Undrafted
- Playing career: 2009–2011

Pavel Sergeyevich Snurnitsyn (occasionally spelled Snurnitsin; Russian: Павел Серге́евич Снурницын) (10 January 1992 – 7 September 2011) was a Russian professional ice hockey player who played for Lokomotiv Yaroslavl of the Kontinental Hockey League. In August 2011, Snurnitsyn was among two players from Lokomotiv Yaroslavl selected to play for the Russian Under-20 youth national team of Russia. The team played in the U20 Four Nations Tournament on September 1–3 in Podolsk, Russia. Besides the Russians, Czech Republic, Sweden and Finland participated in the tournament. Snurnitsyn scored two of the goals to beat Finland 11:4.

== Death ==
On 7 September 2011, Snurnitsyn was killed, when a Yakovlev Yak-42 passenger aircraft, carrying nearly his entire Lokomotiv team, crashed just outside Yaroslavl, Russia. The team was traveling to Minsk to play their opening game of the season, with its coaching staff and prospects. Lokomotiv officials said "'everyone from the main roster was on the plane plus four players from the youth team.'"

== See also ==
- List of ice hockey players who died during their playing career
