= Daniil Sobchenko =

Russian ice hockey player

- Born: 13 April 1991 Kyiv, Ukrainian SSR, Soviet Union
- Died: 7 September 2011 (aged 20) Yaroslavl, Russia
- Height: 6 ft 2 in (188 cm)
- Weight: 205 lb (93 kg; 14 st 9 lb)
- Position: Centre
- Shot: Left
- Played for: Lokomotiv Yaroslavl (KHL)
- NHL draft: 166th overall, 2011; San Jose Sharks
- Playing career: 2009–2011

Daniil Sobchenko
Medal record

Representing Russia

Ice hockey

World Junior Championships
Gold medal – first place	2011 United States	

Danylo Yevhenovych "Daniil" Sobchenko (Ukrainian: Данило Євге́нович Собченко; 13 April 1991 – 7 September 2011) was a Ukrainian-born Russian professional ice hockey player. A native of Kyiv, he played his entire professional career with Lokomotiv Yaroslavl in the Kontinental Hockey League (KHL). Internationally, Sobchenko represented Russia at both the IIHF U18 and World Junior Championships, capturing a gold medal with the Russian under-20 team in 2011. That same year, he was selected 166th overall by the San Jose Sharks in the 2011 NHL entry draft. Sobchenko died alongside his Lokomotiv teammates in the 2011 Lokomotiv Yaroslavl plane crash, which occurred on the opening day of the 2011–12 season.

== Death ==
On September 7, 2011, Sobchenko died in an aviation disaster when a Yakovlev Yak-42 passenger aircraft crashed near Tunoshna Airport, just outside Yaroslavl, Russia. The ill-fated flight was transporting nearly the entire Lokomotiv Yaroslavl hockey team to Minsk, where they were scheduled to play their opening game of the 2011–12 Kontinental Hockey League (KHL) season. In addition to the team's main roster, the plane also carried the club's coaching staff and several young prospects from Lokomotiv's junior team. Following the crash, Lokomotiv officials confirmed the heartbreaking news that the entire first-team squad and four junior players were among those on board. In the days that followed, the bodies of Sobchenko and his fellow Ukrainian teammate Vitali Anikeyenko were repatriated to Ukraine. Their joint funeral, attended by family members, friends, teammates, and supporters, was held on September 10, 2011, at the Sovskoe Cemetery in Kyiv.

== Career statistics ==
			Regular season					Playoffs
Season	Team	League	GP	G	A	Pts	PIM	GP	G	A	Pts	PIM
2009–10	Lokomotiv Yaroslavl	KHL	35	5	1	6	6	6	0	0	0	2
2010–11	Lokomotiv Yaroslavl	KHL	16	1	1	2	4	17	0	1	1	18
KHL totals			51	6	2	8	10	11	0	1	1	16

== See also ==
- List of ice hockey players who died during their playing career
