= Yuri Urychev =

Russian ice hockey player (1991–2011)

- Born: 3 April 1991 Yaroslavl, Russian SFSR, Soviet Union
- Died: 7 September 2011 (aged 20) Yaroslavl, Russia
- Height: 6 ft 4.5 in (194 cm)
- Weight: 209 lb (95 kg; 14 st 13 lb)
- Position: Defence
- Shot: Right
- Played for: Lokomotiv Yaroslavl
- NHL draft: Undrafted
- Playing career: 2009–2011

Yuri Urychev
Medal record

Representing Russia

Ice hockey

World Junior Championships
Gold medal – first place	2011 United States	

Yuri Olegovich Urychev (Russian: Юрий Олегович Урычев; 3 April 1991 – 7 September 2011) was a Russian professional ice hockey player who at the time of his death played for Lokomotiv Yaroslavl of the Kontinental Hockey League.

== Death ==
On 7 September 2011, Urychev was killed when a Yakovlev Yak-42 passenger aircraft, carrying nearly his entire Lokomotiv team, crashed just outside Yaroslavl, Russia. The team was traveling to Minsk to play their opening game of the season, with its coaching staff and prospects. Lokomotiv officials said "'everyone from the main roster was on the plane plus four players from the youth team."

He was injured and serving a suspension at the time and was not originally scheduled to fly to the game, but he volunteered to go to support the team even though he wouldn't be able to play.

== See also ==
- List of ice hockey players who died during their playing career
