= 1958–59 MJHL season =

Manitoba ice hockey season

1958–59 Manitoba Junior Hockey League season

== League notes ==
The Brandon Wheat Kings return after a four-year absence.
Wayne Larkin (Braves) equals a league record by scoring 6 goals in a game.
The League announced that since league standings cannot be effected, the balance of the 32 game regular season is cancelled.

== Regular season ==
League Standings	GP	W	L	T	Pts	GF	GA
Winnipeg Braves	31	22	7	2	46	177	111
St. Boniface Canadiens	31	21	8	2	44	143	96
Brandon Wheat Kings	30	15	14	1	31	152	122
Transcona Rangers	32	10	19	3	23	110	166
Winnipeg Monarchs	30	5	25	0	10	89	176

== Playoffs ==
Semi-Finals

Braves defeated Brandon 3-games-to-none
St. Boniface defeated Transcona 3-games-to-none with 1 game tied

Turnbull Cup Championship

Braves defeated St. Boniface 4-games-to-1

Western Memorial Cup Semi-Final

Braves defeated Fort William Canadiens (TBJHL) 4-games-to-1

Western Memorial Cup Final (Abbott Cup)

Braves defeated Flin Flon Bombers (SJHL) 4-games-to-2

Memorial Cup Championship

Braves defeated Peterborough TPT Petes (OHA) 4-games-to-1

== Awards ==
Trophy	Winner	Team
MVP		
Top Goaltender	Paul Sexsmith	St. Boniface Canadiens
Scoring Champion	Laurie Langrell	Winnipeg Braves
Most Goals	Laurie Langrell	Winnipeg Braves
