= Wayne Larkin =

Canadian ice hockey player

- Born: November 10, 1938 Winnipeg, Manitoba, Canada
- Died: September 13, 1968 (aged 29)
- Height: 5 ft 10 in (178 cm)
- Weight: 165 lb (75 kg; 11 st 11 lb)
- Position: Left wing
- Shot: Left
- Played for: Cleveland Barons; Springfield Indians; Providence Reds; Buffalo Bisons
- Playing career: 1958–1968

Wayne Larkin (November 10, 1938 – September 13, 1968) was a Canadian ice hockey left winger.

== Career ==
Larkin played eight seasons in the American Hockey League for the Cleveland Barons, Springfield Indians, Providence Reds and the Buffalo Bisons. He also played in the Western Hockey League for the Winnipeg Warriors and Vancouver Canucks, and in the International Hockey League for the St. Paul Saints.

== Awards and achievements ==
- Turnbull Cup MJHL Championship (1959)
- Memorial Cup Championship (1959)
- Honoured Member of the Manitoba Hockey Hall of Fame

== See also ==
- List of ice hockey players who died during their playing career
