= 1957–58 MJHL season =

Manitoba ice hockey season

== League notes ==
The League admits the Winnipeg Braves.
The Winnipeg Barons Fold.
The Winnipeg Rangers move to Brandon, becoming the Brandon Rangers.
In January, the Rangers move back and are named the Transcona Rangers.

== Regular season ==
League Standings	GP	W	L	T	Pts	GF	GA
Winnipeg Monarchs	30	18	11	1	37	167	127
St. Boniface Canadiens	30	17	11	2	36	146	132
Winnipeg Braves	30	13	16	1	27	146	135
Transcona Rangers	30	10	20	0	20	128	193

== Playoffs ==
Semi-Final

St. Boniface defeated Braves 3-games-to-2

Turnbull Cup Championship

Monarchs lost to St. Boniface 4-games-to-3

Western Memorial Cup Semi-Final

St. Boniface defeated Fort William Canadiens (TBJHL) 4-games-to-1

Western Memorial Cup Final (Abbott Cup)

St. Boniface lost to Regina Pats (SJHL) 4-games-to-2

== Awards ==
Trophy	Winner	Team
MVP	Gord Labossiere	Transcona Rangers
Top Goaltender		
Scoring Champion	Gord Labossiere	Transcona Rangers
Most Goals	Gord Labossiere	Transcona Rangers

== All-Star teams ==
First All-Star Team
Goaltender	Ron Mathers	Winnipeg Monarchs
Defencemen	Bill McDowell	Winnipeg Monarchs
Defencemen	Connie Neil	Transcona Rangers
Centreman	Gord Labossiere	Transcona Rangers
Leftwinger	Laurie Langrell	Winnipeg Braves
Rightwinger	Claude Normandeau	St. Boniface Canadiens
Coach	Bill Allum	Winnipeg Braves
Manager	Lloyd Frihager	St. Boniface Canadiens
Second All-Star Team
Goaltender	Don Shalley	St. Boniface Canadiens
Defencemen	Ted Lanyon	St. Boniface Canadiens
Defencemen	Bob Donas	St. Boniface Canadiens
Centreman	Bill Saunders	Winnipeg Monarchs
Leftwinger	Al LeBlanc	Winnipeg Braves
Rightwinger	Bill Colpitts	Winnipeg Monarchs
Coach	Bill Leask	Winnipeg Monarchs
Manager	Ray Frost	Transcona Rangers
