= 2015 Oklahoma State University homecoming parade attack =

Fatal vehicle rampage in Oklahoma, US

- Date: October 24, 2015; 10 years ago
- Time: 10:31 a.m. CDT
- Location: Hall of Fame Avenue & Main Street, Stillwater, Oklahoma; 36°07′36.7″N 97°03′31.3″W
- Type: Vehicle-ramming attack, mass murder
- Motive: Suicidal ideation
- Deaths: 4
- Injuries: 47
- Convicted: Adacia Chambers
- Charges: Four counts of second-degree murder, 39 charges of assault

On October 24, 2015, a vehicle-ramming attack took place during a parade in Stillwater, Oklahoma, United States. The local campus of Oklahoma State University was holding a homecoming celebration when 25-year-old Adacia Chambers intentionally drove her sedan into the crowd. Four people were killed in the crash, and 47 others were reported injured. Chambers pleaded no contest to second-degree murder and assault charges, and was sentenced to life imprisonment.

== Attack ==
The incident occurred at 10:31 a.m. Central Time (15:31 UTC), during Oklahoma State University's annual Sea of Orange Homecoming Parade, which was being held that morning, leading up to that day's football game between the Oklahoma State Cowboys and the Kansas Jayhawks. After the parade had crossed the intersection of Hall of Fame Avenue and Main Streets (0.40 miles (0.64 km) east of Boone Pickens Stadium) on the university campus, where the parade was supposed to conclude, Adacia Avery Chambers (born May 17, 1990) – a native of Oologah and resident of Stillwater – drove her gray 2014 Hyundai Elantra south on Main at speeds above 40 miles per hour (64 km/h) into several barriers used to block off commuter traffic and then proceeded to hit an unmanned motorcycle belonging to the Stillwater Police Department, which was providing security assistance for the event; Chambers' car then careened into approximately 50 parade spectators before stopping when its two front tires popped the curb on the southwest corner of the intersection.

Local paramedics and firefighters participating in the parade immediately began tending to those who were injured.

== Victims ==
Three of the victims who were hit by Chambers' vehicle in the collision – 23-year-old Nikita Prabhaker Nakal, a native of Mumbai, India, who was an attending senior at the University of Central Oklahoma in Edmond; and husband and wife Marvin Lyle and Bonnie Jean Stone, both age 65 and residing in Stillwater – died at the scene; 2-year-old Nash Lucas, also of Stillwater, suffered severe injuries and died while being treated at The Children's Hospital at OU Medicine in Oklahoma City hours after the crash (his mother was among those injured in the crash).

Forty-seven other people – including nine children between the ages of 1 and 13 – were admitted for various injuries at Stillwater Medical Center; OU Medical Center and The Children's Hospital in Oklahoma City; and St. Johns Medical Center in Tulsa. The intersection was subsequently blocked off by Stillwater and university law enforcement.

== Legal proceedings ==
Chambers was arrested near the crash site by Stillwater Police Department officers present at the scene of the accident on suspicion of driving under the influence; she was later placed into a detox unit in the Payne County Jail. Results of blood tests to gauge the levels of any alcohol or narcotic intoxicants in Chambers' body – a requirement for police to administer for "serious" vehicle accidents involving a fatality under Oklahoma state law – revealed she had a blood alcohol level of .01, not enough to be charged with driving under the influence. Chambers was arraigned at Payne County District Court on October 26, with any additional charges against her pending further investigation into the cause of the collision that is presented to the Payne County District Attorney's office. Chambers was charged with four counts of second-degree murder and 46 charges of assault. Her bail was set at $1 million. Her trial was scheduled to begin January 10, 2017. On January 10, 2017, she was sentenced to life in prison after accepting a plea deal.

On January 10, 2017, Adacia Avery Chambers pleaded no contest to four counts of second-degree murder and 39 counts of assault and battery by means or force likely to produce death. Chambers received life in prison for each murder count, to be served concurrently, and 10 years in prison for each assault count, to also be served concurrently. The plea agreement ensures Chambers will serve a 55-year sentence and will not leave prison until her early 70s, pending parole for both the life sentence and assault sentence. She remains incarcerated at the Mabel Bassett Correctional Center near McLoud, Oklahoma.

== Reactions ==
During a press conference on the crash held that afternoon, Burns Hargis, president of Oklahoma State University, stated, "Tragically we lost three. I hope we don't lose anymore. [...] The Cowboy family pulls together, unfortunately, we’ve had to do it before, and we're going to do it again." Stillwater mayor Gina Noble, who had served as the parade's grand marshal, later remarked that "We are heartbroken at this tragedy." Noble later commented, "We’ve never seen anything like this. [...] We’re shocked. We are definitely subdued in mood and we’re still trying to understand. [...] We will get through this together and figure out how to help those who need the help."

The homecoming football game between Oklahoma State and Kansas – in which the Cowboys defeated the Jayhawks, 58-10 – was played as scheduled at 2:30 p.m. that afternoon; a pep rally originally set to be held before the game was cancelled, however. Before the game (which was televised nationally on FS1), Oklahoma Governor Mary Fallin, an alumna of the university who was in attendance at the game, led players and spectators in a moment of prayer as the United States flag flew at half staff in Boone Pickens Stadium.

Fallin expressed condolences during a press conference that occurred during halftime of the game, "Our hearts and prayers go out with those who lost loved ones today, to those that were injured in the tragedy," and referenced the two previous tragedies involving the university during the past 14 years (the January 2001 plane crash that killed ten members of the Cowboys basketball team and the November 2011 plane crash that killed four people, including Cowgirls basketball head coach Kurt Budke and assistant coach Miranda Serna), adding "One thing I do know about Oklahoma people. They’re strong. They're very compassionate. They believe in prayer. They believe in comforting people and helping during a time of crisis and need. We’ll get through this again. But certainly it’s a very painful experience for those of us here, and certainly for all Oklahomans."
