= 2011 Arkansas Piper Cherokee crash =

Aviation accident

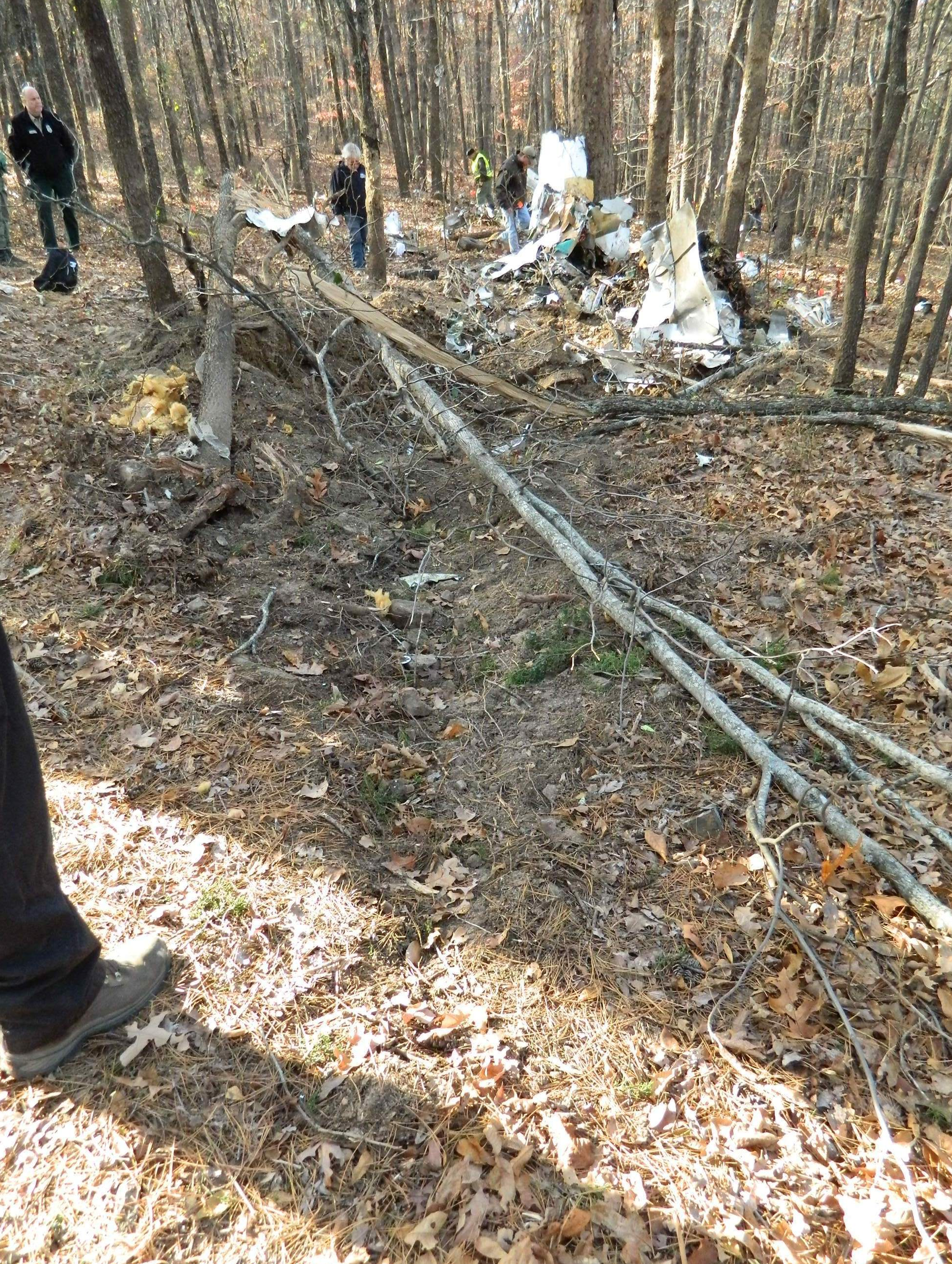
- The impact crater and wreckage of the aircraft

Accident
- Date: November 17, 2011
- Summary: Uncontrolled descent into terrain for unknown reasons
- Site: Ouachita National Forest, 8 miles SW of Perryville, Arkansas, US; 34.918°N 92.906°W

Aircraft
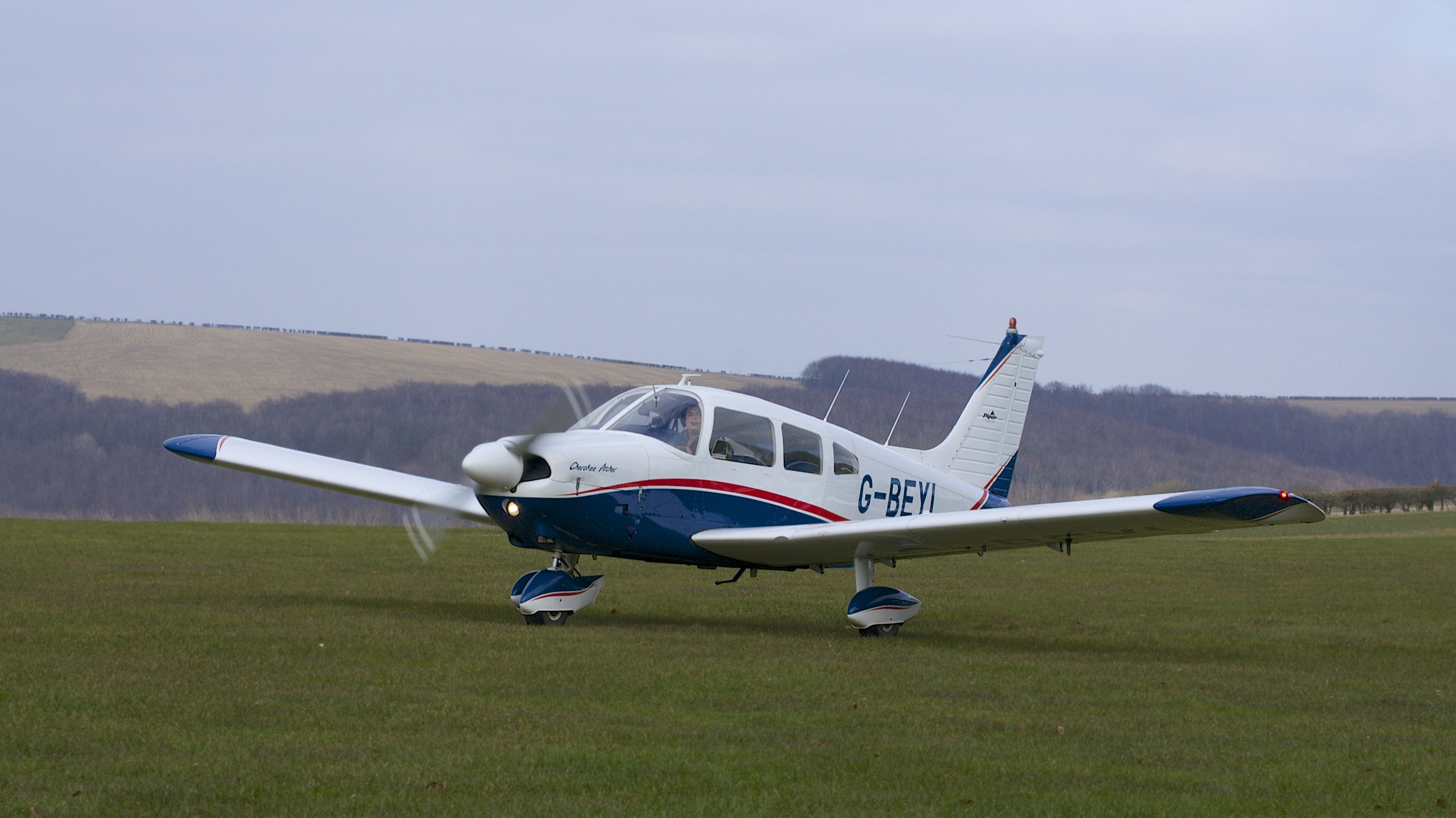
- A PA-28, similar to the aircraft involved
- Aircraft type: Piper PA-28-180 Cherokee
- Registration: N7746W
- Flight origin: Stillwater Regional Airport, Stillwater, Oklahoma, US
- Destination: North Little Rock Municipal Airport, North Little Rock, Arkansas, US
- Occupants: 4
- Passengers: 3
- Crew: 1
- Fatalities: 4
- Survivors: 0

On November 17, 2011, Kurt Budke, head coach of Oklahoma State University's women's basketball team, died when the Piper Cherokee light aircraft he was traveling in crashed near Perryville, Arkansas, killing all four people on board. The airplane was piloted by former Oklahoma State Senator Olin Branstetter.

The subsequent investigation concluded that the pilot lost control of the aircraft, but the cause of the loss of control was undetermined. It was the second plane crash in 10 years to involve an Oklahoma State basketball team, after the 2001 accident in which two players on the men's team, six staff, and both pilots lost their lives.

== Background ==
Olin Branstetter, an 82-year-old former Oklahoma State graduate and contributor to the university, was a certified commercial pilot with over 2,200 flight hours logged, and was the owner of N7746W, a single-engine, four-seat Piper PA-28-180 Cherokee built in 1964. The aircraft had accumulated 5,800 hours of flight, and its last annual inspection was completed a week before the accident.

On November 17, 2011, Branstetter was flying head coach Kurt Budke and assistant coach Miranda Serna on a 'donor flight' from Stillwater, Oklahoma, to North Little Rock, Arkansas, to scout two prospective high school recruits.

On board was also Branstetter's wife, Paula, 79, a certified private pilot. On the accident flight, she was seated in the rear with Serna, while Budke sat on the front next to the pilot.

== Accident ==
The PA-28 arrived at Stillwater Regional Airport at around 13:45. After picking up Budke and Serna, it took off half an hour later for North Little Rock. The weather was good, and no meteorological hazards were forecasted along the planned route.

About two hours after departure, radar data showed the airplane flying level at 7,000 feet over the Ouachita National Forest, Arkansas, on a south-easterly heading. At 16:10, the airplane entered a right turn and started descending, disappearing from radar shortly after. There were no communications between the airplane and air traffic control.

Hunters on the ground near the accident site reported seeing the airplane flying at a low altitude while making turns, before nosediving into a heavily wooded area. They then alerted emergency services.

The wreckage of N7746W was found mostly contained in an impact crater about 10 feet in diameter and 3.5 feet deep. Ground scars and witness marks on nearby trees indicated that the airplane had hit the ground with a 50° to 60° nose-down attitude.

== Investigation ==
The National Transportation Safety Board (NTSB) investigated the crash and released its report in February 2013. It concluded that Branstetter had lost control of the aircraft, although the reason for the loss of control could not be determined.

The investigators did not find any pre-impact anomalies with the engine or airframe that would have precluded normal operation of the aircraft. No flight recorders were installed on board, as they were not required. Weather was also ruled out as a factor.

The condition of the pilot's remains did not allow for identification of any medical conditions that may have contributed to the crash. It was not possible to perform forensic toxicology tests to detect carbon monoxide nor cyanide poisoning. However, tests for ethanol and drugs returned negative.

== Aftermath ==
Oklahoma State students, players, and staff wore ribbons with the number 4 and the victims' initials in remembrance. A memorial was set up inside the Gallagher-Iba Arena, Oklahoma State's basketball venue, bearing semblance to those ribbons. Assistant coach Jim Littell was named Cowgirls' interim head coach and the team's following two games were canceled.

After the 2001 accident, the university had introduced rules to prevent players from traveling on single-engine planes. Following Budke's death, OSU expanded the rule to include coaches and staff, also mandating that pilots and aircraft be reviewed by an aviation consultant.

The family of Budke received workers' compensation from the university, while the families of both coaches reached a settlement with the estate of the pilot and his wife in July 2014.

== See also ==
- Oklahoma State Cowboys basketball team plane crash
- List of accidents involving sports teams
