= List of accidents involving sports teams =

More than 60 accidents have killed or injured all or part of a sports team, in team-related circumstances that often receive widespread publicity. This list is organized into two sortable tables, summarizing aviation accidents and non-aviation accidents. The list does not attempt to include non-accidents (e.g. injuries while practicing their sport or targeted violent attacks), or non-team circumstances (i.e. athletes or sports personnel who experienced individual accidents).

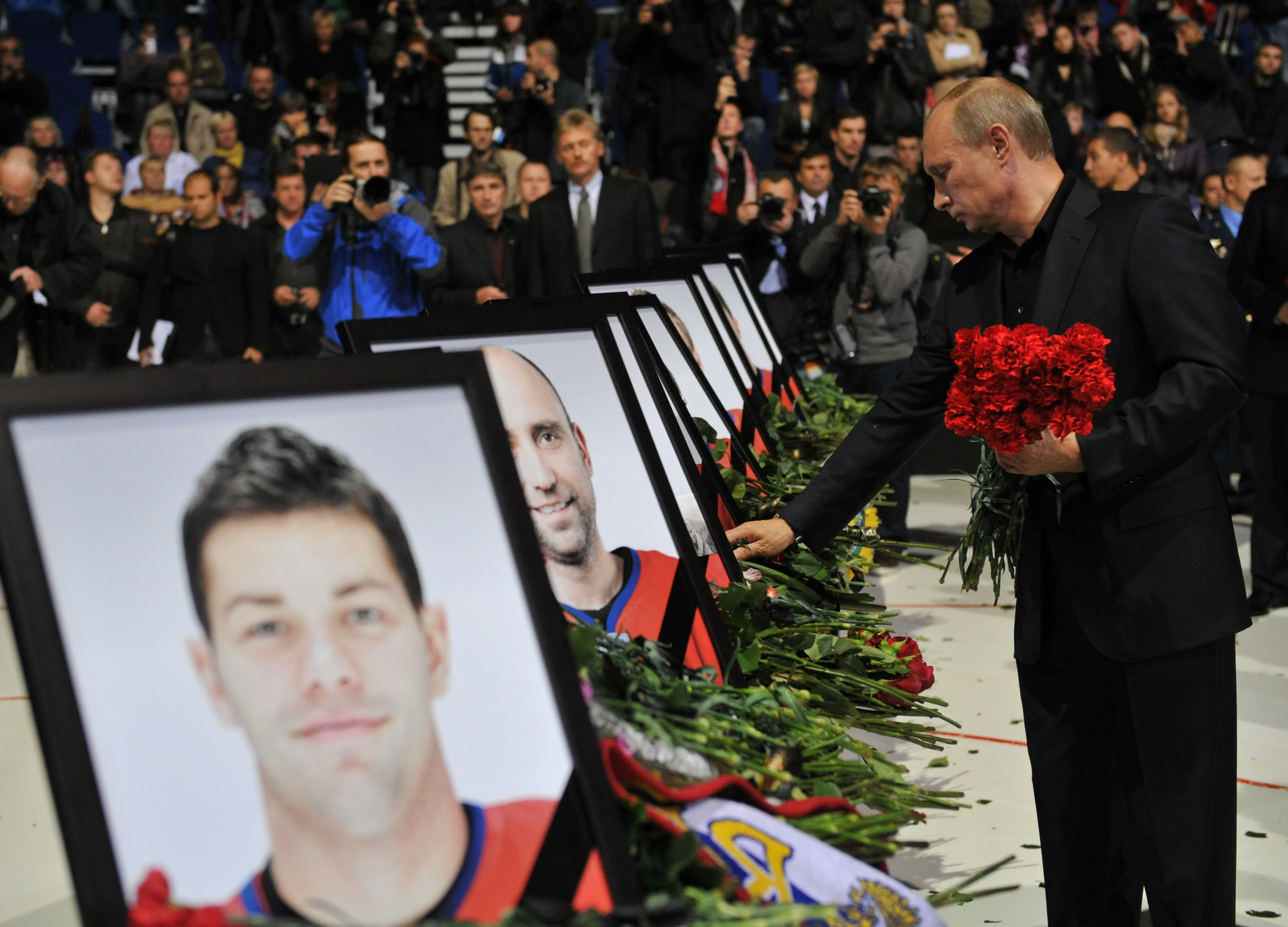
Vladimir Putin at the funeral for the Lokomotiv hockey team

The deadliest known accident for a single team was a November 1970 plane crash in West Virginia, whose fatalities included 37 members and 5 coaches of the Marshall University football team. Aviation accidents involving sports teams have decreased substantially since peaking in the 1970s, in parallel with peacetime aviation accidents overall. Serious non-aviation team accidents have most commonly involved buses, but also other modes of transportation and non-transport factors.

In response to team accidents, several sports leagues have established procedures for a "disaster draft", a contingency plan for rebuilding a team if many players are killed or disabled. The Kontinental Hockey League implemented such a plan in 2011 when the Lokomotiv Yaroslavl plane crash in Russia killed 26 players and 3 coaches.

== Casualties from aviation accidents ==
Date (incident)	Team	Sport	Airline	Aircraft	Location	Fatalities		Description	Ref.
Date (incident)	Team	Sport	Airline	Aircraft	Location	Total	Team	Description	Ref.
31 March 1931	Notre Dame	American football	Transcontinental & Western Air	Fokker F-10	Bazaar, Kansas, United States	8	1	Famed football coach Knute Rockne killed, when a wooden wing failed.	
31 March 1933	Winnipeg Toilers	Basketball	Private plane	Ford Tri-Motor	Neodesha, Kansas, United States	6	2	Crashed into a field attempting a forced landing on a flight from Tulsa.	
8 November 1948	Czechoslovak national ice hockey team	Ice hockey	Escadrille Mercure Taxis Aeriens	Beechcraft C18S	English Channel	8	6	Six players of Czechoslovak national ice hockey team including Ladislav Troják were killed on their way to Great Britain.	
4 May 1949	Torino FC	Association football	Avio Linee Italiane	Fiat G212CP	Superga, Turin, Italy	31	23	18 players of the Grande Torino and five club officials were killed when the plane crashed on its landing approach to the Turin airport.	
7 January 1950	VVS Moscow	Ice hockey	Soviet Air Force	Lisunov Li-2	Sverdlovsk, Soviet Union	19	13	Almost the entire team was killed in a fifth attempt to land at Koltsovo Airport in Sverdlovsk (modern-day Yekaterinburg), during a heavy snowstorm with strong winds. Some sources give the crash date as 5 January.	
24 November 1956	TJ Baník Chomutov	Ice hockey	Czechoslovak Airlines	Ilyushin Il-12B	Eglisau, Switzerland	23	5	Three players, two top club officials and a reporter were among others on the scheduled flight from Zurich to Prague, which crashed in fields after an engine failure. All on board perished.	
9 December 1956	Saskatchewan Roughriders, Winnipeg Blue Bombers	Canadian football	Trans-Canada Air Lines	Canadair North Star	Chilliwack, British Columbia, Canada	62	5	Five players were killed returning from that year's all-star game in Vancouver. The plane crashed into Mount Slesse near Chilliwack after encountering severe icing and turbulence over the mountains.	
6 February 1958	Manchester United	Association football	British European Airways	Airspeed AS-57 Ambassador	Munich, West Germany	23	11	Eight players and three club staff members were killed when their plane's takeoff failed during a snowstorm, after a Munich stopover from a match in Belgrade. Manager Matt Busby and nine players survived, including two with career-ending injuries.	
14 August 1958	Egypt national fencing team	Fencing	KLM	Lockheed L-1049 Super Constellation	Atlantic Ocean off Ireland	99	6	Six players killed; possible propeller failure.	
16 July 1960	Danish Olympic football triallists	Association football	Zone-Redningskorpset	De Havilland Dragon Rapide	Copenhagen, Denmark	8	8	Eight players killed in a botched takeoff.	
29 October 1960	California Polytechnic State University	American football	Arctic Pacific	Curtiss C-46 Commando	Toledo, Ohio, United States	22	17	16 players and a student manager were killed, when their plane crashed shortly after takeoff.	
15 February 1961	US Figure Skating	Figure skating	Sabena	Boeing 707	Brussels, Belgium	73	25	Entire team killed while en route to the World Figure Skating Championships in Prague, Czechoslovakia. Likely mechanical failure during the plane's landing approach.	
3 April 1961	Green Cross	Association football	LAN Chile	Douglas C-47	Andes Mountains, Chile	24	8	Eight members of the team killed in unexplained crash.	
6 February 1965	Antonio Varas (Santiago)	Association football	LAN Chile	Douglas DC-6	Andes Mountains, Chile	87	22	22 players and staff of team killed, from pilot error in the Andes.	
28 January 1966	Italy national swimming team	Swimming	Lufthansa	Convair CV-440	Bremen, West Germany	46	8	Eight members of team were killed, in a failed landing.	
28 April 1968	Lamar Tech track team	Athletics	Private plane	Beechcraft Model 65 Queen Air	Beaumont, Texas, United States	7	6	Failed landing killed 5 team members, the coach, and the pilot after a possible heart attack.	
26 September 1969	The Strongest	Association football	Lloyd Aéreo Boliviano	Douglas DC-6	Viloco, Bolivia	74	20	17 players and three team staff members were killed, in a crash attributed to pilot error.	
15 February 1970	Puerto Rico women's national volleyball team	Volleyball	Dominicana de Aviación	McDonnell Douglas DC-9	Caribbean Sea near Las Américas Int'l Airport	102	12	The head coach and eleven players were killed when the plane crashed shortly after takeoff, likely due to water-contaminated fuel.	
1 April 1970	Novosibirsk youth ice hockey team	Ice hockey	Aeroflot	Antonov An-24B	Toguchin vicinity, Soviet Union	45	c. 20	Caused by a nighttime collision with a weather balloon. The team was on its way to the Golden Puck tournament. There were no survivors.	
2 October 1970	Wichita State University	American football	Golden Eagle Aviation	Martin 4-0-4	Clear Creek County, Colorado, United States	31	15	14 players and coach Ben Wilson were killed by a mountainside crash, in one of two planes en route to a game vs. Utah State University. Another plane with reserve players and assistant coaches landed safely in Utah.	
14 November 1970	Marshall University	American football	Southern Airways	McDonnell Douglas DC-9	Wayne County, West Virginia, United States	75	42	37 team members, 5 coaches, and 7 staff members were among the passengers killed as their plane hit the tree line and exploded during final approach to Huntington/Tri-State Airport. The team was returning to campus after a game at East Carolina University.	
13 October 1972	Old Christians Club	Rugby union	Uruguayan Air Force	Fairchild FH-227	Andes Mountains, Argentina	29	12	Plane crashed from navigation error, high in the remote Andes. 29 deaths included 11 rugby players and the team physician. 16 starving survivors cannibalized the dead, until rescue on 21–23 December.	
28 February 1973	Kyzylorda Region women's basketball team	Basketball	Aeroflot	Yakovlev Yak-40	Semipalatinsk Airport, Soviet Union	32	13	11 players, coach, referee; plane crashed shortly after takeoff.	
3 March 1974	Bury St Edmunds Rugby Club	Rugby union	Turkish Airlines	McDonnell Douglas DC-10	Ermenonville Forest, France	346	18	18 rugby players and an Olympic track medalist were among the 346 occupants killed shortly after takeoff from Paris, when a faulty cargo door blew out, decompressed the plane, and severed control of the tail section.	
13 February 1975	Västra Frölunda IF	Ice hockey	Baron Air	Cessna 402	Gävle, Sweden	0	0	Frölunda chartered three planes to carry the team. Seven players were injured when Baron Air SE-GGN crashed.	
29 November 1975	Embassy Racing With Graham Hill	Auto racing	Grand Prix (Bahamas) Ltd	Piper PA-23	North London, England	6	6	Six team members were killed while returning from a test session at Circuit Paul Ricard in France. The dead included recently-retired double Formula One champion Graham Hill (who piloted the plane) and driver Tony Brise.	
6 October 1976	Cuba national fencing team	Fencing	Cubana de Aviación	Douglas DC-8	Atlantic Ocean off Barbados	73	24	24 members of the 1975 Cuban national fencing team were all killed as a result of a pair of bombs on board.	
13 December 1977	University of Evansville	Basketball	Air Indiana	DC-3	Evansville, Indiana, United States	29	19	Entire team (save one player) and coaching staff, along with members of the press, boosters, and plane crew, were all killed in a crash shortly after takeoff from Evansville en route to a game against Middle Tennessee State University. The sole team member who did not board the plane died in a car crash two weeks later.	
16 March 1978	Bulgarian rhythmic gymnastics team; Polish track cycling team	Rhythmic gymnastics; Cycle racing	Balkan Bulgarian Airlines	Tupolev Tu-134	Gabare, Bulgaria	73	11	5 Bulgarian gymnasts with coach; 5 Polish cyclists; suspected military responsibility	
11 August 1979	Pakhtakor Tashkent	Association football	Aeroflot	Tupolev Tu-134	Dniprodzerzhynsk, Soviet Union	178	17	Team killed in mid-air collision. Two air traffic controllers received long prison sentences.	
14 March 1980	USA Boxing team	Boxing	LOT Polish Airlines	Ilyushin Il-62	Warsaw, Poland	87	14	Killed 14 American boxers and 8 staff members; engine shattered during landing approach.	
25 November 1985	Iowa State Cyclones women's cross country team	Cross country running	Private plane	Aero Commander twin-engine	Des Moines, Iowa, United States	7	6	All aboard were killed, returning from the NCAA Championships. Other cross-country team members and coaching staff were aboard two other planes, which safely made the trip the same night.	
8 December 1987	Alianza Lima	Association football	Peruvian Navy	Fokker F27	Pacific Ocean near Lima, Peru	42	17	16 players, coach Marcos Calderón, 12 team staff, and 8 cheerleaders among the dead, due to pilot errors on landing approach.	
7 June 1989	Colourful 11	Association football	Surinam Airways	Douglas DC-8	Paramaribo, Suriname	176	15	Pilot errors on landing approach; 14 players and their coach died; 3 players survived with career-ending injuries.	
27 April 1993	Zambia national football team	Association football	Zambian Air Force	De Havilland Canada DHC-5 Buffalo	Atlantic Ocean off Gabon	30	20	All aboard were killed when the plane crashed shortly after takeoff, including 18 players and 2 coaches. Several team members were not on the flight.	
18 September 1994	Iwuanyanwu Nationale	Association football	Oriental Airways	BAC One-Eleven	Tamanrasset, Algeria	5	2	Two players on the Nigerian team Iwuanyanwu Nationale (now Heartland FC) and three crew members were killed, when their charter aircraft crashed on landing in Algeria for a stopover on their return flight from Tunisia to Nigeria.	
27 January 2001	Oklahoma State University	Basketball	Charter flight	Beechcraft Super King Air	Strasburg, Colorado, United States	10	2	Two players killed, as well as some team staff and media	
24 October 2004	Hendrick Motorsports	Auto racing	Charter flight	Beechcraft Super King Air	Martinsville, Virginia, United States	10	3	All aboard were killed, including race team president John Hendrick, chief engine builder Randy Dorton, and former driver Ricky Hendrick.	
30 March 2008	Apex Motorsports	Auto racing	Charter flight	Cessna Citation 501	Farnborough, London, England	5	3	All killed including team manager (Richard Lloyd), driver (David Leslie) and their data engineer.	
24 August 2008	Kyrgyzstan junior men's volleyball team	Volleyball	Iran Aseman Airlines	Boeing 737-200	Bishkek, Kyrgyzstan	65	10	10 players killed when the pilot unsuccessfully tried to return to the airport after finding a door improperly sealed.	
15 July 2009	Iran national youth judo team	Judo	Caspian Airlines	Tupolev Tu-154M	Qazvin, Iran	168	10	Killed all aboard, including 8 athletes and 2 coaches; engine shattered after takeoff.	
7 September 2011	Lokomotiv Yaroslavl	Ice hockey	Yak-Service	Yakovlev Yak-42	Yaroslavl, Russia	44	29	26 players and 3 coaches killed in a botched takeoff.	
28 November 2016	Chapecoense	Association football	LaMia, Bolivian charter flight	Avro RJ85 (BAe 146)	La Unión, Antioquia, Colombia	71	20	Plane ran out of fuel and crashed near Medellín, Colombia, en route to the Copa Sudamericana Finals. Among those killed were 19 players and their coach, many staff members, officials and journalists. Three players survived the crash, one with a career-ending injury.	
24 January 2021	Palmas	Association football	Charter flight	Beechcraft Baron	Porto Nacional, Tocantins, Brazil	6	5	Crashed at Luzimangues, a district of Porto Nacional, Tocantins, Brazil. Four players and the president of the Brazilian club Palmas were killed, traveling for the Copa Verde tournament.	
29 January 2025	US Figure Skating	Figure skating	American Eagle	Bombardier CRJ701ER	Washington, DC, United States	67	15	Collided with an Army helicopter while landing, with both aircraft plunging into the Potomac River. Passengers included 11 young skaters, their parents, and 4 prominent Russian-American coaches, all returning from an event in Kansas. Six of the victims were associated with Skating Club of Boston.	

== Casualties from non-aviation accidents ==
Date (incident)	Team	Sport	Setting	Location	Total Fatalities	Description	Ref.
31 October 1903	Purdue University	American football	Train	Indiana, United States	17	14 members of team killed in head-on collision with another train.	
22 January 1927	Baylor University	Basketball	Bus	Texas, United States	10	10 members of team killed in bus-train collision.	
3 October 1936	L'Aquila Calcio	Association football	Train	Contigliano, Lazio, Italy	15 minimum	Coach died and most playing careers ended, from a head-on crash on the Terni–Sulmona railway. Team was relegated and never recovered the second-tier Serie B league.	
8 July 1951	Thor Akureyri	Association football; Athletics	Bus	Óshlíð, Iceland	2	2 members of club killed, from the football team and the athletics team, when a boulder fell on their bus	
24 November 1974	Sherbrooke Castors	Ice hockey	Bus	Quebec, Canada	1	1 member of team killed, 29 injured	
30 December 1986	Swift Current Broncos	Ice hockey	Bus	Saskatchewan, Canada	4	4 members of team killed	
10 May 1987	Querétaro FC	Association football	Bus	San Luis Potosí, Mexico	3	3 members of team killed	
20 January 1989	Samsunspor	Association football	Bus	Samsun, Turkey	5	3 players, coach and driver killed; 2 players received career-ending injuries.	
21 May 1992	California Angels	Baseball	Bus	New Jersey, United States	0	Manager Buck Rodgers, 3 coaches, 4 players, and 4 others were injured when their bus ran off the New Jersey Turnpike near Woodbury.	
14 July 1997	Australian national team	Bowling; Contract bridge	Footbridge	Tel Aviv, Israel	4	4 players killed, 60+ injured, after a footbridge collapsed into a polluted river during the opening ceremony for the Maccabiah Games.	
5 November 1997	Courmaosta	Ice hockey	Car	Aosta Valley, Italy	1	1 player killed, 2 injured	
2 March 2007	Bluffton University	Baseball	Bus	Atlanta, Georgia, United States	7	5 members of team killed, and 2 bus drivers, when their bus mistakenly drove onto a highway's poorly labeled exit ramp.	
12 January 2008	Bathurst High School	Basketball	Van	New Brunswick, Canada	8	7 members of team killed, and 1 teacher, when their van slid into an oncoming truck on an icy road.	
15 January 2009	Brasil de Pelotas	Association football	Bus	Canguçu, Brazil	3	2 players and one member of staff killed	
18 July 2009	Dynamo Khmelnytskyi	Association football	Bus	Letychiv, Ukraine	1	1 player killed, 2 seriously injured, when their bus was hit by a truck.	
18 February 2014	Mes Kerman	Association football	Bus	Kerman-Tehran Road, Yazd province, Iran	15	15 members of team killed, 19 injured, when their drowsy bus driver veered into a deep ravine.	
23 January 2016	Giant-Alpecin cycling team	Cycle racing	Road collision	Calpe, Spain	0	6 German cyclists received multiple fractures, struck head-on by the car of a British tourist on the wrong side of the road.	
6 April 2018	Humboldt Broncos	Ice hockey	Bus	Saskatchewan, Canada	16	10 players, 2 coaches, statistician, radio announcer, athletic trainer, and bus driver killed, when a truck sped through a stop sign; 13 injured including 2 paralyzed players.	
8 February 2019	Flamengo Youth Academy	Association football	Dormitory	Rio de Janeiro, Brazil	10	10 teenage footballers killed, 3 hospitalized, from a dormitory fire.	
13 March 2021	Shahrdari Noshahr FC	Association football	Bus	Chalus Road, Iran	1	1 member of team killed, 18 hospitalized, when an avalanche overturned their bus	
12 August 2023	Hoang Anh Gia Lai FC	Association football	Car	Chư Pưh district, Gia Lai, Vietnam	3	Collision with two trucks killed the car's 3 passengers: a player, an assistant coach, and the team doctor.	
24 December 2023	Bam Khatoon F.C.	Association football	Car	Kerman-Bam Road, Kerman province, Iran	1	A car taking three players for the Bam Khatoon women's football team, also all players for the Iran women's national football team, to a training ground was involved in a rollover accident which killed one player. Two teammates and the male driver were hospitalized.	
21 September 2024	Coritiba Crocodiles	American football	Bus	Rio de Janeiro vicinity, Brazil	3	3 players were killed and at least 6 hospitalized; bus flipped en route to their national championship game.	
8 June 2026	Ateneo de Manila University	Basketball	Beach	Dipaculao, Aurora, Philippines	2	Two basketball players drowned during a team-building trip.	

== See also ==
- Category:Deaths in sport
