= Flight 621 =

Flight 621 may refer to:

- LAN Chile Flight 621, crashed on 3 April 1961
- Air Canada Flight 621, crashed on 5 July 1970
