= KSWO =

KSWO may refer to:

- KSWO-TV, a TV station licensed to Lawton, Oklahoma, United States
- Stillwater Regional Airport, in Oklahoma, United States, ICAO airport code KSWO
