= Disaster recovery =

Disaster recovery may refer to:

- Recovery stage of emergency management
- IT disaster recovery, maintaining or reestablishing vital information technology infrastructure
- Disaster draft, disaster recovery plan for professional sports teams

== See also ==
- Business continuity and disaster recovery auditing, validating efficacy of recovery plans
