= Draft (sports) =

Process used to allocate certain players to sports teams

In sports, a draft is a process used in some countries and sports to allocate certain players to teams. In a draft, teams take turns selecting from a pool of eligible players. When a team selects a player, the team receives exclusive rights to sign that player to a contract, and no other team in the league may sign the player. The process is similar to round-robin item allocation.

The best-known type of draft is the entry draft, which is used to allocate players who have recently become eligible to play in a league. Depending on the sport, the players may come from college, high school or junior teams, or teams in other countries. An entry draft is intended to prevent expensive bidding wars for young talent and to ensure that no team can sign contracts with all of the best young players and make the league uncompetitive. To encourage parity, teams that do poorly in the previous season usually get to choose first in the postseason draft, sometimes with a "lottery" factor in an attempt to discourage teams from tanking.

Other types of drafts include the expansion draft, in which a new team selects players from other teams in the league, and the dispersal draft, in which a league's surviving teams select players from the roster of a newly defunct franchise. Major professional sports leagues also have special contingency plans for rebuilding a team via a disaster draft, should an accident or other disaster kill or disable many players.

Drafts are usually permitted under antitrust or restraint of trade laws because they are included in collective bargaining agreements between leagues and labor unions representing players. These agreements generally stipulate that after a certain number of seasons, a player whose contract has expired becomes a free agent and can sign with any team. They also require minimum and sometimes maximum salaries for newly drafted players. Leagues may also allow teams to trade draft picks among each other in exchange for other draft picks or in exchange for players.

In 1935, National Football League president Joseph Carr instituted the NFL draft as a way to restrain teams' payrolls and reduce the dominance of the league's perennial contenders. It was adopted by the precursor of the National Basketball Association in 1947; by the National Hockey League in 1963; and by Major League Baseball in 1965, although draft systems had been used in baseball since the 19th century.

Major Indoor Lacrosse League (National Lacrosse League) adopted a collegiate draft in 1988, Major League Soccer in 2000, Major League Lacrosse in 2001, and Major League Rugby in 2020.

Sports drafts are uncommon outside the U.S. and Canada. Most professional football clubs and those in other sports obtain young players through transfers from smaller clubs or by developing youth players through their own academies. The youth system is operated directly by the teams themselves, who develop their players from childhood. Parity in these leagues is instead maintained through promotion and relegation, which automatically expels the weakest teams from a league in exchange for the strongest teams in the next lower league.

== Australia ==
=== AFL draft ===
In Australian rules football's premier competition, the Australian Football League (AFL), a draft was introduced in 1986 when the competition was then known as the Victorian Football League (VFL). This was in response to the increasing transfer fees and player salaries at the time, which in combination with declining attendances, threatened to derail the league. It was also a result of the failure of country zoning, introduced in the late 1960s, which had led to a systematic inequality whereby the clubs with the best zones, like Carlton and Hawthorn, could dominate over clubs with poorer zones like Melbourne.

In the AFL draft, clubs receive picks based on the position in which they finish on the ladder. Therefore, the teams that finish at the bottom of the AFL ladder will get the first draft picks. Also, any team that finishes in a low ladder position for consecutive seasons will receive priority picks.

The AFL's national draft is held in November, with a pre-season draft and a rookie draft held in December.

=== NRL draft ===
The 1991 NSWRL season featured the introduction of rugby league football's first draft system. The draft allowed teams to recruit players on a roster system based on where the club finished the previous year. It ran in reverse order with the wooden spooners getting first choice and the premiers last. The draft lasted just the one season before being defeated in the courts by players and coaches opposed to its limitations.

== Africa ==
=== SA20 Auction ===
Like the IPL the SA20 also has an auction where teams bid on players and subject a salary cap and restrictions on roster size. After the main auction takes place there is then a rookie draft where each team has two minutes to pick one rookie player that is 18–22 years of age. The team that finished last place in the last season is the first to pick and the team that finished first in the last season is the last to pick.

== Europe ==
=== KHL draft ===
When the Russian Superleague became the Kontinental Hockey League, the collective bargaining agreement between the KHL and its players introduced a draft, starting from the very first season of the league. It also allowed teams to use a first-round draft pick to select protected players from a team's farm system. The KHL Junior Draft was discontinued in 2016.

=== The Hundred ===
A draft system is used for The Hundred, a professional franchise 100-ball cricket tournament in England and Wales run by the England and Wales Cricket Board (ECB), which started in 2021. The inaugural Hundred draft took place in October 2019.

== North America ==
=== CFL draft ===
The Canadian Football League (CFL) holds its annual player drafts before the start of the season, either in the last days of April or the start of May. The league's drafts consists of two that occur on the same day: a larger main draft for Canadian players preceded by a smaller draft for "global" players.

The main draft was formerly held as part of the annual league meetings in Hamilton, but is now typically held by conference call with the first two rounds being broadcast live on TSN. Since 2016, the main draft has consisted of eight rounds, with teams drafting in inverse order of their records in the previous season, with the Grey Cup runner-up selecting second-to-last and the Grey Cup champion selecting last. As with the NFL Draft, trading of picks is very common, meaning that a team will not necessarily have eight picks in a given draft. The draft main is restricted to Canadian citizens, plus non-citizens who were raised in Canada since childhood (see the relevant section of the main CFL article). Eligible players can be drafted both from U Sports football programs in Canada and U.S. college football programs.

Since 2019, players who are neither American nor Canadian, designated as "global players", are eligible for and subject to a smaller separate draft that occurs earlier in the morning before the main draft for Canadian players. This draft is structured like the main draft, but is not broadcast on television.

American players, which can compose up to half of a CFL team's roster, are not subject to a draft and enter the league by way of the negotiation list, a process that allows a CFL team to unilaterally stake claim to any international player on a first-come, first-served basis without the player's consent and bar them from negotiating with any other CFL team; this includes almost all of the league's quarterbacks.

=== Global T20 Canada ===
In the inaugural 2018 Global T20 Canada a player draft was held for franchises to choose the players from the available pool.

=== NFL draft ===
Draft order in the NFL is determined in a reverse-record order (the previous season's worst team picking first, the Super Bowl winner picking last). There are 7 rounds of the draft (a maximum of 224 picks), so each team can have 7 selections, plus whatever compensatory selections a team receives as a result of free agency (up to 32 compensatory selections are given each year), and any picks awarded for developing minority candidates for NFL head coaching or general manager positions (starting with the 2021 draft in accordance with NFL Resolution JC-2A). Teams are allowed to trade draft picks (including compensation picks since 2017) among each other in exchange for other draft picks or in exchange for players.

Because the NFL requires that players be three years removed from high school, and of the lack of an effective junior development system outside the college and university programs, players are chosen almost exclusively from National Collegiate Athletic Association college football programs.

The NFL draft has become one of the key events on the American football calendar, airing live on television each April. In recent years it had been held at New York's Radio City Music Hall, but in 2015 and 2016 it was held at Chicago's Auditorium Theatre, and in 2017 it was held on the Rocky Steps at the Philadelphia Museum of Art. The 2018 draft was the first ever to be held at an NFL stadium, namely the Dallas Cowboys' AT&T Stadium.

=== NBA draft ===
The NBA draft, held historically in an NBA city, but in recent drafts in either a theater in the New York area or at the Barclays Center each summer, is only two rounds long (60 picks). Instead of automatically granting the top pick to the worst team from the year before, the NBA holds a draft lottery to determine who chooses first. The top four picks are allocated by chance among the 14 teams that did not make the playoffs the year before. This discourages a team from losing on purpose to get a better draft pick, but also causes other controversies such as allegations and conspiracy theories suggesting that the draft lottery is rigged.

NBA teams choose players from the NCAA and from teams overseas. It was formerly common for players to be chosen directly from high school, but in 2006, the NBA required that players wait a year after high school before playing in the NBA. Almost all top U.S. players thus play at least one year in college.

=== NHL entry draft ===
The NHL operates a seven-round off-season draft (224 picks). Like the NBA, the NHL uses a lottery system to determine which team gets the top pick. All 16 teams, up from 15 between 2017 and 2021, that failed to qualify for the playoffs take part in the weighted lottery with the winner moving up to select first overall. Any North American player aged 18–20, and any overseas player aged 18–21 is eligible to be selected. Players are generally chosen from junior hockey teams, high schools, the NCAA and overseas clubs.

The NHL rotates the draft's location among cities with teams in the league. Like baseball, players drafted in the entry draft usually have to wait a few years in development, either in junior hockey or the minor leagues, before cracking an NHL roster; usually, only one or two draft picks, generally, those that are widely predicted to be blue-chip superstars, jump directly from the draft to the NHL (e.g. Sidney Crosby or Jaromír Jágr).

The league has incrementally expanded the draft lottery process over the course of the early 2010s to discourage "tanking"—the act of deliberately losing to get a better draft pick. Historically, the league only subjected the first overall pick to the draft lottery among the five worst teams in the league, meaning that if a draft had more than one marquee prospect (a generally rare occurrence), it would still be a viable strategy to tank, as a second overall pick was still guaranteed. This was made evident in the 2015 NHL entry draft, where marquee prospects Connor McDavid and Jack Eichel were both seen as NHL-ready and likely to be stars; much speculation surrounded the struggling Buffalo Sabres, who allegedly tanked to secure the rights to at least the second overall pick (a charge that, although the Sabres' fans openly encouraged it, the team officially denied). From the 2016 to 2020 drafts, the top three overall picks were subject to lottery among all fourteen teams that did not make the playoffs, meaning the last-place team will only be assured of the fourth overall pick, at which point virtually any marquee prospect will have already been selected. Since the 2021 draft, only two draws are held for the first two selections. Starting with the 2022 lottery, the team winning one of the two lotteries is only allowed to move up a maximum of ten spots in the draft order and teams will only be allowed to win the lottery twice in a five-year period.

The three major junior leagues that make up the Canadian Hockey League also hold drafts of teenage players in their territories.

=== MLB draft ===
Major League Baseball holds two drafts each year. In June, the first-year player draft, MLB's entry draft, takes place. Only players from Canada, the U.S. or a U.S. territory may be drafted; players from elsewhere are free agents and can be signed by any team. Draftees are high-school graduates who have opted not to go to college, college baseball players at four-year institutions who have played three years or turned 21, or junior college baseball players. As of 2021, the draft lasts 20 rounds (down from 40 in 2019 with the exception of a 5-round 2020 draft), but earlier drafts have lasted up to 100 rounds. The MLB draft generally receives less attention than the drafts in other American sports, since drafted players usually spend several years in the minor leagues before they crack the Major League team's roster. Also, unlike the MLS, NFL, NBA and the NHL Drafts, the MLB draft takes place during the season instead of in the offseason.

In December, MLB holds the much shorter Rule 5 draft. If an organization keeps a player in the minor leagues for a certain number of years, other teams can draft him in the Rule 5 draft. The drafting team must keep the player on its major league roster; it cannot put the player in its own minor leagues system.

=== MLL draft ===
MLL implemented its first collegiate draft in 2001. The draft was held every year until MLL merged with the Premier Lacrosse League in December 2020, with the merged league operating under the PLL banner.

=== MLS Draft ===
Major League Soccer has two types of draft that occur each year, plus a third that is held intermittently when the league adds one or more teams. The two annual drafts are the three-round long MLS SuperDraft (a maximum of 81 picks since 2021, down from four rounds and 104 picks in 2020), which was held for the first time in 2001, and MLS Supplemental Draft, with the MLS Expansion Draft held in the offseason immediately before the league expands.

The MLS SuperDraft happens every January. During the draft the teams from the league will pick up to three players each from colleges across the United States. Only players from the American college sports system (e.g., the NCAA and the NAIA) are eligible to be drafted. Canadian U Sports men's soccer players are not included.

The draft is divided into three rounds in which each club has one selection.

In addition to drafted players, MLS teams also acquire new players from their youth academies. These players are called homegrown players. Homegrown players are academy players who are given a first-team contract. They are required to have spent at least one year in a club's academy, and to have lived in the club's territory (for example, in the case of Orlando City, northern Florida).

The draft gives to the teams opportunity to acquire players from other regions of the country, from outside their territory.

The teams can also acquire new players by signing players from other leagues (usually foreigner leagues), generally young promising players from Latin America and veterans from Europe. MLS has two transfer windows—the primary pre-season transfer window lasts three months from mid February until mid May, and the secondary mid season transfer window runs one month from early July to early August.

=== MLR draft ===
Major League Rugby implemented its first collegiate draft in 2020. Players are eligible for draft after 3 years in college at 21 years old. Free agents can try to join teams at 18 years old.

=== MLW draft ===
Major League Wrestling held its first draft in 2021.

=== NLL draft ===
NLL held its first collegiate draft in 1988 as Major Indoor Lacrosse League.

=== NWSL drafts ===
The National Women's Soccer League used drafts from its inaugural 2013 season until the 2024 season. The first was a draft of college players, followed by a supplemental draft. The final draft of 2013 was a preseason waiver draft in which teams could select players who had been waived by their first squads, but only one player was selected at that time.

The league held a college draft, referred to after 2021 simply as the NWSL Draft after the inclusion of non-collegiate selections, prior to each league season. The waiver draft, now called the "re-entry wire", has also become a permanent part of the league. The league also created other draft mechanisms to address other types of eligibility, such as the unsubsidized individual distribution ranking order introduced for college draft-ineligible NWSL federation players in 2016, and the under-18 entry list for domestic minors introduced in 2023. With league expansion and contraction since its establishment, the league has also irregularly held both expansion drafts to help stock the rosters of new teams, and a dispersal draft in which teams could select players from a defunct team.

On August 22, 2024, the NWSL announced the elimination of its draft and discovery systems as part of its renegotiated collective bargaining agreement with the National Women's Soccer League Players Association. NWSL teams could pursue and sign any prospective collegiate and international players as free agents, transfers between NWSL teams would require player consent, and all contracts would become guaranteed, bringing the league closer in line with global standards within the sport.

=== PLL draft ===
The Premier Lacrosse League held its first collegiate draft in 2019, shortly before the start of its inaugural season.

=== UFL draft ===
The United Football League held its first rookie draft in 2024, and its two predecessor leagues (the USFL and XFL) held rookie drafts in 2023. Players eligible for the UFL draft are those who were eligible for that year's NFL draft but went unselected.

=== WNBA draft ===
The WNBA draft is held every spring. It has had several locations during its history; the most recent draft in 2022 took place in New York City, following two drafts held virtually due to COVID-19 concerns. The draft is currently three rounds long with each of the 12 teams in the league (trades aside) making three picks each. Draft order for teams that made the playoffs the previous year are based on team records. The team with the highest previous record will pick last. Since eight teams qualify for playoffs, the bottom eight picks are determined by this method. For the remaining top four picks, a selection process similar to the NBA Draft Lottery is conducted for the four teams that did not qualify for the playoffs.

=== WWE Draft ===
The WWE Draft is used to refresh WWE's Raw and SmackDown rosters, as well as shuffle talent between the two.

== South Asia ==
=== IPL auction ===
Cricket's Indian Premier League instead holds a yearly auction before the start of each season in which teams bid on players, subject to a salary cap and restrictions on roster size.

=== ISL draft ===
Indian Super League is responsible for holding drafts prior to the commencement of each season. Teams can buy foreign players with international experience while they still can purchase Indian players with little or no experience.

=== PSL draft ===
The Pakistan Super League uses a draft system for player recruitment before the start of every season to fairly distribute the league's new players. Teams are allotted slots in every round of the draft and slots can be exchanged with other teams.

== Southeast Asia ==
=== PBA draft ===
The Philippine Basketball Association (PBA) draft is an annual event in the PBA calendar in which teams can acquire new players outside the league which are not free agents. Only natural-born Filipinos and foreign nationals with Filipino ancestry, whether or not they acquired Philippine citizenship, are eligible to be drafted. The draft began in 1985; prior to that teams directly hired rookies.

Until 2014, there was a draft lottery between the two worst team of the preceding season. This was scrapped after the events of the 2014 draft lottery.

The PBA Developmental League also has their own draft.

== Other terminology ==
=== Draft bust ===
A draft bust is a highly touted or highly selected draftee who does not meet expectations. This can be for a variety of reasons such as being unable to adjust to the professional level or if their career was derailed by injuries or personal issues. A player is also regarded as a bust if more successful players are drafted after them.

==== NFL ====
First-, second-, and third-round picks are considered high draft picks drafted to be long-term starters for the team that selected them. NFL players who are drafted in this range and fail to develop into starters for their original team are thus considered busts. This label particularly applies for 1st-round picks, who are considered to be premium talents. One of the most frequently cited examples of a draft bust in the NFL is Ryan Leaf, who was selected second overall in the 1998 NFL draft by the San Diego Chargers, after the Indianapolis Colts had selected future Hall of Famer Peyton Manning. The Chargers had chosen Leaf over future Hall of Famers Charles Woodson, Randy Moss, and Alan Faneca, as well as six future Pro Bowlers.

Despite being described as being equal in talent to Manning prior to the draft, Leaf only managed to play two seasons with the Chargers and start 18 games (winning only four) for them before being released in 2000. Leaf played only three further games for the Dallas Cowboys, and was out of the league by 2002.

Tony Mandarich and JaMarcus Russell, two other frequently cited draft busts, are examples of players whose status as busts are amplified by their placements in the draft:

- Mandarich is the only top-five pick from the 1989 NFL draft who is not in the Hall of Fame, having been selected second overall by the Green Bay Packers after the Dallas Cowboys selected Troy Aikman, with the subsequent three picks being Barry Sanders, Derrick Thomas, and Deion Sanders. The Packers also passed on Hall of Famer Steve Atwater as well as six future Pro Bowlers to select Mandarich.
- Russell was selected first overall in the 2007 NFL draft by the Oakland Raiders, with the next two picks being Hall of Famers Calvin Johnson and Joe Thomas. The Raiders also passed on Hall of Famers Darrelle Revis and Patrick Willis as well as Pro Bowlers Adrian Peterson, Marshawn Lynch, Eric Weddle, Ryan Kalil, Greg Olsen, Joe Staley, and Marshal Yanda to select Russell.

Like Leaf, Russell was released by the Raiders after three seasons and was out of the league by 2010. Mandarich later managed to become a serviceable offensive lineman for the Indianapolis Colts after being released by the Packers in 1992, but ultimately never lived up to his draft position.

Other frequently cited examples include:

- Tim Tebow (QB) – Tebow was selected 25th overall by the Denver Broncos in the 2010 NFL draft, despite concerns over his throwing mechanics and accuracy. He became a starter in 2011, leading the Broncos to the playoffs, but struggled as a passer and was replaced after the team acquired Peyton Manning. Tebow spent just three seasons with the Broncos and was out of the NFL after the 2012 season, later making unsuccessful attempts to return as a quarterback and tight end.
- Art Schlichter (QB) – Schlichter was selected 4th overall by the Baltimore Colts in the 1982 NFL draft, selecting him over Hall of Famers Marcus Allen, Mike Munchak, Andre Tippett, and Morten Andersen as well as Pro Bowlers Jim McMahon, Gerald Riggs, and Mike Quick. Schlichter's gambling addiction ultimately derailed his career and was out in the NFL after just 3 seasons.
- Todd Blackledge (QB) – Blackledge was selected 7th overall by the Kansas City Chiefs in the 1983 NFL draft, selecting him over Hall of Famers Bruce Matthews, Jim Kelly, Dan Marino, Darrell Green, Roger Craig, and Richard Dent as well as Pro Bowler Joey Browner. Blackledge spent most of his career as a backup QB and was out of the NFL by 1990.
- Ki-Jana Carter (RB) – The Cincinnati Bengals traded two draft picks to the newly expanded Carolina Panthers to get the first overall pick to draft Carter in the 1995 NFL draft. The Bengals selected him over Hall of Famers, including Tony Boselli, Warren Sapp, Ty Law, Derrick Brooks, Curtis Martin, and Terrell Davis, as well as All-Pros Steve McNair, Ruben Brown, Hugh Douglas, and Todd Sauerbrun. Carter only spent 5 seasons with the Bengals before he was released, and would eventually leave the NFL by 2004. His career was mostly plagued by injuries and ultimately never lived to his high draft position.
- Andre Wadsworth (DE) – Wadsworth was selected third overall by the Arizona Cardinals in the 1998 NFL draft, the Cardinals selected him over Hall of Famers Charles Woodson, Randy Moss, and Alan Faneca, as well as All-Pros Keith Brooking, Flozell Adams, Patrick Surtain, and Olin Kreutz. Wadsworth only played three seasons with the Cardinals before the team released him after going through career ending surgery although in 2007 Wadsworth tried to return to the NFL to no avail.
- Akili Smith (QB) – The New Orleans Saints had offered the Cincinnati Bengals nine future draft picks in exchange for their No. 3 first-round pick in the 1999 NFL draft. The Bengals declined the offer and selected Smith. Hall of Famers Edgerrin James and Champ Bailey were taken soon after by other teams in this draft, as well as All-Pros Torry Holt and Jevon Kearse.
- Lawrence Phillips (RB) – The St. Louis Rams traded Hall of Famer Jerome Bettis to the Pittsburgh Steelers believing that Phillips could better fill the position. While Phillips was regarded as a highly-talented player, his off-field issues derailed his career.
- Todd Marinovich (QB) – Remembered for both his unorthodox upbringing and being selected ahead of Hall of Famer Brett Favre.
- Tim Couch (QB) – Selected first overall by the expansion Cleveland Browns in the 1999 NFL draft over future six-time Pro Bowler Donovan McNabb, who was selected second overall by the Philadelphia Eagles, also Hall of Famers Edgerrin James, Champ Bailey, as well as All-Pros Torry Holt, Chris McAlister, Daunte Culpepper, Jevon Kearse, Al Wilson, and Joey Porter. Couch only played 4 seasons with the Browns before being released. Couch would leave the NFL by 2007.
- Courtney Brown (DE) – The Cleveland Browns with the first overall pick for the second consecutive year the Browns picked Courtney Brown at the 2000 NFL draft who turned out to be a bust like Tim Couch. The Browns selected him over Hall of Famer Brian Urlacher and All-Pros Chris Samuels, John Abraham, Julian Peterson, Shaun Alexander, as well as Pro Bowlers LaVar Arrington, Jamal Lewis, Thomas Jones, Bubba Franks, and Keith Bulluck and as well with a future hall of famer Tom Brady. Courtney Brown only spent 5 seasons with the Browns before the Browns released him; he would leave the NFL after 6 seasons.
- Charles Rogers (WR) – The Detroit Lions selected Charles Rogers second overall in the 2003 NFL draft over Hall of Famers Andre Johnson and Troy Polamalu, as well as All-Pros Kevin Williams, Terrell Suggs, Nnamdi Asomugha, Lance Briggs, Jason Witten, and Pro Bowlers Anquan Boldin, Jordan Gross. Roger would only play 15 games due to injury and was out of the league after three seasons.
- Robert Gallery (OT) – The Oakland Raiders selected Robert Gallery at second overall in the 2004 NFL draft over first-ballot Hall of Famer Larry Fitzgerald and All-Pros Philip Rivers, Ben Roethlisberger, Vince Wilfork, Steven Jackson, Chris Snee, as well as Pro Bowlers DeAngelo Hall, Jonathan Vilma, Tommie Harris, Bob Sanders, and Darnell Dockett. Gallery was considered pre-draft to be one of the best offensive tackle prospects but he struggled at tackle before moving to guard after three seasons, where he became serviceable. Gallery would eventually leave the NFL by 2012.
- Trent Richardson (RB) – The Cleveland Browns traded four draft picks to the Minnesota Vikings for their third overall pick in the 2012 NFL draft, picking Richardson over Hall of Famer Luke Kuechly and Pro Bowlers Stephon Gilmore, Fletcher Cox, Chandler Jones, David DeCastro, Harrison Smith, and Bobby Wagner. Richardson spent less than two seasons with the Browns before being traded to the Indianapolis Colts. He never lived up to his draft position and left the NFL after five seasons.
- Justin Gilbert (CB) – The Cleveland Browns traded up to the 8th overall pick in 2014 NFL draft to select Gilbert, passing on Anthony Barr, Odell Beckham Jr., Aaron Donald, Zack Martin, C. J. Mosley, Derek Carr, DeMarcus Lawrence, Davante Adams, and Jarvis Landry. Gilbert would only play 23 games with 3 starts over two seasons, recording 39 tackles and one interception, before being traded to the Pittsburgh Steelers. He was released a year later and left the league after being suspended for violating the NFL's drug policy.
- Mitchell Trubisky (QB) – The Chicago Bears swapped their third overall pick and three draft picks with the San Francisco 49ers in exchange for their second overall pick in the 2017 NFL draft to draft Trubisky. Widely regarded as one of the top quarterbacks in the pre-draft, and was selected over future All-Pros Christian McCaffrey, Patrick Mahomes, T.J. Watt, Budda Baker, George Kittle, as well as Pro Bowlers Jamal Adams, Marshon Lattimore, Deshaun Watson, Dalvin Cook, Alvin Kamara, Cooper Kupp, and Trey Hendrickson. Despite being named in the Pro Bowl in 2018 Trubisky would only last four seasons with the Bears before leaving for free agency to join the Buffalo Bills in 2021. Trubisky was largely a bust because of his inconsistent play and his failure to live up to expectations of a second overall pick quarterback.
- Josh Rosen (QB) – The Arizona Cardinals traded three draft picks to the Oakland Raiders for the 10th overall pick in the 2018 NFL draft to draft Rosen. Widely heralded as the most "pro ready" quarterback in the draft, he was selected over Pro Bowlers Minkah Fitzpatrick, Derwin James, Jaire Alexander, Frank Ragnow, Lamar Jackson, Nick Chubb, Shaquille Leonard, Fred Warner, Orlando Brown Jr., Mark Andrews, and Wyatt Teller. Rosen would only play one season with the Cardinals before being traded to the Miami Dolphins after the Cardinals' league-worst record got them the first overall pick in the 2019 NFL draft, which they used to draft Kyler Murray. Likewise, he only lasted one season with the Dolphins as he struggled in limited action and was waived after the Dolphins drafted Tua Tagovailoa in the 2020 NFL draft. Rosen spent time on five more teams in the next three seasons before retiring from the NFL altogether.
- Zach Wilson (QB) – The New York Jets drafted Wilson with the number two overall pick. He went 3-10 his rookie year, while throwing more interceptions than touchdowns. In his second season, he was benched twice and demoted to third string by the end of the season. In his third year, the Jets traded for Aaron Rodgers, but an early injury to Rodgers thrust Wilson back in the lineup. However, he was subsequently benched again midseason and traded to the Denver Broncos after the season where he served as the team's third-string quarterback. He is considered among the biggest busts in NFL history.
- Trey Lance (QB) – The San Francisco 49ers traded three first round picks and a second round pick to the Miami Dolphins in exchange for their third overall pick in the 2021 NFL draft to draft Lance. Lance would only play in eight games over two seasons for the 49ers before being traded to the Dallas Cowboys after the emergence of Brock Purdy, the Mr. Irrelevant of the 2022 NFL draft, as the team's starter.
- Anthony Richardson (QB) – Richardson was drafted by the Indianapolis Colts with the fourth overall pick in the 2023 NFL draft, over future Pro Bowlers Devon Witherspoon, Bijan Robinson, Jalen Carter, Jahmyr Gibbs, Christian Gonzalez, Jaxon Smith-Njigba, Zay Flowers, and Puka Nacua. He only played four games in his rookie season before missing the rest of the season with an AC joint injury. In his next season, he missed the first six weeks due to injuries. In his first game of the season, he took himself out of the game for a play that prompted him to be benched for two games. He finished the season with a 6-5 record, but threw 12 interceptions over 8 touchdowns and only completed 47.7% of his passes. The Colts later signed Daniel Jones who beat Richardson as the starter. After Jones suffered an Achilles injury, Richardson was already hurt with an orbital fracture, meaning the Colts would have to look elsewhere for a starting quarterback. After the 2025 season, the Colts let Richardson seek a trade.

==== NBA ====
In the NBA, one of the most well-known example of a draft bust is LaRue Martin, who was selected first overall in the 1972 NBA draft by the Portland Trail Blazers: the Trail Blazers passed on Hall of Famers Bob McAdoo, Paul Westphal, and Julius Erving to select Martin. Despite being seen as an excellent prospect, Martin had a career average of only 5.3 points per game, and was out of the NBA by 1977.

Another well-known example is Sam Bowie: while proving to be a serviceable though injury-prone player, Bowie was haunted by being drafted second overall by the Trail Blazers in the famously talent-rich 1984 NBA draft. Hall of Famer Hakeem Olajuwon was the first pick, while the Trail Blazers passed on Hall of Famers Michael Jordan, Charles Barkley, and John Stockton to select Bowie.

Other notable examples include:

- Jon Koncak, in 1985, who was selected by the Atlanta Hawks fifth overall, ahead of Hall of Famers Chris Mullin, Karl Malone, and Joe Dumars; as well as other notable players Detlef Schrempf, Charles Oakley, A.C. Green, and Terry Porter. Although Koncak played in the NBA for over a decade, he never lived up to expectations of being a fifth overall pick and is infamous for his six year contract known as the “Jon Contract” in 1989 which made him one of the highest paid players at the time despite him being a bench player.
- Todd Fuller, in 1996, who was selected by the Golden State Warriors eleventh overall in a highly talented 1996 draft, ahead of Hall of Famers Kobe Bryant and Steve Nash as well as other notable players Peja Stojaković, Jermaine O'Neal, and Žydrūnas Ilgauskas. What makes Fuller's case worse is that the draft included Hall of Famer Ben Wallace, who went undrafted yet had a better career.
- Michael Olowokandi, in 1998, who was selected by the Los Angeles Clippers first overall, ahead of Hall of Famers Vince Carter, Dirk Nowitzki, and Paul Pierce. Olowokandi is well-known for his unorthodox path to being drafted in the NBA.
- Frédéric Weis, in 1999, who was selected by the New York Knicks in the first round, ahead of Hall of Famer Manu Ginóbili, as well as other notable players Ron Artest and Andrei Kirilenko, but never played in the NBA.
- Kwame Brown, in 2001, who was selected by the Washington Wizards first overall, ahead of Hall of Famers Pau Gasol and Tony Parker as well as other notable players Tyson Chandler, Joe Johnson, Zach Randolph, and Gilbert Arenas.
- Nikoloz Tskitishvili, in 2002, who was selected by the Denver Nuggets fifth overall, ahead of Hall of Famer Amar'e Stoudemire as well as notable players Caron Butler, Tayshaun Prince, and Carlos Boozer.
- Darko Miličić, in 2003, who was selected by the Detroit Pistons second overall, ahead of Hall of Famers Carmelo Anthony, Chris Bosh, Dwyane Wade as well as other notable players David West, Mo Williams and Kyle Korver.
- In the 2006 draft Andrea Bargnani, who was selected by the Toronto Raptors first overall and Adam Morrison, who was selected by the Charlotte Bobcats third overall, ahead of LaMarcus Aldridge, Brandon Roy, Rajon Rondo, Kyle Lowry, and Paul Millsap.
- Greg Oden, in 2007, who was selected by the Portland Trail Blazers first overall, ahead of Kevin Durant, Al Horford, Joakim Noah, and Marc Gasol.
- Hasheem Thabeet, in 2009, who was selected by the Memphis Grizzlies second overall, ahead of James Harden, Stephen Curry, DeMar DeRozan, Jrue Holiday, and Patrick Beverley.
- Evan Turner, in 2010, who was selected by the Philadelphia 76ers second overall, ahead of DeMarcus Cousins, Gordon Hayward and Paul George.
- Derrick Williams, in 2011, who was selected by the Minnesota Timberwolves second overall, ahead of Kemba Walker, Klay Thompson, Kawhi Leonard, Jimmy Butler and Isaiah Thomas.
- Michael Kidd-Gilchrist, in 2012, who was selected by the Charlotte Bobcats second overall, ahead of Bradley Beal, Damian Lillard, Draymond Green and Khris Middleton.
- Anthony Bennett, in 2013, who was selected by the Cleveland Cavaliers first overall, ahead of Victor Oladipo, Giannis Antetokounmpo and Rudy Gobert.
- Jabari Parker, in 2014, who was selected by the Milwaukee Bucks second overall, ahead of Joel Embiid, Marcus Smart, Julius Randle, Zach LaVine, and Nikola Jokić.
- In the 2017 draft Lonzo Ball, who was selected by the Los Angeles Lakers second overall and Josh Jackson, who was selected by the Phoenix Suns fourth overall, ahead of Jayson Tatum, De'Aaron Fox, Lauri Markkanen, Donovan Mitchell, Bam Adebayo and Jarrett Allen.
- Marvin Bagley III, in 2018, who was selected by the Sacramento Kings second overall, ahead of Luka Dončić, Jaren Jackson Jr., Trae Young, Shai Gilgeous-Alexander, and Jalen Brunson.
- James Wiseman, in 2020, who was selected by the Golden State Warriors second overall, ahead of LaMelo Ball, Tyrese Haliburton and Tyrese Maxey.

==== MLB ====
Notable players widely considered draft busts include Steve Chilcott (1966), Brien Taylor (1991), and Brady Aiken (2014), all of whom were 1st overall draft picks who never reached the majors.

A well-known example is pitcher David Clyde, the first overall pick in the 1973 draft by the Texas Rangers. Despite being only 18 years old at the time of his selection, the Rangers called-up Clyde directly to the majors instead of developing him in the minors. After 2 mediocre seasons with the Rangers, Clyde was sent down to the minors and would not return to the majors until 1978 after he was traded to the Cleveland Indians. After 2 seasons with the Indians, Clyde retired at only 26 years old due to shoulder injuries. Clyde's career made him the "poster-boy" for bringing up young players prematurely. The Rangers passed on future Hall of Famers Robin Yount, Dave Winfield, and Eddie Murray to take Clyde.

Matt Bush (2004), another 1st overall pick, dealt with legal troubles culminating in incarceration and waited nearly 12 years to make the major leagues, eventually doing so as a middle relief pitcher in 2016.

Pitcher Mark Appel, the first overall pick in 2013, stepped away from baseball after 2018 due to repeated struggles on the mound. He returned to the game in 2021, but did not make his major league debut until the 2022 season for the Philadelphia Phillies, appearing in only six games and has not pitched in the majors since.

==== NHL ====
A notable draft bust was Alexandre Daigle (1993 Draft), who is notable for saying "I'm glad I went number one, cause no one remembers number two" upon being drafted by the Ottawa Senators. The number two selection that year happened to be eventual Hockey Hall of Fame inductee Chris Pronger, and the Senators also missed out on Hall of Famer Paul Kariya who went 4th overall.

Other players cited as major draft busts include:

- Greg Joly, who was selected 1st overall in 1974 by the Washington Capitals, spent the majority of his career in the minor leagues.
- Gord Kluzak, who was selected 1st overall in 1982 by the Boston Bruins, had an injury-plagued career playing only one full season throughout his nine years in the NHL.
- Brian Lawton, who was selected 1st overall in 1983 by the Minnesota North Stars, once thought to be the next Great One/Wayne Gretzky, although a serviceable player in his 9 year NHL career, however he failed to live up to expectations of being the first overall pick failing to record more than 44 points in a season in his NHL career, Lawton was selected ahead of Hall of Famers Pat LaFontaine, Steve Yzerman, Tom Barrasso, and Cam Neely all the Hall of Famers listed were drafted in the first round.
- Alek Stojanov, who was selected 7th overall in 1991 by the Vancouver Canucks, was an enforcer with scoring ability who lost scoring touch due to injury before his first NHL game. He also became known for the weaker piece involved in one of the most lopsided trades in NHL history, when the Canucks traded him to the Pittsburgh Penguins in exchange for eventual All-Star forward Markus Näslund.
- Patrik Štefan, who was selected 1st overall in 1999 by the Atlanta Thrashers, had an injury-plagued, seven season career. The Vancouver Canucks, with whom the Thrashers had swapped a pick to choose Štefan, then chose all-star and eventual Hall of Famers Daniel Sedin and his twin brother Henrik at second and third overall respectively.
- Pavel Brendl, who was selected 4th overall in 1999 by the New York Rangers, signed in Europe after playing with three different NHL teams in parts of four seasons.
- Rick DiPietro, who was selected 1st overall in 2000 by the New York Islanders, had eventual career ending injuries which started in his second season of a groundbreaking 15-year contract, and played only 50 games thereafter.
- Petr Taticek, who was selected 9th overall in 2002 by the Florida Panthers, spent the majority of his underperforming North American career in the minors, and only played three NHL games with the Panthers. Afterwards, he spent the remainder of his career between the Kontinental Hockey League and various European leagues.
- Hugh Jessiman, who was selected 12th overall in 2003 by the New York Rangers, played all but two games of his North American career in the minors. Many players selected after Jessiman would go on to have substantial NHL careers, such as Hall of Famer Shea Weber as well as all-stars Dustin Brown, Brent Seabrook, Zach Parise, Ryan Getzlaf, Brent Burns, Ryan Kesler, Mike Richards, Corey Perry, and Patrice Bergeron.
- Nikita Filatov, who was selected 6th overall in 2008 by the Columbus Blue Jackets, spent the majority of his North American career in the minors, playing only 53 NHL games. Filatov was selected ahead of all-stars Josh Bailey, Erik Karlsson, Jordan Eberle, John Carlson, Jacob Markström, and Roman Josi.
- Scott Glennie, who was selected 8th overall in 2009 by the Dallas Stars, only played a single game in the NHL and spent the majority of his career in the minors. Glennie was selected ahead of all-stars Chris Kreider, Kyle Palmieri, and Ryan O’Reilly.
- Nail Yakupov, who was selected 1st overall in 2012 by the Edmonton Oilers, returned to the Kontinental Hockey League after playing with three different NHL teams over six seasons.
- Griffin Reinhart, who was selected 4th overall in 2012 by the New York Islanders and played all but 37 games of his North American career in the minors. The Islanders would trade Reinhart in 2015 to the Edmonton Oilers in what would turn out to be one of the most lopsided trades in NHL history; with the first and second-round picks they receive, the Islanders would end up drafting Mathew Barzal at 16th overall in the first round and Anthony Beauvillier at 28th overall in the first round as the Islanders traded their second round pick for a first round pick. Barzal would end up winning the Calder Memorial Trophy in his rookie year and end up being a three-time all-star. Reinhart, along with Yakupov, was selected ahead of all-stars Morgan Rielly, Hampus Lindholm, Filip Forsberg, and Andrei Vasilevskiy.
- Zachary Senyshyn, who was selected 15th overall in 2015, by the Boston Bruins, spent the majority of his North American career in the minors, while playing only 16 NHL games before leaving North America in 2023. Senyshyn was selected ahead of all-stars Mathew Barzal, Kyle Connor, Thomas Chabot, Brock Boeser, Travis Konecny, and Sebastian Aho.
- Olli Juolevi, who was selected 5th overall in 2016 by the Vancouver Canucks, spent the majority of his injury-plagued North American career in the minors, playing only 41 NHL games before returning to his native Finland to play in the SM-liiga. Juolevi was selected ahead of all-stars Matthew Tkachuk, Clayton Keller, Charlie McAvoy, Tage Thompson, Jordan Kyrou, and Alex DeBrincat.
- Nolan Patrick, who was selected 2nd overall in 2017 by the Philadelphia Flyers, had an injury plagued 6 year NHL career before he left the NHL in 2023. Patrick was selected ahead of all-stars Miro Heiskanen, Cale Makar, Elias Pettersson, Nick Suzuki, Robert Thomas, Jake Oettinger, and Jason Robertson.

==== Australian Football League ====
Examples of draft busts include Scott Gumbleton and Mitch Thorp. Gumbleton and Thorp were selected with the second and sixth picks respectively in the 2006 AFL draft; their clubs, Essendon and Hawthorn, passed on future All-Australian players Travis Boak, Joel Selwood, Ben Reid, James Frawley, Jack Riewoldt, Shane Edwards, Todd Goldstein, Bachar Houli and Robbie Gray to draft them.

Thorp managed only two games in three years with Hawthorn before being delisted, while Gumbleton managed only 35 games in six years with Essendon before being traded to Fremantle, after which he retired without playing another game.

=== Draft steal ===
Conversely, a player who was drafted at a low spot or in later rounds and is expected to have little success yet goes on to have a stellar and productive career is known as a draft steal.

==== MLB ====
Mike Piazza, who went on to become one of the best catchers of the 1990s, a 12-time MLB All-Star selection and a Hall of Famer, was chosen in the 62nd round (1390th overall) of the 1988 MLB draft and was selected only as a favor to Tommy Lasorda (whose team, the Los Angeles Dodgers, drafted Piazza): to further put the pick in historic perspective, the MLB draft is now much shorter, having most recently been reduced from 40 rounds to 20 in 2021.

José Bautista was selected in the 20th round, 599th overall by the Pittsburgh Pirates in 2000. Although his major league career started off slowly in 2004, Bautista, after being traded to the Toronto Blue Jays in 2008, experienced a breakthrough season in 2010. He led the majors in home runs in 2010 and 2011 and would make the American League All-Star Team six consecutive seasons from 2010-2015.

==== NFL ====
One of the most notable examples is Tom Brady, who was drafted late in the sixth round (at 199th overall pick) of the 2000 NFL draft by the then-mediocre New England Patriots only as a fourth-string backup quarterback, but went on to have a two-decade career winning seven Super Bowls (six with the Patriots and one with the Tampa Bay Buccaneers), five Super Bowl MVPs, and three NFL MVPs, setting the all-time records for wins, passing yards, completions, and touchdowns in the process. Similarly, two-time Super Bowl champion Roger Staubach was a tenth-round pick in both the AFL and NFL drafts, largely due to having a four-year commitment to serve in the U.S. Navy.

Pro Football Hall of Fame quarterbacks that were draft steals include Johnny Unitas, who was drafted in the ninth round of the 1955 NFL draft by the Pittsburgh Steelers, who cut him at the end of the team's training camp, while Bart Starr, a two-time Super Bowl MVP and five-time championship winner, was the 200th overall pick in 1956 due to concerns about back injury problems. Joe Montana and Dan Fouts were third-round selections, with Montana slipping due to an average combine performance.

Wide receiver Terrell Owens was selected in the third round (89th overall) by the San Francisco 49ers in 1996. Owens went on to play 17 seasons in the NFL and became a six-time Pro Bowler and a five-time All-Pro and led the NFL in touchdown receptions three times. Owens was inducted into the Hall of Fame in 2018 and is widely considered one of the greatest wide receivers in NFL history.

Also in the 1996 draft, linebacker Zach Thomas, who was considered too "small", "short", and "unathletic" to play the linebacker position at the pro level, was selected in the fifth round with the 154th overall pick by the Miami Dolphins. He would go on to be one of the best and most consistent linebackers of his era, anchoring a Top 10 ranked Miami defense in eight out of his 12 years in Miami, while being selected to seven Pro Bowls, five first team All-Pro selections, and the NFL 2000s All-Decade Team. Thomas was inducted to the Pro Football Hall of Fame in 2023.

The 2017 NFL draft has seen two draft steals emerge. Wide receiver Cooper Kupp, who was selected in the third round (69th overall) by the Los Angeles Rams, has the most receptions, touchdown catches, and receiving yards of any wide receiver or player drafted in 2017 (as of the conclusion of the 2022 NFL season), including the six wide receivers that were drafted ahead of him. Furthermore, in 2021, Kupp won the receiving triple crown, AP Offensive Player of the Year Award, and Super Bowl LVI MVP in what is regarded as one of the greatest seasons by a wide receiver in NFL history. Tight end George Kittle was selected in the fifth round (146th overall) by the San Francisco 49ers. As of the end of the 2024 NFL season, Kittle has been selected to six Pro Bowl teams and five All-Pro teams and was a key piece in the 49ers reaching Super Bowls LIV and LVIII.

Wide receiver Tyreek Hill, was selected in the fifth round (165th overall) of the 2016 NFL draft by the Kansas City Chiefs, has been named to eight Pro Bowls, six with Chiefs two with the Dolphins, was included in the NFL 2010s All-Decade Team, was a 4 time All-Pro receiver from 2018 to 2023 and also an All-Pro first-team punt returner in his rookie year in 2016, led the Chiefs to their first Super Bowl win in 50 years Super Bowl LIV and was the key member to the Chief's dynasty until he was traded in 2022 to the Miami Dolphins.

Antonio Brown was drafted 195th overall by the Pittsburgh Steelers in 2010 but was an All-Pro receiver from 2013 to 2018, before being traded to the Oakland Raiders in 2019 (later getting released by them and the New England Patriots over accusations of sexual assault). Brown would eventually help the Tampa Bay Buccaneers win Super Bowl LV.

Cornerback Richard Sherman was selected in the 5th round, 154th overall by the Seattle Seahawks in the 2011 NFL draft. In his eleven year career, Sherman was selected to five All-Pro and five Pro-Bowl teams. Sherman also helped the Seahawks reach Super Bowls XLVIII and XLIX with the Seahawks winning the former. After signing with the San Francisco 49ers in 2018, Sherman helped them reach Super Bowl LIV.

Also taken in 2011 was center Jason Kelce who was selected in the sixth round, 191st overall by the Philadelphia Eagles. Kelce went on to play thirteen seasons with the Eagles, being selected to seven Pro Bowl teams and six All-Pro teams, and is widely considered one of the greatest centers in NFL history. Kelce also helped the Eagles reach two Super Bowls and won Super Bowl LII. Similarly, Jason's brother Travis was a third-round selection by the Kansas City Chiefs, but went on to become a seven-time All-Pro while setting multiple receiving records for the tight end position and helping the Chiefs win Super Bowls LIV, LVII, and LVIII.

Wide receiver Amon-Ra St. Brown was drafted in the fourth round at 112th overall of the 2021 NFL draft by the Detroit Lions. St. Brown played a key part in the rebuilding of the Lions organization, led by head coach Dan Campbell, that turned them from a struggling team into a Super Bowl contender.

Quarterback Brock Purdy was selected last overall in the 2022 NFL draft by the San Francisco 49ers. Initially a third-string backup, he eventually was moved to starter after injuries to Trey Lance and Jimmy Garoppolo. Purdy has since led the 49ers to an NFC Championship Game in 2022 and an appearance in Super Bowl LVIII in 2023, leading the NFL in passer rating, garnering a Pro Bowl spot, and being an MVP finalist in the latter season.

==== NBA ====
Manu Ginóbili, a key contributor to four San Antonio Spurs championships in the 21st century, was the next-to-last pick (57th) in the 1999 NBA draft. He was also the centerpiece of Argentina's national team in the 2004 Summer Olympics, where he led his country to a gold medal and was named the MVP of the tournament.

Another notable draft steal is Isaiah Thomas, who was selected as the 60th and last pick in the 2011 NBA draft, but emerged as an All-Star in 2017 and led the Boston Celtics to the first seed in the Eastern Conference that same year. He also finished 5th in MVP voting in 2017 with an average of 28.9 points and 5.9 assists.

Draymond Green, who was selected as the 35th pick in the 2012 NBA draft, was a key contributor to the Golden State Warriors winning four championships. Green has been named to multiple All-Star selections and also won the NBA Defensive Player of the Year Award in 2017.

Nikola Jokić, a Serbian who was selected by the Denver Nuggets as the 41st pick in the 2014 NBA draft, remained in Europe for the 2014–15 season to develop his skills before arriving in the NBA in 2015. In his second season, he quickly became a solid post playmaker, averaging about 16.7 ppg, 4.9 apg, and 9.8 rpg. He was also named to the All-NBA Team in both 2019 (first team) and 2020 (second team), and won league MVP in 2021, 2022 and 2024 while leading the Nuggets to their first championship in 2023. He was the first 2nd round pick to win MVP since Willis Reed in 1970; the latter was the 8th pick in the 1964 NBA draft. Jokić was also a crucial member of Serbia's national team in the 2016 and 2024 Summer Olympics, where he won silver and bronze medals respectively. Jokic's selection was notably preempted by a Taco Bell ad during ESPN's coverage of the draft.

DeAndre Jordan, who was selected as the 35th pick in the 2008 NBA draft, was named All-NBA three times in his career, with three straight selections from 2015 to 2017, including a first team appearance in 2016, was selected to back-to-back All-Defense teams in 2014-15 and 2015-16, became an All-Star in 2017 and led the league in rebounding two years in a row (2014, 2015). He became a significant contributor of the "Lob city Clippers" era for the Los Angeles Clippers, along with Blake Griffin and Chris Paul. Jordan would win alongside Jokić and the Denver Nuggets in the 2023 NBA Finals.

Kyle Korver, who was selected as the 51st pick in the 2003 NBA draft, went to have a successful 17-year career in the NBA. He was an All-Star in 2015 and is one of the most prolific 3-point shooters in league history, ranking eighth all-time in 3-point field goals made with 2,450.

Jordan Clarkson, who was selected as the 46th pick in the 2014 NBA draft, won the NBA Sixth Man of the Year Award with the Utah Jazz in 2021, and helped the New York Knicks end their 53-year championship drought in the 2026 NBA Finals.

Malcolm Brogdon, who was the 36th pick in the 2016 NBA draft, won the Rookie of the Year award in 2017 and became a member of the exclusive 50–40–90 club in 2019. He also won the NBA Sixth Man of the Year Award in 2023.

Jalen Brunson, who was selected as the 33rd pick in the 2018 NBA draft, went on to have a breakout year in 2024, making his first All-Star and All-NBA team during the 2023-24 season, and led the Knicks to their first championship since 1973 in the 2026 NBA Finals.

Marc Gasol was selected as the 48th pick by the Los Angeles Lakers in the 2007 NBA draft, but was traded to the Memphis Grizzlies in a package that sent his older brother Pau to the Lakers. Like his brother Pau, he became an elite rim protector who could pass, shoot, and score efficiently in the post, and later in his career became an example of a "stretch five", a center capable of effective scoring from three-point range. He was also the 2013 NBA Defensive Player of the Year, and he helped the Toronto Raptors win their first championship in 2019.

==== NHL ====
The 1984 NHL entry draft is noted for the unusually high number of future Hall of Famers picked, particularly in lower rounds: Patrick Roy, the only player with three Conn Smythe trophies, was drafted 51st in the third round; Brett Hull, the fifth highest goal scorer of all time, was drafted 117th in the sixth round; and Luc Robitaille, who retired as the highest-scoring left winger in the NHL, was drafted 171st in the ninth round.

Hall of Famer Doug Gilmour was drafted by the St. Louis Blues in the seventh round, 134th overall at the 1982 NHL entry draft; during his career he scored over 1,400 points, won a Stanley Cup and Frank J. Selke Trophy.

Pavel Datsyuk, drafted 171st in the 1998 NHL entry draft, won two Stanley Cups and is considered one of the most talented NHL players of all-time.

The Detroit Red Wings have drafted Nicklas Lidström (53rd in 1989), Sergei Fedorov (74th in 1989), Vladimir Konstantinov (221st in 1989), Tomas Holmström (257th in 1994) and Henrik Zetterberg (210th in 1999) in later rounds, all of whom contributed to one or more of the four Stanley Cup wins, between 1997 and 2008, by the Red Wings.

A similar Stanley Cup legacy was achieved by the Tampa Bay Lightning, drafting Alex Killorn (77th in 2007), Nikita Kucherov (58th in 2011), Ondřej Palát (208th in 2011), Cédric Paquette (101st in 2012), Brayden Point (79th in 2014), Anthony Cirelli (72nd in 2015), Mathieu Joseph (120th in 2015) and Ross Colton (118th in 2016), all of whom contributed to back-to-back Stanley Cups wins by the Lightning in 2020 and 2021.

The Edmonton Oilers dynasty that won 5 Stanley Cups between 1984 to 1990 had several notable draft steals, drafting Mark Messier (48th in 1979), Glenn Anderson (69th in 1979), Jari Kurri (69th in 1980), Andy Moog (132nd in 1980), Steve Smith (111th in 1981), and Esa Tikkanen (80th in 1983). All of whom contributed to 1 of the 5 Stanley Cup wins between 1984 to 1990.

Vezina Trophy winners Dominik Hašek (drafted 199th in 1983), Tim Thomas (drafted 217th in 1994), Miikka Kiprusoff (drafted 116th in 1995), Ryan Miller (drafted 138th in 1999), Henrik Lundqvist (drafted 205th in 2000), Pekka Rinne (drafted 258th in 2004), Braden Holtby (drafted 93rd in 2008), Connor Hellebuyck (drafted 130th in 2012), Linus Ullmark (drafted 163rd in 2012), and Igor Shesterkin (drafted 118th in 2014) were considered some of the best goalie draft steals, with Thomas winning the Conn Smythe Trophy as the most valuable player of the 2011 Stanley Cup playoffs while being the lowest-drafted player to win the award and setting a league record for the most saves by a goaltender in a single postseason.

Pavel Bure was drafted by the Vancouver Canucks in the 6th round, 113th overall, at the 1989 NHL entry draft. Due to international transfer disputes which prompted the Canucks to draft Bure later, he had his rookie season two seasons later in 1991, where he would win the Calder Memorial Trophy for being the most outstanding rookie of that season. Later in his career, Bure won the Maurice "Rocket" Richard Trophy for being the leading goal scorer in 2000 and 2001.

Dave Taylor was drafted by the Los Angeles Kings in the 15th round, 210th overall, at the 1975 NHL amateur draft. Taylor would have a productive 17 season career in the NHL as part of the Triple Crown Line, and still holds the record for being the lowest drafted player to score more than 1,000 points in the NHL.

Theoren Fleury was drafted by the Calgary Flames in the 8th round, 166th overall, at the 1987 NHL entry draft, then scored over 1,000 points, while playing 1,000 games in the NHL between 1989 and 2003.

Daniel Alfredsson was drafted by the Ottawa Senators in the 6th round, 133rd overall, at the 1994 NHL entry draft, in Alfredsson near 20 year career he recorded over 1,000 points and played in over 1,000 games, and help lead the Senators to their first Stanley Cup Final appearance in 2007.

Joe Pavelski was selected by the San Jose Sharks in the seventh round, 205th overall, of the 2003 NHL entry draft, has become one of the best American-born players of his generation. He recorded 1,068 points in 1,332 regular-season NHL games.

Jamie Benn was selected by the Dallas Stars in the 5th round, 129th overall in 2007, became the franchise's sixth captain in 2013, won the Art Ross Trophy in 2015, and recorded his 1,000th point in 2026.

Patric Hörnqvist was drafted last by the Nashville Predators at the 2005 NHL entry draft (230th in the 7th round), then won two Stanley Cups with the Pittsburgh Penguins.

Mark Stone was drafted in the 6th round, 178th overall by the Ottawa Senators, in the 2010 NHL entry draft, and has been nominated for the Frank J. Selke Trophy (awarded to the league's best defensive forward) as a member and now captain of the Vegas Golden Knights, Stone lead the Golden Knights to their first Stanley Cup win in 2023.

Kirill Kaprizov was drafted in the 5th round, 135th overall by the Minnesota Wild. Kaprizov remained in his native Russia to play in the Kontinental Hockey League for four seasons to develop his skills before making his NHL debut in 2021 where he won the Calder Memorial Trophy as rookie of the year. Since then, Kaprizov has been selected as an all-star game player three times in his career.

Late Calgary Flames and Columbus Blue Jackets forward Johnny Gaudreau, who was selected in the 4th round, 104th overall by the Flames in 2011, opted to play college ice hockey in the National Collegiate Athletic Association for three years where he won many accolades in the process, including one Hobey Baker Award for being the most outstanding player in college hockey. Gaudreau had his first full NHL season in 2014, where he was named to the All-Star Game and was a finalist of the Calder Memorial Trophy. Later in his career, Gaudreau would be named to six more all-star games, win the Lady Byng Memorial Trophy for being the most sportsmanlike player of the 2016–17 season, and be named to the First All-Star Team in the 2021–22 season, where he finished second in league scoring with 115 points (40 goals and 75 assists).

==== Australian Football League ====
An example of a draft steal is Hawthorn midfielder Sam Mitchell who was drafted with pick 36 in the 2001 AFL draft. Mitchell went on to become a four-time premiership player, a premiership captain with Hawthorn in 2008, a 2012 Brownlow Medalist, a three-time All-Australian, a five-time Peter Crimmins Medallist and the 2003 AFL Rising Star.

Another example of a draft steal in the AFL is former Essendon midfielder James Hird, who was drafted with pick 79 in the 1990 AFL draft. Hird went on to become a two time premiership player, a premiership captain in 2000, the 1996 Brownlow Medalist, the 2000 Norm Smith Medallist, a five-time All-Australian, a five-time W. S. Crichton Medalist, and a member of the Essendon Team of the Century and the Australian Football Hall of Fame.

Another notable AFL draft steal is Collingwood midfielder Dane Swan, who was drafted with pick 58 in the 2001 AFL draft. Swan became a premiership player with Collingwood, a three-time Copeland Trophy winner, the 2011 Brownlow Medalist and a five-time All-Australian.

Another notable AFL draft steal was West Coast Eagles midfielder Matt Priddis. Priddis was drafted with the 31st Pick in the 2005 Rookie Draft after being overlooked in the previous three national drafts. Priddis would go on to be the winner of the 2014 Brownlow Medal, the first player to do this who was originally drafted in the Rookie draft. In his final season (2017), Priddis became the all-time league leader in tackles and became the first person to reach 1,500 tackles. Priddis also became just the second player to win both the Brownlow Medal and Sandover Medal.

=== Other ===
Mr. Irrelevant is a title given to the last player selected in each year's NFL Draft. The phrase pokes fun at the typically poor chances such a player has of ultimately making an impact in the league, although several went on to productive or notable NFL careers, such as Ryan Succop and Brock Purdy.

Some unusual draft picks in professional sports history have included Taro Tsujimoto, a fictional Japanese ice hockey forward who was drafted in the 1974 NHL amateur draft by the Buffalo Sabres (a move made in protest of the league's decision to hold the draft by phone, in an attempt to discourage the rival WHA); actor John Wayne, who at age 64 was legally drafted by the Atlanta Falcons in the 1971 NFL draft; and Derrell Robertson, a man who was mistakenly drafted by the Ottawa Rough Riders in the 1995 CFL Dispersal Draft for the Las Vegas Posse after his death in the previous year.

== See also ==
- Closed league
- Mock draft
- Salary cap
