= Aeroflot Flight X-167 =

1973 aviation incident in the Soviet Union

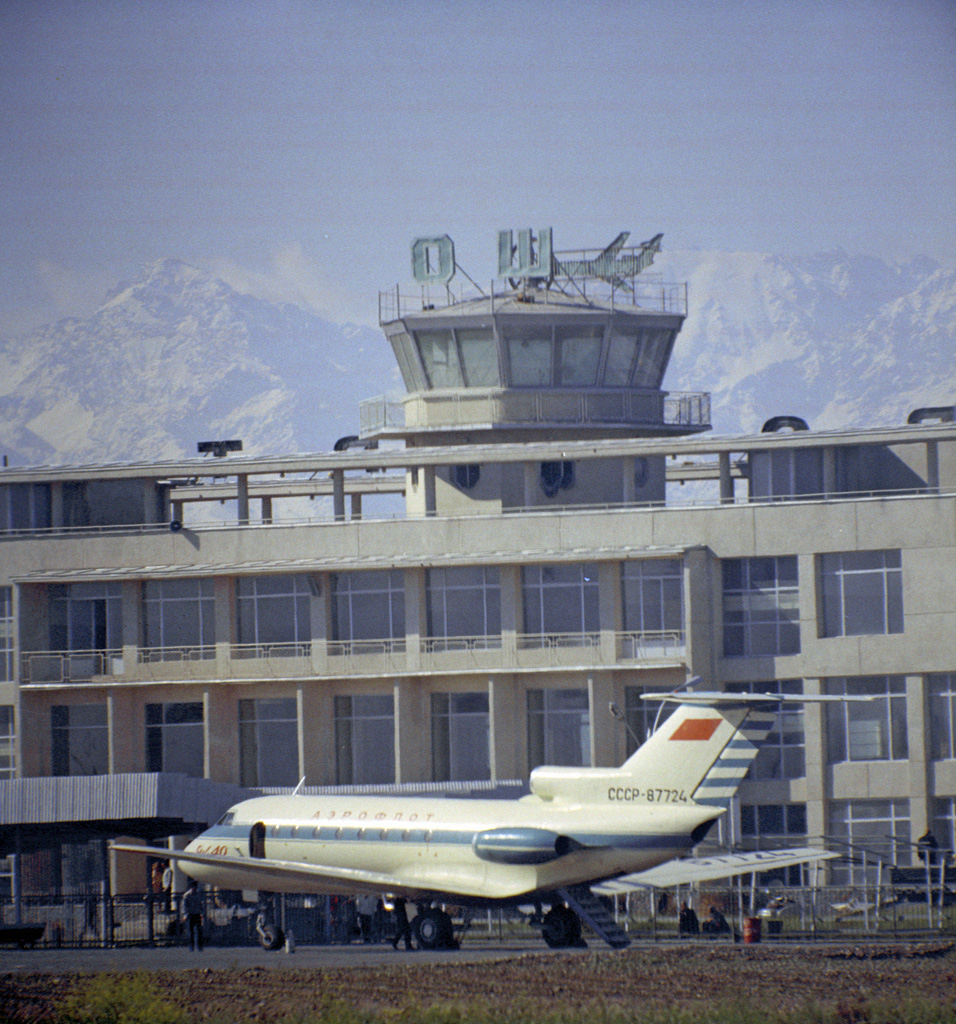
- Yakovlev Yak-40 of Aeroflot

Accident
- Date: 28 February 1973
- Summary: Undetermined
- Site: Semipalatinsk Airport (Kazakh SSR, USSR); 50°19′59″N 80°13′21″E

Aircraft
- Aircraft type: Yakovlev Yak-40
- Operator: Aeroflot (Kazakh Civil Aviation Directorate, Semipalatinsk Separate Aviation Squadron)
- Registration: CCCP-87602
- Flight origin: Semipalatinsk Airport, Semipalatinsk
- Destination: Sary-Arka Airport, Karaganda
- Occupants: 32
- Passengers: 29
- Crew: 3
- Fatalities: 32
- Survivors: 0

Flight X-167 was a scheduled domestic passenger flight operated by Aeroflot from Semipalatinsk (now Semey) to Karaganda on February 28, 1973. The flight, conducted with a Yakovlev Yak-40 aircraft, ended in tragedy when the plane crashed shortly after takeoff, resulting in the deaths of all 32 occupants on board. The exact cause of the accident remains undetermined despite extensive investigation.

== Aircraft ==
The Yak-40 with tail number CCCP-87602 had been manufactured by the Saratov Aviation Plant on 29 April 1971. At the time of the accident, the aircraft had accumulated 1,798 flight hours and 1,814 landings.

== Accident ==
The aircraft was operating flight X-167 from Semipalatinsk to Karaganda. It was piloted by a crew from the 256th Aviation Detachment, consisting of Commander Yuri Ivanovich Sizyakov, co-pilot Vladimir Lukyanovich Keldyshev, and flight engineer Viktor Vasilyevich Tropin. On board were 29 passengers: 27 adults and 2 children. At Semipalatinsk, the sky was overcast, and it was snowing, with visibility of 5 km, and a northwesterly wind (azimuth 290°) at 5 m/s.

At 18:58 local time, one minute after sunset, the Yak-40 took off from Runway 13/31. After climbing to an altitude of 100 m, the aircraft began to rapidly descend, and at 18:59, it struck a snow-covered field 1,457 m from the runway end, 53 m to the left of its centerline. The impact caused the aircraft to bounce into the air, but after flying another 50 m, it crashed again and exploded. The debris was scattered over an area measuring 220 m × 53 m (722 ft × 174 ft). All 32 people on board the aircraft perished.

Among the passengers was the women's basketball team from the Kyzylorda Region — 11 players, a coach, and a referee.

== Investigation ==
According to the air traffic controller, when the aircraft reached an altitude of 70–80 m, there was a large flash of flame. Witnesses on the ground reported seeing sparks falling from the aircraft. However, the crew did not communicate during this time. A hole was also found in the left side of the cockpit windshield, leading to the theory that the aircraft had been struck from the ground. However, an examination showed that this hole was not caused by a bullet or artillery shell but resulted from the Yak-40's impact with the ground. No traces of explosives were found in the cockpit. According to the technical investigation, there was no explosion or fire on board the aircraft during the flight.

The commission did not find any signs of material failures in flight that would have definitively led to the crash. The only significant clue was the stabilizer's deviation to +1 – +1.2°, indicating a nose-down position.

== Causes of the accident ==
Since there were no objective data on the flight modes and trajectory of the Yak-40 from the moment of takeoff until its crash, the commission could not determine the exact cause of the accident. There were two main hypotheses:

1. On the most challenging section of the climb, while retracting the landing gear, flaps, landing lights, and so on, creating a time deficit, the stabilizer spontaneously deflected into a nose-down position. Due to their high workload, the crew could not immediately identify the issue and correct the resulting attitude in time.
2. A violation of the pilots' psychophysiological functions led to significant deviations from the normal piloting process.

== See also ==
- List of accidents involving sports teams
