= Anthony Nwaigwe =

Nigerian footballer (born 1973)

Anthony Nwaigwe (born 22 October 1973) is a Nigerian former professional footballer who played as striker. He was a member of the Iwuanyanwu Nationale team whose plane, Oriental Airline BAC I-U crashed in 1994, while conveying them back home after the Champions Cup outing in Tunis.

== Career ==
Nwaigwe joined ACB Lagos in 1989 and moved to Iwuanyanwu Nationale in 1990 before joining Enugu Rangers in 1995. He started his international football career with Africa Sports National in 1996 from where he moved to Al-Ahli Dubai in 1998. He played for K.F.C. Denderleeuw Eendracht Hekelgem in Belgium, also simply known as "Dender" or "Verbroedering Dender", between 2001 and 2002. He played for the Nigeria national team under coach Clemens Westerhof and made twelve (12) appearances. He also played a 1994 FIFA World Cup qualifying match for the Super Eagles.

== Honours ==
Enugu Rangers

- WAFU Cup: 1996

Iwuanyanwu Nationale

- Nigerian Premier League: 1993

Individual

- Nigerian Premier League top goalscorer: 1991, 1993, 1995
