= 1994 Oriental Airlines BAC One-Eleven crash =

1994 aviation accident in Algeria

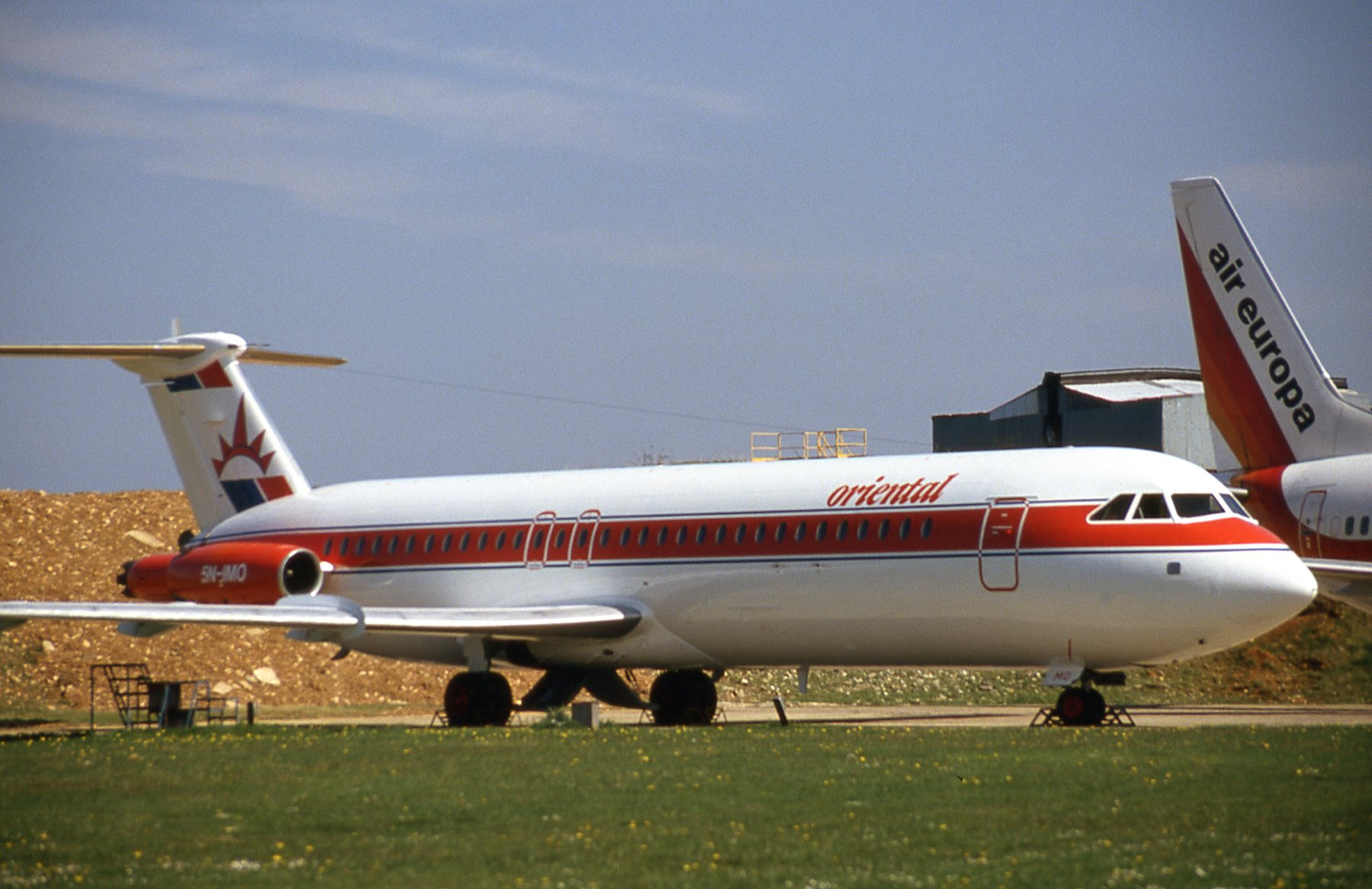
- 5N-IMO, the aircraft involved in the accident, seen in April 1994

Accident
- Date: 18 September 1994
- Summary: Crash on landing due to fuel exhaustion
- Site: Aguenar – Hadj Bey Akhamok Airport, Tamanrasset, Algeria

Aircraft
- Aircraft type: BAC One-Eleven
- Operator: Oriental Airlines
- Registration: 5N-IMO
- Flight origin: Tunis, Tunisia
- Stopover: Tamanrasset, Algeria
- Destination: Lagos, Nigeria
- Occupants: 39
- Passengers: 32
- Crew: 7
- Fatalities: 5
- Survivors: 34

On 18 September 1994, an Oriental Airlines BAC One-Eleven (registration 5N-IMO) crashed during an attempted landing at Aguenar – Hadj Bey Akhamok Airport in Tamanrasset, Algeria. The crash resulted in five fatalities—two passengers and three crew members. The charter flight, traveling from Tunis, Tunisia, to Lagos, Nigeria, was arranged to return the Nigerian football team Iwuanyanwu Nationale (now Heartland FC) following an away match against Espérance.

== Background ==
=== Aircraft and operator ===
The aircraft involved in the crash was a BAC 1-11-515FB, a twin-engined, narrow-body, medium-haul jet built in 1970 with serial number 229. Manufactured in the United Kingdom, it was powered by two Rolls-Royce Spey 512-14DW engines.

The aircraft began operations with Oriental Airways under the registration 5N-IMO on 17 March 1994. The airline was owned by Emmanuel Iwuanyanwu, then-owner of Iwuanyanwu Nationale.

=== Football context ===
Iwuanyanwu Nationale qualified for the 1994 African Cup of Champions Clubs after winning the 1993 Nigerian Premier League. The team advanced through the first two rounds, defeating Nigerien side Zumunta AC and Cameroonian team RC Bafoussam. They faced Tunisian champions Espérance in the quarterfinals but lost 3–0 in the first leg in Tunis.

== Flight and crash ==
At the time of the accident, Tamanrasset, Algeria, was experiencing poor visibility due to early morning dust haze. The return flight to Nigeria had already been delayed by over three hours owing to disputes over fuel costs. Limited fuel and adverse weather conditions forced the pilots to divert to Tamanrasset. Three landing attempts were aborted as the captain was unable to establish visual contact with the runway.

During the fourth landing attempt, 83 minutes after the initial approach, the aircraft was not aligned with either runway and landed in an unstable configuration. Upon touchdown, it began to break apart, colliding with a light pole and a building before coming to rest off the runway. Survivor Anthony Nwaigwe recounted that the aircraft broke into three sections, enabling some passengers to escape. The crash resulted in the deaths of two passengers and three crew members, while many of the 34 other occupants sustained injuries.

== Victims ==
=== Crew ===
- Chinedu Ogbonna (pilot)
- Chukwuwenyi Amaechi (pilot)
- Obiageli Ezeh (air steward)

=== Footballers ===
- Omalie Aimuanmwosari
- Uche Ikeogu

== Notable survivors ==
- Anthony Nwaigwe
- Christian Chukwu

== See also ==
- List of accidents involving sports teams
