= LAN-Chile Flight 107 =

1965 aviation accident

Coordinates: 33°52′16″S 70°02′37″W

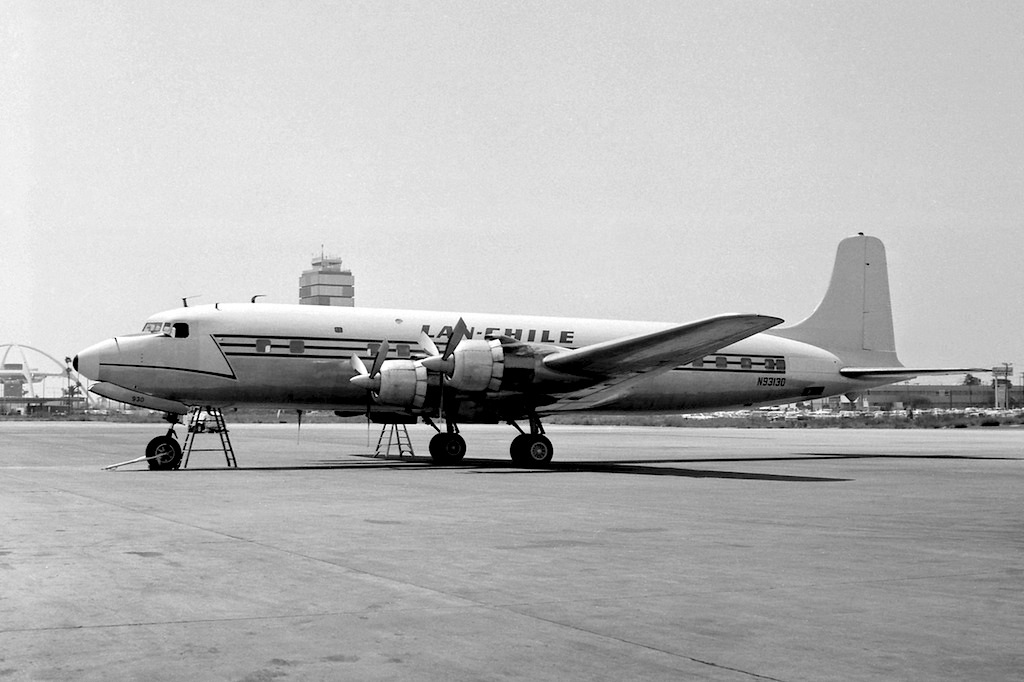
- A Douglas DC-6 of LAN Chile, similar to the aircraft involved in the accident

Accident
- Date: 6 February 1965
- Summary: Pilot error, controlled flight into terrain
- Site: Near San José Volcano, Chile

Aircraft
- Aircraft type: Douglas DC-6B-404
- Operator: LAN Chile
- Call sign: LAN CHILE 107
- Registration: CC-CCG
- Flight origin: Los Cerrillos Airport, Santiago, Chile
- Destination: Ministro Pistarini International Airport, Ezeiza, Argentina
- Occupants: 88
- Passengers: 81
- Crew: 7
- Fatalities: 88
- Survivors: 0

LAN-Chile Flight 107 was a regular scheduled international flight from the Chilean capital Santiago to Buenos Aires in Argentina. On 6 February 1965, the Douglas DC-6B-404 operating the flight crashed in the Andes. All 88 occupants of the aircraft died in the crash.

== Accident ==
The DC-6 departed from Santiago-Los Cerrillos Airport on the morning of 6 February with 80 passengers and seven crew members on board, on a flight to Ministro Pistarini International Airport in Ezeiza, near Buenos Aires. When the aircraft was at flight level 120, in the Las Melosas area of the Andes, it crashed into the side of La Corona Mountain, approximately 370 metres (1,200 ft) below its summit. There were no survivors.

Twenty-two of the passengers had been players and staff of Santiago's Antonio Varas football team, who were on their way to Uruguay for a match against the Camadeo team in Montevideo.

As of 2021, Flight 107 was the deadliest aviation disaster in Chilean history and the second-deadliest aviation accident involving a DC-6, behind Olympic Airways Flight 954.

== Cause ==
The accident investigation board attributed the accident to the pilot in command of the aircraft, who chose to follow a route that was neither in accordance with the approved flight plan nor the airline's operations manual. Weather was not a factor in the crash.

== See also ==
- List of accidents involving sports teams
- LAN-Chile Flight 621
