= Oklahoma State Cowboys basketball team plane crash =

2001 aviation accident in the United States

Oklahoma State basketball team plane crash
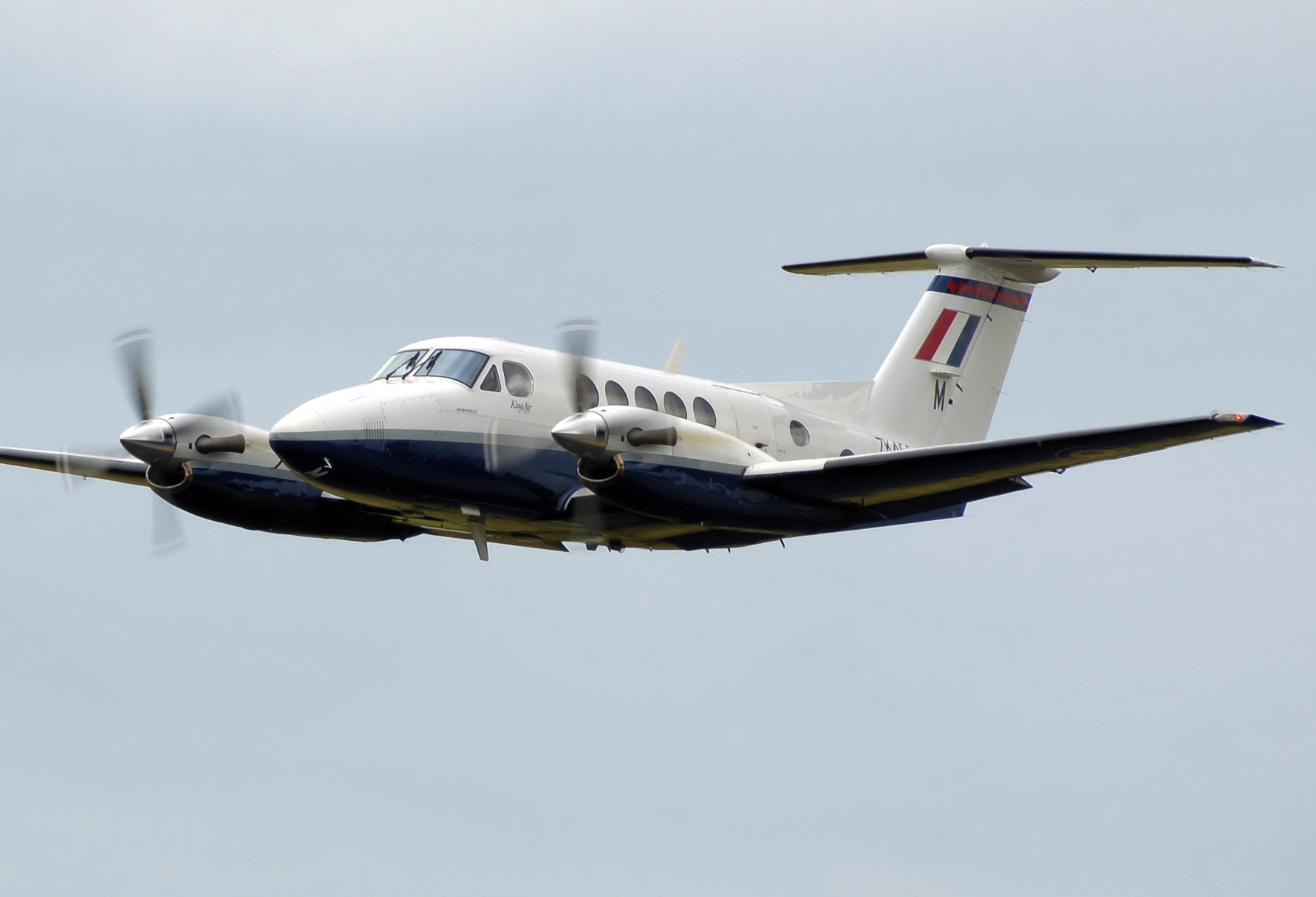
- Beechcraft Super King Air 200 similar to accident aircraft

Accident
- Date: January 27, 2001
- Summary: Spatial disorientation in snow storm
- Site: Strasburg, Colorado, United States; 39°44′48″N 104°15′0″W

Aircraft
- Aircraft type: Beechcraft Super King Air 200
- Operator: Jet Express Services
- Registration: N81PF
- Passengers: 8
- Crew: 2
- Fatalities: 10
- Survivors: 0

The Oklahoma State University Cowboys basketball team plane crash occurred on January 27, 2001, at 19:37 EST, when a Beechcraft Super King Air 200, registration N81PF, carrying two players on the Oklahoma State Cowboys basketball team along with six Oklahoma State broadcasters and members of the Oklahoma State coaching staff, crashed in a field 40 miles (64 km) east of Denver, near Strasburg, in the U.S. state of Colorado. The pilot had likely become disoriented, caused by equipment and instrument failure during snow storm. The plane was flying from Jefferson County Airport to Stillwater Regional Airport after the team's loss to the Colorado Buffaloes.

== Accident ==
The aircraft was carrying two crew members (pilot Denver Mills, age 55, and co-pilot Bjorn Fahlstrom, age 30) and eight passengers involved with Oklahoma State basketball. Both pilots were certified flight instructors and held the proper transport licenses to carry passengers, but only the Pilot in Command (PIC) was type-rated on the King Air. All ten occupants aboard were killed, and the plane was destroyed by inflight-breakup and postcrash fire." Oklahoma State has a memorial erected to them, entitled "Remember the Ten", inside Gallagher-Iba Arena in Stillwater, Oklahoma.

== Investigation ==
Post-accident investigation conducted by the National Transportation Safety Board (NTSB), published two years after the incident, determined the probable cause of the accident "was the pilot’s spatial disorientation resulting from his failure to maintain positive manual control of the airplane with the available flight instrumentation." A contributing factor was "the loss of a.c. electrical power during instrument meteorological conditions," which caused the pilot to lose most of the pilot-side instruments, including altimeter, attitude indicator, horizontal situation indicator (HSI), radio altimeter, RMI, and altitude preselect. Although the copilot's side may have had more working flight instruments, making it possible he could have provided assistance to the pilot-in-command (PIC), he had no formal King Air training, likely making him unfamiliar with the airplane’s systems and emergency procedures needed to act as pilot flying (PF).

Weather reports issued by the National Weather Service (NWS) during the time of the flight in eastern Colorado told pilots to expect clouds at 200 to 400 feet, with moderate rime icing to mixed icing in precipitation under 22,000 feet and moderate turbulence below 18,000 feet. According to NTSB investigators, scientists competent in airplane-ice-modeling indicated a "fairly low threat" of icing on the accident plane, and there were no pilot reports of inflight icing in the area at the time of the accident.

The "radar data, ground scars, and wreckage distribution" of the plane at the accident site, 42 miles east of the departure airport, indicated the plane crashed into terrain at a less steep angle than it descended, indicating the pilot "attempted to arrest the descent in the final portion of the flight, possibly in response to obtaining visual references of the ground after emerging from the lowest layer of clouds." But the pilot's attempt to forcefully recover the aircraft from its rapid descent (estimated at more than 15,000 feet per minute for the final two minutes, as the airplane completed a 360º "graveyard spiral" turn) and "the airplane reaction required to arrest the descent rate with the available altitude" placed a large aerodynamic load on the plane, causing it "to break apart in flight at a low altitude" (within several hundred feet of the ground) -- a finding consistent with the "scattered debris found at the accident site."

The NTSB concluded that despite the failures of instrumentation, the situation should have been recoverable had the PIC "appropriately manage the workload associated with troubleshooting the loss of a.c. electrical power with the need to establish and maintain positive control of the airplane." In other words, he failed to AVIATE, the first tenet in the expression "Aviate, Navigate, Communicate."

== See also ==
- List of accidents involving sports teams
- 2011 Arkansas Piper Cherokee crash – the second plane crash in 10 years to involve an Oklahoma State basketball team
