= Viloco =

Coordinates: 16.874°S 67.499°W

Viloco Wiluqu
- Town
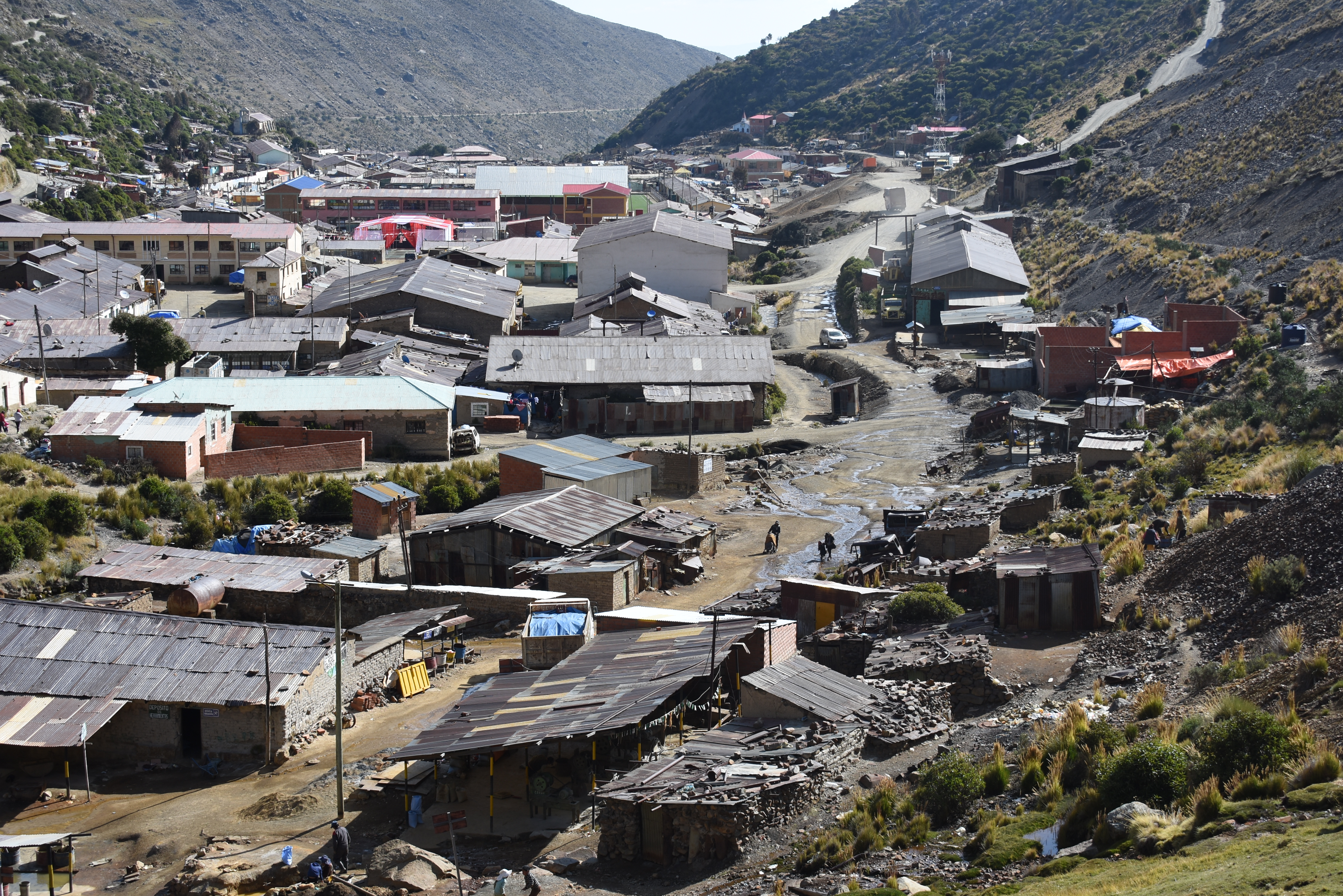
- Interactive map of Viloco
- Country: Bolivia
- Department: La Paz Department
- Province: Loayza Province
- Municipality: Cairoma Municipality
- Time zone: UTC-4 (BOT)

Viloco (Aymara Wiluqu, a kind of bird) is a small town in Bolivia located in the La Paz Department, Loayza Province, Cairoma Municipality.
