= LAN-Chile Flight 621 =

1961 aviation accident

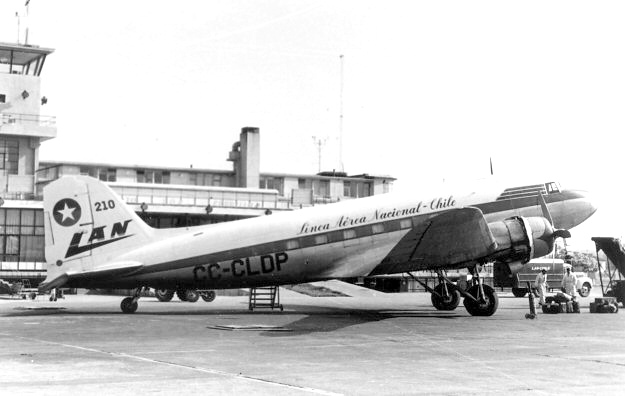
- CC-CLDP, the aircraft involved in the accident.

Accident
- Date: 3 April 1961
- Summary: Undetermined, but most likely controlled flight into terrain or stall due to ice on wings
- Site: La Gotera Hill, Chile; 35°59′09.6″S 71°07′33.6″W

Aircraft
- Aircraft type: Douglas DC-3
- Operator: LAN Chile
- Registration: CC-CLDP
- Flight origin: Temuco
- Destination: Santiago
- Passengers: 20
- Crew: 4
- Fatalities: 24
- Survivors: 0

LAN-Chile Flight 621 crashed in the Andes on 3 April 1961. All twenty-four people on board were killed, including eight professional footballers and two members of the coaching staff from CD Green Cross. It was Chile's worst ever aviation disaster at the time.

== Aircraft ==
The accident aircraft was a Douglas DC-3, registration CC-CLDP. It had been manufactured in 1943 as a military Douglas C-47A, manufacturer's serial number 9716. At the time of the accident, it had accumulated 18,300 hours.

== Accident ==
The Douglas DC-3 airliner was one of two aircraft used to transport the football team home after an away game. It was on a domestic flight from Castro to Santiago when it disappeared in the Andes. The last radio message reported ice covering the wings and propellers.

The tail of the aircraft and a few human remains were found on 10 April 1961. Some official accounts indicate the wreckage was located on La Gotera Hill in the Lastima-Pejerreymin Range; all on board had been assumed killed. Other contemporary accounts identify the crash site as Cerro Lastimas.

In February 2015 the aircraft's fuselage was discovered after more than 50 years in the Chilean Andes. A member of the expedition that found the wreckage was quoted as saying "So this story is getting a rewrite since this is not where original accounts said." While the climbers declined to provide a detailed position of their find, it is consistent with the terrain and altitude of Cerro Lastimas.

== Notable victims ==
- Eliseo Mouriño
- Berty Gonzalez

== See also ==
- List of accidents involving sports teams
- LAN-Chile Flight 107
