= Gallagher-Iba Arena =

Basketball and wrestling venue

- "The Rowdiest Arena in the Country" "The Madison Square Garden of The Plains" "Mr. Iba's House of Horrors"
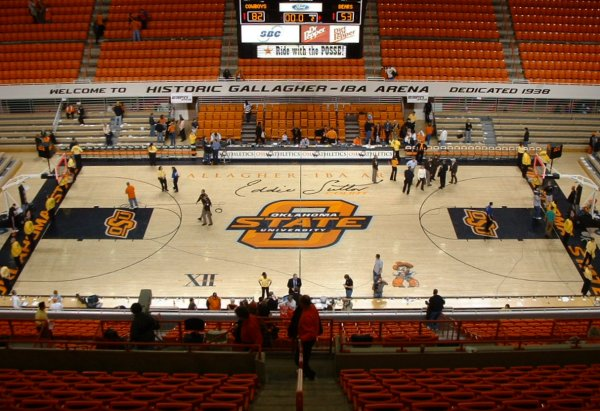
- Interactive map of Gallagher-Iba Arena
- Former names: 4-H Clubs and Student Activities Building (1938–c.1939); Gallagher Hall (1939–1987)
- Location: 1046 West Hall of Fame Avenue; Stillwater, OK 74078
- Coordinates: 36°07′33″N 97°3′54″W
- Owner: Oklahoma State University
- Operator: Oklahoma State University
- Capacity: 13,611 (2000–present); 6,381 (1986–2000); 6,750 (1983–1986); 7,200 (1959–1983); 9,000 (1938–1959)
- Surface: White Maple basketball court (original 1938 court)

Construction
- Groundbreaking: February 25, 1938
- Opened: December 9, 1938
- Renovated: 1986, 2000
- Cost: $1.5 million (original) ($34.3 million in 2025 dollars) $55 million (Renovation)
- Architect: Crafton Tull Sparks (Renovation)

Tenant
- Oklahoma State Cowboys and Cowgirls (NCAA DI) (1938–present)

Gallagher-Iba Arena, also known as "The Rowdiest Arena in the Country" and "The Madison Square Garden of the Plains”, is the basketball and wrestling venue at Oklahoma State University in Stillwater, Oklahoma, United States. Originally completed in 1938 and named the 4-H Club and Student Activities Building, it was soon renamed Gallagher Hall to honor wrestling coach Ed Gallagher. After renovations in 1987, the name became Gallagher-Iba Arena, as a tribute to longtime basketball coach and innovator Henry Iba.

== History ==
The first basketball game was played on December 9, 1938, when Iba's Oklahoma A&M Aggies beat Phog Allen's Kansas Jayhawks, 21–15, in a battle between two of the nation's early basketball powers. In its original configuration, seating was limited to 9,000. The original maple floor, still in use today, was the most expensive of its kind in America when it was installed in 1938.

The first wrestling duel in the newly renamed Gallagher Hall was held on January 27, 1939, against Indiana with A&M winning 18–6. The distinction of being the first A&M (Oklahoma State) wrestler to compete in Gallagher Hall goes to three-time NCAA champion Joe McDaniel of Sulphur, OK. McDaniel defeated Donnacher of Indiana, 13–2.

On February 3, 1989, the Oklahoma State Cowboys hosted the Hoosiers in a celebration of the 50-year anniversary of the first Gallagher Hall dual. The Cowboys defeated the Hoosiers, 28–6.

Former wrestling coach Myron Roderick claimed that during the 1978 Big 8 Conference Finals, over 9,000 fans packed the old barn and saw unranked Daryl Monasmith beat the defending national champion from Iowa State, Frank Santana. According to Roderick, "It got so loud, a lot of the lights busted in Gallagher. And that is the loudest I've ever heard it. It was unbelievable."

== "Gallagher's House of Horrors" ==
The Pokes set a new wrestling attendance record in the first season after expansion, packing in 10,802 for Bedlam on February 18, 2001. Previously, the largest crowd was estimated at 8,300. On February 19, 2017 the wrestling team set the All-Time Gallagher-Iba Arena Attendance Record when they hosted 14,059 spectators for their dual with Penn State. The dual's attendance broke a record set 10 years prior when the men's basketball team played Missouri in front of 14,044 fan. Since wrestling began in Gallagher-Iba Arena, the Cowboys have won 34 NCAA titles and have had 34 unbeaten and untied campaigns at home. One of their longest winning streaks ran with the arena's opening in 1939 and lasted until February 16, 1951. During that period, Oklahoma State won 37 straight home duals, including no ties. From the final dual of 1959 through the first five home duals of the 1967 season, Oklahoma State wrestled 61 duals without a loss, finishing with an impressive 60–0–1 record before the streak was broken by Bedlam rival Oklahoma 19–13. On February 3, 1939, Oklahoma A&M wrestled for the first time inside the arena, defeating Indiana 18–6. On February 3, 1989, the Oklahoma State Cowboys hosted the Hoosiers in a celebration of the 50-year anniversary of the first Gallagher Hall dual. The Cowboys defeated the Hoosiers, 28–6, in the 1989 dual. OSU's latest home winning streak of 50 consecutive duals was the second-longest such streak without a loss or tie (it began near the end of the 1986 season). That streak came to an end on January 30, 1993, when Penn State handed the Pokes a sound 38–7 defeat, Oklahoma State's worst loss ever on its home mat. In only five seasons have OSU teams lost more than one home dual during the season, including the 1992–93 season when OSU finished below .500 for the first time ever in Gallagher-Iba Arena. In contrast, six Cowboy teams have won at least 10 home duals during a single season.

== The modern Gallagher-Iba ==
In the 1990s, Oklahoma State was in desperate need of a larger basketball arena. Instead of building a new arena off campus, the decision was made to expand Gallagher-Iba Arena from a modest 6,381 seats to its current 13,611 seats. The structure of the new Gallagher-Iba Arena was built around the old arena during the basketball season to allow games to be played; essentially the new Athletics Center encapsulated the old gym. Once the exterior was nearly completed, the roof of the old arena was dismantled. The old sightlines and the original white maple floor were kept (it remains the oldest original basketball court floor still in use). The expansion, completed in time for the 2000 Cowboy basketball season, cost $55 million and was designed by Gary Sparks and built by Manhattan Construction. The Cowboys opened the new Gallagher-Iba Arena with a 70–60 victory over the Arkansas-Little Rock Trojans.

Gallagher-Iba Arena was named the best college gymnasium by CBS SportsLine.com in August 2001.

On January 15, 2005, the court was officially named after Eddie Sutton as Eddie Sutton Court.

On March 4, 2005, ESPNU held its debut, which was simulcast on ESPN2, at Gallagher-Iba Arena. To commemorate the event, 3 Doors Down provided a free concert at the arena. The OSU Basketball team and coaches, including Eddie Sutton, were present at the event.

On January 12, 2008, Gallagher-Iba played host to the highest attended women's sporting event in the state of Oklahoma 13,611 (a sellout) as the OSU Cowgirls beat the Oklahoma Sooners in basketball 82–63.

Along with the expansion of the historic arena, the new Athletics Center has many features. A total of 14 luxury suites stretch across the west side of the facility, overlooking both the basketball court and the football field. Banners signifying the success of Oklahoma State Athletics are hung from the rafters, as well as a banner commemorating the loss of 10 members of the OSU basketball family when they were killed in a plane crash in Colorado and a banner commemorating the 4, including the women's basketball team coaches, who died in a plane crash over Arkansas in 2011. The pride of OSU athletic triumphs are also illustrated in photographic and trophy displays in "Heritage Hall", the west first floor hallway.

In the southeast concourse, two seats are permanently reserved for the arena's namesakes.

== Spirit Rider ==
The original Spirit Rider statue sits outside of the Sherman E. Smith training facility across from Boone Pickens Stadium. The Spirit Rider wears a cowboy hat, rides a black horse named Bullet, and carries an OSU flag.

The Spirit Rider can also be found inside the arena in the southwest corner. This Spirit Rider kneels with his hat off, in front of a memorial for the 10 men who died in a 2001 plane crash.

== Camp Sutton ==
Oklahoma State students have begun referring to their temporary towns as "Camp Sutton", in honor of the late head coach Eddie Sutton. Twin cities of tents are pitched on the north and south sides of the arena, in hopes of securing floor seats in either the northside or southside student sections. In recent years, Camp Sutton has grown into an increasingly over-the-top affair. Many students played a part in the Camp Sutton campout from January 11, 2007, to February 27, 2007 (four days before the Texas game and up to the K-State game). The camp lasted from the second Oklahoma State University Big 12 home game to the last Big 12 home game of the season. Several groups of student campers from the Northside Nasties and the Southside Savages all joined and lived under over 1,700 square feet (160 m^{2}) of tarps duct taped and tied together, nicknamed the Thunderdome. It was occupied every day (except times during sporting events) for the entire campout.

Although students had camped outside Gallagher-Iba Arena for years, the name Camp Sutton was added during January 2006. Coincidentally, this would be Eddie's last season as head coach. Students are now required to register tents in order of arrival, beginning four days before the game and continuing on. During this time period, at least one member of the "tent" was required to be present. A tent being ten people or less, this means that several students weathered freezing temperatures and sleepless nights in order to obtain seating to basketball games.

The first game under the new procedures was the Bedlam game of 2006, with over 55 tents registering. The new policy was so successful that around 400 students were granted admission in six minutes, and the Athletic Department saw the value of providing safe and fair admissions to students based upon arrival times.

During the 2006–07 men's basketball season, the camp was moved to the south side of Boone Pickens Stadium. This was done to provide more electrical outlets to the campers, and to provide a wind block from the prevailing northerly, and generally quite strong, Oklahoma winter winds. The policy was in effect from the second home Big 12 game until the last Big 12 home game of the season.

== See also ==
- List of NCAA Division I basketball arenas
