= Disaster draft =

Disaster recovery plan for professional sports teams

A disaster draft or contingency draft is a disaster recovery plan developed by professional sports leagues to rebuild a team's roster if many players are disabled or killed.

== Special procedures ==
An affected team is expected to replace players using the minor leagues and by signing free agents. Each league has established procedures to decide whether an accident is of sufficient scale to activate contingency plans to help rebuild an affected team's roster, typically involving a special draft.

=== Major League Baseball ===
Major League Baseball's disaster plan is covered in Rule 19 of The Official Professional Baseball Rules Book. The plan is triggered by an event causing the death, dismemberment, or permanent disability of at least five players from a team's active, injured, or suspended roster during a season (including the playoffs), or at least six players during the off-season. Major League Baseball's commissioner will decide if the disabled club can continue play, in consultation with the MLB Players' Association and the club.

If the commissioner decides that the disabled club will continue to play, the commissioner may hold a Restocking Draft to allow the disabled club to select as many players as it lost, with the restriction that no more than one player can be selected from each team. Each of the non-disabled teams makes five players available for the draft taken from its active list (or if during the off-season, from its reserve list), composed of one pitcher, one catcher, one outfielder, one infielder, and one more player of any position, subject to adjustments by the commissioner based on the players lost by the disabled club. If a team has fewer than three eligible catchers, it does not have to provide a catcher to the draft. The non-disabled teams also are required to make available as many players with 60 or more days of Major League service time as of 31 August of the season preceding such draft as the number of such players lost by the disabled team. Any player with no-trade rights with regards to the disabled team may not be made available unless the player waives the right.

If the commissioner decides that the disabled club cannot continue play, the commissioner will cancel the disabled club's season. The commissioner and Players' Association can also agree upon other appropriate relief for a disabled club. Major League Baseball's first expansion drafts of the early 1960s were based largely on the procedures first set out for the disaster draft.

=== National Basketball Association ===
The National Basketball Association (NBA) contingency plan activates if five or more players on a team "die or are dismembered". A special "disaster draft" would be held in which other NBA teams could only protect five players, so that quality sixth men would be available. No more than one player would be drafted from a team.

=== National Football League ===
The National Football League (NFL)'s contingency plan provides for both a "near-disaster" and a "disaster". A "near-disaster" is defined as fewer than 15 players on a team being disabled, and a "disaster" is 15 or more.

No special draft would be held for a "near-disaster"; the team would instead get preferential rights on any waivers until the end of the season. If a quarterback is among the fewer than 15 lost, the team would be able to draft up to two quarterbacks from all NFL teams with three available. Each team would be able to protect two, and the drafted quarterbacks would return to their original teams in the following season.

For a "disaster", the commissioner would determine whether to cancel the team's schedule for the season. If the team's season is canceled, the team would have the first pick in the next regular draft; a special draft would also be held in which each team would be able to protect 32 players. If not canceled, the "near-disaster" procedures would be used.

=== National Hockey League ===
The National Hockey League (NHL) contingency plan activates if five or more players on a team "are killed or disabled." When activated, this contingency plan requires an affected team to fill their roster with players from other teams up to a minimum of one goaltender and 14 skaters. After this threshold is reached, the affected team may either continue to select players from other teams or fill its remaining roster spots with call-ups from its minor league affiliates or newly signed free agents.

The affected team is first allowed to purchase the contracts of players from other NHL teams, paying with funds from a special insurance fund. At this stage, teams are not obligated to sell contracts to the affected team. If after these purchases its roster has fewer than one goaltender and 14 skaters, an emergency rehabilitation draft is held. In an emergency rehabilitation draft, each team is able to protect one goaltender and 10 skaters, and teams that lost players due to contract purchase are exempt. No team can lose more than one player in an emergency rehabilitation draft.

=== Major League Soccer ===
Within its roster regulations, Major League Soccer has what it refers to as an "extreme hardship" provision, which can be used if "a team has less than 15 available players". However, this is a mechanism intended to be used on a "game-by-game basis", and any contingency plans that may exist for a disaster draft scenario are not public.

=== Kontinental Hockey League ===
The Kontinental Hockey League (KHL) contingency plan was implemented after the 2011 Lokomotiv Yaroslavl plane crash that killed the team's entire traveling roster. In the policy, each team makes three players eligible for the disaster draft, with the team that suffered the disaster being able to call up five players from its farm teams. There is no mention of a goaltender minimum for the draft, unlike the NFL disaster draft on quarterbacks or NHL disaster draft on goaltenders, or a mention of a team being able to surrender only one player, unlike other leagues, in the draft. Until 2016, the afflicted team would have had have a spot in the draft lottery, thus guaranteeing that the team would have picked at least as high as 4th overall in the next KHL Junior Draft and it would also have been able to protect any player it wants for the next five entry drafts.
