= Stillwater Regional Airport =

Airport in Oklahoma, United States

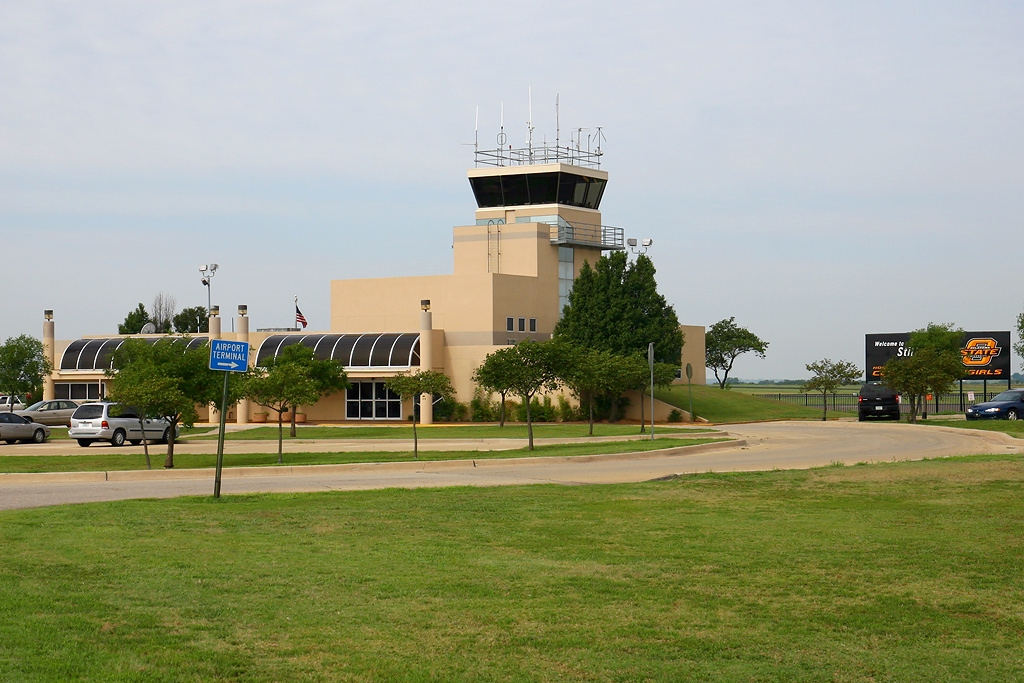
- IATA: SWO; ICAO: KSWO; FAA LID: SWO

Summary
- Airport type: Public
- Owner: City of Stillwater
- Serves: Stillwater, Oklahoma
- Opened: May 1943
- Time zone: CST (UTC−06:00)
  - Summer (DST): CDT (UTC−05:00)
- Elevation AMSL: 1,000 ft (300 m)
- Coordinates: 36°09′41″N 097°05′09″W
- Website: http://flystillwaterok.com/

Map
- Location of airport in Oklahoma SWO (the United States)

Runways
Direction	Length		Surface
Direction	ft	m	Surface
17/35	7,401	2,256	Concrete
4/22	5,002	1,525	Asphalt

Statistics (12 months ending January 2025 ^{except where noted})
- Passenger volume: 65,200
- Departing passengers: 33,250
- Scheduled flights: 730
- Cargo (lb.): 43k
- Aircraft operations (2023): 77,524
- Based aircraft (2024): 90
- Source: Federal Aviation Administration RITA

Stillwater Regional Airport (IATA: SWO, ICAO: KSWO, FAA LID: SWO) is in Payne County, Oklahoma, United States, three miles (4.8 km) northwest of Stillwater.

== History ==
After World War II the airfield was one of six locations in the nation that stored surplus military aircraft; about 475 were flown to the airport starting in 1945. In 1946 Paul Mantz bought them all, keeping 12 for use as stunt planes and camera ships and selling the rest for scrap.

One of the aircraft at Stillwater – purchased by Mantz – was B-17 41-24577 "Hells Angels," the first B-17 to complete 25 missions (even before the Memphis Belle).

== Historical airline service ==
Central Airlines Douglas DC-3s landed at Stillwater beginning in 1953 with flights to Oklahoma City and Tulsa. Central merged with the original Frontier Airlines in 1967, and service was then provided with flights between Kansas City and Dallas/Fort Worth that stopped at Stillwater and many other points. Frontier upgraded service using the Convair 580 aircraft until flights ended in late 1975. Stillwater then went without commercial air service until 1980.

Metro Airlines began serving Stillwater in 1980 with flights to Oklahoma City using de Havilland Canada DHC-6 Twin Otters. Service continued until 1985 when Exec Express, Inc. took over servicing Stillwater with flights to Tulsa, using Piper PA-31 Navajo commuter planes. Stillwater was the home for Exec Express, but their service was short-lived, ending within one year as the airline focused on providing Essential Air Service to the nearby communities of Enid and Ponca City, Oklahoma. Stillwater then went without commercial air service.

After thirty years with no airline flights, local efforts landed American Airlines regional partner Envoy Air to Stillwater, operating as American Eagle. Service began on August 23, 2016, using Embraer-145 regional jets nonstop to Dallas/Fort Worth International Airport. Two daily flights are operated, with a third flight during busier periods.

Many Oklahoma State University teams and those who visit the Cowboys fly into Stillwater on small chartered planes. The Cowboy football team and opponents also frequently fly in and out of the airport.

== Facilities ==
The airport covers 1,571 acres (636 ha) at an elevation of 1,000 feet (305 m). It has two runways: the primary runway 17/35 is 7,401 by 100 feet (2,256 x 30 m) concrete; and the crosswind runway 4/22 is 5,002 by 75 feet (1,525 x 23 m) asphalt.

In the year ending December 31, 2023 the airport had 77,524 aircraft operations, an average of 212 per day: 94% general aviation, 2% military, 3% air taxi and 1% commercial airline. In August 2024, there were 90 aircraft based at this airport: 85 single-engine and 5 multi-engine.

The airport is home to the Oklahoma State University Flight Center, which trains students majoring or minoring in Aerospace Administration and Operations with a concentration in professional pilot. Their fleet consists of 5 Cessna 152s, 17 Cessna 172s, a Cessna 182, 14 Cirrus SR-20s, and 4 Piper PA-44s.

== Airline and destination ==
Airlines	Destinations
American Eagle	Dallas/Fort Worth

Destinations map
Destinations from Stillwater Regional Airport
Red = Year-round destination
Green = Seasonal destination
Blue = Future destination

== Statistics ==
Top domestic destinations (February 2024 – January 2025)
Rank	Airport	Passengers	Airline
1	Dallas/Fort Worth	33,250	American Eagle

== See also ==
- List of airports in Oklahoma
