= Deaths in September 2011 =

The following people died in September 2011.

Entries for each day are listed alphabetically by surname. A typical entry lists information in the following sequence:

- Name, age, country of citizenship at birth, subsequent country of citizenship (if applicable), reason for notability, cause of death (if known), and reference.

== September 2011 ==
=== 1 ===
- Sidney Asch, 92, American lawyer, judge, and author.
- Mark Blackburn, 58, British numismatist, cancer.
- Jan Lammers, 84, Dutch Olympic athlete (1948).
- Liu Huang A-tao, 90, Taiwanese activist, first comfort woman to sue Japan for compensation.
- Abdulrahman al-Nuaimi, 67, Bahraini opposition leader, founder of the PFLB and the NDA.
- Alexandru Pesamosca, 81, Romanian surgeon and pediatrician, cardiac arrest.
- Kamal Salibi, 82, Lebanese historian.

=== 2 ===
- Edgar Benson, 88, Canadian politician and diplomat.
- Roberto Bruce, 32, Chilean television journalist, plane crash.
- Felipe Camiroaga, 44, Chilean television presenter, plane crash.
- Tony Corsari, 84, Belgian television host, cancer.
- Allan Hubbard, 83, New Zealand businessman, car accident.
- Shrinivas Khale, 85, Indian composer.
- Lennart Magnusson, 87, Swedish Olympic silver medal-winning (1952) fencer.
- Herbert Mataré, 98, German physicist, European co-inventor of the transistor.
- José María Montes, 91, Argentine Roman Catholic prelate, Bishop of Chascomús (1983–1996).
- Katsuichi Mori, 81, Japanese Olympic diver.
- Noramfaizul Mohd Nor, 39, Malaysian television camera operator (Bernama), shot.
- Trulshik Rinpoche, 88, Tibetan lama.
- Jehangir Sabavala, 89, Indian artist.
- Bernard Smith, 94, Australian art historian and critic.
- Alberto Zalamea Costa, 82, Colombian journalist and politician, Ambassador to Côte d'Ivoire, Venezuela and Italy.

=== 3 ===
- Renato Barisani, 92, Italian sculptor and painter.
- Júlia Bonet Fité, 89, Andorran businesswoman.
- Julio Casas Regueiro, 75, Cuban politician, Vice President and Defense Minister (since 2008), heart attack.
- Andrzej Maria Deskur, 87, Polish Roman Catholic cardinal, President of the Pontifical Council for Social Communications (1973–1984).
- Don Fambrough, 88, American football player and head coach (University of Kansas), injuries from a fall.
- Finn Helgesen, 92, Norwegian Olympic gold medal-winning (1948) speed skater.
- John Hoover, 91, American artist.
- Sándor Képíró, 97, Hungarian World War II veteran acquitted of Nazi war crimes.
- Sumant Misra, 88, Indian tennis player.

=== 4 ===
- Lalla Aicha, 81, Moroccan princess, first female Arab ambassador, Ambassador to United Kingdom (1965–1969); Greece (1969–1970); Italy (1970–1973).
- Hugh Fox, 79, American poet and novelist.
- Hilde Heltberg, 51, Norwegian musician, cancer.
- Dave Hoover, 56, American comic book artist (Captain America, Starman).
- Bill Kunkel, 61, American video game designer and magazine editor, heart attack.
- Mino Martinazzoli, 79, Italian politician, after long illness.
- Jag Mundhra, 62, Indian film director (Bawandar).
- Hakkı Ögelman, 71, Turkish physicist.
- Lee Roy Selmon, 56, American Hall of Fame football player (Tampa Bay Buccaneers), stroke.
- Sarah Webb, British housing executive.
- Dana Wilson, 28, New Zealand rugby league player, car accident.

=== 5 ===
- Robert Ballaman, 85, Swiss footballer, participated in 1954 World Cup.
- Reidar Børjeson, 80, Norwegian Olympic figure skater (1952).
- Andrew Zolile T. Brook, 81, South African Roman Catholic prelate, Bishop of Umtata (1979–1995).
- Angioletta Coradini, 65, Italian astrophysicist, cancer.
- Charles S. Dubin, 92, American film and television director (Hawaii Five-O, Kojak, M*A*S*H).
- Carol Frick, 78, American Olympic diver.
- Salvatore Licitra, 43, Italian tenor, injuries from a motor scooter accident.
- Vann Nath, 66, Cambodian painter.
- Bobby Rhine, 35, American soccer player (FC Dallas), heart attack.
- Peter Thuruthikonam, 82, Indian Roman Catholic prelate, Bishop of Vijayapuram (1988–2006), heart attack.

=== 6 ===
- Hans Apel, 79, German politician, Finance Minister (1974–1978) and Defence Minister (1978–1982).
- Jordan Belson, 85, American filmmaker, heart failure.
- Bruce Dan, 64, American researcher (toxic shock syndrome), complications of a bone marrow transplant.
- Dan David, 82, Romanian-born Israeli businessman and philanthropist, brain hemorrhage.
- Archduke Felix of Austria, 95, Austrian royal, last surviving child of Charles I of Austria.
- Michael S. Hart, 64, American author, inventor of the e-book and founder of Project Gutenberg, heart attack.
- George Kuchar, 69, American film director, prostate cancer.
- Little Tokyo, 70, Japanese professional wrestler, heart attack.
- Ted Longshaw, 85, British businessman and sports administrator.
- Janusz Morgenstern, 88, Polish filmmaker.
- Wardell Quezergue, 81, American music arranger, producer and bandleader, heart failure.
- Raphaël Marie Ze, 78, Cameroonian Roman Catholic prelate, Bishop of Sangmélima (1992–2008).

=== 7 ===
- Max Boisot, 67, British academic, cancer.
- Gabriel Bullet, 90, Swiss Roman Catholic prelate, Auxiliary Bishop of Lausanne, Geneva and Fribourg (1970–1993).
- Derek Grierson, 79, Scottish footballer.
- Jang Hyo-jo, 55, South Korean baseball player (Samsung Lions, Lotte Giants), liver cancer.
- Harold Mair, 92, Australian politician.
- Eddie Marshall, 73, American jazz drummer.
- Gabriel Valdés, 92, Chilean politician and diplomat, President of the Senate of Chile (1990–1996), Foreign Minister (1964–1970).
- Hiroe Yuki, 62, Japanese badminton player.
- Notable ice hockey players and coaches among the 44 killed in the Lokomotiv Yaroslavl plane crash:
  - Vitaly Anikeyenko, 24, Ukrainian defenseman (Metallurg Novokuznetsk)
  - Mikhail Balandin, 31, Russian defenseman (UHC Dynamo, HC CSKA Moscow, Mytishchi Atlant)
  - Gennady Churilov, 24, Russian centre (Lokomotiv Yaroslavl)
  - Pavol Demitra, 36, Slovak centre (St. Louis Blues, Vancouver Canucks, Minnesota Wild)
  - Robert Dietrich, 25, German defenseman (DEG Metro Stars, Milwaukee Admirals, EC Peiting)
  - Marat Kalimulin, 23, Russian defenseman (HC Lada Togliatti, Lokomotiv Yaroslavl)
  - Alexander Kalyanin, 23, Russian right wing (Lokomotiv Yaroslavl)
  - Alexander Karpovtsev, 41, Russian coach and former player (New York Rangers, Chicago Blackhawks, HC Dynamo Moscow), world champion (as player, 1993)
  - Andrei Kiryukhin, 24, Russian right wing (Lokomotiv Yaroslavl)
  - Nikita Klyukin, 21, Russian centre (Lokomotiv Yaroslavl), world U18 champion (2007)
  - Igor Korolev, 41, Russian coach and former player (Winnipeg Jets, Toronto Maple Leafs, Atlant Moscow Oblast)
  - Stefan Liv, 30, Swedish goalie (HV71, Toledo Storm, HC Sibir), Olympic gold medalist (2006), world champion (2006)
  - Jan Marek, 31, Czech centre (HC Oceláři Třinec, HC Sparta Praha, Metallurg Magnitogorsk)
  - Brad McCrimmon, 52, Canadian coach and former player (Philadelphia Flyers, Detroit Red Wings, Hartford Whalers)
  - Sergei Ostapchuk, 21, Belarusian right wing (Rouyn-Noranda Huskies, Lokomotiv Yaroslavl)
  - Karel Rachůnek, 32, Czech defenseman (Ottawa Senators, Orli Znojmo, New Jersey Devils), world champion (2010)
  - Ruslan Salei, 36, Belarusian defenseman (Colorado Avalanche, Florida Panthers, Anaheim Ducks)
  - Maxim Shuvalov, 18, Russian defenseman (Lokomotiv Yaroslavl)
  - Kārlis Skrastiņš, 37, Latvian defenseman (Nashville Predators, Dallas Stars, HK Riga 2000)
  - Pavel Snurnitsyn, 19, Russian left wing (Lokomotiv Yaroslavl)
  - Daniil Sobchenko, 20, Russian centre (Lokomotiv Yaroslavl), world junior champion (2011)
  - Ivan Tkachenko, 31, Russian left/right wing (HC Neftekhimik Nizhnekamsk, Lokomotiv Yaroslavl)
  - Pavel Trakhanov, 33, Russian defenseman (HC MVD, Severstal Cherepovets, HC CSKA Moscow)
  - Yuri Urychev, 20, Russian defenseman (Lokomotiv Yaroslavl), world junior champion (2011)
  - Josef Vašíček, 30, Czech centre (Carolina Hurricanes, New York Islanders, HC Slavia Prague), world junior champion (2000), world champion (2005)
  - Alexander Vasyunov, 23, Russian left wing (Lowell Devils, Lokomotiv Yaroslavl)
  - Alexander Vyukhin, 38, Ukrainian goalie (Sokil Kyiv, HC Sibir, Avangard Omsk)
  - Artem Yarchuk, 21, Russian left wing (Lokomotiv Yaroslavl)

=== 8 ===
- David Bitner, 62, American political leader, Chairman of the Republican Party of Florida (2011), amyotrophic lateral sclerosis.
- Mary Fickett, 83, American actress (All My Children), complications from Alzheimer's disease.
- Jesse Jefferson, 62, American baseball player (Baltimore Orioles, Toronto Blue Jays), prostate cancer.
- Usman Jibrin, 68–69, Nigerian air force officer and politician, Governor of North Central State (1975–1977).
- Keo Nakama, 91, American swimmer.
- Sir Hilary Synnott, 66, British diplomat.
- Võ Chí Công, 99, Vietnamese politician, President (1987–1992).
- Emilianos Zacharopoulos, 96, Turkish-born Greek Orthodox hierarch, Metropolitan (since 1959).

=== 9 ===
- Valentino Braitenberg, 85, Italian neuroscientist.
- Werner Geeser, 63, Swiss Olympic cross-country skier, cancer.
- Laurie Hughes, 87, English football player (Liverpool).
- Daniel Hulet, 66, Belgian cartoonist.
- William Lesick, 88, Canadian politician, MP for Edmonton East (1984–1988).
- Herbert Lomas, 87, British poet.
- Ignace Matondo Kwa Nzambi, 79, Congolese Roman Catholic prelate, Bishop of Basankusu (1974–1998) and Molegbe (1998–2007).
- Khairy Shalaby, 73, Egyptian writer.
- Peter Sneath, 87, British microbiologist.

=== 10 ===
- David E. L. Choong, 82, Malaysian badminton player.
- Graham Collier, 74, British jazz bassist.
- Bernice Lake, 78, Anguillan-born Antiguan jurist, first Eastern Caribbean woman to be appointed Queen's Counsel.
- Cecil Marshall, 71, Canadian cricketer.
- Sabino Augusto Montanaro, 89, Paraguayan politician, Minister of the Interior (1968–1989).
- Eric Prabhakar, 86, Indian Olympic athlete (1948).
- Cliff Robertson, 88, American actor (Charly, Spider-Man, PT 109, Falcon Crest ), Oscar winner (1969).
- Sam Pata Emani Tagelagi, 75, Niuean politician, first Speaker of the Niue Assembly (1976–1993), long illness.

=== 11 ===
- Douglas Allen, Baron Croham, 93, British civil servant, Head of the Home Civil Service (1974–1977).
- Art Atwood, 37, American bodybuilder, heart attack.
- Christian Bakkerud, 26, Danish racing driver, injuries sustained in a car accident.
- Lilly Bølviken, 97, Norwegian judge.
- Cliff Brittle, 69, English sports administrator, Chairman of the Rugby Football Union (1996–1998).
- Shirley Chambers, 97, American actress.
- Cláudio Deodato, 64, Brazilian Olympic footballer (1968).
- Arthur Evans, 68, American gay rights activist and author, aortic aneurysm.
- Ralph Gubbins, 79, English football player (Bolton Wanderers, Hull City, Tranmere Rovers).
- İsmet Kotak, 72, Turkish Cypriot journalist and politician, Member of Parliament, Labour Minister (1969–1976), Industry Minister (1982–1983), aortic dissection.
- Isabell Masters, 98, American politician, third-party candidate for President of the United States (1984, 1992, 1996, 2000 and 2004).
- Yuli Ofer, 87, Romanian-born Israeli businessman and entrepreneur.
- Walter C. Righter, 87, American clergyman, bishop in the Episcopal Church, after long illness.
- Andy Whitfield, 39, Welsh-born Australian actor (Spartacus: Blood and Sand), non-Hodgkin lymphoma.

=== 12 ===
- Bill Cash, 92, American Negro league baseball player.
- Frits Castricum, 64, Dutch politician, Member of the House of Representatives (1977–1994) and the Senate (1999–2003).
- Alexander Galimov, 26, Russian ice hockey player, injuries sustained in the Lokomotiv Yaroslavl plane crash.
- Mohammed Ghani Hikmat, 82, Iraqi sculptor, kidney failure.
- Peter van Huizen, 79, Malaysian Olympic field hockey player.
- Ralph Lomma, 87, American mini golf entrepreneur.
- Wade Mainer, 104, American bluegrass musician, heart failure.
- Allen Morgan, 86, American Olympic gold medal-winning (1948) coxswain, cancer.
- Petro Tronko, 96, Ukrainian academician.

=== 13 ===
- Walter Bonatti, 81, Italian mountain climber.
- John Calley, 81, American movie studio executive.
- Wilma Lee Cooper, 90, American country music singer, natural causes.
- Sam DeLuca, 75, American football player and broadcaster (New York Jets), pancreatic cancer.
- Arno Fischer, 84, German photographer.
- Paul Gallant, 67, Canadian entrepreneur, inventor of Puzz-3D, cancer.
- Jack Garner, 84, American actor (The Rockford Files, Bret Maverick, My Fellow Americans).
- Richard Hamilton, 89, British artist.
- David Jull, 66, Australian politician, Member of the House of Representatives (1975–1983, 1984–2007).
- Joe Krupa, 78, American football player (Pittsburgh Steelers), heart ailment.
- DJ Mehdi, 34, French hip hop and house producer.
- Harlan Mitchell, 87, American politician, U.S. Representative from Georgia (1958–1961).
- Carl Oglesby, 76, American anti-war activist, lung cancer.
- Gautam Rajadhyaksha, 60, Indian photographer.
- Steven Michael Woods Jr., 31, American murderer, executed by lethal injection.

=== 14 ===
- Harishchandra Birajdar, 61, Indian Olympic wrestler (1972).
- Lewis Brown, 56, American basketball player (Washington Bullets), heart attack.
- Choi Dong-won, 53, South Korean baseball player (Lotte Giants, Samsung Lions), colon cancer.
- Desmond FitzGerald, 29th Knight of Glin, 74, Irish hereditary knight.
- Jorge Lavat, 78, Mexican actor.
- Teodor Moraru, 73, Romanian painter.
- Rudolf Mössbauer, 82, German physicist, Nobel Prize laureate (1961).
- Frank Parkin, 80, British sociologist and novelist.
- Buddy Tinsley, 87, American-born Canadian football player (Winnipeg Blue Bombers).
- Malcolm Wallop, 78, American politician, United States Senator from Wyoming (1977–1995).

=== 15 ===
- Frances Bay, 92, Canadian character actress (Happy Gilmore, Blue Velvet, The Middle).
- José Manuel Rodríguez Delgado, 96, Spanish scientist and professor.
- Clemente Faccani, 90, Italian Roman Catholic prelate, Apostolic Nuncio to Kenya (1983–1995) and Seychelles (1985–1994).
- Georges Fillioud, 82, French politician.
- Dorothy Harrell, 87, American baseball player (All-American Girls Professional Baseball League).
- John Hubert Kelly, 72, American diplomat.
- Khalid Abdel Nasser, 62, Egyptian professor, eldest son of Gamal Abdel Nasser.
- Mo Rothman, 92, Canadian-born American movie executive, persuaded Charlie Chaplin to return to the United States, Parkinson's disease.
- Nicodemus Rusnak, 90, Ukrainian Orthodox hierarch, Metropolitan of Kharkiv and Bohodukhiv (since 1989).
- Regina Smendzianka, 86, Polish pianist.
- Bill Taylor, 81, American baseball player (New York Giants, Detroit Tigers).
- Otakar Vávra, 100, Czech film director, screenwriter and pedagogue.

=== 16 ===
- Ramon Amigó Anglès, 86, Spanish writer and teacher.
- Lloyd Barber, 79, Canadian university executive.
- Roger Belanger, 45, Canadian ice hockey player (Pittsburgh Penguins), heart attack.
- Sir Brian Burnett, 98, British Air Chief Marshal, Chairman of the All England Club.
- Bryce Crawford, 96, American scientist, member of the United States National Academy of Sciences.
- Jordi Dauder, 73, Spanish actor.
- Norma Eberhardt, 82, American actress (Live Fast, Die Young, The Return of Dracula), stroke.
- Dave Gavitt, 73, American basketball coach, founder of the Big East Conference.
- Sir William Hawthorne, 98, British aerospace engineer.
- Kara Kennedy, 51, American television producer, daughter of Ted Kennedy, heart attack.
- Jean Leclant, 91, French archaeologist and Egyptologist.
- Stephen Mueller, 63, American painter, cancer.
- Ted Mullighan, 72, Australian jurist, cancer.
- Willie "Big Eyes" Smith, 75, American blues musician.
- Tom Wilson, 80, American cartoonist (Ziggy).

=== 17 ===
- Roger Agache, 85, French archaeologist.
- Pedro Estay, 82, Chilean Olympic shooter.
- Robert Frascino, 59, American immunologist.
- Ernest House Sr., 65, American tribal leader, Chairman of the Ute Mountain Ute Tribe (1982–2010), injuries from a motorcycle accident.
- Colin Madigan, 90, Australian architect.
- Faidon Matthaiou, 87, Greek basketball player and coach.
- George MacDonald Sacko, 75, Liberian footballer.
- Eleanor Mondale, 51, American television personality, brain cancer.
- Charles H. Percy, 91, American politician, Senator from Illinois (1967–1985), Alzheimer's disease.
- Kurt Sanderling, 98, German conductor.
- Ferenc Szojka, 80, Hungarian footballer.
- Moisés Villanueva de la Luz, 47, Mexican politician, MP (2011). (body found on this date)
- Peter Wright, 82, British police officer.
- Tomasz Zygadło, 63, Polish film director.

=== 18 ===
- Jack Adler, 94, American comic book artist (Sea Devils, Green Lantern, Batman).
- Paul Bach, 72, English journalist and editor (Saga Magazine).
- Mohammed Bassiouni, 74, Egyptian diplomat, Ambassador to Israel (1986–2000).
- Tom Daly, 93, Canadian movie director and producer, long illness.
- Norma Holloway Johnson, 79, American federal judge, first African American woman to serve as a district court chief judge, stroke.
- Bayless Manning, 88, American lawyer, Dean of Stanford Law School (1964–1971), first President of the Council on Foreign Relations.
- William F. May, 95, American film society founder (Film Society of Lincoln Center), heart failure.
- Marcelino Palentini, 68, Italian-born Argentinian Roman Catholic prelate, Bishop of Jujuy (since 1995).
- Aleksandr Potapov, 67, Soviet Olympic sailor.
- Jamey Rodemeyer, 14, American gay activist and bullying victim, suicide by hanging.
- Kurt Sanderling, 98, German conductor.
- Ivo Škrabalo, 77, Croatian writer, director and actor.
- Imre Varga, 66, Hungarian Olympic judoka.
- Swian Zanoni, 23, Brazilian motocross rider, race accident.

=== 19 ===
- George Benton, 78, American boxer, pneumonia.
- Thomas Capano, 61, American convicted murderer, heart attack.
- Jo Carson, 64, American writer.
- Bernard Collomb, 80, French racing driver.
- Dolores Hope, 102, American philanthropist, widow of Bob Hope, natural causes.
- Little Yellow Jacket, 15, American bucking bull.
- Ginger McCain, 80, British horse trainer, cancer.
- George Cadle Price, 92, Belizean politician, Prime Minister (1981–1984; 1989–1993).
- Johnny Răducanu, 79, Romanian jazz musician, cardiac arrest.
- Mathieu Schiller, 32, French bodybuilder, shark attack.

=== 20 ===
- Arvid Andersson, 92, Swedish Olympic weightlifter.
- Johnny Barend, 82, American professional wrestler, natural causes.
- Frank Driggs, 81, American Grammy Award-winning jazz producer, musician and archivist, natural causes.
- Oscar Handlin, 95, American historian.
- Michael Jarvis, 73, British horse trainer.
- Aleksei Mamykin, 75, Russian footballer and coach.
- Burhanuddin Rabbani, 70, Afghan politician, President (1992–1996, 2001), bomb attack.
- Claude Rohla, 59, Luxembourgish Olympic archer.
- Victor Blanchard Scheffer, 104, American mammalogist and author, natural causes.
- Gaby Stenberg, 88, Swedish actress.
- Per Unckel, 63, Swedish politician, Governor of Stockholm County (since 2007), cancer.
- Urpo Vähäranta, 85, Finnish Olympic athlete.
- Arch West, 97, American marketing executive credited with developing Doritos.
- Robert Whitaker, 71, British photographer, shot The Beatles' butcher album cover, cancer.

=== 21 ===
- Joe Abeywickrama, 84, Sri Lankan actor.
- Lawrence Russell Brewer, 44, American convicted murderer, executed by lethal injection.
- Troy Davis, 42, American convicted murderer, executed by lethal injection.
- Michael Julian Drake, 65, American planetary scientist.
- John Du Cann, 66, British musician (Atomic Rooster), heart attack.
- Paulette Dubost, 100, French actress (The Rules of the Game, The Last Metro).
- Ben Feleo, 85, Filipino film director.
- Mickey Rottner, 92, American basketball player (Sheboygan Red Skins, Chicago Stags).
- Pamela Ann Rymer, 70, American federal judge, cancer.
- Naoki Sugiura, 79, Japanese actor, lung cancer.

=== 22 ===
- Mansoor Ali Khan Pataudi, 70, Indian cricketer, ninth and last Nawab of Pataudi (1952–1971), lung disease.
- Peter E. Berger, 67, American film editor (Fatal Attraction, Star Trek, Alvin and the Chipmunks), leukemia.
- Jonathan Cecil, 72, English actor.
- Cengiz Dağcı, 92, Turkish language Crimean novelist and poet.
- John H. Dick, 92, American naval officer and college basketball player.
- Henry Lacey, 91, S African cricketer.
- Robert Mistele, 91, American football coach.
- Margaret Ogola, 53, Kenyan author.
- Asbjørn Osnes, 79, Norwegian Olympic ski jumper.
- Whatumoana Paki, 85, New Zealand Māori royal elder, widower of Te Atairangikaahu, father of King Tuheitia.
- Aristides Pereira, 87, Cape Verdean politician and guerrilla leader, President (1975–1991).
- Vic Roby, 93, American radio and television announcer.
- Knut Steen, 86, Norwegian sculptor.
- Vesta Williams, 53, American R&B singer, hypertensive heart disease.

=== 23 ===
- Orlando Brown Sr., 40, American football player (Cleveland Browns, Baltimore Ravens), diabetic ketoacidosis.
- Hubert Constant, 80, Haitian Roman Catholic prelate, Archbishop of Cap-Haïtien (2003–2008).
- Luciano Galbo, 68, Italian cyclist.
- Danny Litwhiler, 95, American baseball player and coach.
- Guy Marcoux, 87, Canadian politician.
- Rolland W. Redlin, 91, American politician, U.S. Representative from North Dakota (1965–1967).
- Douglas Stuart, 20th Earl of Moray, 83, British aristocrat.
- Joseph Trịnh Chính Trực, 85, Vietnamese Roman Catholic prelate, Bishop of Ban Me Thuot (1990–2000).
- José Miguel Varas, 83, Chilean writer.
- Carl Wood, 81, Australian in vitro fertilisation pioneer, Alzheimer's disease.

=== 24 ===
- Robert Chasowa, 25, Malawian political activist.
- Surinder Kapoor, 86, Indian film producer, cardiac arrest.
- Tony Knap, 96, American college football coach, Alzheimer's disease.
- Konstantin Lerner, 61, Ukrainian chess grandmaster.
- Emanuel Litvinoff, 96, British writer and human rights campaigner.
- George Palliser, 92, British World War II fighter pilot.
- Gusty Spence, 78, British Ulster loyalist, leader of the Ulster Volunteer Force.
- Ken Yamauchi, 67, Japanese actor, pneumonia.

=== 25 ===
- Len Allmond, 86, Australian rugby league footballer.
- Theyab Awana, 21, Emirati footballer, traffic accident.
- Denis Cannan, 92, British playwright.
- Tony Conyers, 83, British journalist.
- Erling Lars Dale, 65, Norwegian educationalist, cancer.
- Norman Lawson, 75, English footballer and cricketer.
- Sissy Löwinger, 70, Austrian actress, daughter of Paul Löwinger.
- Wangari Maathai, 71, Kenyan environmental activist, MP and Nobel Peace Prize winner, cancer.
- Helen Reichert, 109, American talk show personality and New York University professor.
- Ali St. Louis, 52, Trinidadian Olympic athlete, traffic accident.

=== 26 ===
- Sharon Anderson-Gold, 63, American professor, cancer.
- Robert Blinc, 76, Slovene physicist.
- Sergio Bonelli, 78, Italian comic book author and publisher.
- Bob Cassilly, 61, American sculptor, founder of City Museum, bulldozer accident.
- Jessy Dixon, 73, American gospel musician.
- David Zelag Goodman, 81, American screenwriter (Straw Dogs, Logan's Run, Lovers and Other Strangers), progressive supranuclear palsy.
- Jerry Haynes, 84, American actor (RoboCop, Places in the Heart, Heartbreak Hotel), Parkinson's disease.
- Harry Muskee, 70, Dutch blues singer and musician (Cuby + Blizzards), cancer.
- Uan Rasey, 90, American trumpeter, heart ailment.
- Michael Schor, 91, Israeli security official, CEO of Israel Military Industries (1972–1989).
- Ron Toomer, 81, American roller coaster designer.

=== 27 ===
- Mahmoud Abouelleil, 75-76, Egyptian politician.
- Fernando Agüero, 94, Nicaraguan politician.
- David Croft, 89, British television comedy writer and producer (Are You Being Served?, Dad's Army).
- Sara Douglass, 54, Australian fantasy author, ovarian cancer.
- Ida Fink, 89, Israeli Polish-language author.
- Wilson Greatbatch, 92, American engineer, inventor of the implantable cardiac pacemaker.
- Dave Hill, 74, American golfer, complications from emphysema.
- Imre Makovecz, 75, Hungarian architect.
- Richard W. Mallary, 82, American politician, U.S. Representative from Vermont (1972–1975).
- "Country" Johnny Mathis, 80, American country music singer-songwriter.
- Chus Pereda, 73, Spanish football player and manager.
- Stuart Spencer, 79, Australian footballer.
- Joe Tofflemire, 46, American football player (Seattle Seahawks), heart failure.
- Erik Wedersøe, 73, Danish actor.
- Johnnie Wright, 97, American country music singer (Johnnie & Jack), husband of Kitty Wells.
- Cizia Zykë, 61, French writer and adventurer.

=== 28 ===
- James E. Bowman, 88, American physician.
- Patrick Collinson, 82, British historian.
- Pierre Dansereau, 99, Canadian ecologist.
- Charles J. Donlan, 95, American NASA researcher and manager.
- Heidi, 3, American-born cross-eyed opossum at Leipzig Zoo, euthanised.
- Chingis Izmailov, 67, Russian psychophysiologist.
- Claude R. Kirk Jr., 85, American politician, Governor of Florida (1967–1971).
- Nick Navarro, 81, American law enforcement official, Sheriff of Broward County, Florida (1985–1992), complications of cancer.
- Alfredo Pieroni, 88, Italian journalist.

=== 29 ===
- Eddie Bockman, 91, American baseball player, manager and scout (Pittsburgh Pirates, New York Yankees).
- Charles Brooks, 90, American editorial cartoonist.
- Len Castle, 86, New Zealand potter.
- Hella Haasse, 93, Dutch writer.
- Philip Hannan, 98, American Roman Catholic prelate, Archbishop of New Orleans (1965–1988).
- Nonie Lynch, 101, Irish traditional singer.
- Tatyana Lioznova, 87, Russian film director (Seventeen Moments of Spring), People's Artist of the USSR.
- Vera Popkova, 68, Russian athlete, Olympic bronze medalist (1968).
- Sylvia Robinson, 76, American singer (Mickey & Sylvia), music producer and record label executive, heart failure.
- Lojze Slak, 79, Slovene accordion player, bone cancer.
- Iain Sproat, 72, Scottish politician and journalist.

=== 30 ===
- Va'aelua Eti Alesana, Samoan politician, President of the Tautua Samoa Party (since 2011).
- João d'Avila Moreira Lima, 92, Brazilian Roman Catholic prelate, Auxiliary Bishop of São Sebastião do Rio de Janeiro (1982–2002).
- Anwar al-Awlaki, 40, American-born Yemeni cleric and Al-Qaeda official, airstrike.
- Pilar Barril, 79, Spanish tennis player.
- Lee Davenport, 95, American physicist, helped develop SCR-584 radar, cancer.
- Gilberto Fernandez, 76, Cuban-born American Roman Catholic prelate, Auxiliary Bishop of Miami (1997–2002).
- Mykhaylo Forkash, 63, Ukrainian footballer.
- Peter Gent, 69, American football player (Dallas Cowboys) and author (North Dallas Forty).
- Alexander Grant, 86, New Zealand ballet dancer.
- Mike Heimerdinger, 58, American football coach (Tennessee Titans), cancer.
- Gaspar Henaine, 84, Mexican comedian.
- Mumtaz Jajja, 63, Pakistani politician, dengue fever.
- Roger G. Kennedy, 85, American civil servant, Director of the National Park Service (1993–1997), melanoma.
- Samir Khan, 25, Saudi-born American jihadist and publisher (Inspire), airstrike.
- Ram Dayal Munda, 72, Indian scholar and activist.
- Sir Arthur Norman, 94, British industrialist.
- Clifford Olson, 71, Canadian serial killer, cancer.
- Ralph M. Steinman, 68, Canadian immunologist, announced as 2011 Nobel Laureate in Medicine, pancreatic cancer.
- Marv Tarplin, 70, American guitarist (The Miracles) and songwriter.
