= 2026 in Moldova =

- Decades: 2000s; 2010s; 2020s
- See also: Other events of 2026; Timeline of Moldovan history

Events from the year 2026 in Moldova.

== Incumbents ==
Photo	Post	Name
	President of Moldova	Maia Sandu
	Prime Minister of Moldova	Alexandru Munteanu (until 3 July)
	Prime Minister of Moldova	Eugen Osmochescu (acting, until 22 July)
	Prime Minister of Moldova	Vasile Tofan (since 22 July)
	President of the Parliament	Igor Grosu

== Events ==
=== January ===
- 17 January – A crashed drone believed to have originated from Russia is discovered in Nucăreni, Telenești District.
- 31 January – A technical malfunction affecting power lines running between Ukraine, Romania and Moldova causes extensive power outages in parts of Moldova, including Chişinău.

=== February ===
- 6 February – A crashed drone believed to have originated from Russia is discovered in Sofia, Drochia District.

=== March ===
- 3 March – Ludmila Vartic dies by suicde after jumping from an apartment block in Chișinău. Her death receives press attention and triggers protests after family members allege that her husband, Party of Action and Solidarity local politician Dumitru Vartic, had subjected her to years of domestic abuse.
- 15 March – The government declares a 15-day environmental alert in the Dniester River basin after a Russian attack on the Dniester Hydroelectric Station in neighboring Ukraine leads to an oil leakage that threatens water supplies.

=== April ===
- 8 April – President Sandu signs a law withdrawing the country from the Commonwealth of Independent States.
- 22 April – Oligarch Vladimir Plahotniuc is sentenced to 19 years' imprisonment for embezzlement.
- 28 April – Two Moldovan nationals held by Belarus are released at the border with Poland following a prisoner exchange facilitated by the United States.

=== May ===
- 15 May – Russia issues a law easing citizenship requirements for citizens of Transnistria.

=== July ===
- 3 July – Alexandru Munteanu resigns as prime minister.
- 8 July – Eugen Osmochescu is appointed as acting prime minister.
- 22 July – Vasile Tofan is elected as prime minister by parliament.

=== September ===
- 18 September – Russia opens polling stations in Transnistria for the 2026 Russian legislative election.

=== November ===
- 15 November – 2026 Gagauz general election (first round): No candidate wins a majority for the governorship of Gagauzia, with Fiodor Gagauz and Alexandr Stoianoglo advancing to a runoff.

=== Scheduled ===
- 29 November – 2026 Gagauz general election (second round)

== Holidays ==
- 1–2 January – New Year's Day
- 7–8 January – Orthodox Christmas Day
- 8 March – International Women's Day
- 12 April – Orthodox Easter Sunday
- 13 April – Orthodox Easter
- 20 April – Easter of Blajini
- 1 May – Labour Day
- 9 May – Victory Day
- 1 June – Children's Day
- 27 August – Independence Day
- 31 August – Romanian Language Day
- 25 December – Catholic Christmas

== Deaths ==
- 26 January – Alexei Simașchevici, 96, physicist, member of the Academy of Sciences of Moldova.
- 24 February – Nicolae Andronati, 90, politician, first deputy prime minister (1992–1994).
- 31 March – Nicolae Proca, 77, politician, deputy (1990–1994).
- 4 May – Ion Toderaș, 77, ecologist and biologist, member of the Academy of Sciences of Moldova.
- 4 November – Vadim Crîcimari, 38, footballer (CSCA–Rapid Chișinău, Speranța Crihana Veche, Dacia Buiucani).

== See also ==
- 2026 in Europe
