= Scrabble variants =

Games based on Scrabble

Scrabble variants are games created by changing the normal Scrabble rules or equipment.

== Variants with standard board and/or tiles ==
=== Anagrab ===
Anagrab is a word game which is usually played with Scrabble tiles. The name is an amalgam of the words anagram (the basic game mechanism) and grab - because a player's words may at any time be taken by opponents. The game was first described in 1976 in Richard Sharp's The Best Games People Play, but his description suggests that he did not invent it.

==== Gameplay ====
Letter tiles are placed face down and turned over one at a time. At any point (there are no turns) any player may call out a word of at least four letters. This word can be made either entirely from the pool of letters, or by adding at least one new letter to an existing word. If the new word is acceptable the person who said the word first takes the letters and places them as a word in front of them. When making a new word the root of the existing word must be changed - for example D could not be added to the word LIVE to make LIVED, but it could make DEVIL. All the letters in an existing word must be included in the new one, plus at least one more.

When a new letter is turned over, the first person to say a valid word takes it. If more than one is said at the same time the longer word takes it. If the two are the same length (or the same word) then those words are banned for the rest of the game and nobody takes it.

==== Scoring ====
Sharp suggests that the score for each word is the face value of the tiles multiplied by the number of letters in that word. In practice any reasonable system, such as totaling the number of letters held, is acceptable.

=== Anagrams ===
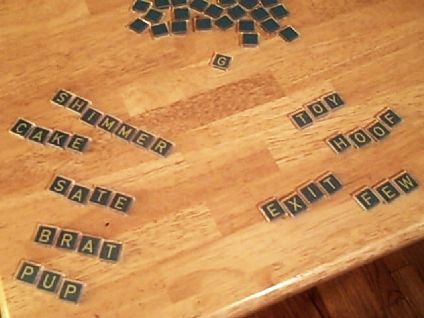
A game of Snatch in progress

Anagrams (also called Snatch or Snatch-words) is a fast-paced, non-turn-based Scrabble variant played without a board. The tiles are placed face-down in the middle of the table, and players take turns flipping a single tile, leaving it in clear view of all players. Otherwise the game is not turn-based, and the rules are very simple: any player who sees a Scrabble-valid word can call it out, take the letters, and lay the word out in front of herself. At the end of the game each player's collection of individual words is scored.

To create the words, players can:

- take whole words (of 3 or more letters) from the communal pool of exposed, unused letters;
- add letters to an existing word on the table—whether their own or any opponent's. (Therefore, even if a player has found a word and placed it in front of herself, it can be stolen at any time if someone can combine its tiles with any loose tiles to make a new valid word. For example, if Sally already has SATE in front of her and a G comes up in the pool, any player can steal it by calling out "GATES". Sally can prevent the theft by calling out the word herself.);
- take multiple words from the table and combine them with a letter (or letters) from the pool to create a new word. For example, a player may combine FEW, SATE and the G to steal WEFTAGES. Some versions forbid combining existing words without adding at least one extra letter.

A version of the game seems to be popular among tournament Scrabble players. Writers John Ciardi, James Merrill, John Malcolm Brinnin, and Richard Wilbur reputedly played together regularly in Key West, Florida, with novelist John Hersey also sometimes sitting in.

=== Clabbers ===
An example board from a game of Clabbers

Clabbers is the best known variant to tournament Scrabble players. All of the rules are identical to Scrabble with one exception: words played only have to be anagrams of real words. For example, MPORCTEU is a valid play in Clabbers because it is an anagram of COMPUTER. The increased ability to play parallel to pre-existing words makes for much higher scores.

A variant of this is Multi-Anagram Clabbers, in which players receive the basic score for any set of letters played multiplied by the number of valid anagrams for that set of letters. Opponents may "steal" points, once the initial player has declared their turn complete, by announcing other anagrams that the first player neglected to mention. In finding such anagrams, the blank must be declared as only one letter and may not change. For example, with a rack of AEILNS? (? = blank), a player announcing that the blank was a C and announcing the words SANICLE and INLACES would receive twice the base score; their opponent could steal the word SCALENI and score the base amount, but could not change the C to a T and earn points for SALTINE.

=== Duplicate ===
Duplicate Scrabble is a form of organized tournament Scrabble popular in French-speaking countries, in which in each round all players receive the same tiles and, within a fixed time limit, have to find the highest scoring word. Players only receive points for their own words, and at the end, when there are no more consonants or no more vowels, the player with the most points wins the game. This form of Scrabble can often result in many players participating simultaneously; the official record for participation in France, where Duplicate Scrabble is the preferred form of the game, is 1485 at the 1998 tournament in Vichy. It is also the predominant format used in the French World Scrabble Championships.

=== Ecological Scrabble ===
The name of this variant stems from the fact that the blank tiles can be recycled. If a blank is played, any player may remove it from the board at the start of their turn and replace it with the letter it was declared to represent. For example, if PEAk is played (with a blank K), a player may take the blank and lay an actual K in its place. However, they may not replace it with any other letter that would form a valid word, such as L (PEAL), R (PEAR), S (PEAS), or T (PEAT).

=== Solitaire Scrabble ===
Solitaire Scrabble follows the same rules and word acceptability as normal Scrabble, but there is only one player. Solitaire Scrabble can be played against a clock, trying to get the most points in a certain length of time or for highest maximum score.

=== Tag Team ===
This variant is played with two teams of two players each, with each player possessing his/her own rack. On each team's turn, one of the players makes a play, followed immediately by a play by the teammate. Set-ups are quite common; a team set up a 302-point triple-triple MENAZo(N)S at the 2010 National Scrabble Championship's Tag Team Tournament.

=== Take Two ===
Take Two (also called Speed Scrabble and similar to Bananagrams) is a fast-paced, non-turn-based Scrabble variant played without a board. Tiles are placed face-down in the middle of the table in a communal pool and each player is given a small number of face-up starting tiles. From their starting tiles, each player tries to build his own valid Scrabble grid—players do not use each other's grid or tiles. When a player successfully uses all of his face-up tiles, he shouts "take two", and every player takes two more tiles. Play continues until there are no more tiles left to draw. In some variants, the person who creates the first complete grid when all the tiles run out is the winner. In others, a calculation based on word length is used to determine the winner.

Some variants allow for the exchange of unwanted tiles. Local variants include Take One or Take Four; the banning of 2 letter words; having a dictionary on hand for any players to use (but since it is a game of speed, this doesn't get used much); a bonus of 50 points for building a specific word, a bonus for longest word (number of letters in word, not tile values; and only if a single player has longest word), etc.

=== Team Speed Scrabble ===
Team Speed Scrabble is when teams of 2, 3, or 4 race to play legal Scrabble words as quickly as possible. Scoring does not matter; all that matters is how quickly words are played. This can be a co-operative game where all players are simply trying to complete the game as fast as possible.

== Variants with non-standard equipment ==
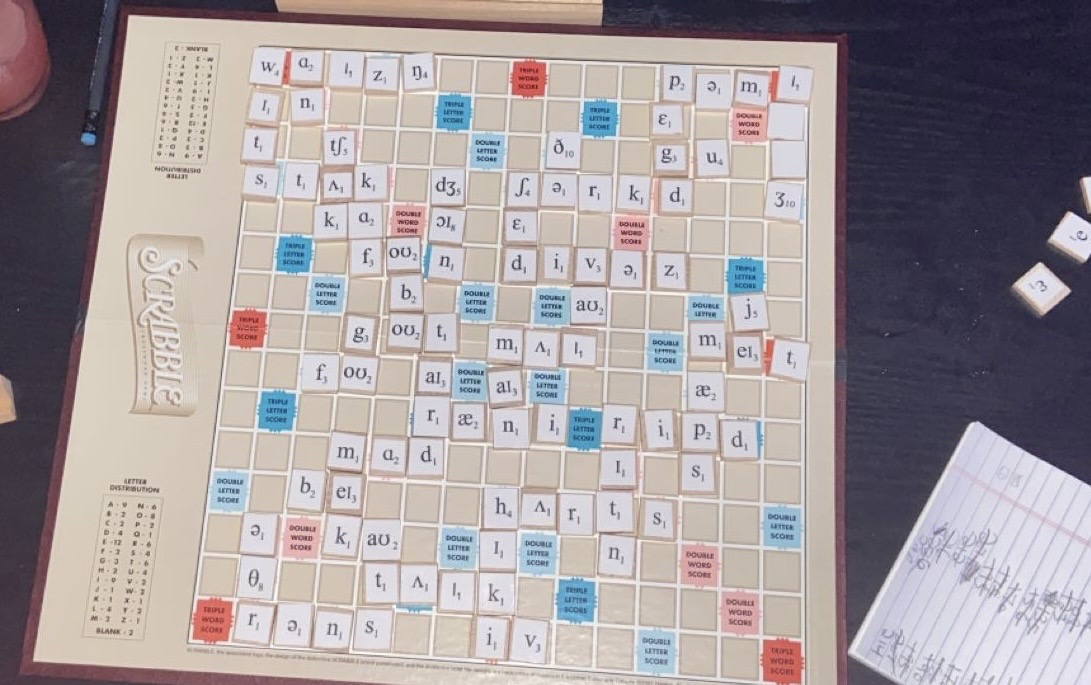
IPA Scrabble

=== Super Scrabble ===
This game has the same rules and tiles as Scrabble, but the board is larger (21x21 vs. 15x15 in the original). With the larger board there are more premium squares, going up to quadruple letter and quadruple word scores. There are also twice as many tiles with a slightly different distribution, such as two S's added when compared to the original distribution doubled.*

=== Scrabble Slam! ===
This game uses cards for tiles where players throw down a card with a letter to change a four-letter word to another four-letter word by placing the card on top of one of the four piles of cards that form the word. So if the word shown is LACE, one player can put the M on the L to make it MACE and the next player could put a Z on the C to make the word MAZE and so on. Scoring is based on how many words are formed. This variation is also used on Scrabble Showdown.

=== Scrabble Trickster ===
A variant of Scrabble introduced by Mattel on April 6, 2010, Scrabble Trickster has spaces on the board which let players draw cards, which let the players take certain actions not allowed in traditional Scrabble.

=== WildWords ===
This game has the same size board and nearly the same scoring system as Scrabble. The major differences are the inclusion of twelve wild tiles marked with an asterisk that may represent one letter or any series of letters and special board squares that convert a regular letter tile into a wild tile (the tile in question is placed upside down on such a square). The nature of these changes shifts the emphasis of the game from playing short words to playing words of any length. For example, QUA*IST, could be the word QUARTERFINALIST. Good players must find 7-tile bonus plays a majority of the time, and the short odd words that are a staple in Scrabble are of little use in WildWords.

=== Scarabeo ===
Scarabeo is an Italian variant of Scrabble that is much more popular in its native country than the original game. It features a 17×17 board, 8 tiles per rack instead of 7, and a 30-point bonus for using 7 tiles as well as the 50-point "bingo". Instead of blank tiles, the tiles which can be used as any letter have scarabs on them, hence the name.

=== Scrabble Junior ===
Scrabble Junior child-friendly version of Scrabble can pretty much grow with the age of the child. The double-sided game board incorporates a variant for children five to seven years of age on one side and a version for older children aged seven to ten on the other. Two to four players can take part in a game. In the simpler version, young players connect letters with words on the game board. The words have been preprinted on the playing field and only have to be covered by the letter tiles until a complete word has been constructed. If the board is flipped, words must be constructed independently, as they are in regular Scrabble.

=== Wordox ===
This game is a cross between Othello and Scrabble played on a 13 x13 board. Each player has different coloured tiles. The rack is common and always contains 7 tiles. All tiles have the same value, one point. Points are scored for how many tiles are currently your own colour. The special squares are pink and orange. A word with a tile on a pink square clears the board. When this happens a bonus point is received for each tile you placed on an orange square on that board.

=== Literaxx ===
The Literaxx board

Literaxx is the English version of Literaki, a popular online Polish variant. Tiles are worth 1, 2, 3 or 5 points and are coloured according to their value. Double and triple word squares function in the same manner as standard Scrabble. However, the coloured triple letter squares are only active when the tile colour matches that of the square.

Literaxx is available at PlayOK.

=== Anadrome ===
Anadrome is a web-based variant which (as the name implies) allows words to be played reading in any orthogonal direction, doubling traditional turn opportunities. With 39 different bonus tiles, many directly correlating to mathematical operators like * (multiplication), ^ (exponentiation), ! (factorial), ⌈ (ceiling and floor), and Π (product series) across over 500 boards, scores may require scientific notation, depending on the board. Points are calculated automatically and displayed next to definitions of words as they are placed. Anadrome has a tile-earning mechanic and board editor, allowing users to create publicly available boards for Scrabble, Words with Friends, and their own custom designs, making it a superset of crossword-style games.

=== Phrazzle Me ===
Phrazzle Me plays similarly to Scrabble, but uses whole words instead of just letters. Players can make full sentences and add to them for points. Up to 7 people can play at a time. It has been described as "The evolution of Scrabble."

== Scrabble Showdown ==
On the game show Scrabble Showdown, two teams play various games in order to win prizes including a vacation to anywhere in the world.

== Number game variants ==
=== Equate ===
In Equate, players score by forming equations on a 19x19 board. There are three sets of tiles that can be played with, the Original Tile Set includes whole numbers, fractions and four basic operations; the Junior Tile Set includes whole numbers with more 0s and 1s than the Original Tile Set, fractions with denominator 2, and the four basic operations with more addition and subtraction tiles than multiplication and division tiles, and finally the Advanced Tile Set includes negative and positive integers, integer exponents, fractions and the four basic operations. In all three sets there are equal symbols.

=== Gosum, or Equable ===
Gosum is similar to Numble. Users place sequences of numbers and equations, using the four main arithmetic operators (addition, subtraction, division, multiplication) and the equal sign in a Scrabble-like placement.

A similar Scrabble-like arithmetic game was published in Australia, during the 1970s, under the name Equable. Number tiles were white, arithmetic operations and symbol tiles (including decimal point, fraction-dashes, and percentage) were grey, and players could freely take special equal-sign tiles when they made their move. Clearly the name was meant to evoke the conceptual link with Scrabble. The game-board also had bonus-squares.

=== King's Cribbage ===
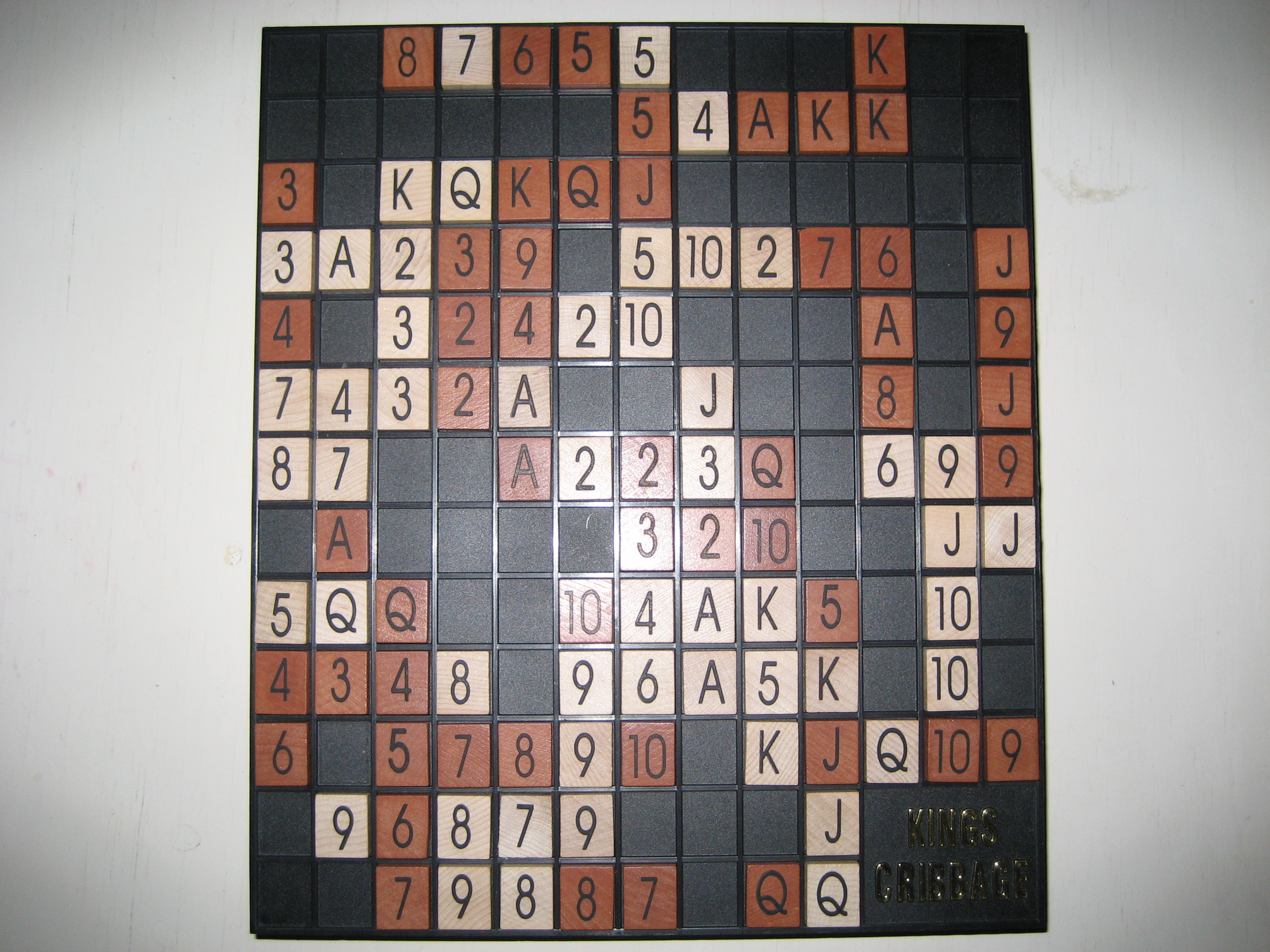
A completed game of Kings Cribbage

In CoCoCo Games' Kings Cribbage, players score by placing valid cribbage scoring combinations from a hand of five tiles marked with playing card values. David Bukszpan, in his 2012 book Is that a Word?, panned the game, saying it was "not terribly easy to pick up, and seems destined to remain forever abandoned and gathering dust in the great toy attic of history." Despite this assessment, the game did gain some measure of popularity in the UK, resulting in tournaments. The game reviewer for SaskToday expected the game would bog down and eventually end prematurely due to non-scoring hands, but was pleasantly surprised that this was not the case, and stated "This is a game every cribbage player needs to own, and I suspect Scrabble players will appreciate it too."

=== Mixmath ===
Mixmath, a game developed by Wrebbit, also involves placing correct mathematical equations on a board with bonus squares similar to a Scrabble board.

=== Numble ===
One of the earlier number-based variants, Numble was a physical board game using numbers and basic mathematic equations (addition, subtraction, multiplication, division). Players form valid equations.

=== Triolet ===
Triolet uses pairs or triplets of numbers that sum up to less than, or exactly 15, respectively. The placement of the pairs or triplets is similar to Scrabble. Triolet means "triplet" in French.

=== Yushino ===
Yushino uses number sequences where every number is the last digit of the sum of the previous two. For two number sequences it requires that the numbers are adjacent.

== Related games ==
=== Bananagrams ===
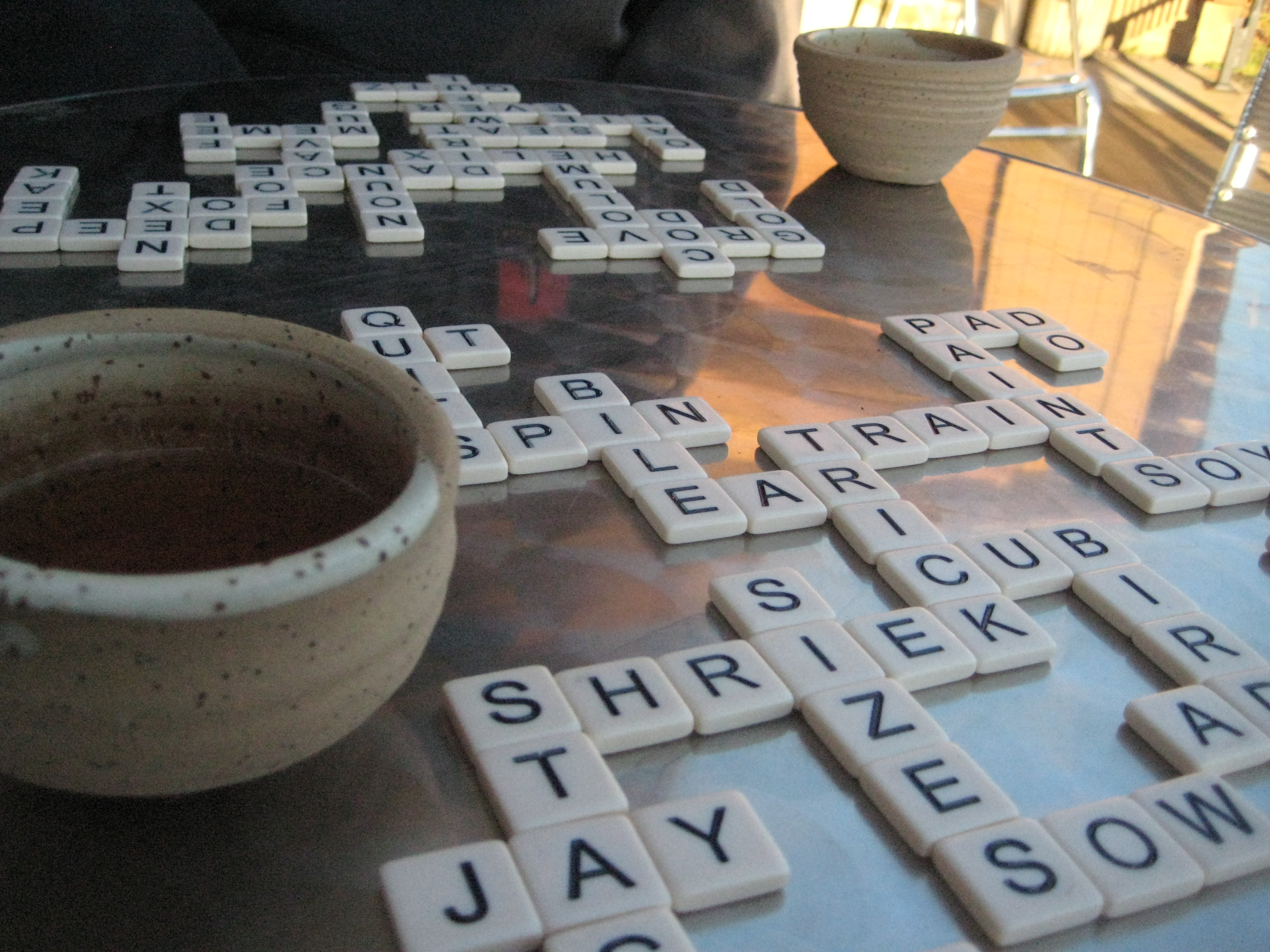
A game of Bananagrams in progress

Bananagrams is a commercial version of the variant Take Two. Players draw tiles and assemble separate arrangements of words without a board.

=== UpWords ===
Scrabble Upwords (originally just named UpWords) is played with 100 letter tiles on a special 10×10 board with no premium squares (originally 64 tiles on an 8×8 board). It has a Qu tile instead of Q and a different tile distribution than Scrabble. Words can be formed as in Scrabble as well as by playing on top of previously formed words. When playing over a word, at least one tile from the original word must be incorporated into the new word. All tiles, with the exception of the Qu tile in certain circumstances, are worth the same, with additional points scored for higher stacks of letters. Stacks can't go higher than five tiles and all words that are completely on the first level receive doubled points.
