= Mixmath =

Canadian board game

mi×ma+h (or Mixmath) is a Canadian board game developed by Wrebbit and published in 1987. It resembles a variant of Scrabble in that tiles are placed on a crossword-style grid, with special premiums such as squares that double or triple the value of a tile and a 50-point bonus for playing all seven tiles on the player's rack in one turn. Unlike Scrabble, Mixmath uses numbered tiles to generate short equations using simple arithmetic. Wrebbit, maker of Puzz-3D jigsaw puzzles, has since been taken over by Hasbro, and it appears that Mixmath has been discontinued.

== Gameplay ==
Mixmath is designed for 2 to 4 players in games lasting roughly 60 minutes. Players should be comfortable with the basic operations of addition, subtraction, multiplication, and division.

=== Contents ===
The gameboard is a 14x14 grid. The central four squares are orange and contain the numbers 1 (upper left), 2 (upper right), 3 (lower left), and 4 (lower right)- these squares cannot have tiles played upon them, and are the basis for beginning the game. There are special blue squares scattered throughout the board which contain an arithmetic symbol (a plus, minus, multiplication, or division sign), as well as premium squares labelled as 2x (green) and 3x (red).

There are 108 tiles included with the game, 2 of which are blank and can be used as replacements. Of the 106 playable tiles, there are seven each of the numbers 1 through 10, one 0, one each of the numbers 11 through 20, and one each of every number between 20 and 99 that can be represented as a multiplication of two numbers between 1 and 10 (for example, 21, 24, 25).

There are also four racks that can fit seven tiles, and a pouch from which to draw tiles.

=== Starting the game ===
After all the tiles are placed in the pouch, each player draws a single tile. The player with the highest number goes first. Each player places their drawn tile on their rack, and draws six more, for a total of seven.

The first move by the first player must use two of the four initial numbers on the board (1, 2, 3, and 4) to form a simple mathematical equation (such as 1 + 2 = 3, so that the player places a tile numbered "3" to the right of the "1" and "2" squares). Play then continues, as described below. If the first player has no legal moves (such as having only two-digit numbers on the rack), he or she may exchange tiles or pass, and play moves to the left.

=== Playing tiles ===
Each played tile is the solution to an arithmetic equation containing two adjacent tiles, such that a line of three numbers is formed. For example, a sequence of an 8 and a 2 on the board may have either a 4 (division), 6 (subtraction), 10 (addition), or 16 (multiplication) played next to it. The position of the played tile may be either to the right or left of the adjacent tiles for a horizontally-oriented equation (representing either 10 = 8 + 2 or 8 + 2 = 10), or either above or below the tiles for a vertical orientation.

Each time a player places a tile, the move is considered final and irreversible. Other players may challenge the move if the tile is not a solution using proper arithmetic. If the player is found to be at fault, he or she must withdraw the tile and end the turn, collecting only the points made from previous moves in that turn.

The player can continue to play tiles on a single turn so long as there are legal moves. Additional plays do not need to use tiles played earlier in the turn, but it may be useful to "build" equations so that difficult high-value tiles can be played. Once a player no longer has legal moves, has played all of the tiles on the rack, or chooses to stop, the turn is finished, the player's score is recorded, and the player draws new tiles from the pouch until the rack has seven tiles again.

=== Special squares ===
- Sign squares are blue and contain an arithmetic symbol. Any tile placed in that square must be a solution of an equation using that symbol (for example, if the square contains a "+" and an 8 and a 2 beside it, only a 10 may be played in the blue square). Once a tile is placed on that square, the player has the option of immediately drawing a tile from the rack as a bonus. The player cannot "take back" their decision if they discover that the newly drawn tile is not favourable.
- Premium squares are red and green. When a tile is played on the square, its value is multiplied by the value indicated (either "2×" or "3×").

=== Scoring ===
Score is taken at the end of each player's turn. The sum of the values of the tiles played in the turn is the score for the turn. The value of the tile is most often the face value (such as the 10 tile being worth 10 points), but the value can be modified via multiplication through premium squares or by using it for multiple equations in a single placement: if, when a tile is placed, it is a correct solution for more than one set of adjacent tiles (such as 6 + 4 = 10 = 8 + 2, where the "10" was the only tile added), its value is multiplied by the number of correct solutions formed (up to 4 directions). Multiple directions and premium square bonuses are multiplied together, when applicable. In addition, if the player began a turn with seven tiles on the rack and proceeded to clear the rack in a single turn (either through seven plays, or by additionally drawing tiles via sign squares and eventually playing them), a bonus of 50 points is added to the score.

At the end of the game, once all tiles from the pouch and a player has played all his or her remaining tiles (or all players pass in consecutive turns), the final score is tallied. If tiles remain on a player's rack, the value of the tiles is subtracted from their score (but not added to any other player's score). The player with the highest total at the end of the game is declared the winner.

Scores between skilled players often exceeds 2000 points combined.

== Strategy ==
- Playing first is not always advantageous. Unlike Scrabble, there are no multiplying bonuses for playing first, and it is extremely difficult to reach any premium squares. In addition, only low-value tiles can be legally played in the first few moves (the highest possible opening tile is only a 12), which do not collect many points. Unless several tiles can be played, it may be desirable to pass on the first turn or exchange tiles, especially in two-player games.
- Build up the equations for high tiles (such as 81 or 90) using the tiles on the rack (such as 9 × 9 = 81, where the player holds the 81 and one or both of the 9s). An experienced opponent will not open up places to play high-value tiles, so these places must be built during the consecutive moves in a player's turn.
- The 0 (zero) tile is particularly difficult to get rid of, because it requires two adjacent tiles of equal value. Often, the sole tile preventing a player from playing all seven tiles in a turn is the 0. In addition, there are no points awarded for playing the 0.
- The player is not required to use two numbers between 1 and 10 to generate a solution. If a previous player played 8 × 3 = 24, a second player could take 3 × 24 = 72, getting rid of a high-value tile in a position that may not have been noticed by the previous player. Some two-digit additions also appear unexpectedly, such as 64 + 17 = 81.

== Variations on the game ==
There are no official variations or sequels to the game. More mathematically skilled players may wish to include operations such as exponentiation, logarithms, and modulo, or incorporate sequences using any number of adjacent tiles in a line (such as 4 × 2 + 2 = 10, where only the 10 is played).

== See also ==
- Numble
