= Scrabble Showdown =

- Presented by: Justin Willman
- Announcer: Randy Thomas
- Country of origin: United States
- Original language: English
- No. of seasons: 1
- No. of episodes: 30

Production
- Executive producers: Pat Finn; Bob Boden; Kevin Belinkoff; Stephen Davis
- Producers: Terry Finn; Joel McGee; John Ricci, Jr. Jana Morgan
- Running time: 30 minutes (including commercials)
- Production companies: Rubicon Entertainment; Hasbro Studios

Original release
- Network: The Hub
- Release: September 3, 2011 – April 15, 2012

Scrabble Showdown is an American game show created for the American cable network The Hub. The program was based on the board game Scrabble and was hosted by Justin Willman. It ran from September 3, 2011, to April 15, 2012.

== Gameplay ==
Two teams consisting of a parent and a child compete for the grand prize of tickets for a trip to anywhere in the world. The teams compete in a total of four rounds; winning any of the first three rounds earns a prize and two "Bonus Scrabble Tiles," which provide an advantage in the final round. If a round ends in a tie, both teams are awarded the prize and one tile. The team that wins the final round wins the game and the trip.

In most episodes, mini-games are played in the first two rounds and Scrabble Flash in the third; however, some episodes reverse this order.

=== Rounds 1 and 2 ===
One of the mini-games listed below is played in each round, varying from one episode to the next. The winner of a pre-game coin toss decides which team will play first in Round 1, and the winner of that round receives the same option for Round 2.

==== Scrabble Knockout ====
The team that goes first picks one of two categories, leaving the other for the opponents. A screen displays a word in the chosen category, with three extra letters inserted; however, the first and last letters are always correct. (E.g. BCUSPINEGSS for BUSINESS.) The parent must tell the child one incorrect letter at a time, and the child touches each letter to remove it. After all three incorrect letters have been removed, the parent must say the word in order to move on to the next one. Touching a correct letter causes the board to freeze; the child must then press a plunger to reset it and continue playing the same word.

The team's turn ends after five words have been solved or 60 seconds have elapsed, whichever comes first. If the opponents achieve a higher score or a faster time, they win the round; if not, the first team wins.

==== Scrabble Babble ====
The parent is shown a three-letter word with one missing letter, represented by a blank tile that can stand for any letter of his/her choosing. (E.g. C-A-blank could become CAT, CAR, CAN, etc.) He/she must think of a word and then describe it for the child to guess; if the child does so, a new word with one more letter is displayed, up to a maximum of seven on the fifth word. If the parent says any part of the word in play, it is thrown out and another word of the same length is played. If the parent says the entire word, the team's turn ends immediately.

The team's turn ends after five words have been solved or 60 seconds have elapsed, whichever comes first. If the team's turn is ended due to the parent committing a foul, the opponents are given the full 60 seconds regardless of the amount of time actually used. If the opponents achieve a higher score or a faster time, they win the round; if not, the first team wins.

==== Scrabble Scream ====
All words used in this round are divided into two parts; the first part is always three letters, while the second is three to five letters. The two parts are separately scrambled, and one team member is shown the first part and must recite the letters in the proper order. The other member must do the same with the second part and then say the entire word. The two team members trade roles after every word. (E.g. first player sees EAS and says S-E-A; second player sees CSKI and says S-I-C-K and SEASICK.)

The team's turn ends after five words have been solved or 60 seconds have elapsed, whichever comes first. If the opponents achieve a higher score or a faster time, they win the round; if not, the first team wins.

==== Scrabble Slam ====
All four players participate in this game, standing in line so that play alternates between members of opposing teams. The first player in line presses a button to stop a randomizer and set the time limit for the round (between 10 and 30 seconds); the clock is displayed on screen for the home audience, but is not shown to the teams. A four-letter word is shown on the screen, along with one extra letter that must be substituted into the word to make a new one. (E.g. HUNK and a T; "slam" the K with the T to form HUNT.) A correct answer passes control to the next player in line and brings up a new extra letter. When time runs out, the player in control is eliminated and the game is played again, with the next player in line setting the time limit. When both members of one team have been eliminated, their opponents win the round.

==== Scrabble Speedword ====
This game appears in only one episode and is not related to the "Speedword" hurry-up feature found on the 1980s game show. The child stands at a table with five tiles mounted on tracks, each displaying a different letter. These tracks are arranged into three connected rows with space for three letters each on the top/bottom rows and two in the middle. The parent calls out a three-letter word, and the child must move the letters to spell it out on the bottom row. Both teams use the same set of letters, and the team playing second waits in an offstage isolation booth until their turn comes.

The first team's turn ends after four words or 60 seconds, whichever comes first. The opposing team must outscore them or beat their time to win the round; otherwise, the first team wins.

=== Round 3: Scrabble Flash ===
The winners of Round 2 decide which team plays first. One team member at a time stands at a table with five giant tiles, each displaying a different letter, and must form a word of at least three letters. The members trade places after each word, scoring one point per letter used. At least one five-letter word can always be formed from the tiles. As in Scrabble Speedword, the team playing second waits in an isolation booth until their turn comes. The team that reaches the higher score after 30 seconds wins the round. If the scores are equal, the tie is broken in favor of the team that found more five-letter words; the round is only declared a complete tie if the teams are equal on both score and number of five-letter words.

=== Final Round: Scrabble Lightning ===
Sixteen letter tiles are displayed on the screen, each marked with its point value as in a regulation Scrabble game. Each team is given one chance to press a button and stop a randomizer, leaving one tile lit for every Bonus Scrabble Tile they earned in the first three rounds. The total value of each team's lit tiles is awarded to them as a "head start."

A scrambled word is displayed on a regulation Scrabble board whose letter bonus squares have been removed, leaving only the word bonus squares, and the host reads a clue. The first player to buzz in and solve the word scores its regulation value (doubled or tripled if any letter falls on a corresponding bonus square). Players must wait to buzz in until the host has read the entire clue. The children play the first word, and play alternates between them and the parents for each subsequent one. The first word covers the starred center square and is always played for double value, and every subsequent word uses one letter from a previous one and is laid out perpendicular to it.

The first team to reach 100 points, or the team in the lead when time is called, wins the game and the grand prize trip.

== Production ==
The show is produced by Rubicon Entertainment. Pat Finn serves as executive producer. Veteran game show producer Sande Stewart serves as creative consultant.
