= Teodor Moraru =

Romanian painter

- Teodor Moraru in 2010
- Born: 24 March 1938; Îndărăptnici, Orhei, Kingdom of Romania (today Republic of Moldavia)
- Died: 14 September 2011 (aged 73); Bucharest, Romania
- Known for: Painting

Teodor Moraru (24 March 1938 – 14 September 2011) was a contemporary Romanian painter.

== Life and career ==
Teodor Moraru was born in Îndărăptnici (today Nucăreni), a village in Orhei county, in Kingdom of Romania (today in Republic of Moldova). His father, Ion Moraru was a notary and his mother, Elisabeta née Goncearenko, was a teacher. In 1944, when the young Moraru was only six years old, the family flees to Transylvania, settling in Fundata commune, in Brașov county. In 1949 the family resettles in Poiana Mărului, where Moraru will attend gymnasium school. Here he meets Horia Bernea, with whom he develops a lifelong friendship. During this time, Moraru's parents divorce. His mother moves to Luciu commune, where she lived and taught until her death in 1985, and his father moves to Moieciu commune, near Bran, accepting a notary position and registering his son to a professional school near Brașov. After one year of military service, he enrols at the Technical School of Architecture in Bucharest (STACO), where again he finds Horia Bernea as a colleague and friend.

He graduates STACO in 1963. However, during this time, his interest shifts towards painting. In 1968 Moraru joins the Poiana Mărului Group, an intellectual circle of artists founded by Horia Bernea. The group highly influenced Moraru's early artistic development.

In 1971 Moraru holds his first solo exhibition at "Simeza Gallery" in Bucharest. This was followed by further solo shows in 1974, 1977, 1980. During 1983 he was artist-in-residence at the Cité internationale des arts in Paris where he also held a solo exhibition in 1984. Along the years, his works have been exhibited at important galleries from Paris, Copenhagen, Vienna, Prague, Berlin, Lisbon, Darmstadt, Tokyo, Hanoi and others.

Teodor Moaru, "Ritual" (1997).

In 1991 he takes up teaching at the Academy of Arts "Luceafarul" from Bucharest, where he will continue to teach until 2005. In 2003 some of his former pupils formed the group "Colonia 21".

During his career, Moraru received several important prizes among which is the Jury Prize of the Romanian Art Union, and the title of "Great Officer" in 2004, for his entire career.

In 2011 Moraru was admitted to the Municipal Hospital in Bucharest after suffering a minor stroke, and died on 14 September after complications arose during the medical treatment.

== The Teodor Moraru Grant ==
Founded in his memory, the Teodor Moraru Grant for painting was awarded between 2014 and 2018 to Romanian artists under 35 years of age.

== Selected Prizes and Honors ==
- 1980, Prize of "Arta" Magazine
- 1991, The Special Prize of The Romanian Art Union
- 1993, "Ion Andreescu" Prize from Romanian Academy
- 2001, First Prize for Painting of "Millenium2001" Exhibition
- 2001, Special Prize at "Lascăr Viorel" Exhibition, Piatra Neamț, Romania
- 2002, Prize for Painting from The Art Museum of Bacău, Romania
- 2003, The Jury Prize of The Romanian Art Union
- 2004, The Prize of Minister of Culture of The Republic of Moldova
- 2004, Awarded the Cultural Distinction of a "Great Officer"
- 2004, The Great Prize of The Romanian Art Union

== Gallery ==
”Terraces at Măcin", 1976

”Threshold", 1980

”Ladder", 1083, (Private collection)

”Ladder", 1994, National Museum of Contemporary Art (Romania)

”Ritual", 1994

”Torso", 2004

”The Wall", 2007
