= Ion Toderaș =

Moldovan ecologist and biologist (1948–2026)

- Born: 17 August 1948; Logănești, Moldavian SSR, Soviet Union
- Died: 4 May 2026 (aged 77)
- Education: Chișinău State University; Mechnikov University of Odessa
- Known for: Research in ecology and zoology; development of Apispir biostimulant
- Scientific career
- Fields: Ecology, biology
- Workplaces: State University of Moldova

Ion Toderaș (17 August 1948 – 4 May 2026) was a Moldovan ecologist and biologist.

== Life and career ==
Toderas was born in Logănești on 17 August 1948. He studied biology and pedagogy at the Chisinau State University, before earning a doctorate at the Mecinikov University of Odessa, becoming a doctor of biology.

Between 1988 and 2006 he held the position of head of the Department of Zoology and Ecology, Human and Animal Biology at the Faculty of Biology and Pedagogy of the State University of the Republic of Moldova.

He authored 59 patents, five of implementations in the national economy of the Apispir preparation as a biostimulating remedy for the prolificacy and productivity of bee families carried out in collaboration with the National Institute of Microbiology and Biotechnology of the Academy of Sciences of Moldova.

Toderaș died on 4 May 2026, at the age of 77.

== Awards ==
- 2019: Order of the Republic
