= Paul Gallant =

Canadian entrepreneur

Paul-Émile Gallant (July 17, 1944 – September 13, 2011) was a Canadian entrepreneur who developed Puzz 3D three-dimensional jigsaw puzzles. He is also credited with inventing both the Wrebbit Puzzle Machine, which is now known as the Puzzle Shots Factory, and the Perfalock flat foam puzzle.

Gallant was born in Edmundston, New Brunswick. He initially began his career in the music industry, which lasted approximately eighteen years. Gallant worked for Trans Canada Musique, Columbia Records (a division of Sony Music) and the CBC.

Gallant switched careers and began working in the toy industry in the late 1980s. He began working on a new concept for the traditional puzzle, but involving 3D solutions inspired by commercial design. Gallant reportedly completed his prototype for what would be called Puzz-3D after one year of design.

In 1989, Gallant laminated polyethylene foam, the same type used to insulate airliner cockpits, with paper and built his first 3D puzzle (a miniature wall) on his kitchen table.

His new Puzz 3D puzzles, which often could be built into models of actual buildings and other landmark structures, could be placed on display indefinitely after completion. He founded his own company for Puzz 3D, which he called Wrebbit Inc., in partnership with Rene Binette. The logo for Wrebbit became an easily identifiable frog. The three dimensional product line was launched at the Canadian Toy & Hobby Fair in 1992.

A crucial entry to the US market started when Gallant drove from Montreal to New York's FAO Schwarz, the oldest toy store in the US, in September 1991 and convinced their toy buyer to immediately order 72 puzzles.

Gallant spearheaded the expansion of Wrebbit and its keystone toy, Puzz 3D, throughout Canada and elsewhere in the world. The Puzz 3D product line was made in Canada, but sold in more than 40 countries worldwide. Approximately 30 million Puzz 3D puzzles were bought by global consumers by 2000. Irwin Toys purchased Wrebbit in 2001, but Irwin Toys went out of business in 2002 and Gallant once again became the owner of Wrebbit and Puzz 3D. Gallant sold Wrebbit and its product lines to the international toy manufacturer, Hasbro, in 2005.

Gallant was awarded the Canada Export Achievement Award in 1995. The following year, he became the recipient of the Canada-America Business Achievement Award in 1996. In 2008, Gallant was inducted into the Canadian Toy Industry Hall of Fame.

Gallant died on September 13, 2011, in Laval, Quebec, at the age of 67 due to brain cancer. He was survived by his three children, ten grandchildren and two sisters. His wife, Françoise, died in 2010.
