= Sharon Anderson-Gold =

American educator (1947–2011)

Sharon Anderson-Gold (November 18, 1947 – September 26, 2011) was a professor and chair at the Science and Technology Studies Department at Rensselaer Polytechnic Institute.

== Biography ==
Prior to becoming chair of the STS department in 2004, Anderson-Gold served as acting and associate dean of the Humanities and Social Sciences Department.

She was chair of the H&SS curriculum committee, and was the director of the First-Year Studies program. In 1999, she became an STS faculty member, specialized in applied ethics and social and political philosophy. She also showed interest in the history of modern philosophy, Kantian ethics, bioethics, or human rights.

== Death ==
Sharon Anderson-Gold died from cancer on September 26, 2011, aged 63. She was survived by her husband Howard Gold and their sons, Jason Harris Gold and Jordan Benjamin Gold.

== Works ==
- 2001 :Unnecessary Evil: History and Moral Development in the Philosophy of Immanuel Kant. State University of New York Press.
- 2001 :Cosmopolitanism and Human Rights. University of Wales Press.
- 2002 : Ambivalence and Identity in Black Culture. Race, Social Identity and Human Dignity, Vol. 16, Social Philosophy Today Book Series, ed. Cheryl Hughes, Philosophy Documentation Center (July 2002).
- 2003 :Objectivity in Environmental Ethics. Truth and Objectivity in Social Ethics. Social Philosophy Today Vol. 18, ed. by Cheryl Hughes, Philosophy Documentation Center.
- 2003 : Prophetic History. Geschichtsphilosophie, ed. by Johannes Rohbeck and Herta Nagl-Docekal. Darmstadt, Germany: Wissenschaftliche Buchgesellschaft (WBG).
