= Henry Lacey =

South African cricketer (1920–2011)

Personal information
- Born: 31 May 1920; Johannesburg, South Africa
- Died: 22 September 2011 (aged 91); Cape Town, South Africa
- Source: Cricinfo, 6 December 2020

Henry Lacey (31 May 1920 – 22 September 2011) was a South African cricketer. He played in twenty-one first-class matches from 1945/46 to 1956/57.
