= Nykodym Rusnak =

Ukrainian Orthodox metropolitan bishop (1921–2011)

His Eminence Nykodym
- Metropolitan
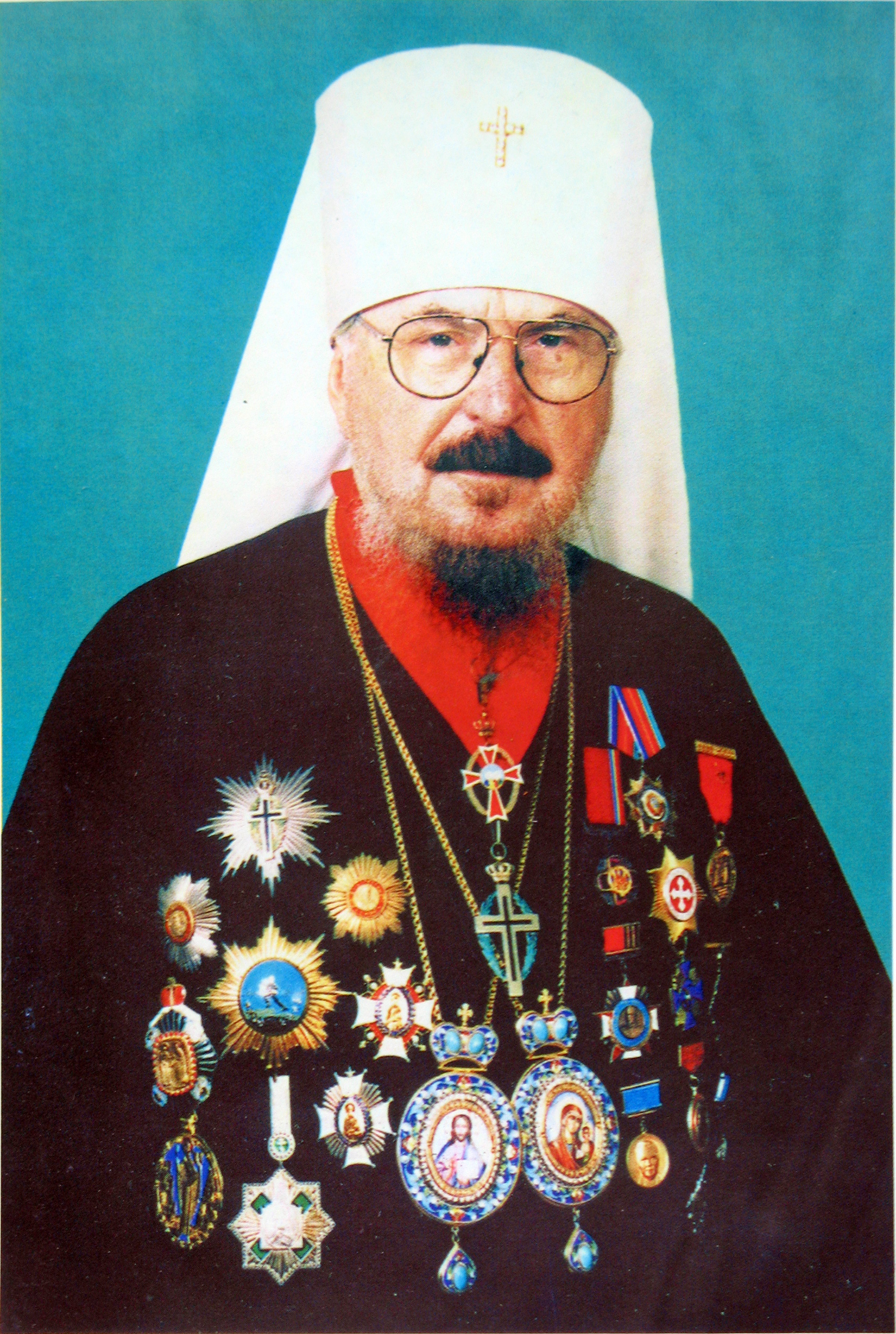
- Church: Ukrainian Orthodox Church (Moscow Patriarchate)

Orders
- Ordination: 29 April 1945
- Rank: Metropolitan

Personal details
- Born: Mykola Stepanovych Rusnak; 18 April 1921 Davydivtsi, Kingdom of Romania (now Ukraine)
- Died: 15 September 2011 (aged 90) Holy Intercession Monastery, Kharkiv, Ukraine
- Denomination: Eastern Orthodoxy

Metropolitan Nykodym, secular name Mykola Stepanovych Rusnak (Ukrainian: Микола Степанович Руснак; 18 April 1921 – 15 September 2011) was the Ukrainian Orthodox metropolitan bishop of Kharkiv and Bohodukhiv.

He was born in 1921 in Davydivtsi, Chernivtsi. On 6 January 1945, he took monastic tonsure and was ordained three months later, on 29 April 1945.

He died at the Bishops' residence in the Holy Intercession Monastery, Kharkiv, on 15 September 2011.
