= Bruce Dan =

American research physician

Bruce Bespalow Dan, M.D. (December 20, 1946 – September 6, 2011) was one of the lead American researchers with the Toxic Shock Syndrome Task Force who established the link between toxic shock syndrome and the use of tampons.

Dan died September 6, 2011, at Johns Hopkins Hospital, in Baltimore, Maryland, from complications stemming from a bone marrow transplant received to cure leukemia. He is buried in Garden of Remembrance Cemetery, Clarksburg, Maryland.
