= Numble =

Numble is a 1968 board game published by Selchow and Righter which is very similar to Scrabble. Instead of forming words, players form sequences adhering to certain arithmetic and numerical constraints.

Each tile in Numble has a single digit, 0 through 9, except for two blanks. A "word" in Numble is a string of digits in sequence (either ascending or descending). For example, 2,3,6,7 is a valid sequence (ascending), as is 7,6,3,2 (descending) while 3,6,7,1,1 (the same numbers) is not in sequence. Also, the sum of the digits must be a multiple of 3. (7+6+3+2=18, and 18 is 6 times 3.)

A zero is allowed at each end and duplicate digits are allowed (except for having more than one zero at either end). The following is valid; 0,2,3,6,7,0 but not 0,0,2,3,6,7 or 2,3,6,7,0,0. 1,1,3,6,7 is okay too.

Each tile is worth its digit's value in points.

A blank could be placed anywhere and, unlike in Scrabble, did not count as a particular digit, so the same blank tile could, for example, be between 3 and 4 in a horizontal sequence and between 8 and 9 in a vertical one. (This is used to get the extra points from a board square)

Some other differences from Scrabble are: a rack is six tiles instead of seven; the center square is not a "double word square"; and, playing all six tiles in your rack at once scores a 10-point bonus instead of 50.

== See also ==
- Mixmath
