= Ralph Lomma =

Popularizer of miniature golf

Ralph John Lomma (March 13, 1924 – September 12, 2011) is often credited, along with his brother, Al, with popularizing miniature golf in the mid-1950s through their design and manufacture of now famous obstacles such as castles, clown heads and windmills. Lomma Enterprises, which Ralph Lomma founded, is still in business today.

== History ==
In 1959, he engineered the development of Elk Mountain, Pennsylvania into a ski resort and in 1961, Lomma founded the Village of Four Seasons, Pennsylvania. Lomma Enterprises is the world's largest supplier for the pint-size sport, with courses in all 50 states and five continents. Lomma claimed that one course was built in a federal penitentiary and another aboard an aircraft carrier, nearly 6,000 miniature golf courses in all.

In the 1980s, Lomma was appointed by Ronald Reagan to the Coast Guard Commission and sat on the board of directors of Allied Artists Pictures Corporation, at that time involved with the production of The Wild Geese, starring Richard Harris, and Cabaret starring Liza Minnelli.
