= Alexei Simașchevici =

Moldovan physicist (1929–2026)

Alexei Simașchevici (27 June 1929 – 26 January 2026) was a Moldovan physicist.

== Life and career ==
Simașchevici was born on 27 June 1929. He was a full member of the Academy of Sciences of Moldova. He was a member of the CPSU.

Simașchevici died on 26 January 2026, at the age of 96.

== Awards ==
Simașchevici was awarded the Order of Labour, first class, and in 2019 he was awarded the Order of the Republic.
