= Logănești =

- Village
- Location within Moldova
- Coordinates: 46°54′11″N 28°32′32″E
- Country: Moldova
- District: Hîncești District

Government
  - Mayor: Valentin Danu (PLDM)
- Elevation: 152 m (499 ft)

Population (2014 census)
  - Total: 3,521
- Time zone: UTC+2 (EET)
  - Summer (DST): UTC+3 (EEST)
- Postal code: MD-3434

Logănești is a village in Hîncești District, Moldova.

The 2004 census found a population of 4119, of whom nearly 99% declared as Moldovan.

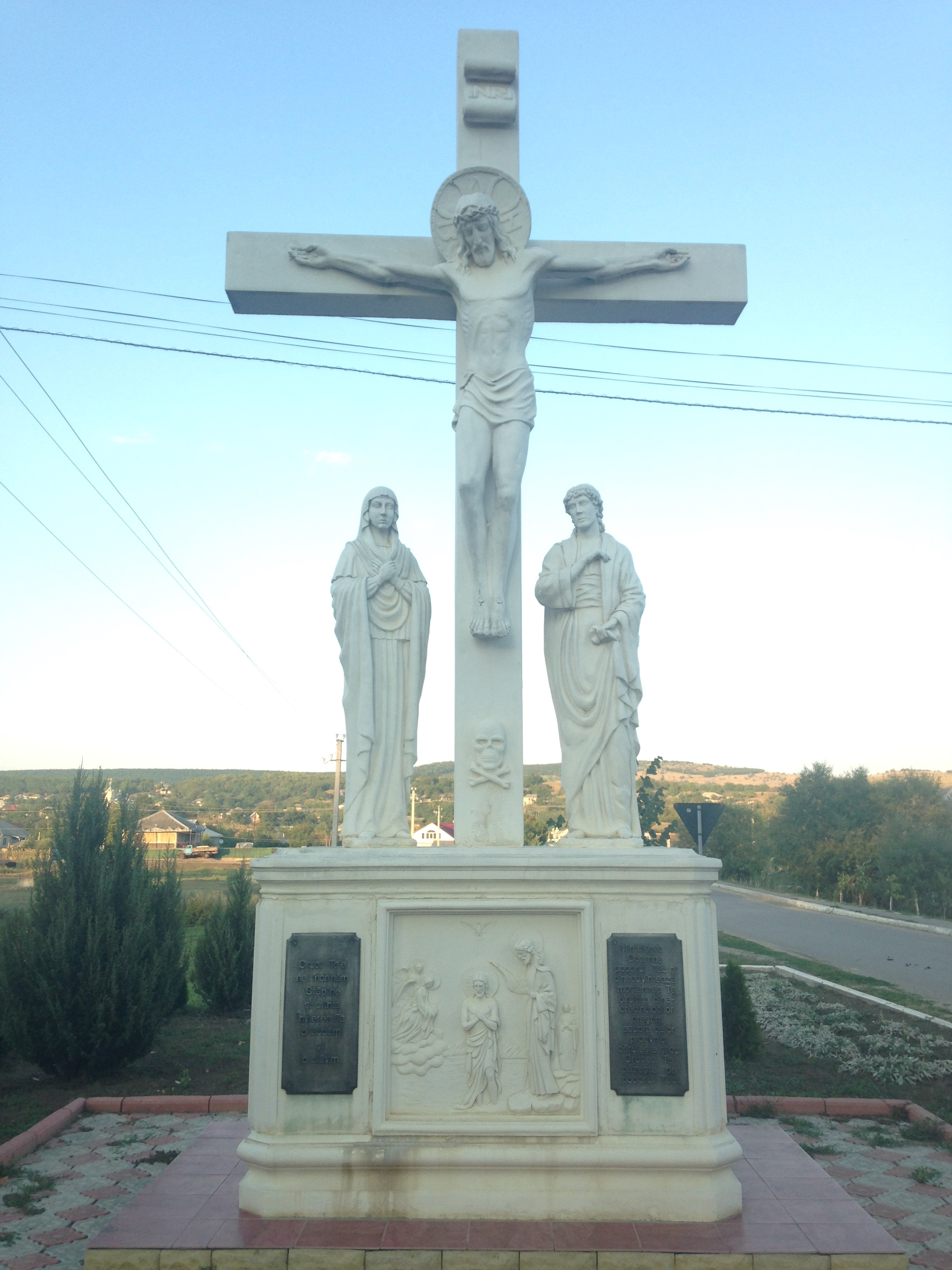
Religious sculpture at the village entrance

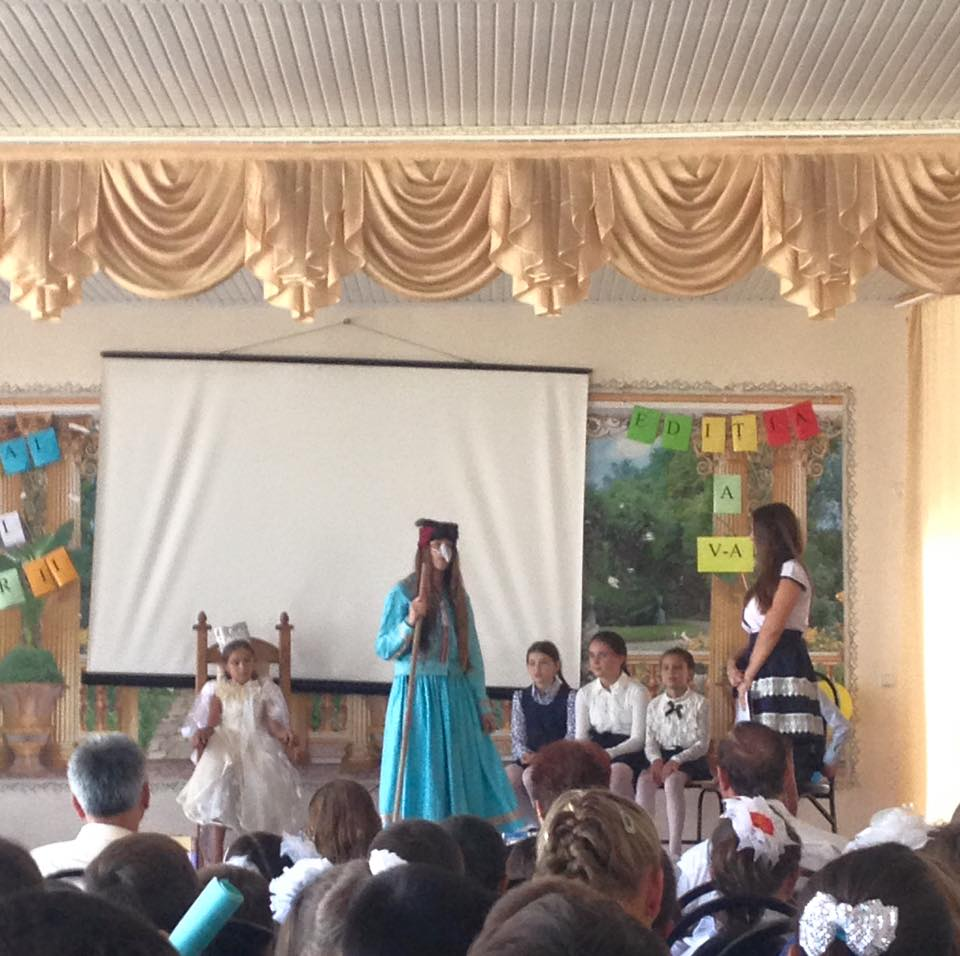
Book festival

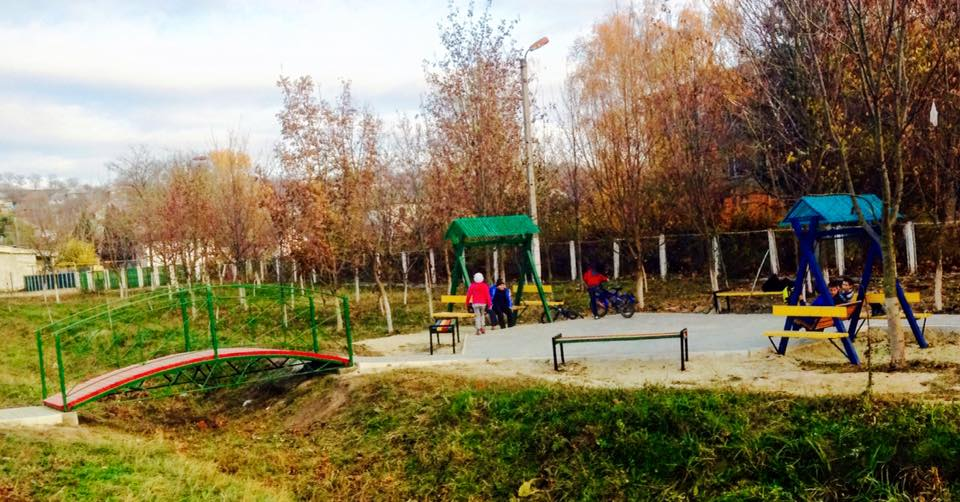
Playground (opened 2015)

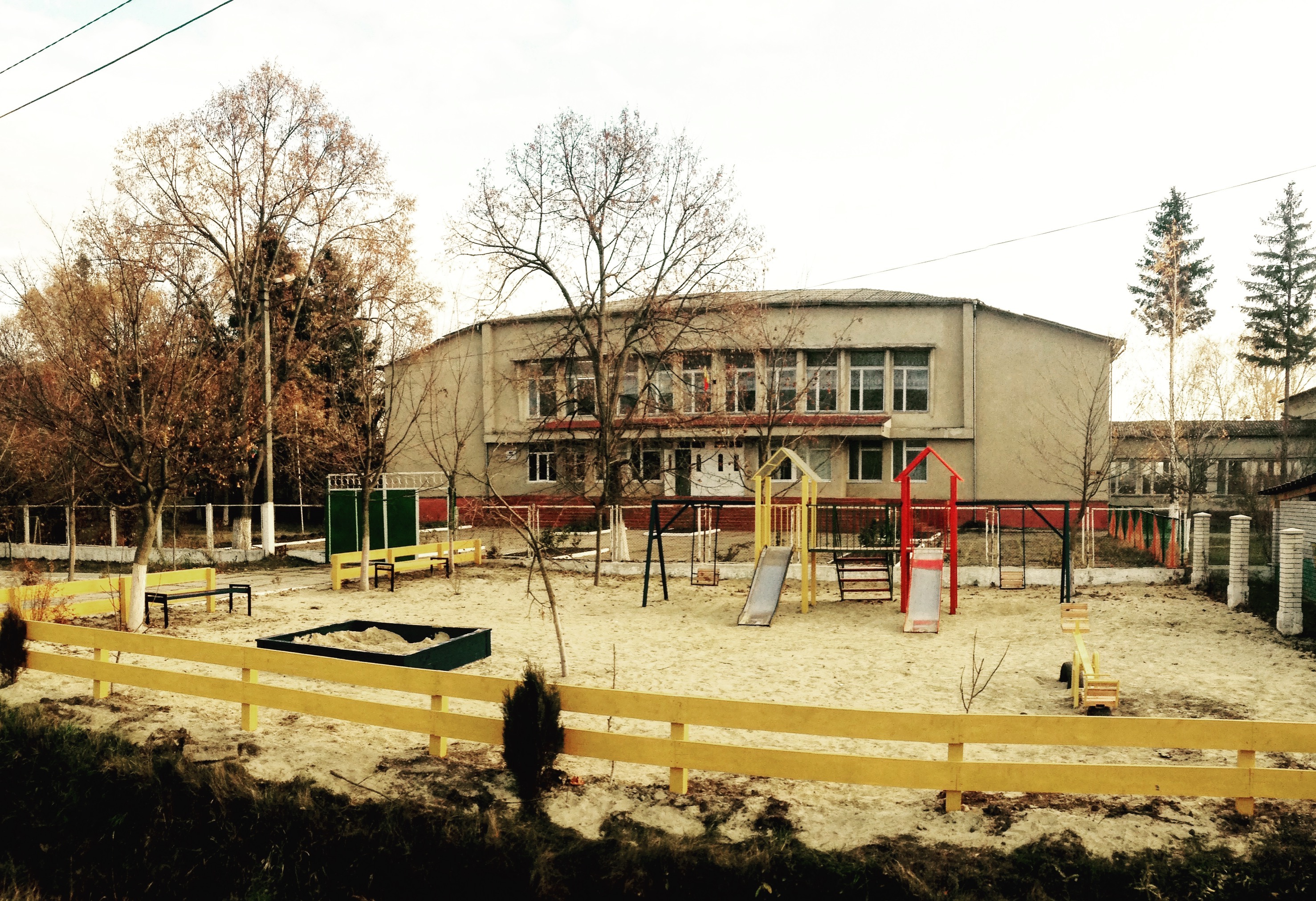
Gymnasium

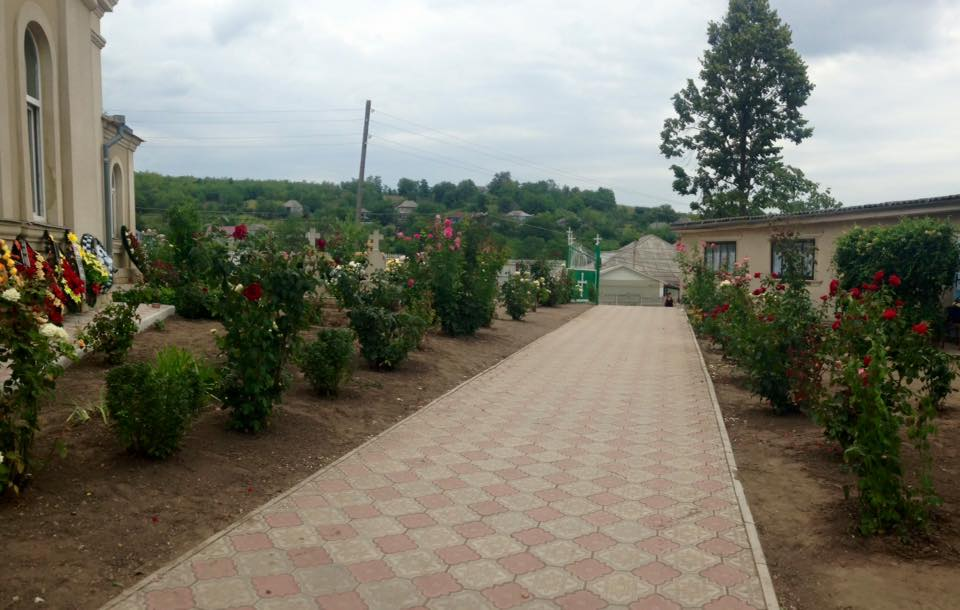
Orthodox church grounds

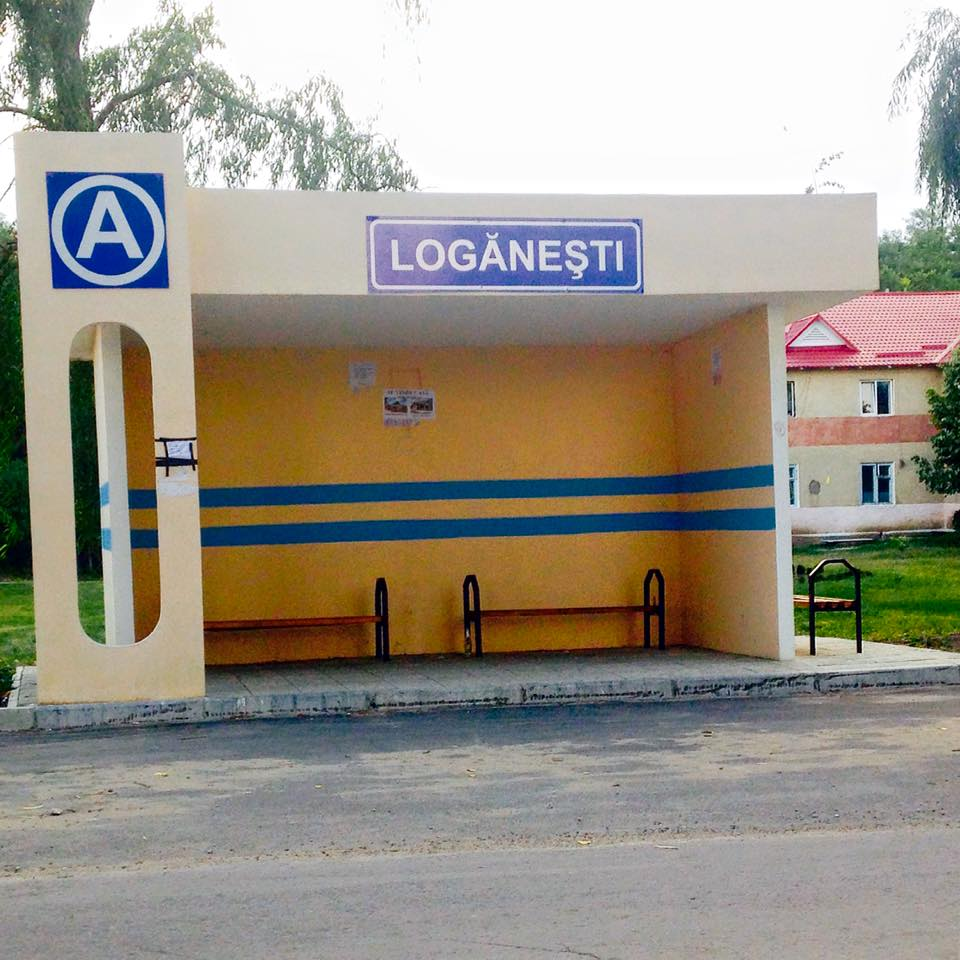
Bus station
