= Ramon Amigó Anglès =

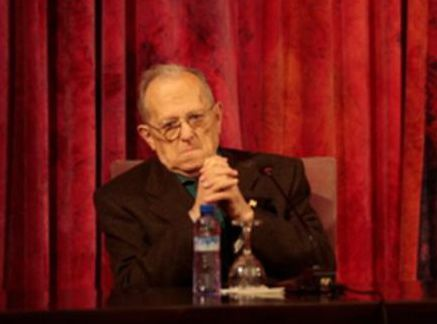
Ramon Amigó Anglès

Ramon Amigó Anglès (1925–2011) (Spanish) was a writer, a teacher of Catalan and an onomast.

== Biography ==
Ramon Amigó Anglès was born in Reus, Baix Camp, to Ramon Amigó Pujol, from Falset, and Rosa Anglès Solé, from Reus. They had another son, who died before Ramon was born, and a daughter called Rosa. His education began at Cros de Reus school and in 1936 he went on to the Grup Escolar Francesc Macià. In 1937 he started secondary education but did not finish his first year there as the Spanish Civil War caused him to move to Selva, where he lived until the start of 1939. Nevertheless, through informal education he managed to learn Catalan, French, English and basic Latin. In the 1940s he was greatly influenced in the field of Catalan language teaching by Teresa Miquel i Pàmies, a disciple of Pompeu Fabra. During the same period he developed his knowledge of literature and politics thanks to the teachings of Joaquim Santasusagna, an acclaimed geographer, writer and activist. Due to his father's imprisonment following the end of the war, Ramon had to give up his studies to work in a company exporting nuts and dried fruit, and given his command of French, English and German, he was tasked with handling the business's international correspondence. In his friendships with Joaquim Santasusagna and Josep Iglésies, a geographer, historian and writer, he developed an interest in studies of the local territory. These pursuits led to his involvement in the Associació Excursionista de Reus, a hiking association founded in the autumn of 1947, of which he was president. He was responsible for changing the language of its newsletter to Catalan as of the 1960s and he contributed to historical and linguistic studies of municipalities in Camp de Tarragona. His work enabled the republication of the hiking guide Les muntanyes de Prades, el Montsant i Serra la Llena (1960). In the latter part of the 1940s he took part in the clandestine cultural gatherings known as the maquis de la poesia, in which Joaquim Santasusagna was also involved. In 1949, together with Xavier Amorós and Josep Maria Arnavat (the three were known as the Triple A), he collaborated in the Amics de la Poesia (Friends of Poetry) group, under the umbrella of the literary section of the Centre de Lectura de Reus, which had by then been reopened.

In 1961 he began working with teachers Teresa Miquel and Robert Miralles to organize Catalan language classes. Supported by the Òmnium Cultural advisory board for education, it was a project aimed at forming a critical mass of teachers ready to help people make more use of a language that had suffered oppression under Franco's dictatorship. Their work led to the organization of an education section of the Fòrum Joventut youth association, supported by the church in Reus. They also launched elementary level correspondence courses for towns and villages across Camp de Tarragona, in which several dozen students took part. Amigó became involved in two noteworthy civic organizations: the aforementioned Centre de Lectura and the Associació d'Estudis Reusencs. He was secretary of the latter – which published research into the history and culture of Reus and Baix Camp – from 1959 to 1975. During that time he changed the language for all the institution's internal documents to Catalan. He later became its president, lasting in the role from 1979 to 1997. This period included the drafting of new statutes in 1984 and a broadening of the scope of research to include language studies. From June 1973 to June 1975 he was the president of the Centre de Lectura and editor of its Revista publication, and he made it a participant in national Catalan activities such as the Flama de la Llengua Catalana. He was also considered an important figure in onomatology and was teacher to a generation of learned scholars in Camp de Tarragona.

Amigó published various books on toponymy as well as route guides for the parts of the country known as Catalunya Nova. He gave seminars on onomatology at the University of Valencia, the University of Lleida and the Rovira i Virgili University in Tarragona. From 1980 until his death he was vice president of the Onomatology Society of Catalonia. And from 1994 until his death he was a member of the Philological Section of the Institute for Catalan Studies. In 1997 he was awarded the Creu de Sant Jordi.

He died in Reus on 16 September 2011. A service was held at the funeral home of the same city, where the flag was flown at half mast with a black ribbon. Reus named a square after him, opposite the Mas Iglésies building, which houses centres for visual arts and photography.

== Publications ==
- Els topònims de la ciutat i el terme de Reus. Reus: Associació d'Estudis Reusencs, 1957. Awarded the Premi Eduard Brossa prize in 1955 by the Catalan Geographic Society.
- Les muntanyes de Prades, el Montsant i Serra la Llena. With Josep Iglésies i Fort and Joaquim Santasusagna. Barcelona: Rafael Dalmau, 1960
- Els topònims del terme municipal i del poble de La Mussara. Tarragona: La Diputació, 1963. Awarded the Premi Eduard Brossa prize in 1961 by the Catalan Geographic Society.
- Els topònims del terme municipal i del poble de Constantí. Tarragona: La Diputació, 1968
- Toponímia dels termes municipals i nuclis de població de Castellvell del Camp i d'Almoster. Reus: Associació d'Estudis Reusencs, 1968
- Toponímia de Vila-seca de Solcina i del seu terme municipal. Vila-seca: Salou: Agrupació Cultural de Vila-seca – Salou, 1978
- Toponímia de terme municipal de Vilallonga de Ter. Barcelona: Fundació Salvador Vives Casajuana, 1979 ISBN 8423201384
- Noms de lloc i de persona del terme de Prades. Reus: Associació d'Estudis Reusencs; Prades: l'Ajuntament, 1985 ISBN 8439841183
- Materials per a l'estudi dels noms de lloc i de persona i renoms del terme de Reus. Reus: Associació d'Estudis Reusencs, 1988. ISBN 8486387655
- Sobre inventaris de noms de lloc: introducció metodològica. Reus: Centre de Lectura, 1989
- Noms actuals i pretèrits del terme antic de Cornudella de Montsant. Amb Joan Bpta. Espasa Ballester. Reus: Associació d'Estudis Reusencs, 1990 ISBN 8440484364
- Evarist Fàbregas i el seu temps. Amb Jordi Tous i Enric Ucelay Da Cal. Reus: Centre de Lectura, 1990 ISBN 8440464916
- L'ensenyança de la llengua catalana, des de Reus, sota el franquisme: homenatge a Teresa Miquel i Pàmies. Reus: Centre de Lectura, 1994 ISBN 8487873103
- Siurana de Prades: enllà de la llegenda i la història. Barcelona: Fundació Roger de Belfort: Institut d'Estudis Catalans, 1995 ISBN 8472832821
- Amb penyals d'un blau cansat. Reus: Centre de Lectura, 1998 ISBN 8487873251
- Siurana de Prades: la terra i la gent. Barcelona: Rafael Dalmau, 1998 ISBN 8423205266
- Introducció a la recerca en toponímia i antroponímia. Barcelona: Abadia de Montserrat, 1999. ISBN 8484150755
- Les Places del Mercat a la ciutat de Reus : Un assaig historicista. Reus: Centre de Lectura, 1999 ISBN 8487873316
- Llenguatge endins: un recorregut històric pels noms de lloc . Reus: Centre de Lectura, 2000. ISBN 8487873332
- L'Albi i els seus noms. Barcelona: Institut d'Estudis Catalans, 2001.
- El tràfic amb el fred, al Camp de Tarragona: segles XVI – XIX. Barcelona: Abadia de Montserrat, 2002 ISBN 848415422X
- Les Etimologies, el territori de Tarragona, l'aigua, a Reus: un tríptic reusenc. Reus: Associació d'Estudis Reusencs, 2004 ISBN 8493232475
- Homenatges, debats i records de muntanya. Reus: Centre de Lectura: Centre d'Amics de Reus, 2005 ISBN 8487873588
- Espigoladures onomàstiques. Barcelona: Abadia de Montserrat, 2005 ISBN 8484157172
- La Mussara un vell afecte: notícies històriques disperses. Barcelona: Rafael Dalmau, 2006 ISBN 8423206971
- Onomàstica del terme municipal de Constantí. Barcelona: Institut d'Estudis Catalans, 2008 ISBN 9788472839847
- Onomàstica del terme municipal de Pratdip. Barcelona: Institut d'Estudis Catalans, 2010.
- Onomàstica del terme municipal de Porrera. Barcelona: Institut d'Estudis Catalans, 2011 ISBN 9788499650715
- Onomàstica i llenguatge: de cap a cap del país. Barcelona: Rafael Dalmau, 2011 ISBN 9788423207558

== Awards ==
- 1955: Premi Eduard Brossa, from the Catalan Geographic Society.
- 1961: Premi Eduard Brossa, from the Catalan Geographic Society.
- 1997: Creu de Sant Jordi.
- Gold Medal of Reus.

== Bibliography ==
- X. Ferré Trill. Ramon Amigó i Anglès, pedagog del territori (1925–2011): aportació a la sociabilitat cultural. Barcelona: Publicacions de l'Abadia de Montserrat, 2013. ISBN 9788498836387
- Nota necrològica per Joaquim Mallafrè, Estudis Romànics 35 (2013), p. 709–711
