= Wrebbit =

Discontinued Canadian puzzle-making company

Logo

Wrebbit, Inc was a now-discontinued, puzzle-making company best known for its Puzz 3D puzzles. The company was founded in Montreal, Quebec, by Paul Gallant, and marketed itself as "The Puzzle Innovators". Its namesake appears to stem from the fact that the company's mascot is a green frog, and "Wrebbit" is either an alternative spelling or possibly a play-on words of the word ribbit.

In the late 1990s, all of three-dimensional puzzles were a successful fad, leading to a rapid growth in the company. In 2001, the business was bought by Irwin Toy. When Irwin Toy filed for bankruptcy a year later, Gallant bought back the business and relaunched it in a much reduced state. In 2005, the business was bought by the US-based Hasbro, which moved the manufacture of Wrebbit's puzzles to its facility in East Longmeadow, Massachusetts, in 2006.

Gallant died on September 13, 2011. In 2012, Gallant's son and a partner who worked for Wrebbit revived the Wrebbit name and founded Wrebbit 3D Puzzle, producing the same type of puzzle as Puzz 3D.
