= Nucăreni =

- Village
- Location within Moldova
- Coordinates: 47.5969444444°N 28.5836111111°E
- Country: Moldova
- District: Telenești District

Government
  - Mayor: Mariana Ombun (PLDM)

Population (2014 census)
  - Total: 917
- Time zone: UTC+2 (EET)
  - Summer (DST): UTC+3 (EEST)

Nucăreni is a village in Telenești District, Moldova composed of a single village, Nucăreni.
