= Puzz 3D =

Brand of three-dimensional jigsaw puzzles

- Logo
- Manufacturers: Hasbro
- Years active: 1991–2006, 2011–present
- Age range: Dependent on puzzle

Puzz 3D is the brand name of three-dimensional jigsaw puzzles, manufactured by Hasbro and formerly by Wrebbit, Inc. Unlike traditional puzzles which are composed of series of flat pieces that when put together, create a single unified image, the Puzz 3D series of puzzles are composed on plastic foam, with part of an image graphed on a stiff paper facade glued to the underlying foam piece and cut to match the piece's dimensions. When the pieces are put together, they create a standing structure.

== History ==
Puzz 3D puzzles, invented by Paul Gallant, were first made in 1991 under the Quebec-based company Wrebbit. Throughout the 1990s, three-dimensional puzzles were made, leading to a rapid growth in the company.

In 1993, Hasbro's Milton Bradley Company bought Wrebbit's Puzz 3D Line, and in 2005 Hasbro themselves completely bought Wrebbit. In 2006, Hasbro moved the manufacture of Wrebbit's puzzles to its East Longmeadow, Massachusetts facility.

The last series made under Hasbro was Towers Made to Scale. The series consisted of 13 skyscrapers from around the world, including the Petronas Towers, Sears Tower, Empire State Building, Chrysler Building, Citigroup Center, Taipei 101, and the John Hancock Center, among others. All of the structures were made to be at 1:585 scale, and all of the towers glowed in the dark.

By 2006, all of the Puzz 3D puzzles had been discontinued, but in 2011, the Puzz 3D line was revitalized by Winning Solutions, Inc., who first released the Eiffel Tower and Empire State Building, and released a model of Anif Palace in 2012. As of 2014, Hasbro has brought some of the old Puzz 3D line back into production (made in China) in the same boxes. A separate company Wrebbit3D, making new products along with some of the old line, has been created by some of the old Wrebbit staff.

== Puzzles ==
A New York City puzzle with 3141 pieces

Typically, the structures released were famous landmarks, including the White House, Big Ben, CN Tower, and the Neuschwanstein Castle. In addition to this, Puzz 3D has also released science-fiction themed puzzles, such as the Millennium Falcon spacecraft from the Star Wars franchise, and structures from legends such as King Arthur's castle at Camelot. Puzz 3D also released buildings of notable time periods, including a Victorian Mansion. In addition to these structures, they have also produced classic cars, such as the 1956 Ford Thunderbird. Puzz 3D also released a puzzle based on Monopoly, which allows for putting the puzzle together and then playing the game. The puzzles released also include a New York City puzzle, which includes the area around the World Trade Center and the Empire State Building. This puzzle is Hasbro's largest, at 3141 pieces.

== Games ==
Puzz 3D games were also made for Microsoft Windows and Macintosh computers. Users first build the puzzle, which is a digital version of an existing 3D puzzle, by clicking and dragging the pieces. When completed, a fictional mystery must be solved taking place in that landmark. Four games were made for Windows and Mac. These are Puzz 3D: Neuschwanstein Bavarian Castle, Puzz 3D: Notre Dame Cathedral, Puzz 3D: The Orient Express, and Puzz 3D: Victorian Mansion. A fifth game was also made of The Lamplight Manor featuring a 3D tour when completed.
