= IACM =

IACM may refer to:

- International Association for Computational Mechanics
- International Association for Cannabinoid Medicines
- Mozambican Civil Aviation Institute
