= Murder–suicide =

Committing murder and suicide

A murder–suicide is an act where an individual intentionally kills one or more people, before or while also killing themselves. The suicide may be in response to the guilt one feels for the murder, or to avoid potential punishments, such as imprisonment. Some forms of murder also inherently entail suicide; such as suicide attacks, or when the operator of an aircraft with passengers deliberately crashes it.

Many perpetrators of spree killings, such as mass shootings, either end their own lives afterwards, or intend to be killed by police. Some cases of religiously motivated mass suicides have also involved murder. All categorization amounts to forming somewhat arbitrary distinctions where relating to intention in the case of psychosis, where the intention(s) is/are more likely than not to be irrational. Ascertaining the legal intention (mens rea) is inapplicable to cases properly categorized as insanity.

The term sometimes includes more general cases of homicide rather than strictly murder ('homicide–suicide'), meaning that cases of manslaughter are included.

According to an analysis of The Times of London's reports of murder (1887–1990) by Danson and Soothill (1996), there is a much higher proportion of British male murder–suicides, in general, than female. Overwhelmingly the women committing murder–suicide tend to kill their children and then themselves. Men, on the other hand, tend to kill their spouses or partners and then themselves.

== India ==
In India, cases in which a parent or caregiver kills a child and then themselves, described in Indian forensic literature as filicide–suicide or "dyadic death", are not recorded as a separate category in national crime statistics. They are generally counted as ordinary homicides or left unclassified, so information on their frequency comes largely from medicolegal autopsy studies.

A five-year retrospective study from the Jamnagar region of Gujarat described a cluster of cases in which mothers killed their young children by drowning or burning before killing themselves, mostly against a background of low socioeconomic status and family-related distress.

A ten-year study of 448 consecutive medicolegal autopsies of children aged 1–12 years, conducted at Government Medical College, Thiruvananthapuram, Kerala, between 2005 and 2014, found that 59 deaths (13.2%) were dyadic deaths. In each of these, a parent or caregiver killed the child before taking their own life. A further 35 deaths (7.8%) were homicides in which the perpetrator did not die by suicide, so dyadic death was the more common of the two. Together the two categories made up about one in five of all childhood deaths in the series.

The victims of dyadic death were disproportionately young: 39% were aged one to three years. Girls made up 59% of victims. The most common methods were drowning and poisoning (15 cases each), followed by hanging (14), burns (7), strangulation (6) and railway-related deaths (2). Across the whole series, fatal poisonings of children were more often homicidal or dyadic than accidental, and agricultural pesticides were the most common agents.

== Theories ==
Ajax, son of Telamon, preparing suicide. Reproduction from a black-figure amphora depiction by Exekias (550–525 BC).

According to psychiatrist Karl A. Menninger, murder and suicide are interchangeable acts – suicide sometimes forestalling murder, and vice versa. Following Freudian logic, severe repression of natural instincts due to early childhood abuse may lead the death instinct to emerge in a twisted form. The cultural anthropologist Ernest Becker, whose theories on the human notion of death are strongly influenced by Freud, views the fear of death as a universal phenomenon, a fear repressed in the unconscious and of which people are largely unaware.

This fear can move individuals toward heroism, but also to scapegoating. Failed attempts to achieve heroism, according to this view, can lead to mental illness and/or antisocial behavior.

In a study specifically related to murder–suicide, Milton Rosenbaum (1990) discovered the murder–suicide perpetrators to be vastly different from perpetrators of homicide alone. Whereas murderer–suicides were found to be highly depressed and overwhelmingly men, other murderers were not generally depressed and more likely to include women in their ranks. In the U.S. the overwhelming number of cases are male-on-female. Around one-third of partner homicides end in the suicide of the perpetrator. From national and international data and interviews with family members of murder–suicide perpetrators, the following are the key predictors of murder–suicide: a history of substance abuse, the male partner some years older than the female partner, a break-up or pending break-up, a history of battering, and suicidal contemplation by the perpetrator.

Though there is no national tracking system for murder–suicides in the United States, medical studies into the phenomenon estimate between 1,000 and 1,500 deaths per year in the US, with the majority occurring between spouses or intimate partners and the vast majority of the perpetrators being male. Depression, marital or/and financial problems, and other problems are generally motivators.

Homicides which are later followed by suicide often make headline news; national statistics indicate 5% of all homicidal deaths are caused by murder–suicides. The U.S. Department of Health and Human Services, Centers for Disease Control reports that an estimated 1 million adults reported attempting suicide in 2011, and there were over 38,000 completed suicides in the same period. The estimate of 624 murder–suicide events per year indicates that around 1.6% of suicides involve murder.

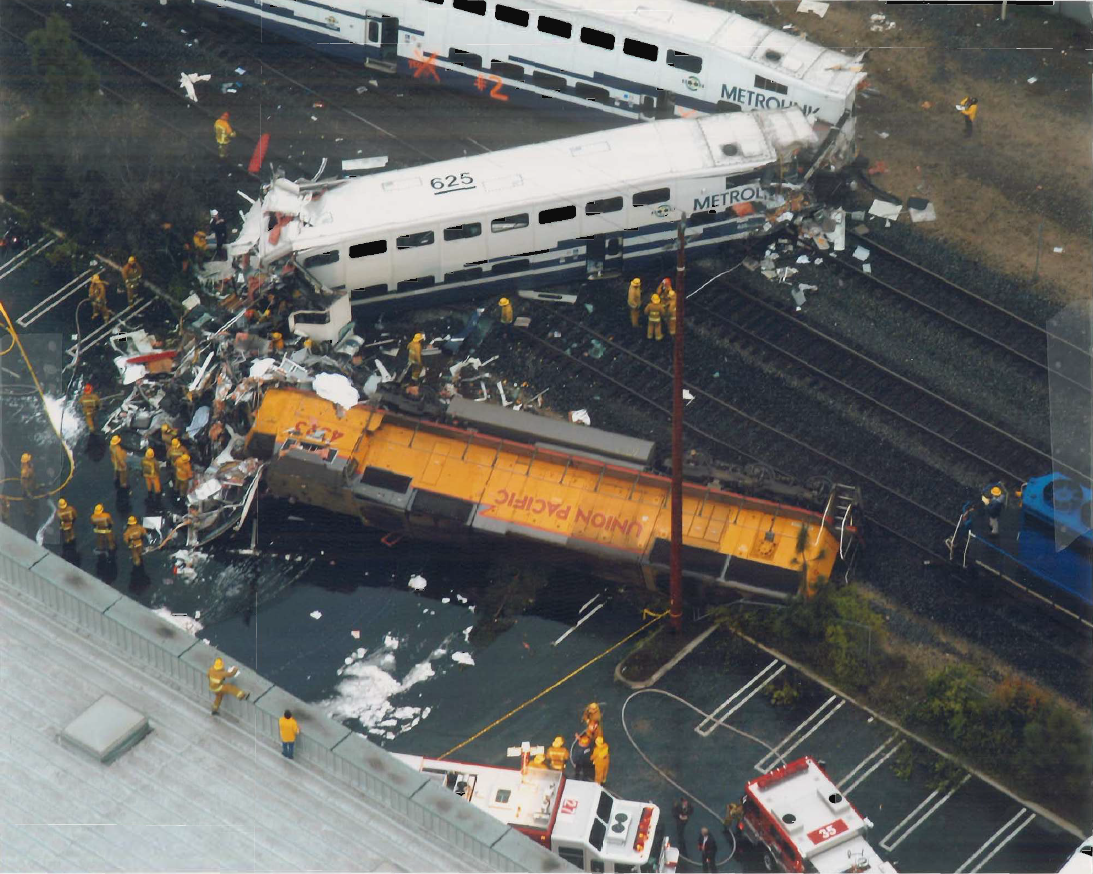
The 2005 Glendale train crash was caused by a suicidal motorist who changed his mind, but deliberately left his vehicle on the tracks at a railroad crossing, killing 11 people and injuring more than 170 others.

In 18th-century Denmark, people wishing to die by suicide would sometimes commit murder in order to receive the death penalty. They believed murder followed by repentance would allow them to end their life while avoiding damnation.

== See also ==
- Crime of passion
- Mass murder
- Mass shooting
- School shooting
- Serial killer
- Spree killer
- Shinjū
- Suicide attack
- Suicide by pilot
- Kamikaze
