= EgyptAir Flight 990 =

1999 aircraft crash in the Atlantic Ocean

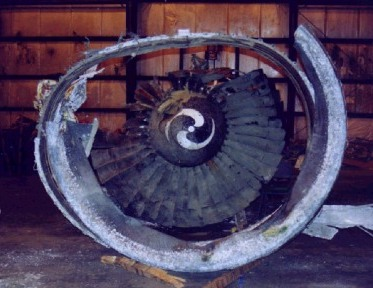
- The aircraft's left engine after being recovered from the Atlantic Ocean

Occurrence
- Date: October 31, 1999
- Summary: Steep descent from cruise altitude; resulting in in-flight break up, cause disputed
- Site: Georges Bank, Atlantic Ocean, 100 km (62 mi; 54 nmi) south of Nantucket; 40°20′51″N 69°45′24″W

Aircraft
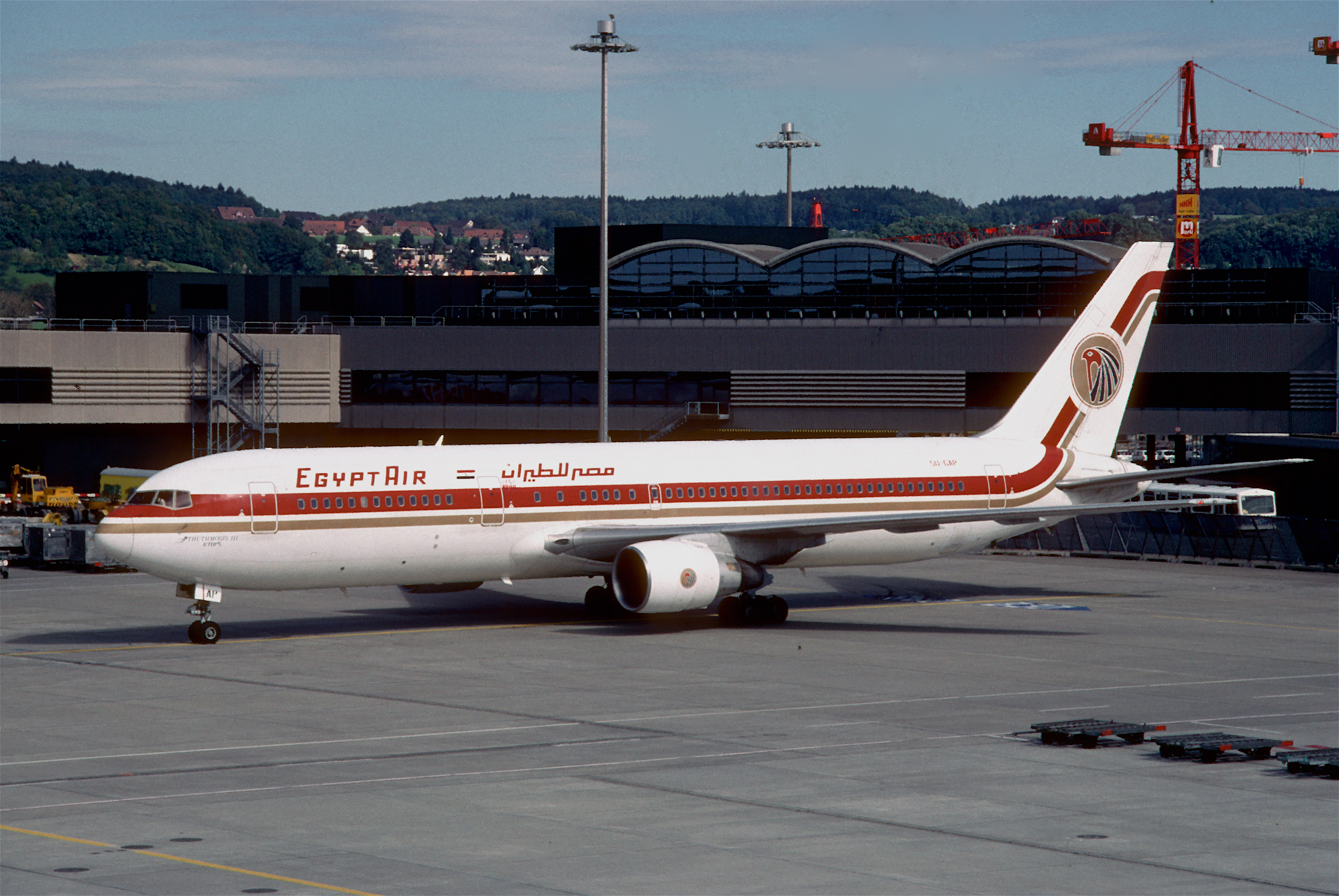
- SU-GAP, the aircraft involved, pictured 11 days before the crash
- Aircraft type: Boeing 767-366ER
- Aircraft name: Thuthmosis III
- Operator: EgyptAir
- IATA flight No.: MS990
- ICAO flight No.: MSR990
- Call sign: EGYPTAIR 990
- Registration: SU-GAP
- Flight origin: Los Angeles International Airport, California, United States
- Stopover: John F. Kennedy International Airport, New York, United States
- Destination: Cairo International Airport, Cairo, Egypt
- Occupants: 217
- Passengers: 203
- Crew: 14
- Fatalities: 217
- Survivors: 0

EgyptAir Flight 990 was a scheduled flight from Los Angeles International Airport to Cairo International Airport, with a stop at John F. Kennedy International Airport, New York City. On October 31, 1999, the Boeing 767 operating the route crashed into the Atlantic Ocean about 60 miles (100 km) south of Nantucket Island, Massachusetts, killing all 217 passengers and crew on board, making it the deadliest aviation disaster for EgyptAir. Since the crash occurred in international waters, it was investigated by the Egyptian Ministry of Civil Aviation's Civil Aviation Agency (ECAA) and the American National Transportation Safety Board (NTSB) under International Civil Aviation Organization rules. Since the ECAA lacked the resources of the NTSB, the Egyptian government asked the American government to have the NTSB handle the investigation.

Two weeks after the crash, the NTSB proposed that it hand the investigation over to the United States Federal Bureau of Investigation (FBI), as all of the evidence that they had collected up until that point suggested that a criminal act had taken place, and that the crash was the result of an intentional act. The Egyptian authorities refused to accept this idea, and repeatedly declined the proposal to hand the investigation over to the FBI. As a result, the NTSB was forced to continue the investigation alone, despite it falling outside their investigative purview.

The NTSB found that the cause of the accident was the airplane's departure from normal cruise flight and subsequent impact with the Atlantic Ocean "as a result of the relief first officer's flight control inputs". However they were ultimately unable to determine any specific reason for his alleged actions. The ECAA independently concluded that the incident was caused by mechanical failure of the aircraft's elevator control system. The Egyptian report suggested several possibilities for the cause of the accident, focusing on the possible failure of one of the right elevator's power control units. However, the NTSB continues to dispute the findings of the ECAA report, claiming that there is no possible explanation for the flight's final movements, other than an intentional human act.

== Background ==
=== Aircraft ===
The aircraft involved was a Boeing 767-366ER, serial number 24542, registered as SU-GAP, named Thuthmosis III after a pharaoh from the 18th Dynasty. The aircraft had logged approximately 33,219 airframe hours and 7,556 takeoff and landing cycles. The aircraft, a stretched, extended-range version of the standard 767, was the 282nd 767 built. It was delivered to EgyptAir as a new aircraft on September 26, 1989, and was equipped with two Pratt & Whitney PW4060 engines.

=== Cockpit crew ===
Flight 990's cockpit crew consisted of 57-year-old Captain Ahmed El-Habashi, 36-year-old First Officer Adel Anwar, who had switched assignments with another pilot so he could return home in time for his wedding, 52-year-old relief Captain Raouf Nour El Din, 59-year-old relief First Officer Gameel Al-Batouti, and the airline's chief pilot for the Boeing 767, Captain Hatem Rushdy. Captain El-Habashi was a veteran pilot who had been with EgyptAir for 36 years and had accumulated about 14,400 total flight hours, more than 6,300 of which were on the 767. Relief First Officer Al-Batouti had close to 5,200 flight hours in the 767 and a total of roughly 12,500 hours.

Because of the 10-hour scheduled flight time, the flight required two complete flight crews, each consisting of one captain and one first officer. EgyptAir designated one crew as the "active crew" and the other as the "cruise crew", sometimes also referred to as the "relief crew". While no formal procedure specified when each crew flew the aircraft, the active crew customarily made the takeoff and flew the first four to five hours of the flight. The cruise crew then assumed control of the aircraft until about one to two hours before landing, when the active crew returned to the cockpit and assumed control of the aircraft. EgyptAir designated the captain of the active crew as the pilot-in-command of the flight.

While the cruise crew was intended to take over far into the flight, relief first officer Al-Batouti entered the cockpit and recommended that he relieve command first officer Anwar 20 minutes after takeoff. Anwar initially protested, but eventually relented.

=== Passengers ===
Nation	Number
United States	100
Egypt	89
Canada	21
Syria	3
Sudan	2
Germany	1
Zimbabwe	1
Total	217

The flight was carrying 203 passengers from seven countries: Canada, Egypt, Germany, Sudan, Syria, the United States, and Zimbabwe. Of the 217 people on board, 100 were American, 89 were Egyptian (75 passengers, 14 crew), 21 were Canadian, and seven were of other nationalities. 54 of the American passengers (of whom many were elderly) were booked with the tour group Grand Circle Travel for a 14-day trip to Egypt. Of the 203 passengers, 32 boarded in Los Angeles; the rest boarded in New York. Four were nonrevenue EgyptAir crew members. Included in the passenger manifest were 33 Egyptian military officers returning from a training exercise; among them were two brigadier generals, a colonel, a major, and four other air force officers. After the crash, newspapers in Cairo were prevented by censors from reporting the officers' presence on the flight.

== Flight details ==
At 1:20 am EST (06:20 UTC), the aircraft took off from JFK's runway 22R. At 1:44, the flight reached its cruising altitude of 33,000 feet. At 1:48, captain El-Habashi left the cockpit and went to the lavatory. During that time, relief first officer Al-Batouti was alone in the cockpit. At 1:48:39, he began to exclaim, "I rely on God," and, at 1:49:45, disengaged the autopilot. The autopilot-disengagement warning was not heard on the CVR, indicating that the autopilot was disengaged manually, (Note: Specifically, the autopilot was manually disengaged via the disconnect button on the yoke being pressed twice in half a second, or the autopilot switch on the instrument panel being moved.) and, for the next 10 seconds, the aircraft remained in straight and level flight.

=== First dive and recovery ===
At 1:49:53, the throttles of both engines were moved to idle, and, 1 second later, the aircraft entered an increasingly steep dive, resulting in weightlessness (zero-g) throughout the cabin. Despite this, the captain was able to fight the lack of gravity and re-enter the cockpit. The speed of the 767 was now dangerously close to the sound barrier, exceeding its design limits and beginning to weaken its airframe. At 1:50:19, the flight reached its maximum rate of descent, 39,000 feet (12,000 m) per minute. Between 1:50:21 and 1:50:23, as the captain began to pull back on his control column, relief first officer Al-Batouti moved the start levers for both engines from the "run" to the "cutoff" position, shutting off fuel flow to the engines. Immediately afterwards, the captain pushed both throttles to their maximum position, but this had no effect, due to the engines' fuel supply having been cut off. The captain then deployed the speedbrakes, which slowed the aircraft's dive, bringing it back to a safer speed. Without fuel, both engines then ran down to a stop, causing the aircraft to lose all electrical power, including to both flight recorders and the aircraft's transponder. The flight's last secondary radar signal was received at 1:50:34. The Flight Data Recorder (FDR) stopped at 1:50:36; the Cockpit Voice Recorder (CVR) stopped at 1:50:38, approximately when the aircraft pulled out of the first dive.

=== Climb, second dive, and crash ===
After the flight recorders stopped, all that is known from this point on is based on primary radar returns from the aircraft (produced by the reflection of radar waves from its surface) and derived from the distribution of wreckage. Radar data indicated that, at approximately 1:50:38, the aircraft entered a steep climb, presumably due to the abrupt maneuvers made by the flightcrew to recover from the dive. Between 1:50:38 and 1:51:15, the 767 climbed from 16,000 feet (4,900 m) back to 25,000 feet (7,600 m), during which time its heading changed from 80° to 140°.

At 1:51:15, the aircraft entered another steep dive, with an average descent rate of around 20,000 feet (6,100 m) per minute. At some point during the final descent, the left engine and some other small pieces of debris separated from the aircraft due to the extreme structural stresses produced during the dive. The stress placed on the airframe caused structural integrity to fail at approximately 10,000 feet. The aircraft sections impacted the ocean at approximately 1:52 am EST, with the last primary radar return from the aircraft being received at 1:52:05. All 217 people on board were killed.

=== Air traffic control ===
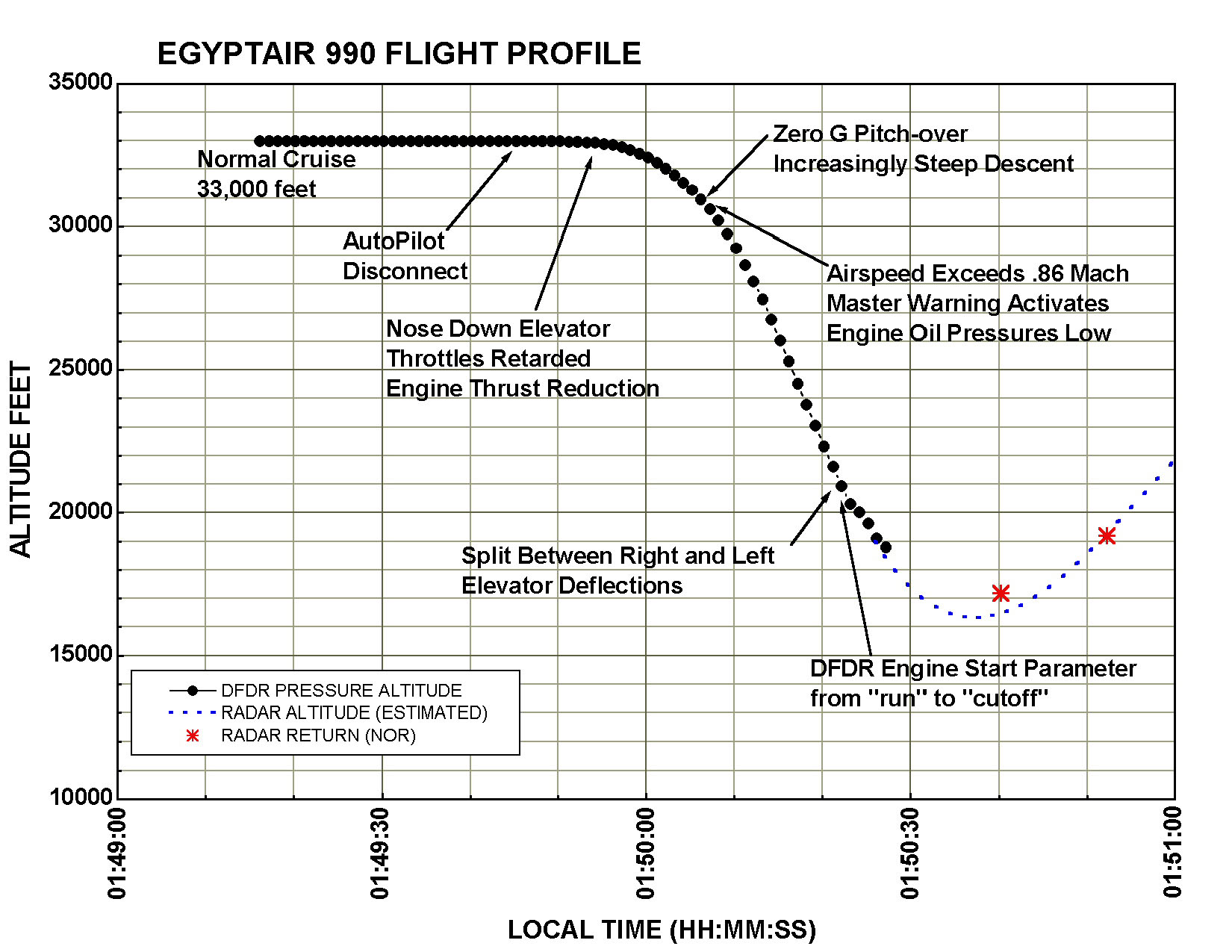
Flight profile of EgyptAir Flight 990 (source: NTSB)

US air traffic controllers provided transatlantic flight-control operations as a part of the New York Air Route Traffic Control Center (referred to in radio conversations simply as "Center" and abbreviated in the reports as "ZNY"). The airspace is divided into "areas", and "Area F" was the section that oversaw the airspace through which Flight 990 was flying. Transatlantic commercial air traffic travels via a system of routes called the North Atlantic Tracks, and Flight 990 was the only aircraft at the time assigned to fly North Atlantic Track Zulu. Also, a number of military operations areas are over the Atlantic, called "warning areas", which are also monitored by New York Center, but records show that these were inactive the night of the accident.

Interaction between ZNY and Flight 990 was completely routine. After takeoff, Flight 990 was handled by three different controllers as it climbed up in stages to its assigned cruising altitude. The aircraft, like all commercial airliners, was equipped with a Mode C transponder, which automatically reported the plane's altitude when queried by the ATC radar. At 01:44, the transponder indicated that Flight 990 had leveled off at FL330. Three minutes later, the controller requested that Flight 990 switch communications radio frequencies for better reception. A pilot on Flight 990 acknowledged on the new frequency. This was the last transmission received from the flight.

The records of the radar returns then indicate a sharp descent, with the plane dropping 14,600 ft (4,500 m) in 36 seconds before its last altitude report at 06:50:29 Coordinated Universal Time (UTC; 01:50:29 Eastern Standard Time). Several subsequent "primary" returns (simple radar reflections without the encoded Mode C altitude information) were received by ATC, the last being at 06:52:05. At 06:54, the ATC controller tried notifying Flight 990 that radar contact had been lost, but received no reply. Two minutes later, the controller contacted ARINC to determine if Flight 990 had switched to an oceanic frequency too early. ARINC attempted to contact Flight 990 on SELCAL, also with no response. The controller then contacted a nearby aircraft, Lufthansa Flight 499 (LH 499), a Boeing 747 en route from Mexico City to Frankfurt, and asked the flight's crew to try to raise Flight 990, but they were unable to make radio contact, although they also reported they were not receiving any emergency locator transmitter signals. Air France Flight 439, another Boeing 747 en route from Mexico City to Paris, was then asked to overfly the last known position of Flight 990, but that crew reported nothing out of the ordinary. Center also provided coordinates of Flight 990's last known position to Coast Guard rescue aircraft.

=== Flight recorders ===
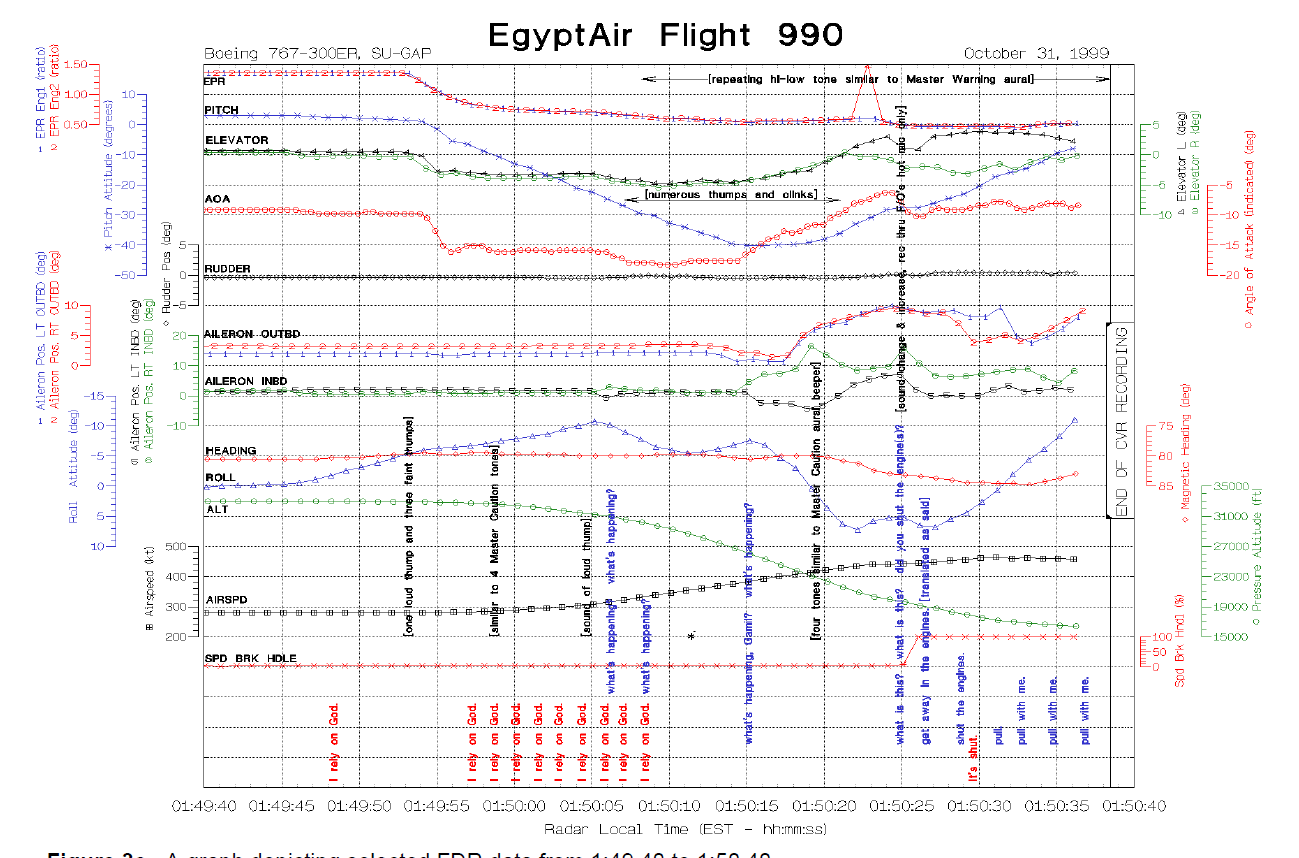
Readout of flight data recorder (with portions of the cockpit voice recorder transcript) from EgyptAir Flight 990 by the NTSB (Source: NTSB)

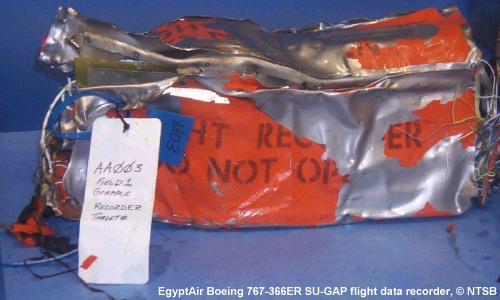
The damaged flight recorder of SU-GAP

The cockpit voice recorder (CVR) recorded the captain excusing himself to go to the lavatory, followed 30 seconds later by the first officer saying in Egyptian Arabic, "Tawakkalt `ala Allah" (Arabic: توكلت على الله), which can be translated as "I put my trust in God" or "I rely on God". A minute later, the autopilot was disengaged, immediately followed by the first officer again repeating the same Arabic phrase. Three seconds later, the throttles for both engines were reduced to idle, and both elevators were moved 3° nose down. The first officer repeated "I put my trust in God" seven more times before the captain suddenly asked repeatedly, "What's happening, what's happening?" The flight data recorder (FDR) reflected that the elevators then moved into a split condition, with the left elevator up and the right elevator down, a condition that is expected to result when the two control columns are subjected to at least 50 pounds-force (220 newtons) of opposing force. At this point, both engines were shut down by moving the start levers from run to cutoff. The captain asked, "What is this? What is this? Did you shut the engines?" The captain is then recorded as saying, "get away in the engines" (this is the literal translation that appears in the NTSB transcript), followed by "shut the engines". The first officer replies "It's shut". The final recorded words are the captain repeatedly stating, "Pull with me" but the FDR data indicated that the elevator surfaces remained in a split condition (with the left surface commanding nose up and the right surface commanding nose down) until the FDR and CVR stopped recording. No other aircraft were in the area, and no indication was given that an explosion occurred on board. The engines operated normally for the entire flight until they were shut down. From the presence of a western debris field about 1,200 ft (370 m) from the eastern debris field, the NTSB concluded that the left engine and some small pieces of wreckage separated from the aircraft before water impact.

== Search-and-rescue operations ==
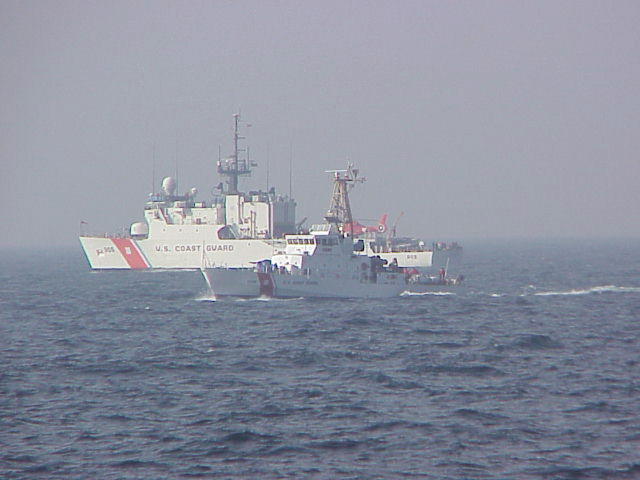
The U.S. Coast Guard cutters Monomoy (WPB-1326) (foreground) and Spencer (WMEC-905) searching for survivors of the crash.

The aircraft crashed in international waters, so the Egyptian government had the right to initiate its own search and rescue and investigation. Because the government did not have the resources to salvage the aircraft, the Egyptian government requested that the United States lead the investigation. The Egyptian government signed a letter formally ceding responsibility of investigating the accident to the United States.

Search-and-rescue operations were launched within minutes of the loss of radar contact, with the bulk of the operation being conducted by the United States Coast Guard. At 03:00 EST, an HU-25 Falcon jet took off from Air Station Cape Cod, becoming the first rescue party to reach the last known position of the plane. All U.S. Coast Guard cutters in the area were immediately diverted to search for the aircraft, and an urgent marine information broadcast was issued, requesting mariners in the area to keep a lookout for the downed aircraft.

At sunrise, the United States Merchant Marine Academy training vessel T/V Kings Pointer found an oil sheen and some small pieces of debris. Rescue efforts continued by air and by sea, with a group of U.S. Coast Guard cutters covering 10,000 sq mi (26,000 km^{2}) on October 31, 1999, with the hope of locating survivors, but no bodies were recovered from the debris field.

The authorities at John F. Kennedy International Airport (JFK) used the Ramada Plaza JFK Hotel to house relatives and friends of the victims of the crash. Due to its similar role after several aircraft crashes, the Ramada became known as the "Heartbreak Hotel".

Eventually, most passengers were identified by DNA from fractured remains recovered from the debris field and the ocean floor. Atlantic Strike Team members brought two truckloads of equipment from Fort Dix, New Jersey, to Newport, Rhode Island, to set up an incident command post. Officials from the United States Navy and the U.S. National Oceanic and Atmospheric Administration (NOAA) were dispatched to join the command. The search-and-rescue operation was suspended on November 1, 1999, with the rescue vessels and aircraft moving instead to recovery operations.

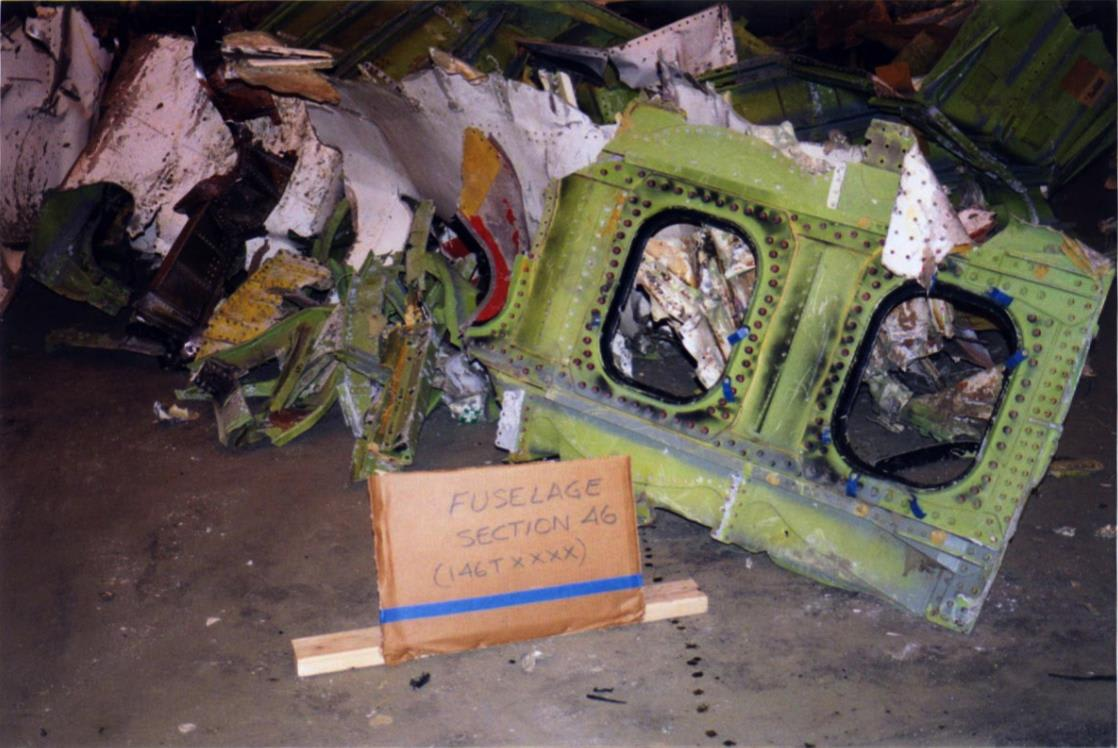
Fuselage section of Flight 990 recovered from the international waters

The U.S. Navy rescue and salvage ship USS Grapple (ARS-53), the U.S. Navy fleet ocean tug USNS Mohawk (T-ATF-170), and the NOAA survey ship NOAAS Whiting (S 329) arrived to take over salvage efforts, including recovery of the bulk of the wreckage from the seabed. The FDR and CVR were recovered within days by the U.S. Navy's Deep Drone III submersible. In total, a C-130 Hercules, an H-60 helicopter, the HU-25 Falcon, and the U.S. Coast Guard cutters USCGC Monomoy (WPB-1326), USCGC Spencer (WMEC-905), USCGC Reliance (WMEC-615), USCGC Bainbridge Island (WPB-1343), USCGC Juniper (WLB-201), USCGC Point Highland (WPB-82333), USCGC Chinook (WPB-87308), and USCGC Hammerhead, along with their supporting helicopters, participated in the search.

A second salvage effort was made in March 2000 that recovered the aircraft's second engine and some of the cockpit controls.

== Investigations ==
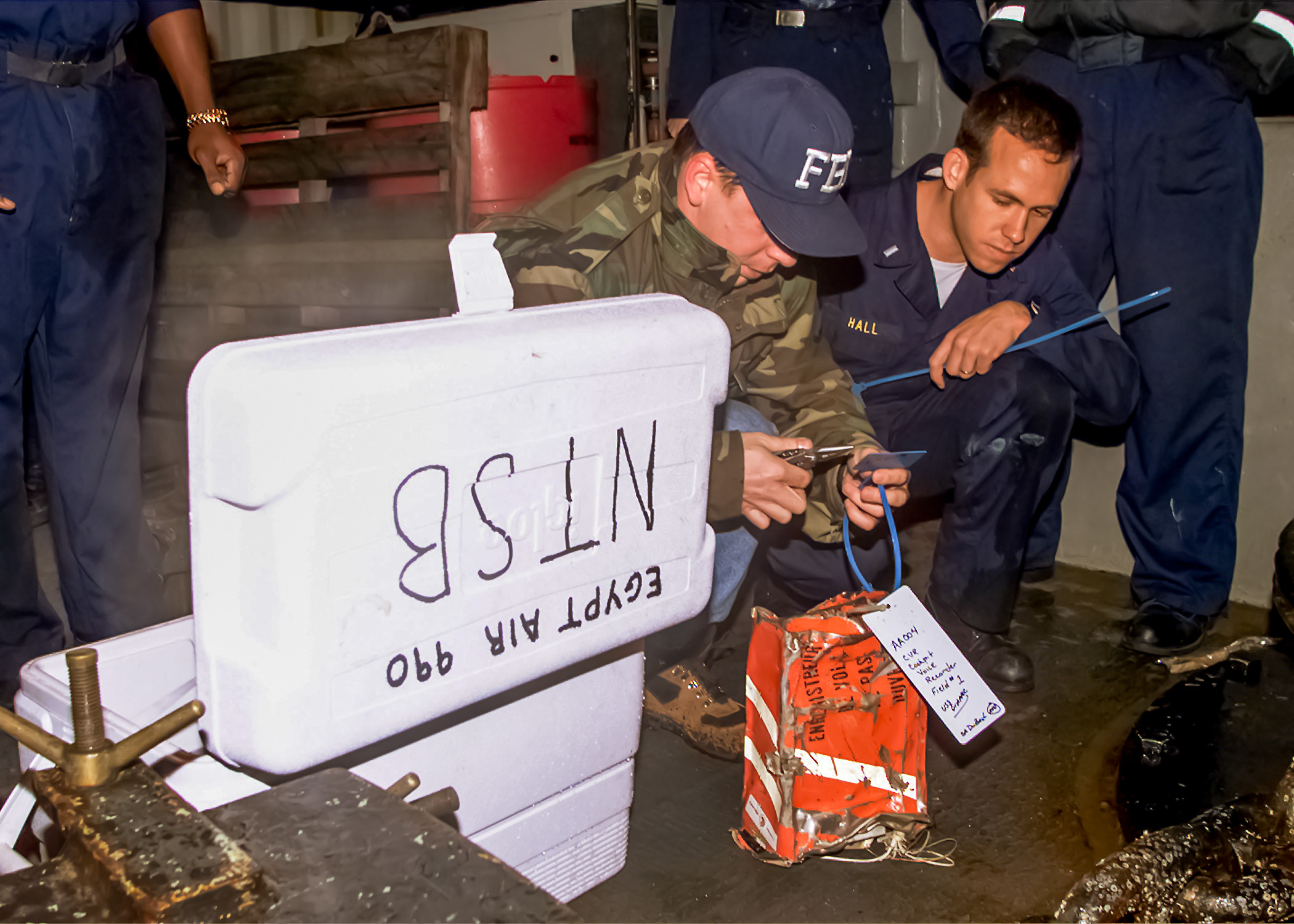
An FBI agent tags the cockpit voice recorder from EgyptAir Flight 990 on the deck of the USS Grapple (ARS 53) at the crash site on November 13, 1999

Under the International Civil Aviation Organization treaty, the investigation of an aircraft crash in international waters is under the jurisdiction of the country of registry of the aircraft. At the request of the Egyptian government, the US NTSB took the lead in this investigation, with the Egyptian Civil Aviation Authority (ECAA) participating. The investigation was supported by the Federal Aviation Administration, the Federal Bureau of Investigation, the United States Coast Guard, the US Department of Defense, NOAA, Boeing Commercial Airplanes, EgyptAir, and Pratt & Whitney Aircraft Engines.

Initially, there was speculation that the crash was related to the 1991 crash of Lauda Air Flight 004, which was caused by an uncommanded thrust reverser deployment, leading to a similar nose dive from cruising altitude. The two 767s involved were assembled back-to-back and had identical Pratt & Whitney PW4000 engines.

Two weeks after the crash, the NTSB proposed declaring the crash a criminal event and handing the investigation over to the FBI. Egyptian government officials protested, and Omar Suleiman, head of Egyptian intelligence, traveled to Washington to join the investigation.

=== Defection of Hamdi Hanafi Taha ===
In February 2000, EgyptAir 767 captain Hamdi Hanafi Taha sought political asylum in London after landing his aircraft there. In his statement to British authorities, he claimed to have knowledge of the circumstances behind the crash of Flight 990. Taha attested that first officer Gameel Al-Batouti had intentionally crashed the plane to exact revenge on an airline executive, who had recently demoted Al-Batouti, and happened to be on board. Taha also is reported to have said that he wanted to "stop all lies about the disaster," and to put much of the blame on EgyptAir management.

Osama El-Baz, an adviser to Egyptian President Hosni Mubarak, said, "This pilot can't know anything about the plane; the chances that he has any information [about the crash of Flight 990] are very slim." EgyptAir officials also immediately dismissed Taha's claim. American investigators confirmed key aspects of Taha's information, but decided not to anger the Egyptian government further by issuing any official statement about Al-Batouti's motive. EgyptAir terminated Taha's employment, and his application for British asylum was reportedly declined, though he gave an extensive 2002 newspaper interview in London and was featured in a 2005 documentary.

=== NTSB investigation and conclusion ===
NTSB's file of photographs of the wreckage recovered from the crash

Photographs of the engines and associated debris after they were recovered

The NTSB investigation centered on the actions of the relief first officer, Gameel Al-Batouti. The NTSB determined that the only way for the observed split elevator condition to occur was if the left seat pilot (the captain's position) was commanding nose up while the right seat pilot (the first officer's position) commanded nose down. As the Egyptian investigation forwarded various mechanical failure scenarios, they were each tested by the NTSB and found not to match the factual evidence. The NTSB concluded that no mechanical failure scenario either they or the Egyptian investigation could come up with matched the evidence on the ground, and that even if mechanical failure was a factor, the 767's design would have made the situation recoverable.

The NTSB's final report was issued on March 21, 2002, after a two-year investigation. The NTSB concluded that the probable cause of the crash was the relief first officer's actions, but it did not determine the reason for those actions.

From the NTSB report's "Summary" section:

1. The accident airplane's nose-down movements did not result from a failure in the elevator control system or any other airplane failure.

2. The accident airplane's movements during the initial part of the accident sequence were the result of the relief first officer's manipulation of the controls.

3. The accident airplane's movements after the command captain returned to the cockpit were the result of both pilots' inputs, including opposing elevator inputs where the relief first officer continued to command nose-down and the captain commanded nose-up elevator movements.

From the NTSB report's "Probable Cause" section:

The National Transportation Safety Board determines that the probable cause of the EgyptAir flight 990 accident is the airplane's departure from normal cruise flight and subsequent impact with the Atlantic Ocean as a result of the relief first officer's flight control inputs. The reason for the relief first officer's actions was not determined.

=== ECAA investigation and conclusion ===
After formally ceding responsibility for the investigation of the accident to the NTSB, the Egyptian authorities became increasingly unhappy with the direction the investigation was heading, and launched their own investigation in the weeks following the accident. The ECAA report concluded that "the Relief First Officer did not deliberately dive the airplane into the ocean" and that mechanical failure was "a plausible and likely cause of the accident".

William Langewiesche, an aviation journalist, said: "[I]n the case of the Egyptians, they were following a completely different line of thinking. It seemed to me that they knew very well that their man, Batouti, had done this. They were pursuing a political agenda that was driven by the need to answer to their higher-ups in a very pyramidal, autocratic political structure. The word had been passed down from on high, probably from Mubarak himself, that there was no way that Batouti, the co-pilot, could have done this. For the accident investigators in Egypt, the game then became not pursuing the truth, but backing the official line."

=== Responses to reports ===
The NTSB investigation and its results drew criticism from the Egyptian government, which advanced several alternative theories about mechanical malfunction of the aircraft. The theories proposed by Egyptian authorities were tested by the NTSB, but none was found to match the facts. For example, an elevator assembly hardover (in which the elevator in a fully extended position sticks because the hinge catches on the tail frame) proposed by the Egyptians was discounted because the flight recorder data showed the elevator was in a "split condition". In this state, one side of the elevator is up and the other down; on the 767, this condition is only possible through flight control input (i.e., one yoke is pushed forward, the other pulled backward).

Some evidence indicated that one of the right elevator's power control units may have suffered a malfunction, and the Egyptian investigation mentioned this as a likely cause of the crash. While noting that the damage did indeed exist, the NTSB countered that it was more likely a result of the crash rather than a pre-existing problem, as the 767 is designed to remain airworthy even with two PCUs failed.

== Media coverage ==
While the official investigation was proceeding, speculation about the crash ran rampant in both Western and Egyptian media.

=== Western media speculation ===
Long before the NTSB issued its final report, Western media began to speculate about the meaning of the recorded cockpit conversations and about possible motives – including suicide and terrorism – behind Al-Batouti's actions on the flight. The speculation, in part, was based on leaks from an unnamed federal law-enforcement official that the crew member in the co-pilot's seat was recorded as saying, "I made my decision now. I put my faith in God's hands."

During a press conference held on November 19, 1999, NTSB chairman Jim Hall denounced such speculation, and said that it had "done a disservice to the long-standing friendship between the people of the United States of America and Egypt."

On November 20, 1999, the Associated Press quoted senior American officials as saying that the quotation was not in fact on the recording. It is believed that the speculation arose from a mistranslation (or rather misguided paraphrase) of the Egyptian Arabic phrase Tawakkalt ‘ala Allāh meaning "I rely on God."

London's Sunday Times, quoting unnamed sources, speculated that the relief first officer had been "traumatized by war," and was depressed because many members of his fighter squadron in the 1973 war had been killed.

The unprecedented presence of 33 members of the Egyptian general staff on the flight (contrary to standard operating procedure) fed a number of conspiracy theories. Some opined that it was an action (and potentially a conspiracy) of Muslim extremists against Egypt. Others countered that Mossad had targeted them.

=== Egyptian media reaction and speculation ===
The Egyptian media reacted with outrage to the speculations in the Western press. The state-owned Al Ahram Al Misri called Al-Batouti a "martyr", and the Islamist Al Shaab covered the story under a headline that stated, "America's goal is to hide the truth by blaming the EgyptAir pilot."

At least two Egyptian newspapers, Al Gomhuria and Al-Musawar, offered theories that the aircraft was accidentally shot down by the US. Other theories were advanced by the Egyptian press, as well, including the Islamist Al Shaab, which speculated that a Mossad/CIA conspiracy was to blame (since, supposedly, EgyptAir and El Al crews stayed at the same hotel in New York). Al Shaab also accused US officials of secretly recovering the FDR, reprogramming it, and throwing it back into the water to be publicly recovered.

Unifying all the Egyptian press was a stridently held belief that "it is inconceivable that a pilot would kill himself by crashing a jet with 217 people aboard. 'It is not possible that anyone who would commit suicide would also kill so many innocent people alongside him,' said Ehab William, a surgeon at Cairo's Anglo-American Hospital."

The Egyptian media also reacted against Western speculation of terrorist connections. The Cairo Times reported, "The deceased pilot's nephew has lashed out in particular against speculation that his uncle could have been a religious extremist. 'He loved the United States,' the nephew said. 'If you wanted to go shopping in New York, he was the man to speak to, because he knew all the stores.'"

=== Reaction of the Egyptian public ===
William Langewiesche, an author, journalist, and aviator, said that in Cairo, he encountered three groups of people. He said that the ordinary Cairenes believed that an American conspiracy existed to attack EgyptAir 990 and that the Americans were covering up the facts. He added that a small group of Cairenes, mostly consisting of "intelligentsia", "knew perfectly well that Batouti, the co-pilot, had pushed that airplane into the water, and that the Egyptian government was stonewalling and was engaged in what they saw as a typical exercise in Egyptian governing." Langewiesche said that "people involved directly in the investigation" had "presented a uniform party line, a uniform face with very few cracks. They stonewalled me, and that in itself was very interesting." Langewiesche argued that "in the stonewalling, they were revealing themselves" and that if they truly believed Batouti were innocent, they would have invited Langewiesche to see proof of this theory.

== Aftermath ==
After the crash, on November 14, 1999, the airline changed the flight number for the JFK to Cairo route from MS990 to MS986, with the outbound changing from MS989 to MS985. The service to Los Angeles was suspended for twenty-five years. When flights between Los Angeles and Cairo resumed on May 23, 2026 on a direct flight using a Airbus A350-900, the flight number was changed to MS984. As of 2025, Flight 986 was being operated using a Boeing 777-300ER, and had a midday departure time (compared with the nighttime departure of Flight 990).

As of right now, MSR986 is currently operated with an Airbus A350-900

A monument to EgyptAir Flight 990 is in the Island Cemetery in Newport, Rhode Island.

Documents seized during Operation Neptune Spear included a few notes, handwritten by Osama bin Laden in September 2002, with the heading "The Birth of the Idea of September 11". In these notes, bin Laden describes how he was inspired by the crash of EgyptAir Flight 990: "This is how the idea of 9/11 was conceived and developed in my head, and that is when we began the planning".

== In popular culture ==
Al Jazeera, an Arabic-language channel sponsored by Qatar, produced a documentary by Yosri Fouda about the flight that was broadcast in March 2000. The documentary looked at the preliminary NTSB conclusion and speculations surrounding it. In the documentary, the NTSB data were used with a flight simulator of the same aircraft model to try to reconstruct the circumstances of the crash, but the simulator failed three times to replicate the NTSB theory for plunging a fully functioning 767 from 33,000 ft (10,000 m) to 19,000 ft (5,800 m) in 37 seconds. However, a 2001 journalist describes how he successfully reproduced the incident in a Boeing flight simulator.

The events of Flight 990 were featured in "Death and Denial", a season 3 (2005) episode of the Canadian TV series Mayday (called Air Emergency and Air Disasters in the U.S. and Air Crash Investigation in the UK and elsewhere around the world). The episode was broadcast with the title "EgyptAir 990" in the United Kingdom, Australia, and Asia.

In response to the ECAA's claim of NTSB unprofessionalism, former NTSB director of aviation safety Bernard Loeb stated:

What was unprofessional was the insistence by the Egyptians, in the face of irrefutable evidence, to anyone who knows anything about investigating airplane accidents and who knows anything about aerodynamics and airplanes, was the fact that this airplane was intentionally flown into the ocean. No scenario that the Egyptians came up with, or that we came up with, in which there were some sort of mechanical failure in the elevator control system, would either match the flight profile or was a situation in which the airplane was not recoverable.

The Mayday dramatization of the crash was based on ATC tapes, as well as the CVR recordings. In interviews conducted for the program, the relief first officer's family members vehemently disputed the suicide and deliberate crash theories, and dismissed them as biased. The program nevertheless concluded that Al-Batouti crashed the plane for personal reasons; he had been severely reprimanded by his supervisor for sexual harassment after allegedly "exposing himself to teenaged girls and propositioning hotel guests", and the supervisor was on board the plane when it was brought down.

This dramatization also depicts the relief first officer forcing the plane down while the command captain attempts to pull the plane up. Despite this, upon conclusion, the program stresses the official NTSB conclusion and the fact it makes no mention of a suicide mission. Rather, it simply states that the crash was a direct result of actions made by the co-pilot for reasons "not determined".

== See also ==
- Aviation safety
- List of declared or suspected pilot suicides
- Boeing 767 § Accidents and incidents
- List of accidents and incidents involving airliners by location § Atlantic Ocean
- List of accidents and incidents involving commercial aircraft
- List of aircraft accidents and incidents resulting in at least 50 fatalities
- List of disasters in Massachusetts by death toll

Specific incidents

- SilkAir Flight 185, another disputed crash involving pilot suicide
- Germanwings Flight 9525
- Japan Airlines Flight 350
- LAM Mozambique Airlines Flight 470
- Malaysia Airlines Flight 370
- Royal Air Maroc Flight 630
- 2018 Horizon Air Bombardier Q400 incident
