= Mental health in aviation =

Mental health in aviation is a major concern among airlines, regulators, and passengers. This topic gained more attention after the 2015 Germanwings crash, which was deliberately caused by the plane's copilot. Little data exists on mental health in aviation, but steps to gather relevant information and provide better solutions are underway.

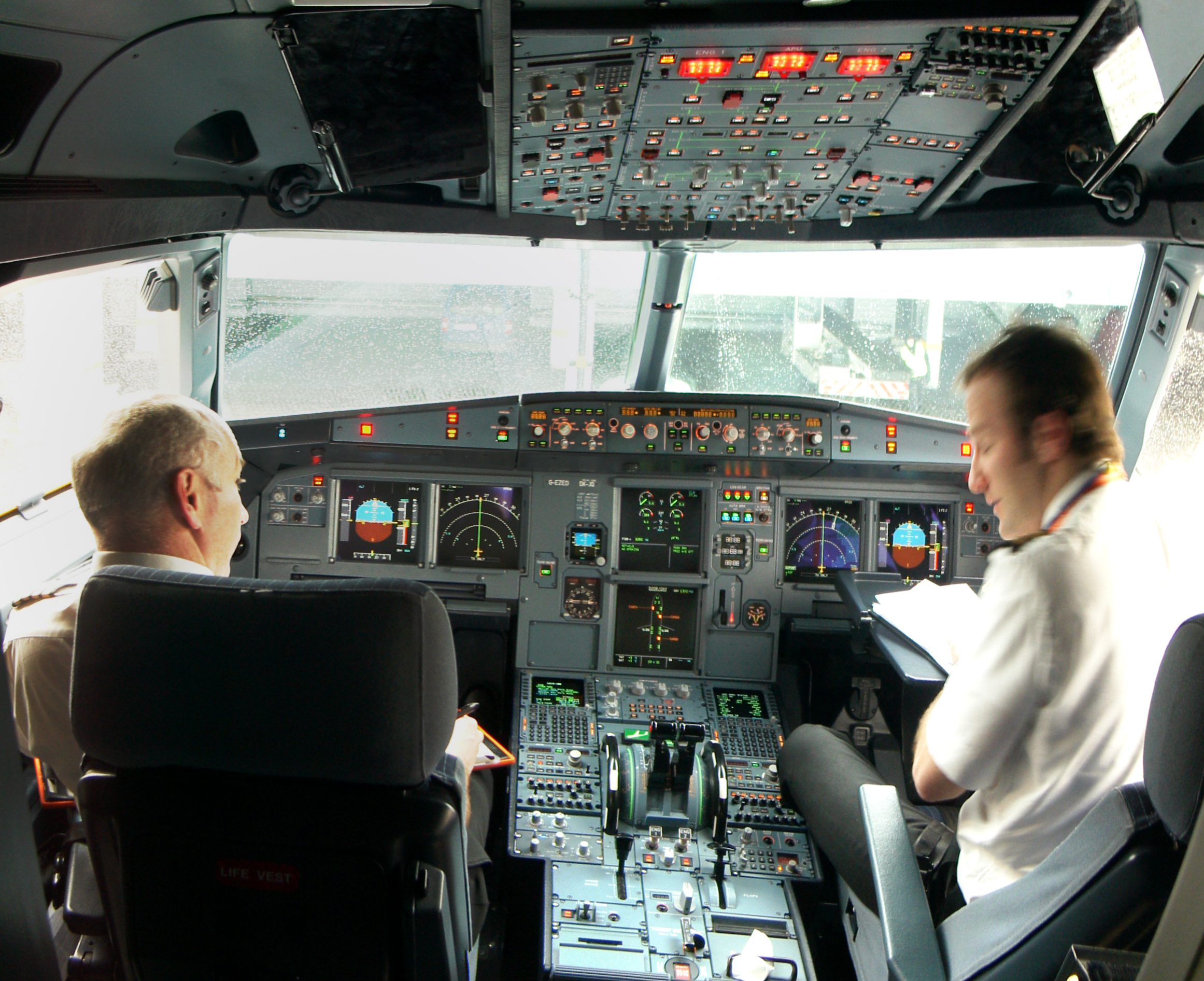
The life of an airline pilot can be stressful and demanding. Following events such as the 2015 Germanwings crash, mental health in aviation is gaining attention within the aviation industry.

It should be mentioned that while much of the conversation about mental health in aviation is centered around pilots, this issue extends to other occupations in aviation.

== Prevalence of disorders ==
A study of 809 Brazilian pilots found that between 6.7 and 12% had a common mental disorder. For pilots with a heavy workload, this figure increased to 23.7%. Mental health problems are present in aviation, just like in any other industry, and it is important to have a wide variety of tests and screening processes to determine the true wellness of pilots.

A 2016 study in the United States vetted by Harvard University revealed that of 3485 pilots across North and South America, Europe, Asia and Oceania, 233 pilots or 12.6% met the threshold to be diagnosed with depression as defined by the DSM-5.

Mental illness is second to cardiovascular disease in reasons for losing an aviation license. As a result, many pilots on anti-depressant drugs withhold this information from the governing body of aviation in their country due to fear of losing their license. Detection is further complicated by the fact that few medical examiners fully understand the complexity and effects of the different disorders. Additionally, psychiatrists are unfamiliar with the regulations of pilots suffering from mental health issues. Even though pilots need to have their medical license renewed every 6 months by a certified medical examiner, there is little focus on mental health and no psychologist or psychiatrist follows up unless requested to do so by the pilot, which is rarely the case.

Airlines are familiar with the consequences of mental illness, which is why they administer personality tests during the selection process in order to identify any mental health issues. One example is the Minnesota Multiphasic Personality Inventory (MMPI). This long questionnaire can identify at risk candidates by asking a series of questions, worded differently, all around a similar subject. However, because of the stigma in the aviation industry around mental illness, pilots tend to be extremely defensive about their results and may feel pressured to hide any signs of mental health issues.

== Causes ==
During the course of a pilot's career, the prominence of mental illness becomes an even bigger issue as the stresses of the occupation accumulate. Pilots are exposed to difficult working conditions that feature inconsistent schedules, extended periods away from home, and frequent encounters with fatigue.

Mental illness is amplified by the lack of social support from home, a varying circadian rhythm, and the excessive job demands. Experts and airlines have been aware of these issues from as early as 1985, yet very little information about mental health in aviation exists. There is a macho attitude towards mental health in aviation, with a laissez-faire approach.

Both males and females in aviation are equally susceptible to mental health issues.

There is a negative stigma around mental health in aviation. A study showed that pilots assumed fellow pilots who were unsociable most likely have a mental health illness. This identifies that even factors that are not signs of mental health can stigmatize others and the negative consequences of being identified as having mental health issues, even when this is not the case.

== Solutions ==
Pilots and their employers must also be aware of recent life changes that may affect pilot performance and mental health characteristics. One such way is the Recent Life Change Questionnaire, which measures how susceptible someone is to change. This questionnaire identifies certain individuals who are more at risk of mental health issues and allows the airline to then provide support for them. It is crucial for airlines to develop a program to remove individuals who are in a high risk state and help them transition to a more suitable job. Regulators are also considering implementing random psychological screenings to pilots, however it has been suggested that this will not be foolproof in eliminating mental health issues within pilots. The Federal Aviation Administration also announced that it will conduct research into newer and more relevant data concerning mental health within pilots. It is equally important for pilots to feel open about their mental health and not be afraid of losing their career. This can be accomplished by removing the stigma associated with mental health, encourage self-reporting, and having companies work with pilots to help them find other aviation jobs and provide wellness centers.

Throughout the hiring phase, pilots can be administered different personality tests to see if they are at risk of mental health issues.

Following the Germanwings Flight 9525, both the IATA and the Civil Aviation Medical Association are looking into solutions, one being random psychological tests. The issue with a reactive instead of proactive method, is that rather than supporting pilots, it creates an even bigger stigma within the industry. The European Aviation Safety Agency also issued a similar statement, stating all pilots need to undergo psychological evaluation.

== See also ==
- Aviation safety
- Mental health
- Suicide by pilot
