= John Verrept =

Belgian aviator (1887–1912)

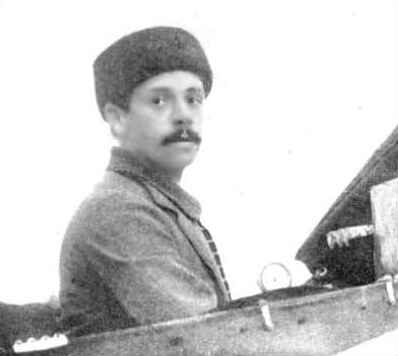
- Verrept in 1912
- Born: 12 April 1887; Lier, Belgium
- Died: 17 April 1912 (aged 25); Châteaufort, France

John Verrept (12 April 1887 – 17 April 1912) was a Belgian aviation pioneer. He was world altitude record holder with two passengers. He was the first person in history to commit suicide with an airplane on 17 April 1912.

Verrept was also a founding member of Lierse S.K..

== Biography ==
=== Early life ===
Verrept was born on 12 April 1887 in Lier as the son of Petrus Hendricus Verrept and Adelina Van Eeckhoven. His father owned a shipyard.

=== Career and death ===
Verrept obtained his pilot's license 18 April 1911 at the Blériot flying school in Pau, France. Verrept had a monoplane with an engine of 70 kg, 50 hp and a weighed 180 kg. He successfully participating in the Paris-Madrid flight. As a result of that achievement, Lier organized a flying event on 30 and 31 July 1911. In January 1912 he accompanied aviators Jules Tyck and Jonckheere during their first part of their trip to the United States. On 20 January 1912 he broke the world altitude record with two passengers. He flew up to 1075 metres (3500 feet) from Vidamée near Senlis, beating the former record of 896 metres by René Moineau. From early 1912 he was flying instructor at flying school "Borel" in Buc.

A day after an argument with his fiance Alice Mathis he committed suicide in Châteaufort near Versailles on 17 April 1912. At 5am (local time) in the morning he left his house with a photograph of his girlfriend on his heart and told her that he was going to commit suicide. He flew with his plane to an altitude of 500 metres (1640 feet) where he flew for around 45 minutes. He descended to 200 metres (656 feet), let go of his handlebars, and raised his arms in the air. On the ground he was still alive but his skull was crushed and limbs torn off. He died in the hospital in Versaille. When his fiance saw his body in the hospital, she asked for forgiveness, and said "Poor John, I never thought you would do this and it was my fault". It was the first aircraft-assisted suicide in history. He was buried with great interest on 22 April at the Mechelsesteenweg.

== Lierse S.K. ==
Verrept was one of the founding members of football club Lierse S.K. and also played one year himself. In 1914 a youth trophy was named after him.
