= Suicide by aircraft =

Aviation disaster in which a pilot intentionally crashes the aircraft

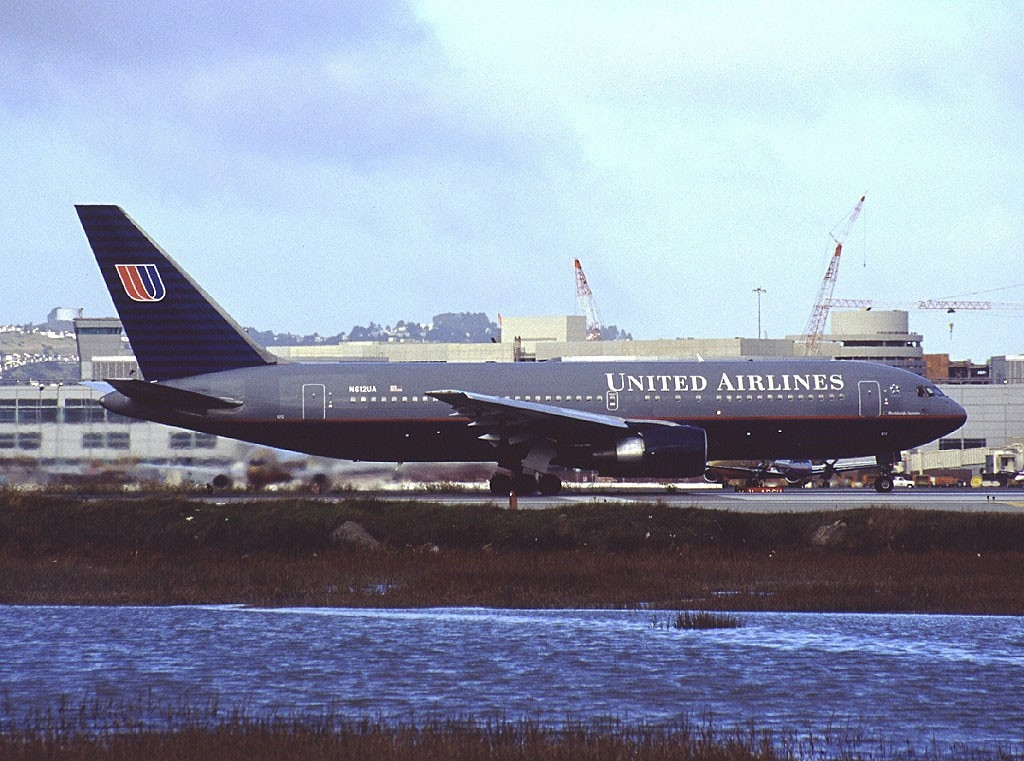
This Boeing 767-200, operating as United Airlines Flight 175, was deliberately flown into the South Tower of the World Trade Center in New York by suicidal terrorists on September 11, 2001, killing all 65 people on board.

Suicide by aircraft or aircraft-assisted suicide is an aviation event in which a pilot or another person onboard deliberately crashes or attempts to crash an aircraft as an act of suicide, with or without the intention of causing harm to passengers on board or civilians on the ground. If others are killed, it may be considered an act of murder–suicide or mass murder. It has been confirmed as the cause in several commercial and private aircraft crashes. Determining a motive can be challenging and sometimes impossible for investigators to conclude, especially if the suspected pilot sabotages or disengages their in-flight recorder or in-flight tracker. Most cases of suicide by pilot involve general aviation in small aircraft, where the pilot is the sole occupant of the aircraft. In approximately half of these cases, the pilot had consumed drugs, often alcohol or antidepressants, which would typically result in a ban on flying. Many of these pilots concealed their mental illness histories from regulators.

Investigators do not classify aircraft incidents as suicides unless there is compelling evidence, which may include suicide notes, past suicide attempts, explicit threats of suicide, or a documented history of alcohol abuse, drug addiction, depression, or other forms of mental illness. One study analyzing pilot suicides between 2002 and 2013 identified eight cases as definite suicides, and five cases that may have been suicides. In some cases, investigators may collaborate with terrorism experts to investigate potential connections to extremist groups, aiming to ascertain whether the suicide was an act of terrorism.

A Bloomberg News study focusing on crashes involving Western-built commercial airliners, revealed that pilot murder-suicides ranked as the second most prevalent cause of airline crash deaths between 2011 and 2020. The study also found that such deaths increased over the period from 1991 to 2020, while deaths due to accidental causes significantly decreased.

== World War II suicide attacks ==
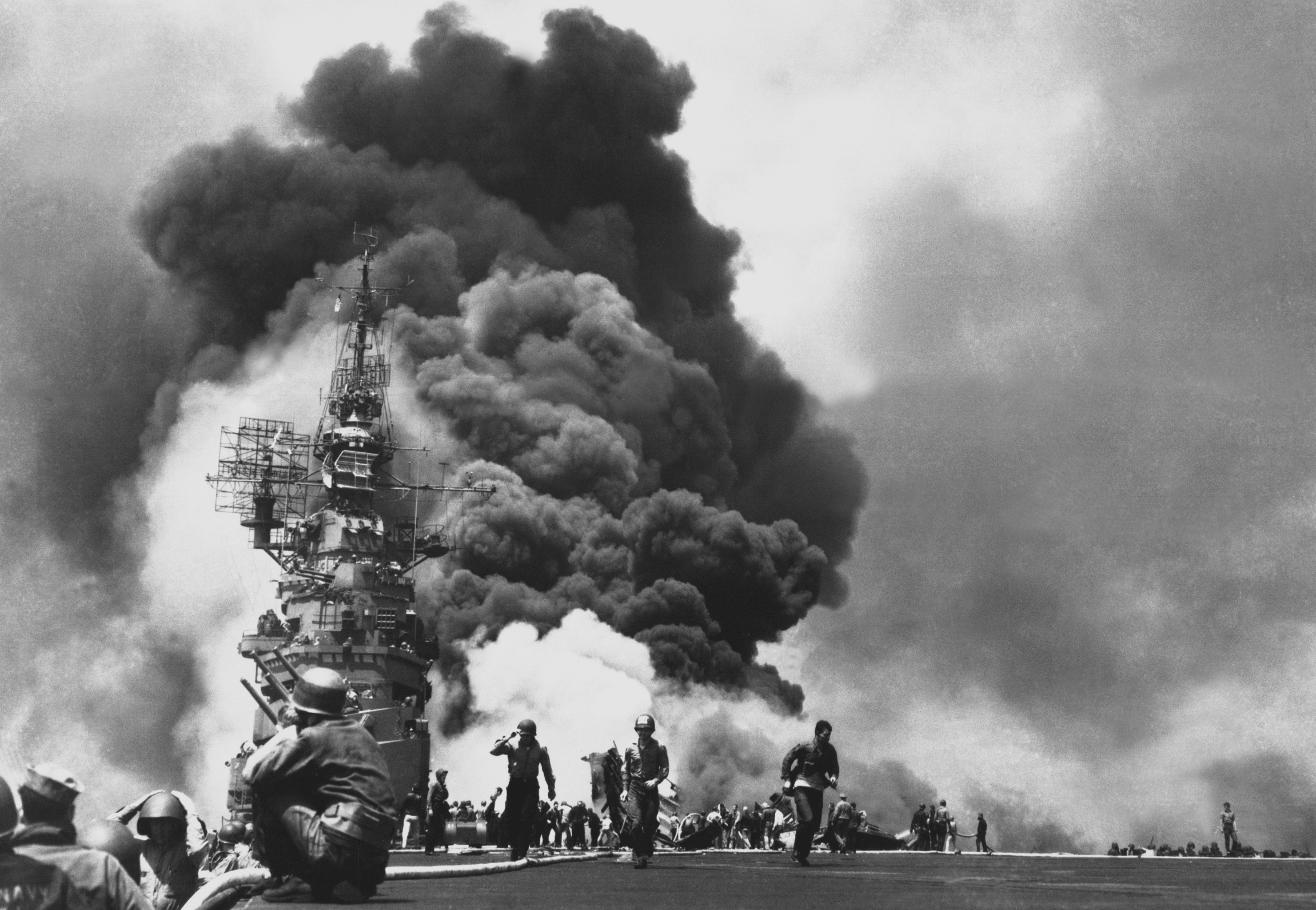
Impact of two kamikazes on USS Bunker Hill, May 11, 1945

During World War II, the Russian aviator Nikolai Gastello was the first Soviet pilot credited with a (later disputed) "fire taran" in a suicide attack by an aircraft on a ground target, although his aircraft had been shot down and was in a rapid partially controllable descent. Another early example took place during the attack on Pearl Harbor where First Lieutenant Fusata Iida, commander of the Japanese 3rd Air Group, told his men before taking off, that if his aircraft were to become badly damaged he would crash it into a "worthy enemy target".

In the following years there were more suicide attacks; the best known by military aviators are the attacks from the Empire of Japan, called kamikaze, against Allied naval vessels in the closing stages of the Pacific campaign of World War II. These attacks were designed to destroy warships more effectively than was possible with conventional attacks; between October 1944 and 1945, 3,860 kamikaze pilots died by suicide in this manner.

== List of declared or suspected aircraft suicides ==
This list excludes military and wartime suicide attacks on enemy targets (see section above).

=== By pilots in control of whole flight ===
Classification	Crash date	Flown by	Flight Type	Flight	Fatalities	Summary	Aircraft	Refs
Confirmed suicide	Mar 10, 1948	Pilot	General aviation	Stolen aircraft	1	Samuel A. Wong, a U.S. Air Force private wanted by Honolulu police for shooting his wife, stole a Piper J-3 Cub from the Haleiwa airfield and crashed it into the ocean off Makapuʻu Point on Oʻahu. Wong was the only person on the aircraft.		
Confirmed suicide	Sep 16, 1948	Pilot	General aviation	1948 Idlewild Airport incident	2	Jesus Meneau Monleon stabbed the passenger before shooting himself, causing the plane to lose control and crash into Jamaica Bay.		
Confirmed suicide	Dec 28, 1952	Pilot	General aviation	1952 Avenger Field crash	1	A 23-year-old crashed a plane into a gravel pit in Sweetwater, Texas, United States.		
Confirmed suicide	Mar 27, 1972	Pilot	General aviation	Stolen aircraft	1	Timofei Shovkunov crashed an Aeroflot Antonov An-2 into his own apartment in Voroshilovgrad. He was the only casualty.		
Confirmed suicide	Jul 31, 1973	Pilot	General aviation	1973 Cockshot Wood plane crash	1	Peter Martin flew his Beagle Pup into the ground in Cumberland, England.		
Confirmed suicide	Mar 23, 1976	Pilot	General aviation	1976 Tokyo suicide attack	1	Movie actor Mitsuyasu Maeno attempted a Kamikaze attack against right-wing political figure Yoshio Kodama in Tokyo using a rented Piper PA-28 Cherokee; Kodama survived unhurt.		
Confirmed suicide	Sep 26, 1976	Pilot	General aviation	Stolen aircraft	5 (pilot, 4 on the ground)	Vladimir Serkov attempted to pilot his Antonov An-2 plane into his ex-wife's parents' apartment in Novosibirsk where she and his two-year-old son were visiting; four residents were killed, but his wife survived. See An-2 incidents.		
Confirmed suicide	Jan 5, 1977	Pilot	General aviation	Connellan air disaster	5 (pilot, 4 on the ground)	Colin Richard Forman, a disgruntled former employee of Connellan Airways (Connair), flew a Beechcraft Baron into the Connair complex at the Alice Springs Airport, Northern Territory, Australia.		
Confirmed suicide	Mar 14, 1979	Pilot	Stolen commercial aircraft	Stolen aircraft	33 (pilot, 32 on the ground)	An aircraft mechanic working at Beijing Xijiao Airport stole a CAAC Hawker-Siddeley Trident and crashed it into a factory, killing 32. The motive is suspected to be revenge against the Chinese Air Force due the perceived unfair treatment he received during his service.		
Confirmed suicide	Aug 22, 1979	Pilot	Stolen commercial aircraft	Stolen aircraft	4 (pilot, 3 on the ground)	A 23-year-old aircraft mechanic working at Bogota El Dorado Airport stole a SATENA Hawker-Siddeley HS-748 and crashed it into a Bogota suburb, killing three.	Satena_Hawker_Siddeley_HS-748_FAC-1101_BOG_1979-07-26	
Confirmed suicide	Jun 1, 1980	Pilot	General aviation	Barra do Garças air disaster	7 (pilot, 4 passengers, 2 people on the ground)	Brazilian pilot Mauro Milhomem attempted to crash his Embraer EMB 721 Sertanejo, carrying four passengers, into a hotel owned by a family member after he discovered that his wife had cheated on him. He failed to hit the hotel, and instead hit several objects before crashing the plane into another building. His wife committed suicide a few days later. In total, seven people were killed and four were wounded.	Embraer_EMB-721C_Sertanejo_AN2017302	
Suicide attempt resulting in fatal crash	Feb 9, 1982	Pilot	Commercial flight	JAL Flight 350	24	The captain, Seiji Katagiri, engaged number 2 and 3 engines' thrust-reversers in flight. The first officer and flight engineer were able to partially regain control, but the aircraft crashed into Tokyo Bay, killing 24 of the 174 people on board. Katagiri survived the crash.		
Confirmed suicide	Sep 15, 1982	Pilot	General aviation	Bankstown Airport incident	1	Philip Henryk Wozniak, a student pilot, stole a SOCATA Tobago and killed himself by deliberately crashing into Bankstown Airport in the City of Bankstown, New South Wales, Australia. Two aircraft on the ground were also destroyed.	G-MRTN_Socata_Tobago_TB-10_(26153031834)	
Confirmed suicide	May 3, 1988	Pilot	General aviation	Unscheduled solo flight	1	A man told his friend he was going to commit suicide after breaking up with his girlfriend and being stressed from home problems. The next day he flew his Cessna 150 into a cliff in Kotzebue, Alaska, United States.		
Confirmed suicide	Jul 14, 1988	Pilot	General aviation	Stolen aircraft	1	A mentally unstable airport employee stole an Aero Commander 500S Shrike Commander and crashed it near Wee Waa, Australia.	VH-YJR_(16434525837)	
Confirmed suicide	Mar 23, 1994	Pilot	General aviation	Unscheduled solo flight from Spirit of St. Louis Airport in Chesterfield, Missouri.	1	Bob Richards was having marital and other personal problems. He deliberately crashed his Piper Cherokee single-engine airplane onto the ground. He was alone in the plane, and the only fatality.		
Confirmed suicide	Jul 13, 1994	Pilot	Military	Stolen aircraft	1	A Russian air force engineer stole an Antonov An-26 at Kubinka air base outside Moscow. He circled the aircraft until it ran out of fuel and crashed.		
Confirmed suicide	Aug 21, 1994	Pilot	Commercial flight	Royal Air Maroc Flight 630	44	The pilot intentionally crashed the plane.		
Confirmed suicide	Sep 12, 1994	Pilot	General aviation	Stolen aircraft	1	Frank Eugene Corder intentionally crashed his plane on the White House south lawn.		
Confirmed suicide	Apr 2, 1997	Pilot	Military	Craig D. Button incident	1	While on a training mission, Button flew off course and ceased radio contact. The A-10 Thunderbolt II later crashed into a mountain in Colorado. The United States Air Force declared his death a suicide because no other generally accepted hypothesis explains the events.		
Believed to be suicide	Dec 19, 1997	Pilot	Commercial flight	SilkAir Flight 185	104	The United States' NTSB ruled the incident a suicide, but the Indonesian NTSC listed the cause as undetermined. A private investigation blamed a flaw in the plane's rudder.		
Confirmed suicide	Sep 6, 1998	Pilot	General aviation	Stolen aircraft	1	Crashed intentionally by off duty flight instructor at Embry-Riddle Aeronautical University in Daytona Beach, Florida.		
Confirmed suicide	Oct 11, 1999	Pilot	Stolen commercial aircraft	1999 Air Botswana incident	1	Pilot commandeered and then crashed an Air Botswana aircraft into a group of aircraft at Sir Seretse Khama International Airport in Gaborone, Botswana, destroying both the plane as well as the parked aircraft at their stands, effectively crippling the airline as they lost all their operational airliners.		
Confirmed suicide	Oct 31, 1999	First officer	Commercial flight	EgyptAir Flight 990	217	After the captain left the cockpit, the relief first officer Gameel Al-Batouti disengaged the autopilot and shut down the engines, causing the plane to crash into the Atlantic Ocean. The reasons for his actions were not determined. The U.S. National Transportation Safety Board concluded that the crash was a murder-suicide, while the Egyptian Civil Aviation Authority blamed a fault in the elevator control system.		
Confirmed suicide	July 3, 2000	Pilot	General aviation	2000 Whittier Cessna 172S crash	1	A 40-year-old man wanted on an arrest warrant for arson crashed a rented Cessna 172 plane into water off Whittier, Alaska, United States. The pilot gave a suicide note to a friend shortly before the crash.	Air_Auckland_Cessna_172_ZK-MDV_Ardmore	
Confirmed suicide	Jan 5, 2002	Pilot	General aviation	2002 Tampa airplane crash	1	Pilot, teen Charles J. Bishop, crashed his plane into Bank of America Plaza. He praised Osama bin Laden for September 11, 2001 attacks in his suicide note.		
Confirmed suicide	Sep 16, 2003	Pilot	General aviation	Stone Mountain	1	Phillip Daniel Rogers deliberately crashed his single-engine Beechcraft Bonanza light aircraft into the south side of Stone Mountain in Stone Mountain, Georgia, United States.	N3050K_1987_Beech_A36_Bonanza_36_C-N_E-2364_(7757064500)	
Confirmed suicide	Jul 22, 2005	Pilot	General aviation	2005 Berlin airplane crash	1	A 39-year old pilot deliberately crashed his own light aircraft, a Platzer Kiebitz, in a field right in front of the Reichstag in Berlin.	D-MUTA_(40748180191)	
Confirmed suicide	Feb 18, 2010	Pilot	General aviation	2010 Austin suicide attack	2 (pilot, 1 on the ground)	Andrew Joseph Stack III deliberately crashed his single-engine Piper Dakota light aircraft into Building I of the Echelon complex housing IRS offices in Austin, Texas, United States.		
Confirmed suicide	Jul 22, 2013	Pilot	General aviation	Shannon Airport Cessna 172 crash	1	The pilot took off in a Cessna 172M from Shannon Airport in Fredericksburg, Virginia. The pilot's fiancée summoned police, saying that she and the pilot had an altercation before the flight, and that he intended to kill himself. The aircraft went into a steep dive and crashed northwest of the runway.	Air_Auckland_Cessna_172_ZK-MDV_Ardmore	
Confirmed suicide	Nov 29, 2013	Pilot	Commercial flight	LAM Mozambique Airlines Flight 470	33	The pilot intentionally crashed the aircraft. The co-pilot was locked out of the cockpit, according to the voice recorder.		
Possible suicide	Mar 8, 2014	Pilot	Commercial flight	Malaysia Airlines Flight 370	239	The flight data recorder and cockpit voice recorder have not been recovered. A leading theory amongst experts is that either the pilot or the co-pilot committed murder–suicide.		
Confirmed suicide	Mar 24, 2015	First officer	Commercial flight	Germanwings Flight 9525	150	Co-pilot Andreas Lubitz, previously treated for depression and suicidal tendencies, locked the captain out of the cockpit before crashing the plane into a mountain near Prads-Haute-Bléone, Alpes-de-Haute-Provence, France.		
Confirmed suicide	Dec 29, 2015	Pilot	General aviation	2015 Anchorage plane crash	1	A 42-year-old man flew a Cessna 172 belonging to the Civil Air Patrol into a downtown Anchorage, Alaska, United States, office building where his wife worked, killing himself. No one on the ground was injured.	Air_Auckland_Cessna_172_ZK-MDV_Ardmore	
Confirmed suicide	Oct 11, 2016	Student pilot	General aviation	East Hartford Piper PA-34 Seneca crash	1	Jordanian student pilot Feras Freitekh was killed and his instructor injured when their Piper PA-34 crashed into a utility pole during the landing approach in East Hartford, Connecticut. The instructor said there was an argument and a struggle for control, and investigators concluded the crash was a suicide. The crash took place outside the headquarters of aerospace manufacturer Pratt & Whitney, but the Federal Bureau of Investigation ruled out terrorism due to a lack of evidence.	Piper_PA-34_Naples_run_(cropped)	
Confirmed suicide	Dec 15, 2016	Pilot	General aviation	2016 Aniak Piper PA-11 crash	2	A 62-year-old man piloted his plane into a mountain near Aniak, Alaska, United States, killing himself and his wife who had cancer. The NTSB and authorities said the crash was suicide by pilot.		
Confirmed suicide	Mar 15, 2017	Pilot	General aviation	Manitouwadge Cessna 172 crash	1	Experienced pilot Xin Rong departed from Ann Arbor, Michigan, in a Cessna 172P and disappeared. The aircraft was found wrecked late that night near Manitouwadge, Ontario, with a door open, but no human remains nor footprints in the snow were found. Investigators concluded that Rong deliberately jumped out en route and the Cessna later ran out of fuel. His remains were found in September 2018 in a wooded area in Chapin Township, Michigan. The cause of death was severe blunt force trauma.	Air_Auckland_Cessna_172_ZK-MDV_Ardmore	
Confirmed suicide	Aug 10, 2018	Ground service employee	Stolen commercial aircraft	2018 Horizon Air Q400 incident	1	Horizon Air ground service employee Richard "Beebo" Russell took off without authorization in a Bombardier Dash 8 Q400 from Sea-Tac International Airport and performed aerobatic maneuvers over Sea-Tac and Puget Sound whilst being pursued by fighter jets. Russell crashed the plane into Ketron Island in the South Puget Sound.		
Confirmed suicide	Aug 13, 2018	Pilot	Stolen private aircraft	Stolen Cessna 525 CitationJet	1	An experienced pilot who was released after arrest for domestic assault charges stole an aircraft then crashed at his own home in Payson, Utah, in an apparent attempt to murder his wife. The man was killed, but no one in the house was injured.		
Confirmed suicide	Mar 23, 2019	Pilot	General aviation	2019 Matsieng Aerodrome Beechcraft King Air crash	1	The pilot stole a plane from Sir Seretse Khama International Airport and crashed it into the Matsieng airfield's aeroclub in an attempt to kill his wife. She and other guests left the building beforehand and were unharmed.		
Confirmed suicide	Sep 10, 2021	Pilot	General aviation	Stolen Cessna; 172S Skyhawk	1	A man who had been diagnosed with terminal cancer and was told that he had three months left to live, crashed the aircraft into a field near Ashford, UK.	Air_Auckland_Cessna_172_ZK-MDV_Ardmore	
Believed to be suicide	Mar 21, 2022	Pilot	Commercial flight	China Eastern Airlines Flight 5735	132	Investigators believe the airliner was intentionally crashed, but as of 2026, the official investigation is still open.		
Confirmed suicide	Jul 17, 2023	Pilot	General aviation	Cessna 210M	1	A 64-year-old pilot intentionally crashed his aircraft into the cliffside of Bradda Head, near Port Erin, Isle of Man. He was the only fatality. The pilot had suffered from sleep issues and anxiety leading up to the crash. During the flight, he made several calls to a family member that indicated he did not plan on returning.	Cessna_210M_(4561914868)	
Confirmed suicide	Oct 15, 2023	Pilot	Skydiving flight	Cessna 208 Caravan I	1	After dropping 15 skydivers the pilot deviated from the set course and flew the plane into mountainous terrain. The pilot was suffering from psycho-emotional problems, and his verbal exchange before crashing with the ground coordinator for the parachuting operation confirmed his suicidal intentions.		
Confirmed suicide	Apr 11, 2024	Pilot	General aviation	Piper PA-28 Cherokee	1	A Purdue University student crashed his plane into a field north of Montmorenci, Indiana, United States, killing himself. The pilot left behind suicide notes.		
Confirmed suicide	Aug 16, 2024	Pilot	General aviation	Piper J-3 Cub	1	Scott Bloomquist crashed his aircraft into a barn near his home in Mooresburg, Tennessee, killing himself. The autopsy report said it was suicide.		
Possible suicide	Jun 12, 2025	Pilot	Commercial flight	Air India Flight 171	260 (241 on plane and 19 on the ground)	Shortly after takeoff, Air India Flight 171 crashed into the student hostels of the Byramjee Jeejeebhoy Medical College, 1.7 kilometres (1 mi; 0.9 nmi) from the runway, killing 241 of the 242 people on board and 19 people on the ground. The preliminary report showed both fuel control switches had transitioned from RUN to CUTOFF three seconds after take-off, which immediately shut down both engines. U.S. government and industry officials believed the captain had likely shut down the aircraft's engines. A draft final report is expected by October 2026.		
Confirmed suicide	Jun 26, 2026	Pilot	General aviation	2026 Beijing Sunward SA 60L Crash	1	Liu Junhua crashed a Sunward SA 60L Aurora into the CITIC Tower, the tallest skyscraper in Beijing. He was killed and 13 people on the ground were injured. Authorities said the pilot carried out the act for personal reasons, indicating pilot suicide.		
Attempted suicide halted	September 30, 2026	First officer	Commercial flight	Flydubai Flight 1073	0	While cruising, the first officer allegedly stabbed the captain, seriously injuring him, before being subdued by passengers. The plane went into several dives, descending to 15,000 feet (4,600 m) from 34,000 feet (10,000 m). A pair of deadheading pilots took control of the plane, which made a safe emergency landing in Tabuk, Saudi Arabia.		

=== By hijackers ===
Classification	Crash date	Attacker	Flight Type	Flight	Fatalities	Theories	Aircraft	Refs
Confirmed suicide	May 7, 1964	Passenger	Commercial flight	Pacific Air Lines Flight 773	44	Francisco Paula Gonzales, a depressed man in debt, shot both pilots before shooting himself, causing the plane to crash. All 44 people on board died.		
Attempted suicide halted	March 17, 1970	Passenger	Commercial flight	Eastern Air Lines Shuttle Flight 1320	1 (first officer)	Passenger John J. Divivo shot both pilots, but the first officer took Divivo's gun and shot him before succumbing to his own wounds. Despite gunshot wounds in both arms, the captain landed the aircraft safely. Divivo subsequently hanged himself while awaiting trial.		
Attempted suicide halted	February 22, 1974	Terrorist hijacker	Commercial flight	Delta Air Lines Flight 523	3 (hijacker, co-pilot, police officer)	Samuel Byck intended to crash into the White House in the hope of killing U.S. President Richard Nixon. He killed a police officer and hijacked the aircraft, but the aircraft never left the gate. Byck shot the co-pilot before being wounded by police in a shootout and committing suicide.		
Confirmed suicide	December 4, 1977	Unknown	Commercial flight	Malaysian Airline System Flight 653	100	Flight 653 was hijacked by an unidentified individual or group demanding the pilots to divert to Singapore, but before they could land, the hijacker(s) shot and killed both pilots, causing the plane to crash, which resulted in the death of all 100 on board. The motive of the hijacker(s) was unknown.		
Confirmed suicide	December 7, 1987	Former employee	Commercial flight	Pacific Southwest Airlines Flight 1771	43	The plane was hijacked by David A. Burke, a disgruntled former employee of USAir, who is believed to have shot his former boss, both pilots, a flight attendant and the chief pilot of Pacific Southwest Airlines before crashing the plane near Cayucos, California, United States.		
Attempted suicide halted	September 29, 1988	Passenger	Commercial flight	VASP Flight 375	1 (co-pilot)	The plane suffered a hijack attempt by Raimundo Nonato Alves da Conceição, who planned to attack the Planalto Palace and kill Brazilian President José Sarney. He killed co-pilot Salvador Evangelista but was stopped by commander Fernando Murilo de Lima e Silva.		
Attempted suicide halted	April 7, 1994	Employee and off duty pilot	Commercial flight	Federal Express Flight 705	0 (4 injured)	Deadheading Federal Express pilot Auburn Calloway smuggled weapons aboard and attempted to hijack the cargo jet and crash it in an insurance fraud scheme for his family's benefit. Despite severe injuries inflicted by Calloway, the crew subdued him using a number of techniques including high-speed aerobatic maneuvers, and landed safely.		
Attempted suicide halted	December 24, 1994	Terrorist hijackers	Commercial flight	Air France Flight 8969	7 (all 4 hijackers, 3 passengers)	After having killed three passengers, the hijackers intended to crash the aircraft into the Eiffel Tower in Paris. When the aircraft reached Marseille, a counterterror unit of the French National Gendarmerie (GIGN) raided the aircraft and killed all four hijackers.		
Confirmed suicide	September 11, 2001	Terrorist hijackers	Commercial flight	American Airlines Flight 11	1,390 (87 passengers and crew, 5 hijackers. About 1,303 on the ground when compounded with United Airlines Flight 175)	Aircraft hijacked and crashed into the North Tower of the World Trade Center by hijackers as part of the September 11, 2001 attacks.		
Confirmed suicide	September 11, 2001	Terrorist hijackers	Commercial flight	United Airlines Flight 175	1,363 (60 passengers and crew, 5 hijackers, about 1,303 on the ground)	Aircraft hijacked and crashed into the South Tower of the World Trade Center by hijackers as part of September 11, 2001 attacks.		
Confirmed suicide	September 11, 2001	Terrorist hijackers	Commercial flight	American Airlines Flight 77	189 (59 passengers and crew, 5 hijackers, 125 on the ground)	Aircraft hijacked and crashed into the Pentagon by hijackers as part of September 11, 2001 attacks.		
Confirmed suicide	September 11, 2001	Terrorist hijackers	Commercial flight	United Airlines Flight 93	44 (40 passengers and crew, 4 hijackers)	Aircraft hijacked as part of September 11, 2001 attacks. Passengers revolted against the hijackers, resulting in the jet crashing in Stonycreek Township, Pennsylvania. Although all aboard died, the passengers prevented the hijackers from reaching their target, thought to be the White House or the Capitol Building.		
Attempted suicide halted	July 7, 2021	Passenger	Commercial flight	Ryan Air Services flight	0	A passenger grabbed the controls of a Cessna 208 Caravan on approach to Aniak Airport and placed the aircraft in a dive. He was restrained by other passengers and the pilot regained control and landed safely. The hijacker was arrested by Alaska State Troopers and admitted that the incident was an attempted murder-suicide.		
Attempted suicide halted	Oct 22, 2023	Employee and off duty pilot	Commercial flight	Alaska Airlines Flight 2059	0	Deadheading pilot attempted to turn off engines. The flight was forced to divert at Portland International Airport and the pilot was arrested and charged.		

== Published studies ==
A 2016 study published in Aerospace Medicine and Human Performance analyzed suicide and homicide-suicide events involving aircraft. They state, "In aeromedical literature and in the media, these very different events are both described as pilot suicide, but in psychiatry they are considered separate events with distinct risk factors." In the years 1999–2015 the study found 65 cases of pilot suicide (compared to 195 pilot errors) and six cases of passengers who jumped from aircraft. There were 18 cases of homicide-suicide, totaling 732 deaths; of these events, 13 were perpetrated by pilots. Compared to non-aviation samples, a large percentage of pilot suicides in this study were homicide-suicides (17%).

== Prevention ==
U.S. regulations require at least two flight crew members to be in the cockpit at all times for safety reasons, to be able to help in any medical or other emergency, including intervening if a crew member tries to crash the plane. Following the deliberate crash of Germanwings Flight 9525 on March 24, 2015, some European, Canadian and Japanese airlines adopted a two-in-cockpit policy as did all Australian airlines for aircraft with 50 or more passenger seats.

== See also ==
- Aviation accidents and incidents
- Aviation safety
- List of aircraft hijackings, for instances where a hijacker crashed the aircraft
- Vehicle ramming attack
- Mental health in aviation
- Suicide by cop
- John Verrept, the first person in history to commit suicide with a plane
