= Barra do Garças air disaster =

Suicide by pilot in Barra do Garças, Brazil

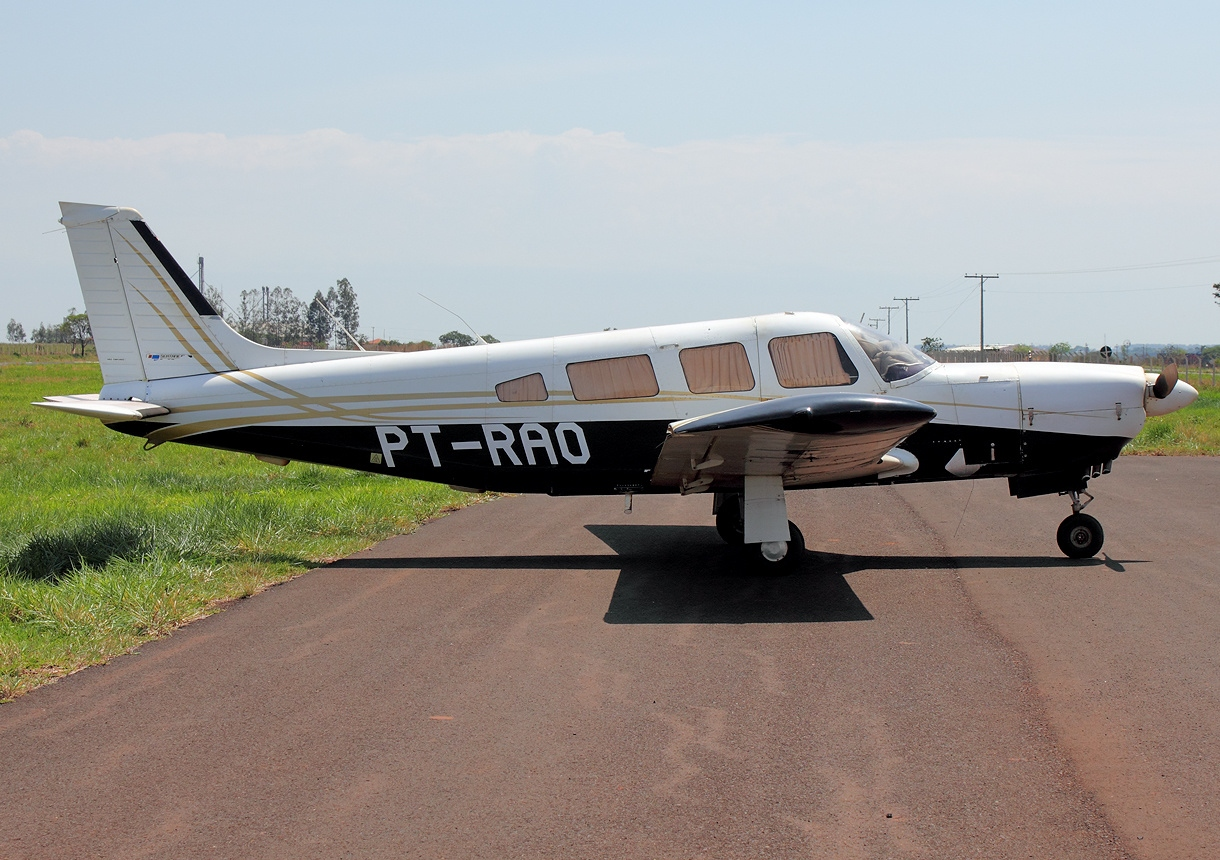
- An Embraer EMB-721C Sertanejo similar to the incident aircraft

Accident
- Date: 1 June 1980
- Summary: Suicide by aircraft
- Site: Barra do Garças, Mato Grosso, Brazil

Aircraft
- Aircraft type: Embraer EMB-721 Sertanejo series single-engine aircraft
- Operator: Taxi Aéreo Garapú
- Registration: PT-EGI
- Flight origin: Aragarças, Goiás, Brazil
- Destination: Cuiabá, Mato Grosso, Brazil
- Occupants: 5
- Passengers: 4
- Crew: 1
- Fatalities: 7 (Two on the ground)
- Injuries: 4
- Survivors: 4

The Barra do Garças air disaster was a suicide attack that occurred in Barra do Garças, Mato Grosso, Brazil, on June 1, 1980, when pilot Mauro Milhomem attempted to crash a single-engine aircraft into the Hotel Presidente owned by his mother-in-law, killing six people and himself and wounding four others.

== Background ==
Prior to the crash, Milhomem had an argument with his wife after he determined that she had been unfaithful to him. Milhomem threatened to crash a plane into the hotel owned by his wife's mother.

== Crash ==
On June 1, 1980, Milhomem, a pilot for the air taxi service Táxi Aereo Garapu, flew an Embraer EMB Sertanejo-721 single-engine airplane registered as PT-EGI with four passengers inside it to the Hotel Presidente, where his wife was residing, and attempted to hit the hotel; he failed to control the aircraft and instead hit a tree, several utility poles, and ultimately a two-story building, and finally crashed into an accounting office.

In addition to Milhomem, three people died immediately; another died while being transported to Goiânia, and two more died within the two days following the crash. Four people were injured, two seriously, and were treated in a Barra do Garças hospital.

== Aftermath ==
Initially, Aldirio Oliveira Vieira, an official of the Brazilian airport authority Infraero, said that the plane had been flying at a low altitude around the building, struck a utility pole with its right wing rupturing its gasoline tank, hit a second pole, and then crashed into an accounting office. It was later determined that the pilot, Milhomem, had attempted unsuccessfully to execute a kamikaze-style attack on the hotel building which his mother-in-law owned.

Milhomem's wife, Angela Milhomem, allegedly committed suicide a few days after the crash. She was shunned and harassed by the locals who accused her of being the one who caused the tragedy.

== See also ==
- Connellan air disaster
- Suicide by pilot
- Kamikaze attack
- List of rampage killers § Vehicular homicide
