= Japan Air Lines Flight 350 =

1982 deliberate crash in Tokyo, Japan

Japan Air Lines Flight 350 日本航空350便
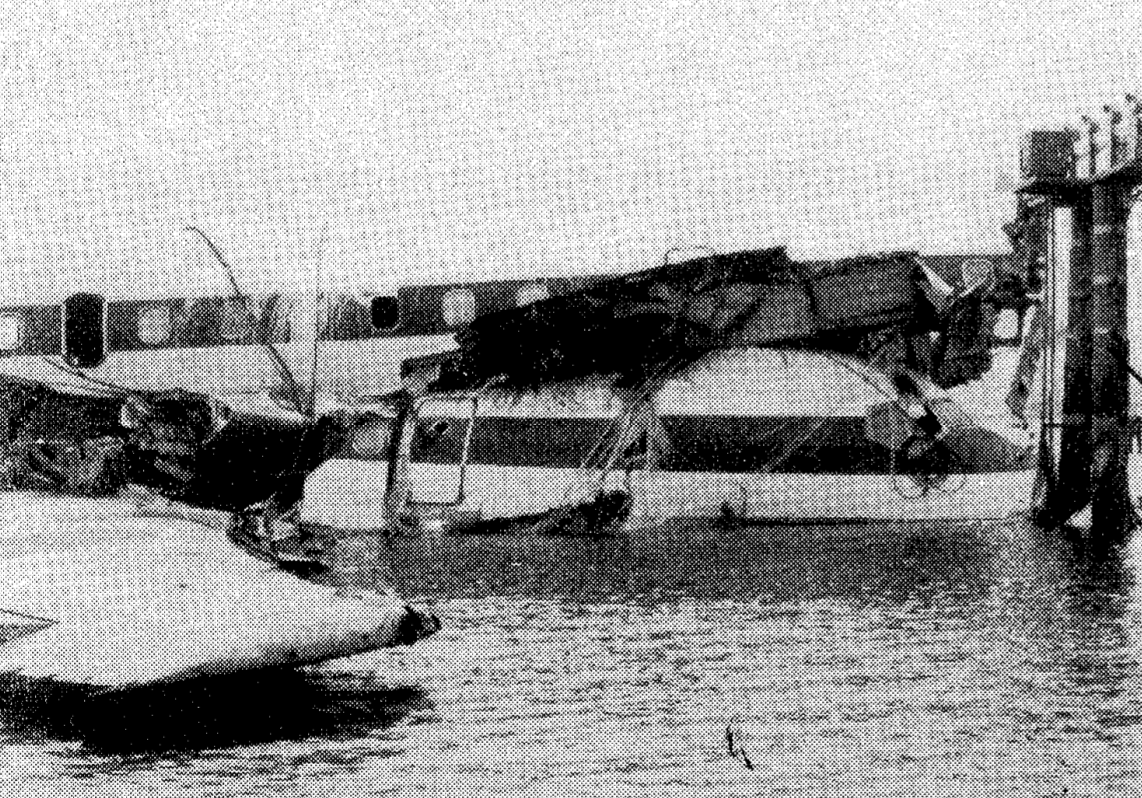
- Wreckage of JA8061

Occurrence
- Date: 9 February 1982
- Summary: Deliberate crash by pilot
- Site: Haneda Airport, Tokyo, Japan; 35.53729°N 139.78244°E

Aircraft
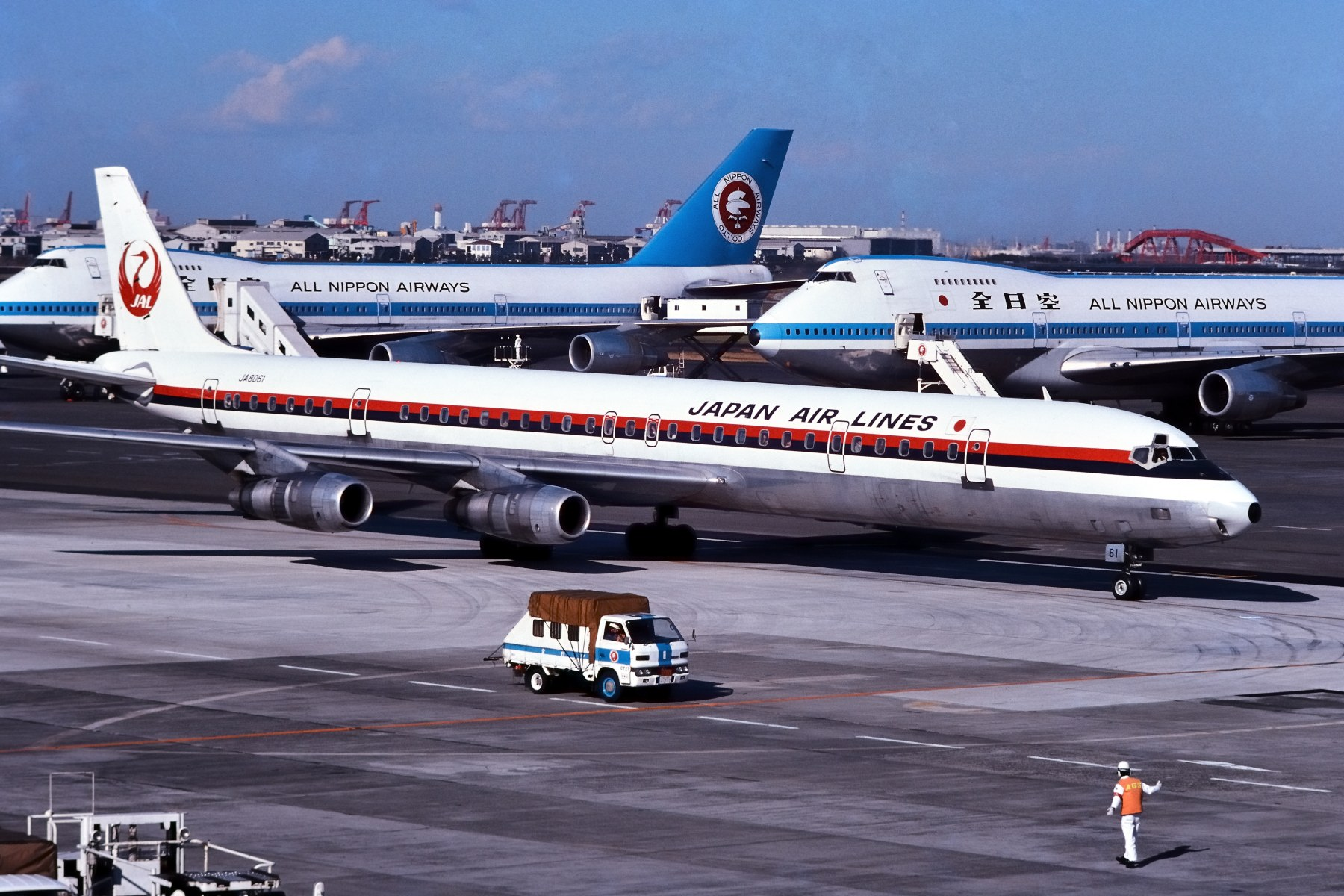
- JA8061, the aircraft involved in the accident, seen in 1981
- Aircraft type: McDonnell Douglas DC-8-61
- Operator: Japan Air Lines
- IATA flight No.: JL350
- ICAO flight No.: JAL350
- Call sign: JAPAN AIR 350
- Registration: JA8061
- Flight origin: Fukuoka Airport
- Destination: Haneda Airport
- Occupants: 174
- Passengers: 166
- Crew: 8
- Fatalities: 24
- Injuries: 77
- Survivors: 150

Japan Air Lines Flight 350 was a domestic scheduled passenger flight from Fukuoka, Fukuoka Prefecture, to Tokyo in Japan. On 9 February 1982, the Douglas DC-8 operating the flight, registered JA8061, crashed into Tokyo Bay on approach to Haneda Airport, resulting in 24 fatalities. Flight 350 was the first crash for Japan Air Lines in the 1980s. The investigation traced the cause of the crash to the deliberate actions of the captain, who was subsequently tried and found not guilty by reason of insanity.

== Background ==
=== Aircraft ===
The aircraft involved was a McDonnell Douglas DC-8-61 registered as JA8061. It was manufactured by McDonnell Douglas in 1967 and in its 15 years of service, it had logged 36,955 airframe hours. It was equipped with four Pratt & Whitney JT3D-3B engines.

=== Crew ===
In command of Flight 350 was 35-year-old Captain Seiji Katagiri (片桐 清二 Katagiri Seiji). He had joined Japan Airlines on October 1, 1969, and accumulated a total flight time of 5,698 hours at the time of the incident, of which 484 hours were flown as captain on the DC-8. He obtained his DC-8 captain's license on December 18, 1979.

Katagiri's crewmates were 33-year-old First Officer Yoshifumi Ishikawa, and 48-year-old flight engineer Yoshimi Ozaki. They had flown with Katagiri in the same aircraft involved in the accident on the previous day, 8 February 1982, operating as Flight 377 from Haneda to Fukuoka.

== Accident ==
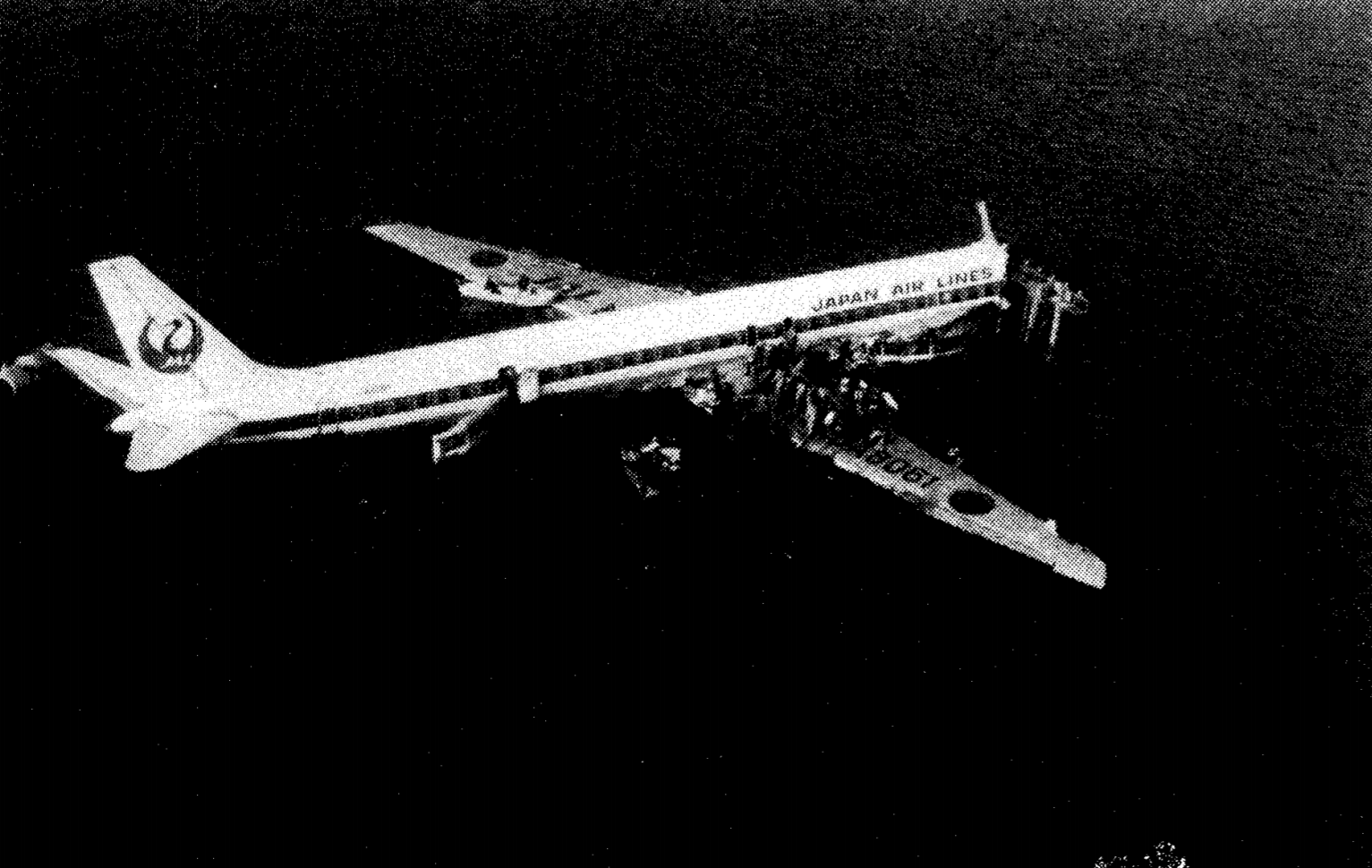
Another angle of the aircraft involved

Flight 350 took off at 07:34 from runway 16 at Fukuoka Airport. At 07:51, the flight leveled off and maintained its cruising altitude of 29,000 feet (8,800 m) until the cockpit crew began their descent on approach to Haneda Airport at 08:19. Flight 350 was cleared to enter the ILS approach to runway 33R, and the landing gear and flaps were configured for final approach by 08:41. As the crew began their final approach, the cockpit voice recorder captured Captain Katagiri crying out loud.

At 08:44, while Flight 350 was flying at an altitude of 164 feet (50 m) at a speed of 130 knots (240 km/h), Katagiri disengaged the autopilot. He then pushed the yoke forward and pulled the throttle back to idle before engaging the thrust-reversers on the inboard engines. First Officer Ishikawa noticed Katagiri's actions and countered by pulling back the yoke on the co-pilot's side to regain control. Flight engineer Ozaki stood up from his seat and attempted to return the thrust reversers to the idle position while physically restraining Katagiri with a slap to the wrist. Despite their efforts, the DC-8's descent could not be fully arrested, and it crashed within seconds after the cockpit crew's struggle into shallow water 510 meters (1673 feet) short of runway 33R. The cockpit was separated from the rest of the fuselage and continued to travel for several meters before coming to a halt. The other half of the fuselage trailed behind and subsequently came to rest on top of the cockpit section.

The cockpit crew survived the crash, albeit injured and, except for Ishikawa, knocked unconscious. Katagiri was awakened immediately after the crash by two flight attendants stationed at the front of the aircraft, while Ozaki remained unconscious for the next 40 minutes until rescued by a fishing boat. Upon seeing the resulting damage from the crash, Ishikawa reportedly yelled at Katagiri, prompting the latter to burst into tears as the flight attendants tried to calm him down. The flight attendants in the rear cabin attempted to contact the cockpit until realizing the communication system had been severed by the crash, at which point they initiated the evacuation procedure.

Among the 166 passengers and 8 crew, 24 died. Following the incident, Katagiri, one of the first people to take a rescue boat, took off his tie and coat, then put on a cardigan to convince rescuers that he was an office worker and avoid being identified as the captain. This led to initial police reports stating that Katagiri was among the casualties until he was located and identified while having his injuries treated in a nearby hotel within hours after the crash.

== Investigation ==
=== Mental health history of Seiji Katagiri ===
Seiji Katagiri was later found to have paranoid schizophrenia prior to the incident, which resulted in him being ruled not guilty by reason of insanity.

Investigators for the Japanese government traced Katagiri's mental history through testimonies from close associates. These testimonies revealed that Katagiri exhibited abnormal behavior and claimed to be hallucinating as early as 1976. Family members noted he became less talkative around this time, while his colleagues at Japan Airlines raised suspicions of him suffering from neurosis prior to the Flight 350 incident. Later, his hallucinations became auditory in nature and increased in frequency to the point where he had to cancel flights. In November 1980, Katagiri's superiors at Japan Airlines temporarily removed him from flight duties after an incident where he deviated from the planned flight route and provided insufficient thrust inputs, causing him and his crew to delay turns and frequently initiate go-arounds.

Following his temporary removal from flight duties, Katagiri underwent psychiatric counseling upon the recommendation of his superiors and was diagnosed with depression due to dysautonomia. He was ordered to have a mental health leave from work until April 1981, when he was allowed to resume flying, albeit as a co-pilot. Despite concerns from Katagiri's wife over his behavior remaining unchanged even while resuming treatment after returning to work, Katagiri's doctors sent a letter to Japan Airlines on October 6, 1981, clearing him for reinstatement as a captain on the basis that his condition was not observed to have disrupted his flight performance. Katagiri was subsequently reinstated as a captain a month after the doctors' letter was sent.

Shortly before the incident, Katagiri vocally expressed paranoid delusions, specifically beliefs that the Soviet Union was conspiring to divide Japan by splitting it into two factions and inciting wars between them. First Officer Ishikawa later testified that during the accident flight, he observed Katagiri in a "state of delusion" and trembling with fear while remarking that he would die rather than be captured and brutally killed by an "enemy". Katagiri's crewmates also noted that on the day before the crash, he exhibited erratic behavior during their flight from Haneda to Fukuoka and deviated from their flight plan by switching the right-hand engines to counterthrust. Katagiri's delusions, combined with a panic attack and the auditory illusion of hearing voices that Katagiri claimed were telling him to die, contributed to his decision to crash the aircraft.

=== Aftermath ===
The investigators concluded that the incident was attributed to the auditory hallucinations that Katagiri experienced during the flight and the lack of proper medical examinations that allowed him to fly despite his ongoing mental condition. Katagiri was released from psychiatric care after several years.

== See also ==
- Accidents and incidents involving the Douglas DC-8 family
- List of declared or suspected pilot suicides
- Aviation safety
- List of accidents and incidents involving airliners by location § Japan
- List of Japan Airlines incidents and accidents
- Suicide by pilot

Specific incidents

- Flydubai Flight 1073
- EgyptAir Flight 990
- Germanwings Flight 9525
- JetBlue Flight 191
- LAM Mozambique Airlines Flight 470
- Royal Air Maroc Flight 630
- SilkAir Flight 185
