= Royal Air Maroc Flight 630 =

1994 deliberate plane crash in Morocco

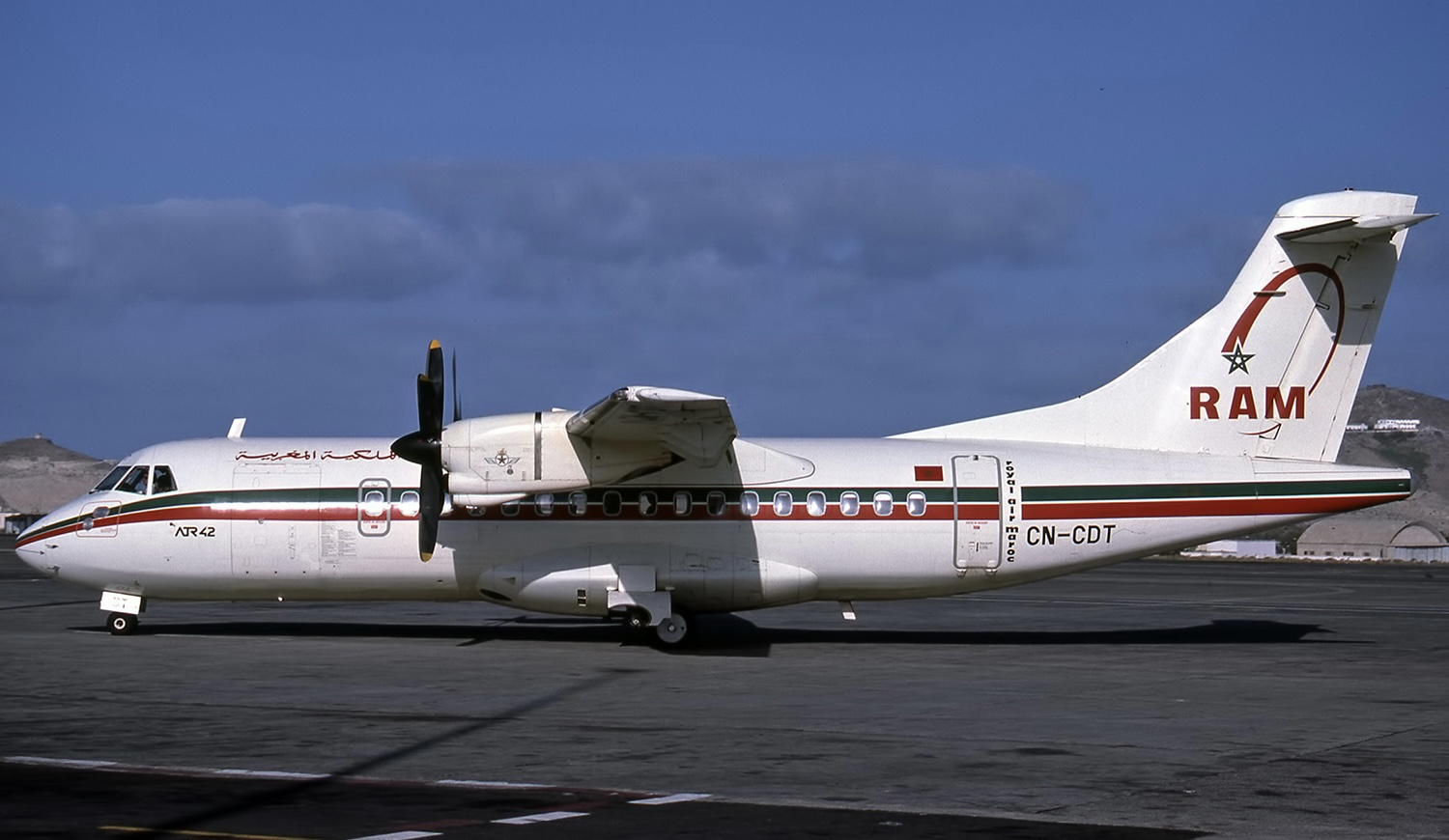
- CN-CDT, the aircraft involved in the crash

Occurrence
- Date: 21 August 1994
- Summary: Suicide by pilot
- Site: Douar Izounine, Morocco; 30°36′00″N 9°19′00″W

Aircraft
- Aircraft type: ATR 42-312
- Operator: Royal Air Maroc
- Call sign: ROYAL AIR MAROC 630
- Registration: CN-CDT
- Flight origin: Al Massira International Airport, Agadir, Morocco
- Destination: Mohamed V Airport, Casablanca, Morocco
- Occupants: 44
- Passengers: 40
- Crew: 4
- Fatalities: 44
- Survivors: 0

Royal Air Maroc Flight 630 was a passenger flight on 21 August 1994 which crashed approximately ten minutes after takeoff from Agadir–Al Massira Airport in Morocco. All 44 passengers and crew on board were killed. It was the deadliest ATR 42 aircraft crash at that point in time. An investigation showed that the crash was deliberately caused by one of the pilots.

== Background ==
=== Aircraft ===
The aircraft involved was an ATR 42-312 which had its maiden flight on 20 January 1989. The aircraft was delivered to Royal Air Maroc on 24 March the same year. The aircraft was powered by two Pratt & Whitney Canada PW120 turboprop engines.

=== Crew ===
The captain was 32-year-old Younes Khayati, who had 4,500 flight hours. The first officer was Sofia Figuigui.

== Flight ==
Victims' nationalities
Nationality	Passengers	Crew	Total
Morocco	20	4	24
Italy	8	-	8
France	5	-	5
Netherlands	4	-	4
Kuwait	2	-	2
United States	1	-	1
Total	40	4	44

Flight 630 was a scheduled flight from Agadir, Morocco to Casablanca using an ATR 42 aircraft. At approximately 10 minutes into the flight while climbing through 16,000 feet (4,900 m), the aircraft entered a steep dive, and crashed into a region of the Atlas Mountains about 32 kilometres (20 mi; 17 nmi) north of Agadir.

The crash site was at Douar Izounine, about 32 kilometres (20 mi; 17 nmi) north of Agadir. Among the 40 passengers on board were a Kuwaiti prince, Ali al-Humoud al-Jaber al-Sabah, and his wife. The prince was the brother of Ahmed al-Humoud al-Jaber al-Sabah, then Kuwait's minister of defence.

== Investigation ==
The commission that investigated the crash determined it to be pilot suicide. Flight recorder data revealed that the ATR 42's autopilot was intentionally disconnected by Captain Khayati, who then deliberately put the aircraft into a dive. Evidence also showed that during the descent, First Officer Figuigui had sent out distress calls once aware of the captain's intentions. The Moroccan pilots union disputed the suicide explanation, claiming that Captain Khayati was mentally fit and showed no signs of frustration, and instead claiming that Captain Khayati reported a "technical problem" prior to takeoff, although the investigative commission never found evidence supporting this claim. The crash was the deadliest incident involving an ATR 42 aircraft at that point in time.

== See also ==
- Accidents and incidents involving the ATR 42 family
- Aviation safety
- List of accidents and incidents involving airliners by location § Morocco
- List of declared or suspected pilot suicides
- List of accidents and incidents involving commercial aircraft
- Trigana Air Service Flight 267, current deadliest aviation accident involving an ATR 42
- Suicide by pilot

Specific incidents

- EgyptAir Flight 990
- Germanwings Flight 9525
- Japan Airlines Flight 350
- LAM Mozambique Airlines Flight 470
- SilkAir Flight 185
