= Craig D. Button =

US Air Force pilot who disappeared and crashed his A-10 aircraft (1964–1997)

Craig David Button
- Born: 24 November 1964
- Died: 2 April 1997 (aged 32); Gold Dust Peak, 15 miles (24 km) SW of Vail, Colorado, U.S.
- Military career
- Allegiance: United States
- Branch: United States Air Force
- Service years: 1990–1997
- Rank: Captain
- Units: 355th Fighter Wing, 12th Air Force

Craig David Button (24 November 1964 – 2 April 1997) was a United States Air Force captain who died when he crashed a Fairchild A-10 Thunderbolt II aircraft under mysterious circumstances on 2 April 1997. During the incident, Button inexplicably flew hundreds of miles off-course without radio contact, appeared to maneuver purposefully and did not attempt to eject before the crash. His death is regarded as a suicide because no other hypothesis adequately explains the events. The incident caused widespread public speculation about Button's intentions and whereabouts until the crash site was found three weeks later. The aircraft carried live bombs which have not been recovered.

== Biography ==
Craig Button graduated from Wantagh High School in Wantagh, Long Island, New York. He began flying at age 17 and aspired to be a professional pilot. Button was described as "polite", "quiet" and a "perfectionist" who "rarely drank and never smoked". One of his instructors remarked that his shoes were always shined. Button's next-door neighbor growing up reports that he was "a ridiculously hard worker".

Button's father, Richard Button, was a retired lieutenant colonel in the United States Air Force (USAF). His mother, Joan Button, was a devout Jehovah's Witness. According to a letter written by Button, she raised him "to think that joining the military is wrong" and refused to allow him to wear his college Air Force Reserve Officer Training Corps (AFROTC) uniform at home. Button's half-sister, Susane, reported that his mother had wanted him to leave the military.

Button was commissioned through the AFROTC program at New York Institute of Technology in Old Westbury, New York, where he received a degree in aerospace engineering in 1990. He spent four years at the Laughlin Air Force Base in Texas as a Cessna T-37 Tweet first assignment instructor pilot before being transferred to the 355th Fighter Wing, a Fairchild A-10 Thunderbolt II unit at Davis–Monthan Air Force Base in Tucson, Arizona. He had been a USAF pilot for five years before the crash.

== Events of April 2, 1997 ==
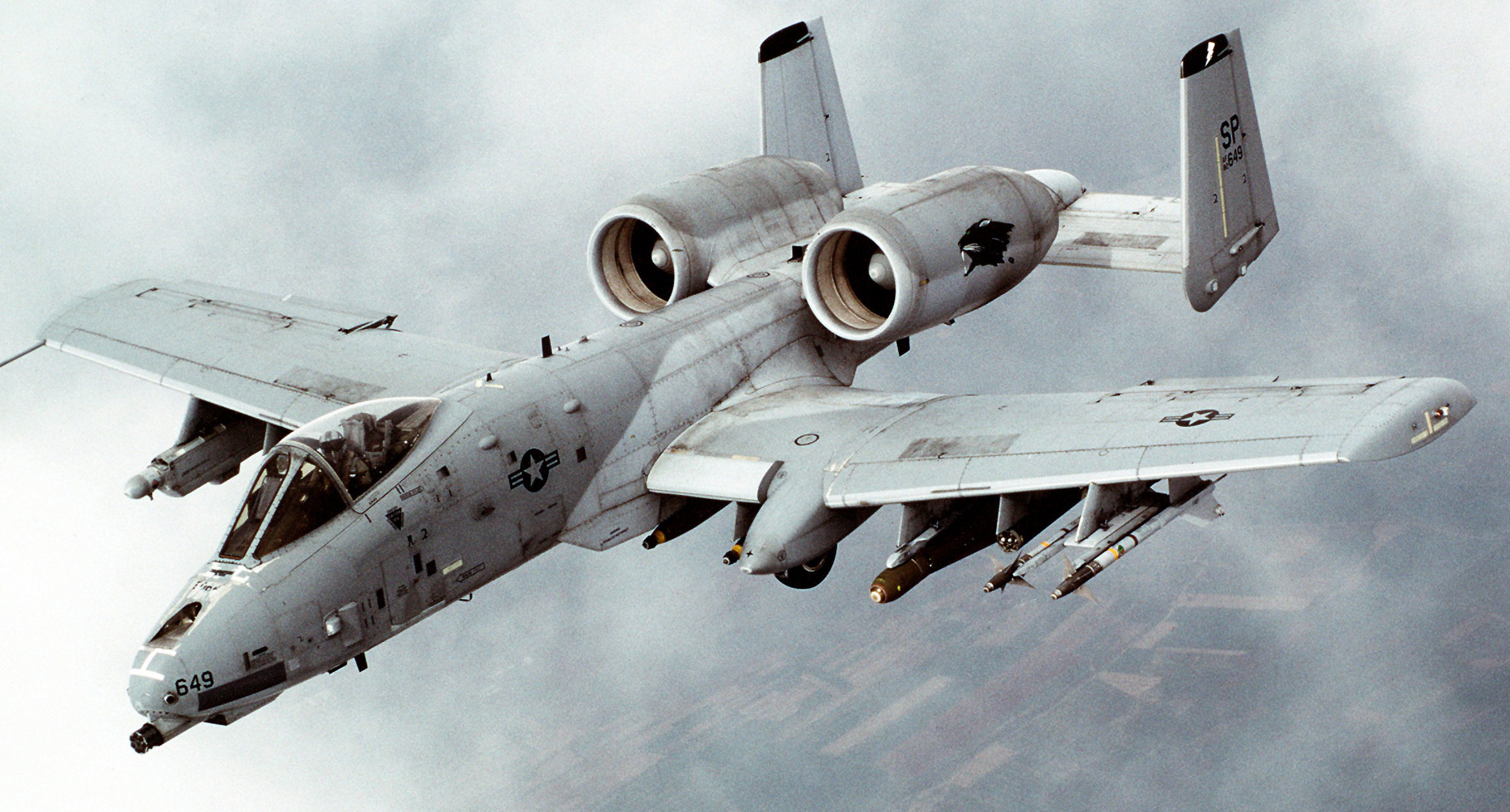
An A-10 Thunderbolt II similar to the one flown by Captain Craig D. Button

On April 2, 1997, Button took off in his single-seat A-10 attack aircraft on a training mission with two other A-10s from Davis-Monthan Air Force Base. His jet was armed with 4 Mark 82 bombs, 60 magnesium flares, and 120 metal chaff canisters, and its GAU-8 Avenger gun was loaded with 575 rounds of 30-millimeter ammunition. This training mission would have been the first time Button dropped live ordnance.

Near Gila Bend, Arizona, after being refueled in-flight, Button unexpectedly broke formation. He flew in a northeasterly direction towards the Four Corners area of Arizona, Colorado, New Mexico and Utah. His jet was spotted numerous times by observers on the ground. One observer, an off-duty pilot, said the jet appeared to maneuver around bad weather. This observation suggested to the USAF that the aircraft was being flown manually and purposefully. Button's flight was tracked by radar in Phoenix, Albuquerque, and Denver, but because the transponder in the aircraft was not operating (presumably turned off) it was only tracked, not identified. It was only after analyzing radar data later that investigators were able to track Button's flight.

Button's aircraft zig-zagged near the end of its flight. It was last spotted in the air about 100 miles (160 km) west of Denver. The jet impacted terrain about 15 miles (24 km) SW of Vail, Colorado, on Gold Dust Peak (39°28′44″N 106°35′40″W) in a remote part of Eagle County. The USAF concluded the jet probably had two to five minutes of fuel remaining when it crashed. The impact occurred at about 13,200 feet (4,000 m) of elevation, just 100 feet (30 m) below the summit. The debris field was over a quarter-mile-square area (0.16 km^{2}). Pieces of the canopy and cockpit went over a ridge.

=== Sightings ===
Time	Location
11:58 AM	east of Tucson, Arizona
12:10 PM	west of Apache Junction, Arizona
12:11 PM	several miles south of Theodore Roosevelt Lake
12:29 PM	north of Theodore Roosevelt Lake
12:43 PM	approaching New Mexico
12:58 PM	just inside Colorado
1:00 PM	near Telluride, Colorado
1:08 PM	near Montrose, Colorado
1:22 PM	Button begins a zig-zag pattern with this sighting between Grand Junction and Aspen, Colorado
1:27 PM	bearing to the northeast, Button is now north of Aspen
1:30 PM	Button is due south of his last position
1:33 PM	the A-10 is southeast of the last sighting
1:35 PM	north by northeast of its previous sighting, the A-10 is between Aspen and Grand Junction again
1:37 PM	Button is heading northeast again
1:40 PM	In the last reported sighting, Button is northeast of Aspen, near Craig's Peak and New York Mountain

=== Search and recovery ===
The search for the crash site was conducted by the USAF. The crew of a National Guard helicopter spotted metal fragments in the snow on Gold Dust Peak. Steep terrain, bad weather, high winds, deep snow, rock slides and avalanches hampered access to the site.

=== Status of the bombs ===
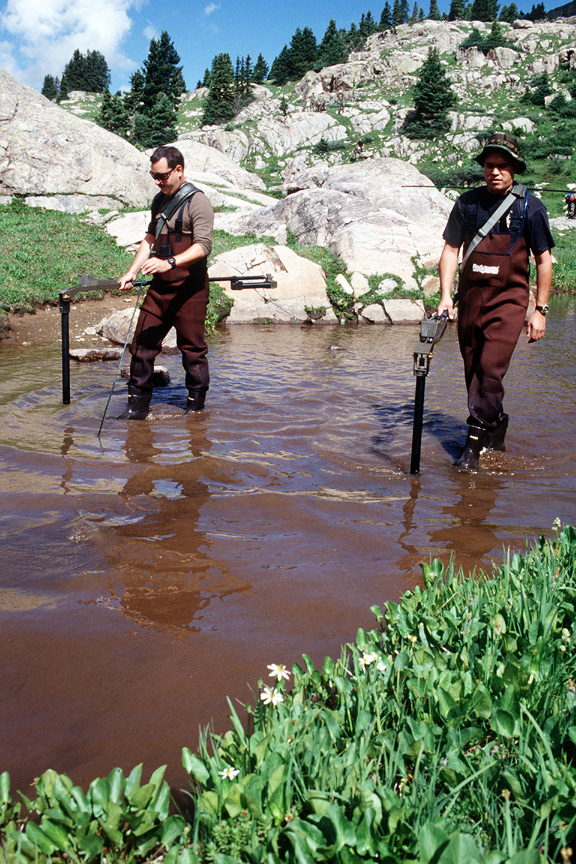
Explosive Ordnance Disposal personnel search alpine ponds for any remnants of the four 500-pound (230 kg) Mark 82 bombs in August 1997

The four 500-pound (230 kg) Mk 82 bombs have not been found despite an exhaustive search involving metal detectors and ground-penetrating radar. The bombs were designed to survive a crash and the USAF expected to find them at the site. Furthermore, the aircraft's bomb racks were recovered in the wreckage, and they indicated that the bombs had not been released. More than four dozen witnesses reported hearing loud explosions in northern Arizona and near Telluride and Aspen, Colorado, but no evidence was found to support the idea that Button released the weapons where the explosions were heard. The Mk 82 bomb can throw fragments more than a mile (1.6 km), and the crash site was less than 4000 feet (1.2 km) from a deep alpine lake.

=== In popular culture ===
Button's story was the inspiration for the plotline of a USAF pilot in the West Wing episode "Noël".
