= Mozambican Civil Aviation Institute =

The Mozambican Civil Aviation Institute (Instituto de Aviação Civil de Moçambique, IACM "Institute of Civil Aviation of Mozambique") is the civil aviation authority of Mozambique. As of 2013 João Abreu is the chairperson of the institute.

The Legislative Diploma No. 0315 of 22 August 1931 was the first law related to civil aviation. The Direcção de Exploração de Transportes Aéreos (DETA) was created in 1936. The Serviços da Aeronáutica Civil (SAC) was established in 1954.
