= Joseph-König-Gymnasium =

Secondary school in Haltern am See

Coordinates: 51.7389°N 7.1821°E

Location
- Holtwicker Straße 3–5; Haltern am See, North Rhine-Westphalia; Germany

Information
- Established: 1844; 182 years ago
- Principal: Christian Krahl
- Enrollment: 1,267 (as of March 25, 2015)
- Website: www.joseph-koenig-gymnasium.de

Joseph-König-Gymnasium is the only gymnasium in the Westphalian city of Haltern am See. With 1,360 students, it is one of the larger high schools in North Rhine-Westphalia. The school is named after the German chemist Joseph König. It continues tradition of 1844 founded 'Höhere Stadtschule' and later 'Städtisches Gymnasium Haltern'. It shares buildings with 'Alexander-Lebenstein-Realschule'.

On March 24, 2015, 16 of its students and two of its teachers were among the passengers murdered when the co-pilot of Germanwings Flight 9525 intentionally crashed into the French Alps. They were on their way home from a student exchange with the Giola Institute in Llinars del Vallès, Catalonia, Spain. Haltern's then mayor, Bodo Klimpel, has described it as "the darkest day in the history of our city".
