= Metzelder =

Metzelder is a surname. Notable people with the surname include:

- Christoph Metzelder (born 1980), German former footballer
- Malte Metzelder (born 1982), German footballer, brother of Christoph
