= Germanwings Flight 9525 =

2015 deliberate aircraft crash in France

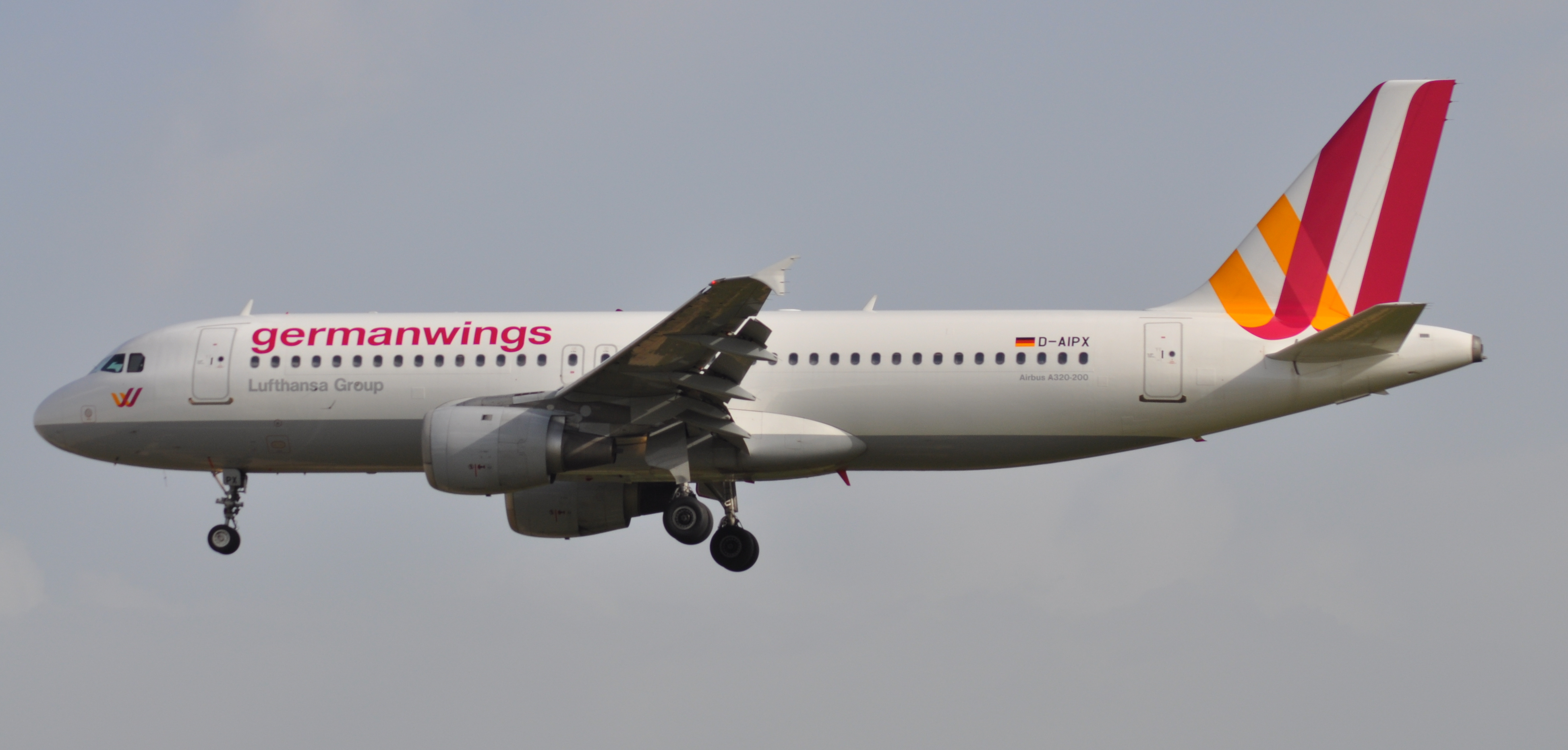
- D-AIPX, the aircraft involved, pictured in 2014

Occurrence
- Date: 24 March 2015
- Summary: Intentionally crashed into terrain by first officer
- Site: Prads-Haute-Bléone, Alpes-de-Haute-Provence, France; 44°16′48″N 6°26′20″E

Aircraft
- Aircraft type: Airbus A320-211
- Operator: Germanwings
- IATA flight No.: 4U9525 (Note: Abbreviated forms of the flight name combine the airline's IATA airline code (4U) or ICAO airline code (GWI) with the flight number.)
- ICAO flight No.: GWI18G
- Call sign: GERMANWINGS 18 GOLF
- Registration: D-AIPX
- Flight origin: Barcelona–El Prat Airport, El Prat de Llobregat, Catalonia, Spain
- Destination: Düsseldorf Airport, Lohausen, North Rhine-Westphalia, Germany
- Occupants: 150
- Passengers: 144
- Crew: 6
- Fatalities: 150
- Survivors: 0

Germanwings Flight 9525 was a scheduled international passenger flight from Barcelona–El Prat Airport in Spain to Düsseldorf Airport in Germany. The flight was operated by Germanwings, a low-cost carrier owned by the German airline Lufthansa. On 24 March 2015, the Airbus A320 operating the flight crashed 100 km (62 mi; 54 nmi) north-west of Nice in the French Alps, killing all 150 people on board.

The crash was deliberately caused by the first officer, Andreas Lubitz, who had previously been treated for suicidal tendencies and declared unfit to work by his doctor. Lubitz kept this information from his employer and instead reported for duty. Shortly after reaching cruise altitude and while the captain was out of the cockpit, Lubitz locked the cockpit door and set the plane to fly downward in a controlled descent into a mountain.

Aviation authorities swiftly implemented new recommendations from the European Union Aviation Safety Agency that required at least two authorised people to be in the cockpit at all times but, by 2017, this rule had been dropped.

By 2017, Lufthansa had paid €75,000 to the family of every victim, as well as €10,000 in pain and suffering compensation to every close relative of a victim.

== Flight ==
Flight path

Altitude chart (metres)

Germanwings Flight 9525 took off from Runway 06R at Barcelona–El Prat Airport on 24 March 2015 at 10:01 am CET (09:01 UTC), 26 minutes behind schedule. It was due to arrive at Düsseldorf Airport by 11:39 CET. According to the French national civil aviation inquiries bureau, the Bureau of Enquiry and Analysis for Civil Aviation Safety (BEA), the pilots confirmed instructions from French air traffic control at 10:30 CET.

At 10:31 CET, after crossing the French coast near Toulon, the aircraft left its assigned cruising altitude of 38,000 ft (11,600 m) and without approval began to descend rapidly. The air traffic controller declared the aircraft in distress after its descent and loss of radio contact.

The descent time from 38,000 ft was about 10 minutes; radar observed an average descent rate around 3,400 ft/min (57 ft/s; 17 m/s). Attempts by French air traffic control to contact the flight on the assigned radio frequency were not answered. A French Mirage fighter jet was scrambled from the Orange-Caritat Air Base to intercept the airliner. Radar contact was lost at 10:40 CET; at the time, the aircraft had descended to 6,175 feet (1,880 m), and crashed in the remote commune of Prads-Haute-Bléone, 100 km (62 mi; 54 nmi) north-west of Nice. A seismological station of the Sismalp network run by the Grenoble Observatory, 12 km (7.5 mi; 6.5 nmi) from the crash site, recorded the associated seismic event, determining the impact time as 10:41:05 CET.

=== Crash site ===
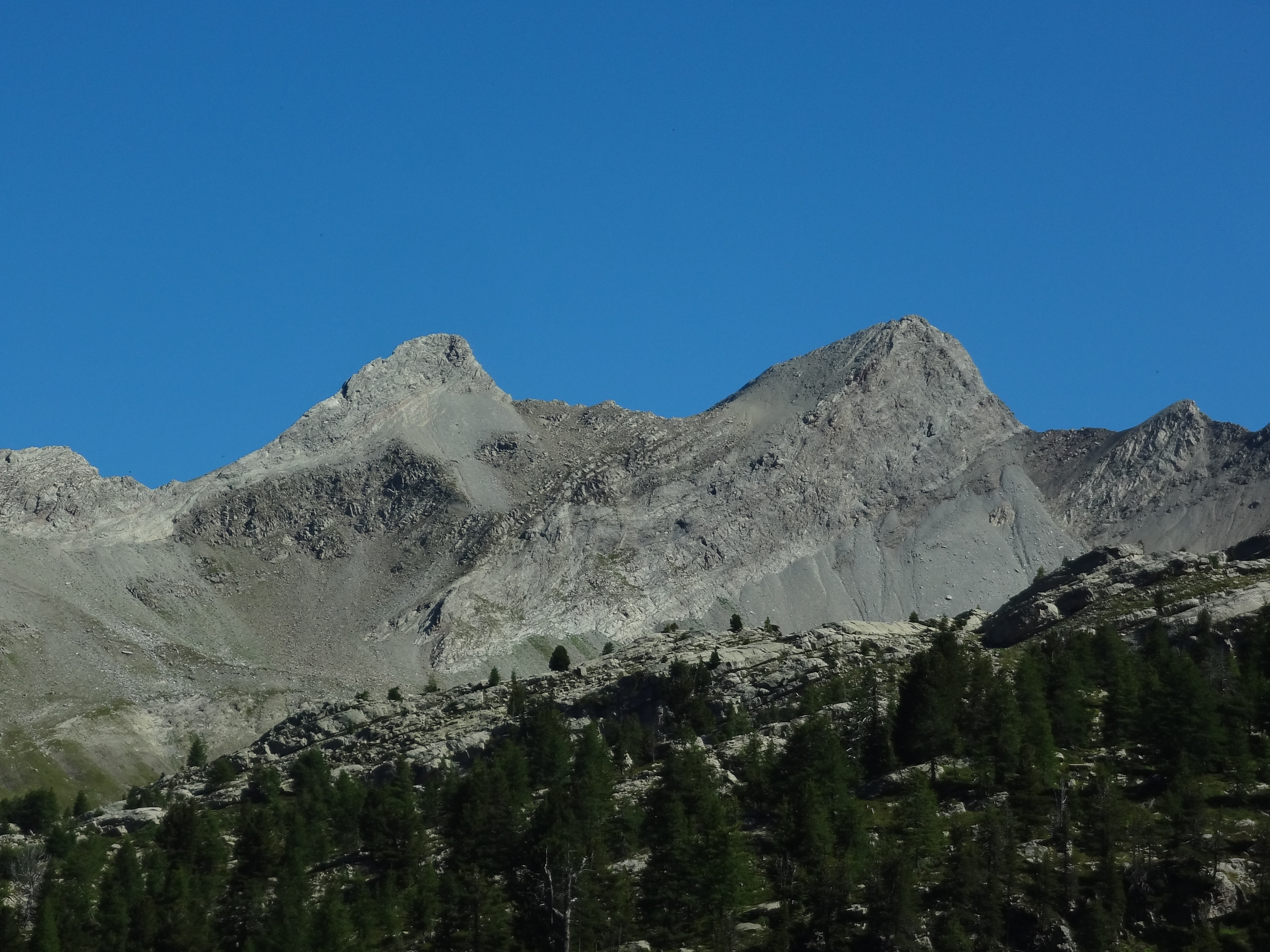
The Massif des Trois-Évêchés, the site of the crash

The crash site is within the Massif des Trois-Évêchés, 3 km (1.9 mi; 1.6 nmi) east of the settlement Le Vernet and beyond the road to the Col de Mariaud, in an area known as the Ravin du Rosé. The aircraft crashed on the southern side of the Tête du Travers, a minor peak in the lower western slopes of the Tête de l'Estrop, at an elevation of 1,550 m (5,090 ft). The aircraft was travelling at 700 km/h (380 kn; 435 mph) when it struck the mountain. The site is about 10 km (6 mi; 5 nmi) west of Mount Cimet, where Air France Flight 178 crashed in 1953.

Gendarmerie nationale and Sécurité Civile sent helicopters to locate the wreckage. The aircraft had disintegrated; the largest piece of wreckage was the size of a car. The signal recorded at the nearest seismological station shows that only 0.03% of the aircraft's kinetic energy was converted into seismic energy, the remainder (99.97%) generating a violent explosion in the open air. This phenomenon, probably due to the marly Callovian (mid-Jurassic) badlands found at the crash site, explains such a scattering of very small debris. A helicopter landed near the crash site; its personnel confirmed that there were no survivors. The search and rescue team reported the debris field covered 2 km^{2} (500 acres).

== Aircraft ==
The aircraft involved was an Airbus A320-211, (Note: The aircraft was an Airbus A320-200 model; the suffix '11' signifies it was fitted with CFM International CFM56-5A1 engines.) serial number 147, registered as D-AIPX. The aircraft had accumulated about 58,300 flight hours on 46,700 flights.

Deaths by citizenship
Citizenship	Deaths
Germany	72
Spain	50 (Note: Including 4 with dual citizenship: one British, one Israeli, one Mexican and one Moroccan)
Argentina	3
Kazakhstan	3
United States	3
Australia	2
Colombia	2
Iran	2
Japan	2
United Kingdom	2
Venezuela	2 (Note: Including 1 dual citizen of Venezuela and Chile)
Belgium	1
Denmark	1
Israel	1
Ivory Coast	1
Mexico	1
Morocco	1
Netherlands	1
Total	150

During its final flight, the aircraft was carrying 144 passengers and 6 crew (2 pilots and 4 cabin crew members) of 19 different nationalities.

=== Passengers and crew ===
Among the passengers were 16 students and 2 teachers from the Joseph-König-Gymnasium of Haltern am See, North Rhine-Westphalia. They were returning home from a student exchange with the Giola Institute in Llinars del Vallès, Barcelona. Haltern's mayor, Bodo Klimpel, described the crash as "the darkest day in the history of [the] town". Bass-baritone Oleg Bryjak and contralto Maria Radner, singers with Deutsche Oper am Rhein, were also on the flight. Among the passengers were two Iranian football journalists and analysts returning home after covering El Clásico between FC Barcelona and Real Madrid at Camp Nou. Also among the passengers was an American contractor for the satellite mapping office of the US Department of Defense, as well as an Israeli citizen who lived in Barcelona.

The flight's pilot in command was 34-year-old Captain Patrick Sondenheimer, who had 10 years' experience (6,000 flight hours, including 3,812 hours on the Airbus A320) flying A320s for Germanwings, Lufthansa, and Condor. The co-pilot was 27-year-old Andreas Lubitz, who joined Germanwings in September 2013 and had 630 flying hours, 540 of them on the Airbus A320.

==== Andreas Lubitz ====
Co-pilot Andreas Günter Lubitz (18 December 1987 — 24 March 2015), was raised in Neuburg an der Donau, Bavaria, and Montabaur in the German state of Rhineland-Palatinate. He took flying lessons at Luftsportclub Westerwald, an aviation sports club in Montabaur.

Lubitz was accepted into a Lufthansa trainee programme after finishing high school. In September 2008, he began training at the Lufthansa Flight Training school in Bremen, Germany. He suspended his pilot training in November 2008 after being hospitalised for a severe episode of depression. After his psychiatrist determined that the depressive episode was fully resolved, Lubitz returned to the Lufthansa school in August 2009. Lubitz moved to the United States in November 2010 to continue training at the Lufthansa Airline Training Center in Goodyear, Arizona. From June 2011 to December 2013, he worked as a flight attendant for Lufthansa while training to obtain his commercial pilot's licence, and joined Germanwings as a first officer in June 2014.

== Investigation ==
The French Bureau of Enquiry and Analysis for Civil Aviation Safety (BEA) opened an investigation into the crash; it was joined by its German counterpart, the Federal Bureau of Aircraft Accident Investigation (BFU). The BEA investigation was led by Arnaud Desjardin and was assisted by the United States Federal Bureau of Investigation. Hours after the crash, the BEA sent seven investigators to the site; these were accompanied by representatives from Airbus and CFM International. The cockpit voice recorder, which was damaged but still functional, was recovered by rescue workers and examined by the investigation team. The following week, Brice Robin, the government prosecutor based in Marseille, announced that the flight data recorder, blackened by fire but still usable, had also been found. Investigators isolated 150 sets of DNA, which were compared with the DNA of the victims' families.

=== Cause of crash ===
According to French and German prosecutors, the crash was an act of mass murder deliberately caused by the first officer, Andreas Lubitz. Robin said Lubitz was courteous to Captain Sondenheimer during the first part of the flight, then became "curt" when the captain began the midflight briefing on the planned landing. Robin said that when the captain left the cockpit, possibly to use the toilet, Lubitz locked the door and overrode the door code from the inside, preventing anyone from entering. The captain requested re-entry using the intercom; he knocked and then banged on the door, but received no response. The captain then tried to break down the door, but like most cockpit doors made after the September 11 attacks, it had been reinforced to prevent intrusion. During the descent, the co-pilot did not respond to questions from Marseille air traffic control, nor did he transmit a distress call. Robin said contact from the air traffic control tower, the captain's attempts to break in, and Lubitz's steady breathing were audible on the cockpit voice recording. The screams of passengers in the last moments before impact were also heard on the recording.

After their initial analysis of the aircraft's flight data recorder, the BEA concluded that Lubitz had made flight control inputs that led to the crash. He had set the autopilot to descend to 100 ft (30 m) and accelerated the speed of the descending aircraft several times thereafter. The BEA preliminary report into the crash was published six weeks later, on 6 May 2015. It confirmed the initial analysis of the aircraft's flight data recorder and revealed that during the earlier outbound Flight 9524 from Düsseldorf to Barcelona, Lubitz had practised setting the autopilot altitude dial to 100 ft several times while the captain was out of the cockpit.

The BEA final report into the crash was published on 13 March 2016. The report confirmed the findings made in the preliminary report and concluded that Lubitz had deliberately crashed the aircraft as a murder–suicide. The report stated:

The collision with the ground was due to the deliberate and planned action of the co-pilot, who decided to commit suicide while alone in the cockpit. The process for medical certification of pilots, in particular self-reporting in case of a decrease in medical fitness between two periodic medical evaluations, did not succeed in preventing the co-pilot, who was experiencing mental disorder with psychotic symptoms, from exercising the privilege of his license.

— Causes, BEA Final Report

=== Investigation of Lubitz ===
Three days after the crash, German detectives searched Lubitz's Montabaur properties and removed a computer and other items for testing. They did not find a suicide note nor any evidence that his actions had been motivated by "a political or religious background". During their search of Lubitz's apartment, detectives found a letter written by a doctor indicating Lubitz had been declared unfit to work. Germanwings stated it had not received a sick note from Lubitz for the day of the flight. News accounts said Lubitz was "hiding an illness from his employers". Under German law, employers do not have access to employees' medical records, and sick notes excusing people from work do not give information about medical conditions, so employers must rely on employees to declare their lack of work fitness.

The following day, authorities again searched Lubitz's home where they found evidence he suffered from a psychosomatic illness and had been prescribed two antidepressants, escitalopram and mirtazapine, and a sleep medication, zopiclone. Toxicological examination of Lubitz's post-mortem revealed the presence of all three. Escitalopram, a selective serotonin reuptake inhibitor, is associated with a risk of suicidal thoughts and behaviours, especially soon after treatment is commenced. Lubitz was prescribed escitalopram nine days before the crash. Criminal investigators said Lubitz had then, in the week before, researched online "ways to commit suicide" and "cockpit doors and their security provisions". Robin said doctors had told him Lubitz should not have been flying, but medical secrecy requirements prevented his physician from making this information available to Germanwings. Such secrecy should consider public safety, said BEA investigator Arnaud Desjardin.

The investigation into Lubitz revealed his treatment for suicidal tendencies prior to his training as a commercial pilot, when he had been temporarily denied a US pilot's licence because of treatments for psychotic depression. For years, Lubitz had frequently been unable to sleep because of what he believed were vision problems; he consulted over 40 doctors, fearing he was going blind. Motivated by the fear that blindness would cause him to lose his pilot's licence, he began conducting online research about methods of committing suicide before deciding to crash Flight 9525.

== Aftermath ==
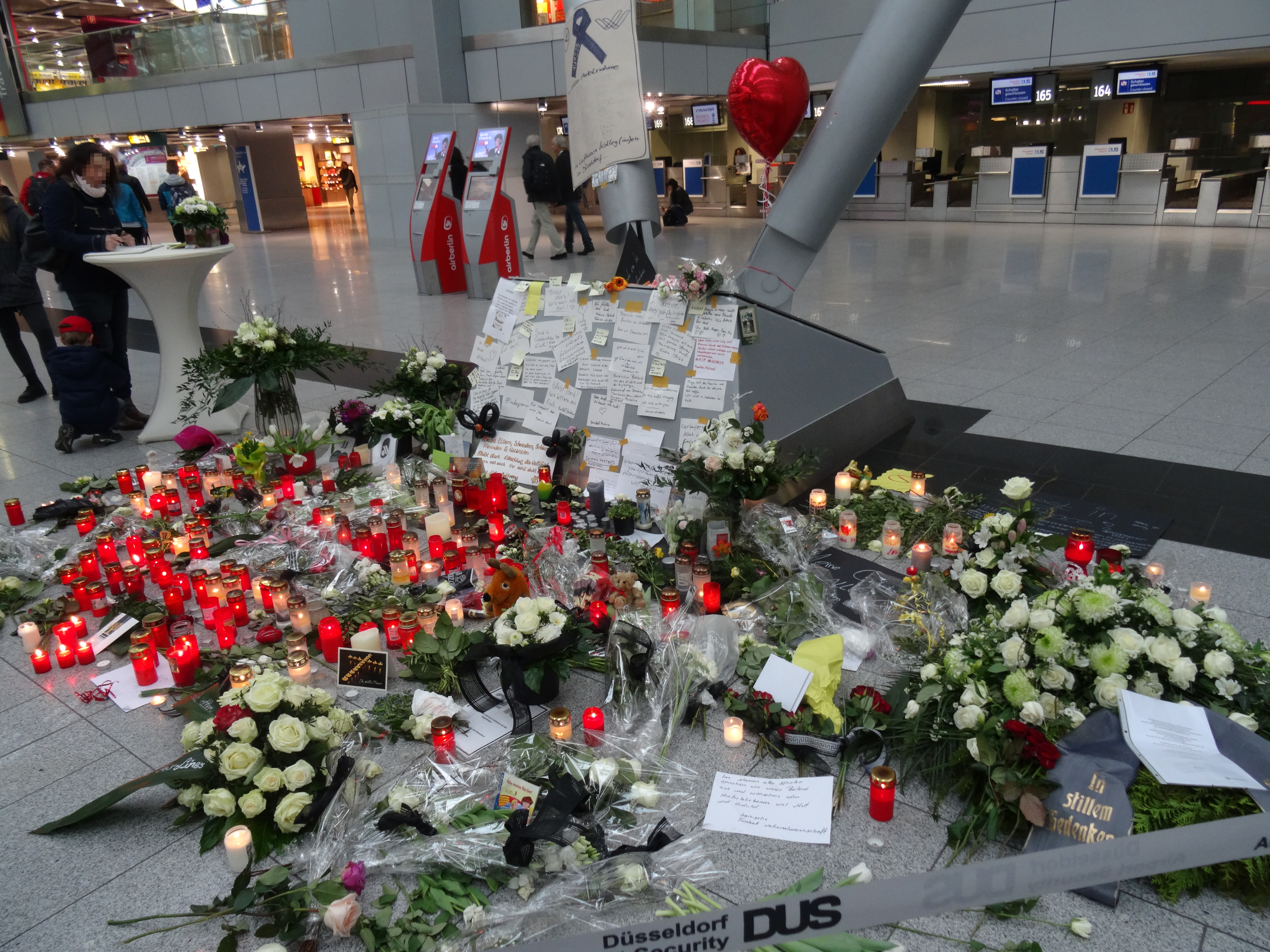
Memorial at Düsseldorf Airport

French Minister of the Interior Bernard Cazeneuve announced that due to the "violence of the impact", "little hope" existed that any survivors would be found. Then-Prime Minister Manuel Valls dispatched Cazeneuve to the scene and set up a ministerial task force to coordinate the response to the incident. German Foreign Minister Frank-Walter Steinmeier flew over the crash site, describing it as "a picture of horror". German Chancellor Angela Merkel and the minister-president of North Rhine-Westphalia Hannelore Kraft travelled to the crash site the following day. Merkel, Valls, and Spanish Prime Minister Mariano Rajoy visited the recovery operations base at Seyne-les-Alpes. Bodo Klimpel, mayor of Haltern am See, reacting to the deaths of 16 students and 2 teachers from the town, said that people were shocked by the crash.

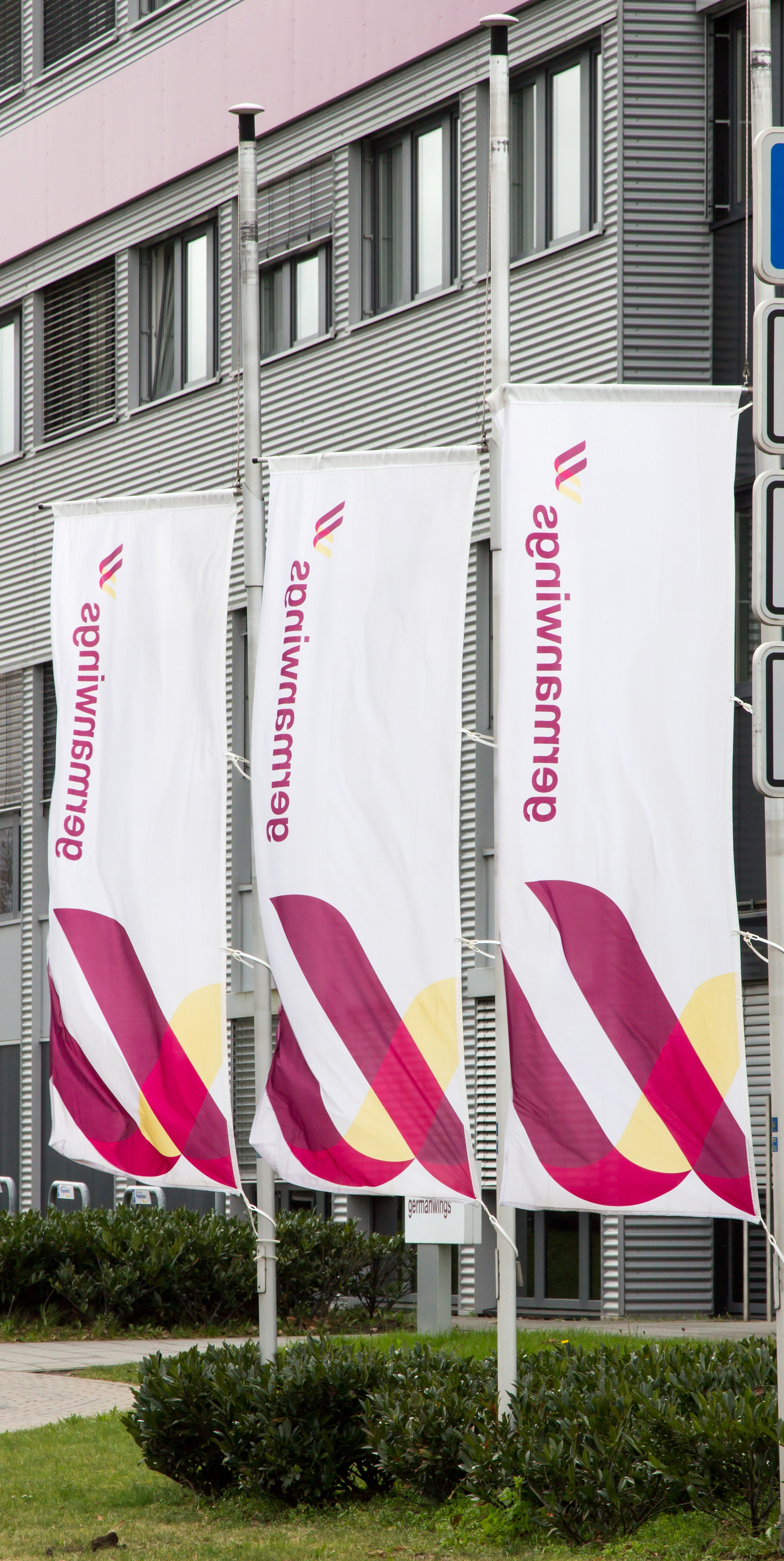
Germanwings headquarters in Cologne: flags at half-mast following loss of Flight 9525

Lufthansa chief executive officer Carsten Spohr visited the crash location the day following the crash; he said it was "the darkest day for Lufthansa in its 60-year history". Several Germanwings flights were cancelled on 24 and 25 March due to the pilots' grief at the murders and at the loss of their colleagues. Germanwings retired the flight number 4U9525, changing it to 4U9441; the outbound flight number was changed from 4U9524 to 4U9440. In the days following the crash, Lufthansa at first said it saw no reason to change its procedures, then reversed its earlier statement by introducing a new policy across its airlines requiring the presence of two crew members in the cockpit at all times.

=== Regulatory ===
In response to the incident and the circumstances of the co-pilot's involvement, aviation authorities in some countries implemented new regulations that require the presence of two authorised personnel in the cockpit at all times. Three days after the incident, the European Aviation Safety Agency issued a temporary recommendation for airlines to ensure that at least two crew members—including at least one pilot—were in the cockpit for the entire duration of the flight. Several airlines announced that they had already adopted similar policies voluntarily. But by 2016, the EASA stopped recommending the two-person rule, instead advising airlines to perform a risk assessment and decide for themselves whether to implement it. Germanwings and other German airlines dropped the procedure in 2017.

The British Psychological Society issued a statement offering expert support in psychological testing and monitoring of pilots. The European Federation of Psychologists' Associations issued a statement supporting psychological testing in the selection of pilots, but also stated it could not forecast the life events and mental health problems of individual pilots, nor could it predict the unique ways pilots would cope with these. It said priority should be given to psychological help for relatives and friends of victims in the aftermath of a disaster. CEO Spohr proposed random checks of pilots' psychological fitness and a loosening of the extant physician–patient confidentiality laws. Politicians began echoing the call to loosen the laws in exceptional cases.

The national police force in France, the National Gendarmerie, introduced a new set of support mechanisms to minimise the psychosocial risks to relief workers who deal with events such as Flight 9525 in their daily jobs.

=== Compensation and litigation ===
Germanwings' parent company Lufthansa offered victims' families an initial aid payment up to €50,000, separate from any legally required compensation for the disaster. Elmar Giemulla, a professor of aviation law at Technische Universität Berlin quoted by the Rheinische Post, said he expected the airline would pay a total of €10–30 million in compensation. The Montreal Convention sets a per-victim cap of €143,000 in the event an airline is held liable, unless negligence can be proven. Insurance specialists said although co-pilot Andreas Lubitz hid a serious illness from his employer and deliberately crashed the passenger aircraft, these facts would not affect the issue of compensation nor be applicable to the exclusion clause in Lufthansa's insurance policy. Lufthansa's insurance company set aside US$300 million (€280 million) for financial compensation to victims' families and for the cost of the aircraft. By 2017, Lufthansa had paid €75,000 to the family of every victim, as well as €10,000 in pain and suffering compensation to every close relative of a victim.

Victim families sued the Lufthansa Airline Training Center in Arizona to obtain higher compensation, but the case was reverted to German courts in March 2017. In July 2020, a court in Essen ruled against several victim families, holding that neither Lufthansa nor the training centre in Arizona could be held liable. Flight doctors who may have negligently authorised Lubitz to fly were working on behalf of the German government's flight authority, the Luftfahrt-Bundesamt. The ruling was upheld on appeal in September 2021. In November 2021, a coroner's inquest into the deaths of two British victims concluded with a verdict of unlawful killing.

=== Memorials ===
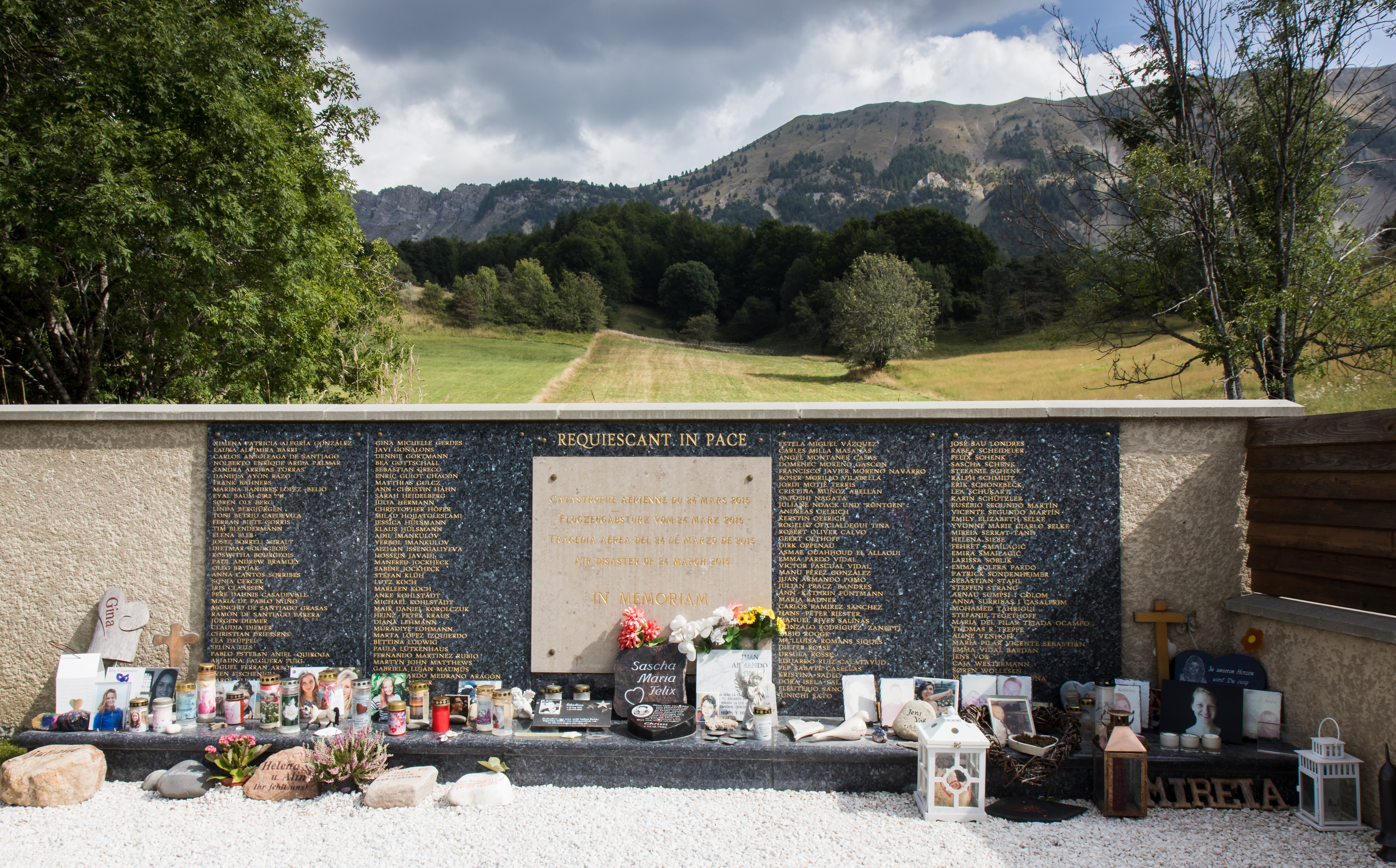
Mass grave in Le Vernet cemetery for the unidentifiable remains of the victims. The names of all 149 victims are engraved on the cemetery wall.

Shortly after the crash, a memorial stone in memory of the victims was erected near the crash site in Le Vernet. The following month, about 1,400 relatives of victims, senior politicians, rescue workers, and airline employees attended a memorial service at Cologne Cathedral. The parents of Andreas Lubitz were invited to the service but did not attend.

The remains of 15 of the 16 school children and their 2 teachers arrived in their home town of Haltern for burial two months after the crash. Residents held white roses as the hearses passed the children's school, where 18 trees—one for each victim—had been planted as a memorial. In Düsseldorf on the same day, the remains of 44 of the 72 German victims arrived for burial. Errors on the victims' death certificates had caused a delay. The local branch of the German Life Saving Association in Haltern named two of their rescue boats after two of the victims who were members of it.

In September 2017, a sculpture called Sonnenkugel ("Sunsphere") was installed at the site of the crash. The sculpture consists of 149 gold-coloured aluminium plates which form a sphere around a crystal-shaped column. The column holds 149 wooden spheres, which in turn hold personal mementos provided by the victims' family members.

On 24 March 2025, the tenth anniversary of the crash, memorial services were held in France, Germany, and Spain. To mark the anniversary, German public broadcaster ARD released a four-part true-crime documentary in German entitled "Der Germanwings-Absturz" ('The Germanwings Crash').

=== Lubitz family response ===
The Lubitz family held a press conference on 24 March 2017, two years to the day after the crash. Lubitz's father, Günter Lubitz, said the family did not accept the official investigative findings that Andreas Lubitz deliberately caused the crash or that he had been depressed at the time. Aviation journalist Tim van Beveren published a report which asserted that Lubitz could have fallen unconscious, that the cockpit door lock had malfunctioned on previous flights, and that potentially dangerous turbulence had been reported in the area on the day of the crash. Van Beveren had been commissioned by the family and was present at the press conference. The timing of the press conference by Lubitz's father, on the anniversary of the crash, was criticised by families of the victims, who were holding their own remembrances on that day.

== Media depictions ==
The crash was dramatised in season 16 of the Canadian TV series Mayday in an episode entitled "Murder in the Skies". The episode aired on 24 January 2017.

== See also ==
- List of declared or suspected pilot suicides
- List of accidents and incidents involving the Airbus A320 family
- List of aircraft accidents and incidents resulting in at least 50 fatalities
- LAM Mozambique Airlines Flight 470
- SilkAir Flight 185
- Flydubai Flight 1073
