= Joseph König (chemist) =

German chemist (1843–1930)

Franz Joseph König (15 November 1843 – 12 April 1930) was a German chemist noted among other things as the founder of German food chemistry. He developed many analytical techniques and created the foundations for the modern quality control of foodstuffs.

== Life ==
König was born in Lavesum, Haltern, North Rhine-Westphalia. He studied at the Georg-August-Universität Göttingen and was a member of the Corps Verdensia (1866) and Hercynia (1922). He was awarded a D.Phil.

In 1871 he became director of the newly established agricultural research station in Münster. In 1892 he was elected honorary professor at the Münster Royal Academy (Königliche Akademie zu Münster) and in 1899 was appointed to a chair at the present Westfälische Wilhelms-Universität. In 1887 he was elected a member of the Leopoldina.

He was appointed a Geheimer Regierungsrat.

König died on 12 April 1930 in Münster.

== Commemorations ==
- In 1934 the Joseph König Memorial Medal (Joseph-König-Gedenkmünze) of the Food Chemistry Society (Lebensmittelchemische Gesellschaft), a specialist group within the Gesellschaft Deutscher Chemiker, was endowed.
- The Agricultural Investigation and Research Institute of North Rhine-Westphalia (Landwirtschaftliche Untersuchungs- und Forschungsanstalt Nordrhein-Westfalen) was renamed on the occasion of its 110th birthday as the "Joseph-König-Institut".
- The secondary school of Haltern was named the Joseph-König-Gymnasium in his honour in 2003.

== Works ==
- Chemie der menschlichen Nahrungs- und Genußmittel 1878
- Chemische Zusammensetzung der menschlichen Nahrungs- und Genussmittel (= Chemie der menschlichen Nahrungs- und Genussmittel. Bd. 1). Springer, Berlin 1879. 4th improved edition edited by A. Bömer. Springer, Berlin 1903
- Die menschlichen Nahrungs- und Genussmittel, ihre Herstellung, Zusammensetzung und Beschaffenheit, nebst einem Abriss über die Ernährunglehre (= Chemie der menschlichen Nahrungs- und Genussmittel. Bd. 2). Springer, Berlin 1880. 4th improved edition. Springer, Berlin 1904

== Sources ==
- Heinz Walter (1980). "König, Joseph". Neue Deutsche Biographie (in German). Vol. 12. Berlin: Duncker & Humblot. pp. 343–344. (full text online).
- Johann Grossfeld: Joseph König (Münster i. W.): Sein Leben u. s. Arbeit; Zur Erinnerg an s. 85. Geburtstag am 15. Nov. 1928, edited together with his sons Friedrich König and Maximilian König, Berlin: P. Parey 1928 (Reihe Die landwirtschaftliche Versuchs-Stationen; Bd. 108, Erg. Bd.)
