= Oleg Bryjak =

Ukrainian opera singer (1960–2015)

- Олег Брижак
- Born: 27 October 1960; Jezkazgan, Kazakh SSR, Soviet Union
- Died: 24 March 2015 (aged 54); Prads-Haute-Bléone, France
- Occupation: Opera singer
- Employer: Deutsche Oper am Rhein

Oleg Bryjak (Ukrainian: Олег Брижак, 27 October 1960 – 24 March 2015) was a Kazakhstani-German bass-baritone opera singer. Born in Jezkazgan, Kazakh SSR, into an ethnic Ukrainian family, he moved to Germany in 1991 to join the Badisches Staatstheater Karlsruhe. From 1996 until his death, he was a soloist with the Deutsche Oper am Rhein in Düsseldorf.

Bryjak had been a protodeacon in a Ukrainian Orthodox church in Krefeld.

Bryjak died on 24 March 2015 along with his colleague Maria Radner and 148 others when Germanwings Flight 9525 was deliberately crashed by its co-pilot in Prads-Haute-Bléone, France, during their return from performances of Richard Wagner's Siegfried at the Gran Teatre del Liceu in Barcelona.

== Notable recordings ==
- Leoš Janáček: Káťa Kabanová – Karita Mattila (Katia), Bryjak (Dikoj), Chorus and Orquesta del Teatro Real; Jiří Bělohlávek (conductor), Robert Carsen (director). Recorded at Teatro Real, Madrid, December 2008. Fra Musica (Harmonia Mundi) FRA003 (DVD).
