= Malte Metzelder =

German footballer

Personal information
- Full name: Jan Malte Metzelder
- Date of birth: 19 May 1982 (age 44)
- Place of birth: Haltern, West Germany
- Height: 1.95 m (6 ft 5 in)
- Position: Centre back

Youth career
- 1986–1997: TuS Haltern
- 1997–1998: SpVgg Erkenschwick
- 1998–2001: Preußen Münster

Senior career*
Years	Team	Apps	(Gls)
2001–2003	Preußen Münster	52	(0)
2003–2005	Borussia Dortmund II	24	(0)
2003–2005	Borussia Dortmund	9	(0)
2005–2007	VfR Aalen	44	(1)
2007–2014	Ingolstadt 04	109	(7)
Total		238	(8)
- * Club domestic league appearances and goals

Jan Malte Metzelder (born 19 May 1982) is a German former professional footballer who played as a centre-back.

He appeared in the Bundesliga for Borussia Dortmund, but spent most of his career in the lower leagues.

== Football career ==
Born in Haltern, North Rhine-Westphalia, Metzelder made his professional debut with SC Preußen Münster in 2001, and two years later moved to Borussia Dortmund to play alongside his older brother Christoph. However, he appeared very rarely for the first team, amassing only nine Bundesliga appearances – all in 2003–04 – and adding two minutes in a 2–1 away win against FK Austria Wien for the UEFA Cup.

In 2005, Metzelder left Dortmund and joined VfR Aalen in the Regionalliga Süd (then third division). Two years later he stayed in that tier, being instrumental in FC Ingolstadt 04's promotion to the second level in his first season; he left the latter club in July 2014 at the age of 32, after no competitive appearances whatsoever in his last two years.

== Personal life ==
Metzelder's older brother, Christoph, was also a footballer (and a centre back), and both played for Borussia Dortmund, with his sibling also playing three years at Real Madrid and representing Germany on about 50 occasions, helping the team finish second at the 2002 FIFA World Cup.
