= Maria Radner =

German opera singer (1981–2015)

- Radner c. 2011
- Born: Maria Friderike Radner; 7 May 1981; Düsseldorf, West Germany
- Died: 24 March 2015 (aged 33); Prads-Haute-Bléone, Alpes-de-Haute-Provence, France
- Education: Robert Schumann Hochschule
- Occupation: Classical contralto
- Website: www.ia-ac.com/MariaRadner (archived)

Maria Friderike Radner (German: [ˈʁaːdnɐ]; 7 May 1981 – 24 March 2015) was a German contralto who performed internationally in opera and in concerts. She studied at the Robert Schumann Hochschule in Düsseldorf. She was described as an "extremely talented interpreter of Wagner's music" by Stern magazine and Abendzeitung. Possessing the "rare pitch of a true alto", she frequently appeared as Erda in Wagner's Der Ring des Nibelungen at the Leipzig Opera, Schwertleite in Die Walküre at the Teatro Comunale di Firenze with Zubin Mehta, and in Mahler's Symphony No. 2 (Resurrection) conducted by Antonio Pappano in Rome and Milan. Her debut at the Metropolitan Opera in 2012 in Götterdämmerung was part of that company's documentary Wagner's Dream.

Radner, her husband, her infant son and colleague Oleg Bryjak were among the 150 people murdered in March 2015 when Germanwings Flight 9525 was deliberately crashed by its co-pilot, Andreas Lubitz.

== Early life and education (1981–2000) ==
Maria Friderike Radner was born in Düsseldorf and had a brother, Bozidar, and a sister, Anna. Her parents had immigrated from Austria and started a trading company. They were not particularly interested in music. During long drives to Austria, Maria would sing for hours. At school, she was a "rather unobtrusive, popular student" who enjoyed music lessons but found mathematics difficult. Her talent for singing remained unnoticed at school, but when she was 14, her parents introduced her to voice teacher Angelo Melzani, who told her, "I will get you into opera." As a teen, she took part in the Rhenish Carnival and the Largest Fair on the Rhine (Große Rheinkirmes). Her father remembered her calling him excitedly after winning first prize in a beer-tent karaoke competition. She attended St. Ursula Gymnasium in Düsseldorf, finishing in 2000.

== Vocal education (2000–2008) ==
Radner pursued German studies for one semester, but left because she disliked it. She started training in an import–export business and had the best grades at the vocational school, but felt that it did not suit her. She applied to the Robert Schumann Hochschule for music in Düsseldorf and was one of seven selected from 200 applicants. Her voice teacher, Michaela Krämer, considered her to be a mezzo-soprano. Radner's father obtained additional voice lessons for her with Jeannette Zarou in Düsseldorf and later with mezzo-soprano Marga Schiml, both experts in early music and Lieder, who recognized her as a contralto. Radner's mother died in 2003 after a long illness. Almost a year later, Radner earned her diploma. In the 2006 Bundeswettbewerb Gesang Berlin, she won the €3,000 third prize in the concert category and a scholarship from the Richard Wagner Society in Bayreuth to attend the 2007 Bayreuth Festival. In the concert division of the 2007 Cantilena Singing Competition, she placed second out of 120 vocalists from 19 countries. In 2008, she played Cornelia in Handel's Giulio Cesare in Egitto at the Theater Hagen. It was to be her only engagement as an ensemble member at a theatre. She decided that it was "not her world" because she wanted to earn more, and she went independent. Radner was still a student in 2008 when she made her first public appearance under Zubin Mehta at the Palau de les Arts Reina Sofia in Valencia, singing Martin y Soler's oratorio Philitaei a Jonatha disperse. She gave a recital in June 2008.

In August 2008, Radner performed the title role in Handel's Solomon at the Bregenzer Festspiele. Local newspapers praised her as "outshining" the other, more established British soloists (Vorarlberger Nachrichten, 19 August 2008) and as possessing the "rare pitch of a true alto, having an impressive charisma and great musicality" (Vorarlberger Neue Tageszeitung, 20 August 2008). In 2009, she performed in a new production of Parsifal under Lorin Maazel in Valencia and in Arthur Honegger's Jeanne d'Arc au bûcher under the direction of Antonio Pappano at Accademia Nazionale di Santa Cecilia in Rome.

== Career (2009–2015) ==
After graduating with distinction, Radner performed Schumann's Faust scenes under Jesús López-Cobos at the Teatro Real Madrid. She sang in Beethoven's Symphony No. 9 conducted by Gianandrea Noseda at the Teatro Regio Torino. She performed a recital at Wahnfried on 16 August 2009 with works by Schubert, Brahms, Liszt and Wagner's Wesendonck Lieder. In December 2009, she sang the third lady in Mozart's Die Zauberflöte under Tomáš Netopil at the Bayerische Staatsoper in Munich in five performances. The conductor Sir Simon Rattle cast her as First Norn and Flosshilde in Götterdämmerung at the 2009 Festival d’Aix-en-Provence and again at the Salzburger Osterfestspiele in 2010.

In 2009 and 2010, Radner was part of a new production of Stravinsky's Rossignol by the Canadian Opera Company in Toronto. She then sang Beethoven's Missa Solemnis under Philippe Herreweghe at the Concertgebouw Amsterdam.

In 2010, she gave her first performance as Erda in a concert adaptation of Das Rheingold at the Leipzig Opera, a role she performed every year from then until her death. In the same year, she sang in Mahler's Symphony No. 2 (the Resurrection) under Pappano in Rome and Milan. In the summer of 2010, she was part of a new production of Elektra at her first summer Salzburg Festival under Daniele Gatti and Die Frau ohne Schatten, conducted by Christian Thielemann. In October 2010, she appeared as Dryad in Ariadne auf Naxos at the Theater an der Wien, conducted by Bertrand de Billy.

Radner performed the third lady in Die Zauberflöte at La Scala, conducted by Roland Böer and recorded on DVD, during March and April 2011, and Rheingold's Erda in Essen conducted by Stefan Soltesz in April. At the Salzburg Festival in July and August she was "a voice from above" and a servant in Richard Strauss's Die Frau ohne Schatten under Christian Thielemann. She performed Martha in Tchaikovsky's Iolanta and "death" in Le Rossignol, both under Ivor Bolton. In November 2011, she sang Siegfried's Erda in Leipzig under Ulf Schirmer.

In January 2012, Radner made her debut at the Metropolitan Opera in New York City in Götterdämmerung. The production was documented in the film Wagner's Dream by Robert Lepage and the 11 February 2012 performance was recorded and broadcast by radio. In March 2012, she participated in Die Frau ohne Schatten at La Scala under Marc Albrecht. In the fall of 2012, she was at the Royal Opera House in London performing in three Wagner operas conducted by Pappano: the Erda in Siegfried and Rheingold during September and October, and the first norn in Götterdämmerung during October and November 2012. She sang in Dvorak's Requiem under Tomas Netopil in Lyon, and in Mahler's Symphony No. 3 under Sebastian Weigle in Frankfurt am Main.

In January 2013, Radner appeared as the valkyrie Schwertleite in Die Walküre at the Teatro Comunale di Firenze under Zubin Mehta, and in March she again portrayed Erda in Das Rheingold, conducted by Ingo Metzmacher at the Grand Théâtre de Genève. She traveled to Bucharest in September, where she sang Erda in a concert performance of Das Rheingold with the Radio Symphony Orchestra Berlin under the direction of Marek Janowski. The 2013–2014 season also included Dvorak's Stabat Mater with Santa Cecilia in Rome under Netopil.

From January to May 2014, in Geneva, Radner performed Erda in Siegfried, and in May in Das Rheingold conducted by Metzmacher. In April 2014, she performed as Anna in the Berlioz opera Les Troyens at La Scala under Pappano.

Radner gave her final performance as the earth goddess Erda on 23 March 2015 in Wagner's Siegfried at the Gran Teatre del Liceu in Barcelona. She had been scheduled to appear at Bayreuth in the summer of 2015.

== Personal life ==
Radner's former colleague, the opera singer Karen Cargill, recalled her friend a few days after her death:

"Maria was an incredible musician who you felt spoke directly to you – she was a true communicator. Her voice had a beautiful bronzed hue, full and round; the warmth of her personality always shone through. She loved singing, it was who she was. A more elegant and poised woman you couldn't hope to find and yet underneath was someone whose laughter was deep, guttural and contagious, who loved cheesy pop music and had the stamina to dance all night. Her delightfully wicked sense of humour was infectious."

Karen Cargill, quoted on 26 March 2015

Scottish mezzo-soprano Karen Cargill summarized "Maria Radner, my beloved friend" in The Guardian: "She was the most generous-spirited person I have ever met. Hysterical laughter, an obsession with all things Burberry, unadulterated passion for Bayern Munich and the warmest of hugs were things you could always be guaranteed of when you were with her. Her son and partner were her whole life." Further down Cargill qualified the latter, in that "Music was Maria's entire life until she met her partner and they had their son."

The authors of an article in the German weekly Stern echoed this sentiment when they wrote that "Radner was a happy mother. Radner had a side, that many internationally successful opera stars are not privy to: her own family." Stern described photos of her private life, published one week prior in Bild, showing the young woman embraced by her partner Sascha Schenk in the soccer stadium with a scarf of FC Bayern Munich, and him holding their infant son, who is sitting on a motorbike. Stern wrote that "privately Radner was able to simply be Maria, the wife of insurance specialist Sascha S."

According to Opernnetz "Radner had moved with [Schenk] to Wuppertal-Cronenberg." Bild wrote – incorrectly – "They lived in Mettmann. She was travelling a lot professionally, while he looked after his insurance clients in Wuppertal." Radner and Schenk had one son, Felix, born on 12 September 2013.

== Death ==
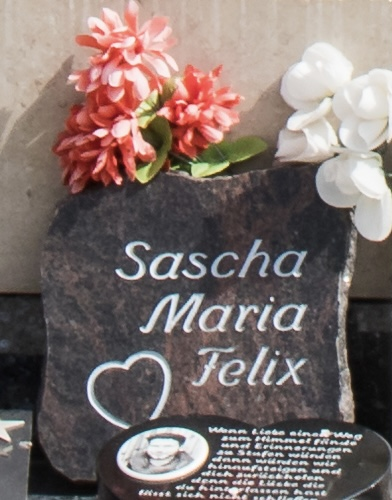
Memorial stone for Radner, Sascha Schenk and their son Felix in the communal cemetery of Le Vernet

Radner died on 24 March 2015, along with her husband Sascha Schenk, their 18-month-old son Felix, and her colleague Oleg Bryjak, when Germanwings Flight 9525 crashed near Prads-Haute-Bléone, Alpes-de-Haute-Provence, France. The First Officer, who had a history of depression, barricaded himself into the cockpit and deliberately crashed the plane into the mountains. They were en route to Düsseldorf after Radner's and Bryjak's two performances in Wagner's Siegfried at the Gran Teatre del Liceu in Barcelona.

Radner's voice teacher Michaela Krämer said "she was a magnificent artist and yet remained unassuming, helpful and natural".

The Metropolitan Opera issued a brief statement, mourning her "untimely and tragic death" and calling her "a gifted artist who touched the lives of many". The Deutsche Oper am Rhein expressed sympathy.

== Discography ==
- Rundfunk-Sinfonieorchester Berlin Choir / Wagner – Richard Wagner: Das Rheingold. 28 May 2013. PentaTone Classics.
- Gürzenich-Orchester Köln / Markus Stenz, conductor: Gustav Mahler: Symphony No. 8. Oehms Classics; recording of a September 2011 live performance in the Philharmonie Köln. Maria Radner as Maria Egyptiaca (Part 2, Acta Sanctorum).
