= Alexander Lebenstein =

German-American Holocaust survivor (1927–2010)

Alexander Lebenstein (November 3, 1927 – 28 January 2010) was a German-American Holocaust survivor. He was the sole surviving Jew in the Shoah from Haltern am See. The Alexander-Lebenstein junior high school in his hometown is named after him.

== Life ==
=== Childhood ===
He was born on November 3, 1927, at the family home Disselhof 36 in Haltern and experienced in his own words, a sheltered childhood until age 11. His mother, Lottie Joseph from Jever, Oldenburg, and his father, Nathan Lebenstein, operated cattle trade and kosher and non-kosher butcher shop. His father had served in World War I for the German army. Alexander had three older sisters; one of them died in 1932, the other two emigrated in 1939 in the United States.

=== National Socialism ===
During Kristallnacht in 1938 his family was hiding; shortly after Lebenstein and his family were brought to a Jewish house in Haltern. In January 1942, they came to the warehouse (former exhibition hall on the "Wildenbruchplatz") to Gelsenkirchen. From there they were deported to Riga, where his father fell seriously ill and was soon killed by SS troops.

In spring 1942, he became separated from his mother and shipped to Lithuania. When he returned in the fall, his mother was gone. After the war, he found out that she had been shot in a forest near Riga, and was buried. After that Lebenstein was in several labor camps and was finally brought with a ferry to the Stutthof concentration camp in Gdańsk.

In 1945, the Russians liberated the camp, he was sent in a hospital in Gdańsk because of his bad health condition. He fled with two men via Frankfurt (Oder) to Berlin, because they refused to join the Red Army. They were not welcome even by the Americans because the Russians had been looking after them. This is why Lebenstein went back to his birthplace Haltern, where he was compelled to leave the city again. He was denied German citizenship and came to Deggendorf (Bavaria) in a DP camp.

=== Death ===
Until his death on 28 January 2010, Lebenstein lived near Richmond, Virginia. He died at the age of 82 in the same city.

== Honours ==
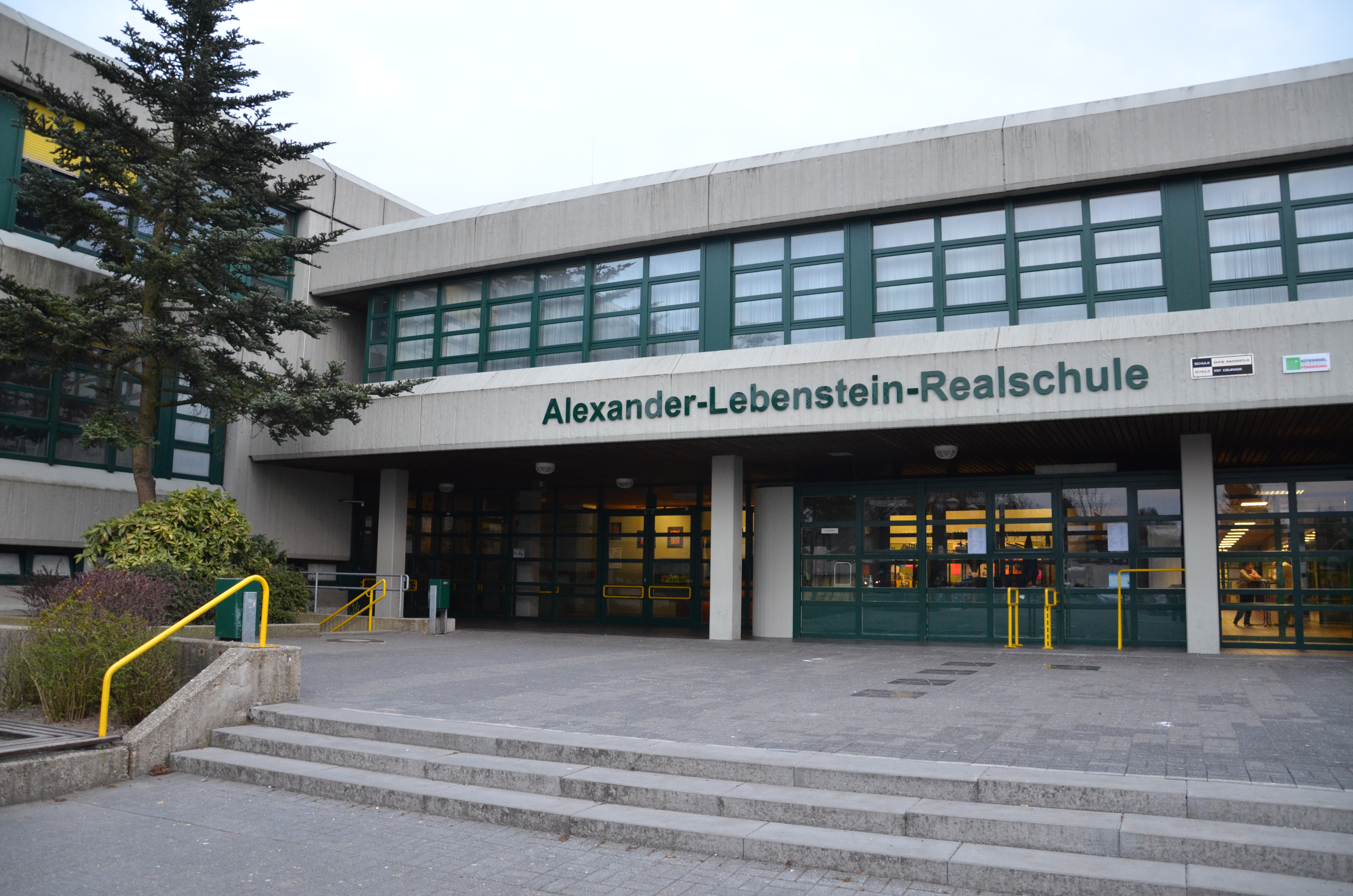
nach ihm benannte Realschule

- In 2003, he took over the sponsorship for the school in Haltern am See, now called the Alexander-Lebenstein-Junior-high-school.
- On June 5, 2008, he was awarded for his engagement for the honorary citizenship of the city Haltern am See.
- In 2009, the Virginia Center for Inclusive Communities recognized Lebenstein with the Richmond Chapter Humanitarian Award.

== Foundation ==
The Alexander-Lebenstein-school was considered in the estate of its namesake with $30,000. Together with donations and grants that money was transferred (as earmarked named funds) within the Community Foundation "Halterns for Halterns." Its purpose is the promotion "of particularly sustained, long-term projects, activities and initiatives that contribute to overcome discrimination and racism, recurring project days to commemorate the events of the Holocaust, initiatives that contribute to the understanding of all people and cultures and promote awareness of tolerance, a life of mutual respect and dignity.

== Literature ==
- With the help of the author Don Alexander Levin, Alexander Lebenstein published in 2008 his autobiography under the title The Gazebo in the United States.
