= Sythen =

- Village of Haltern am See
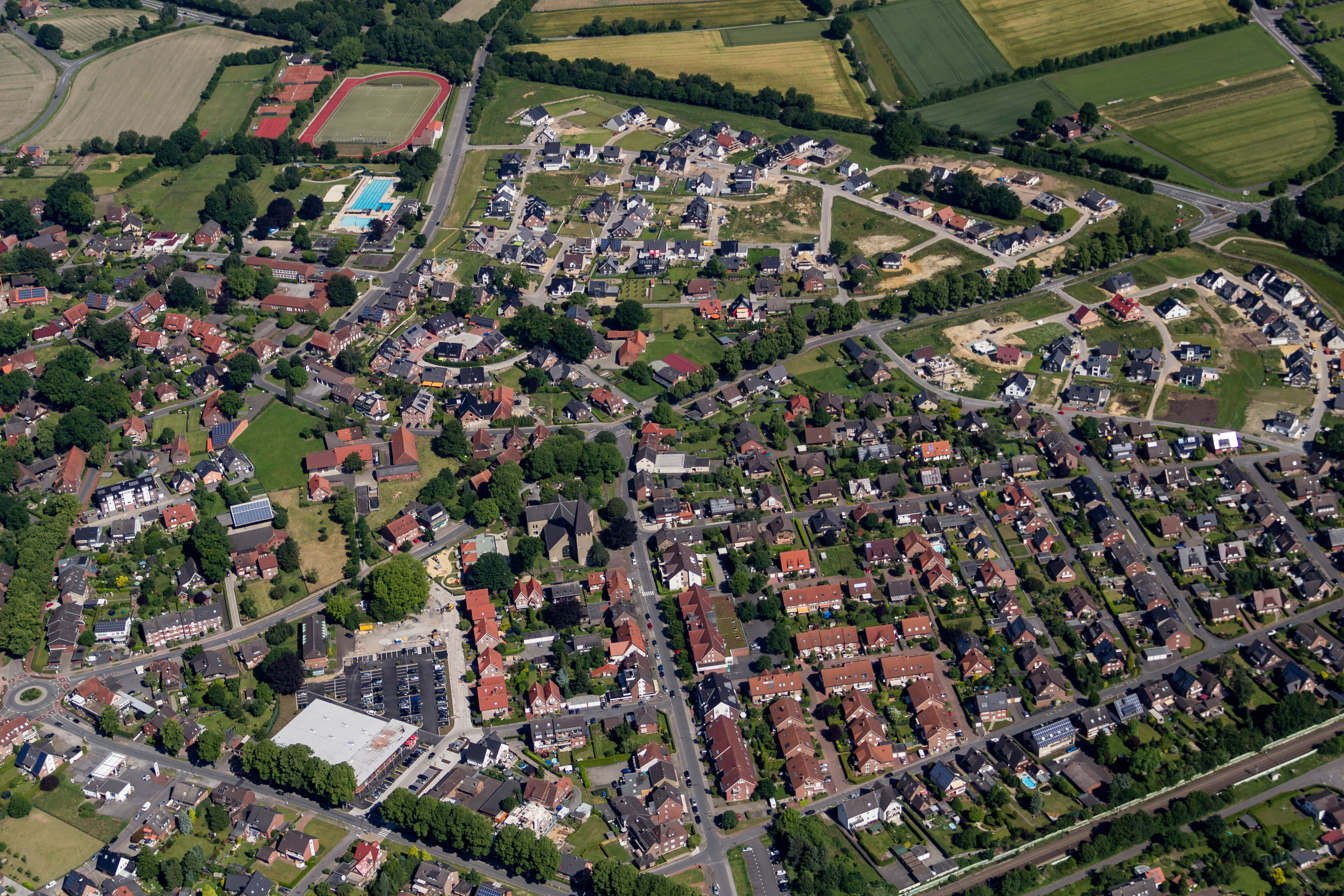
- Sythen seen from above
- Interactive map of Sythen
- Location within Germany Location within North Rhine-Westphalia
- Coordinates: 51°46′23″N 07°13′22″E
- Country: Germany
- State: North Rhine-Westphalia
- Admin. region: Münster
- District: Recklinghausen
- Town: Haltern am See

Area
  - Total: 3,283 km^{2} (1,268 sq mi)
- Elevation: 45 m (148 ft)

Population (2024-04-30)
  - Total: 6,360
  - Density: 1.94/km^{2} (5.02/sq mi)
- Time zone: UTC+01:00 (CET)
  - Summer (DST): UTC+02:00 (CEST)
- Postal codes: 45721
- Dialling codes: 02364
- Vehicle registration: RE

Sythen (German pronunciation: [ˈziːtən]) is the largest village in the town Haltern am See. It lies on the northern border of the Recklinghausen district and the Ruhr area directly bordering Dülmen and Lüdinghausen, towns both in the Coesfeld district.

== Location ==
The Village lies at the border between the Ruhr area in the south and the Münsterland in the north. It is approximately 4 km from Haltern am See, 7 km from Dülmen and 15 km from Lüdinghausen.

== History ==
The village was first mentioned in the year 758 as Sitina and played an important role in battles between the Franks and Saxons. The Sythener Hellweg which was an important trading and travel route connecting Haltern with Dülmen ran through the village and was named after it.

== Transport ==
Sythen has several busses running across the village to Haltern am See and a railway station with regularly scheduled RE 42 trains running all day and RE 2 trains running between 22:00 and 7:00
