= Haltern am See =

Town in Münster, Germany

- Town
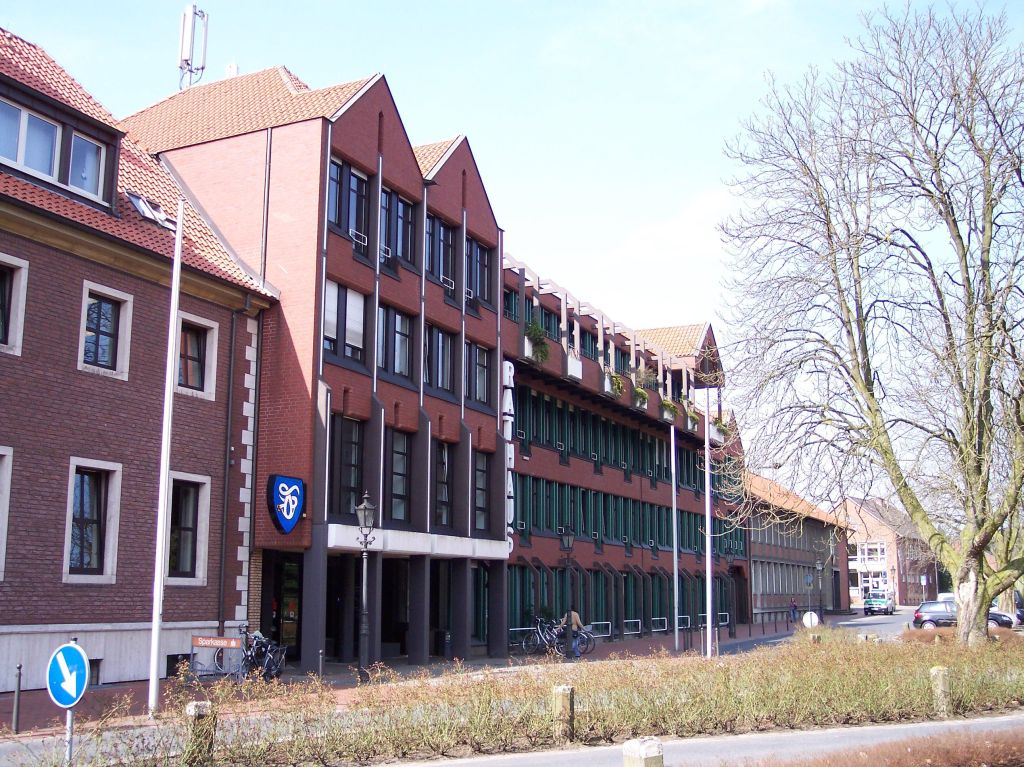
- New town hall

- Coat of arms

- Location of Haltern am See within Recklinghausen district
- Interactive map of Haltern am See
- Location within Germany Location within North Rhine-Westphalia
- Coordinates: 51°45′N 7°11′E
- Country: Germany
- State: North Rhine-Westphalia
- Admin. region: Münster
- District: Recklinghausen
- Founded: 1289

Government
  - Mayor (2020–25): Andreas Stegemann (CDU)

Area
  - Total: 159.03 km^{2} (61.40 sq mi)
- Elevation: 40 m (130 ft)

Population (2025-12-31)
  - Total: 38,029
  - Density: 239.13/km^{2} (619.35/sq mi)
- Time zone: UTC+01:00 (CET)
  - Summer (DST): UTC+02:00 (CEST)
- Postal codes: 45721
- Dialling codes: 02364 (Haltern am See), 02360 (Lippramsdorf)
- Vehicle registration: RE
- Website: www.haltern-am-see.de

Haltern am See (German pronunciation: [ˈhaltɐn ʔam ˈzeː], lit. 'Haltern on the lake'; before December 2001 only Haltern) is a medium-sized town in the northern part of the district of Recklinghausen in the Regierungsbezirk Münster in North Rhine-Westphalia. The town is located in the northern Ruhr area, directly bordering the Münsterland region. In terms of natural geography, it belongs to the Westmünsterland. The town is about 80 kilometres (50 mi) north of Düsseldorf.

Haltern is surrounded by the Naturpark Hohe Mark and forest areas and is sparsely industrialized. The Haltern Reservoir and the Haard, Borkenberge, and Hohe Mark forest areas are popular local recreation areas.

== Geography and nature ==
Haltern am See is situated on the shores of the Halterner Stausee, which is a popular destination for swimming, boating, and hiking.

The area around the lake is characterized by green forests, rolling hills, and sprawling meadows. The town is surrounded by several nature reserves, including the Hohe Mark Nature Park, which is known for its flora and fauna. Here, visitors can hike through dense forests and spot rare birds and other wildlife.

During winter, tourists can experience traditional German Christmas markets. These markets are held in the city's historic old town.

In the summer months, Haltern am See offers visitors the opportunity to explore the rural areas of Germany. The city is surrounded by fields and rolling countryside.

=== City structure ===
The city is divided into the districts, with the associated hamlets:

- Haltern-Mitte (19,771 inhabitants); with Berghaltern (formerly the Holtwick farmstead), which has grown close to the core city, in the extreme southwest.
- Sythen (6,305 inhabitants); with Lehmbraken, Uphusen, and Stockwiese; the Sythener End in the extreme northeast has belonged to Hausdülmen since 1975.
- Lippramsdorf (3,569 inhabitants); with Freiheit in the east, Eppendorf in the northeast, and Tannenberg in the extreme north-northeast (former Eppendorf farming community), the younger settlements of Mersch in the south and Hagelkreuz (Schabbrink) in the northwest, as well as the scattered Kusenhorst farming community in the extreme southwest
- Hullern (2,379 inhabitants); with the settlements of Overrath, Westrup, and Antrup
- Hamm-Bossendorf (2,061 inhabitants); Bossendorf is now the larger of the two villages
- Flaesheim (1,905 inhabitants); with Westleven
- Lavesum (1,741 inhabitants); with Lochtrup, Ontrup, Strünkede, and Granat in the extreme west
- Holtwick (932 inhabitants); with Lünzum to the east, Hennewig to the far east, the younger settlement on Waldstraße towards the city center to the southeast, as well as Bergbossendorf and, to the east of it, Annaberg in the far south near the Lippe River.

The medieval structure of the old town is clearly recognizable, with only hidden remnants of the buildings from this period remaining (e.g., the town hall, Gänsemarkt). Nevertheless, the image of a typical Münsterland town emerges.

== History ==
=== Prehistory ===
About one hundred flint artifacts from the late Neanderthal period were found in a dry sand pit in Haltern-Lavesum between 2009 and 2012. Cores provided evidence of the typical use of Levallois technique, a technique used to obtain flakes and blades. The site is associated with wedge knife groups (cf. Micoquia).

Artifacts from the Neolithic also come from Lavesum. These include two blades made of Rijckholt flint, i.e., from the Netherlands or the Rhine region, and a chalcedony scraper from a deposit near Bonn-Muffendorf. Not only were they transported over 100 km, but they also represent some of the earliest artifacts from the period of repopulation of the Westphalian Bay after the last Last Glacial Period.

254 flint artifacts from Bergbossendorf can be dated to the Late Glacial Interstadial. This constitutes a complete inventory that likely originates from a short stay by a hunting party.

In Haltern-Uphusen, small remains of a solitary farmstead with a granary (probably without livestock) from the Early Iron Age were excavated starting in 2015.

=== Roman rule ===
Along the Lippe River, the Romans repeatedly moved from the west into the Westphalian hinterland and established military camps. The plan to make Germania a Roman province failed in 9 AD with the Battle of the Teutoburg Forest and finally in 16 AD with Tiberius's renunciation of the Germania east of the Rhine after the failed campaigns of Germanicus. All Lippe camps, including the one in Haltern, were abandoned. In the present-day urban area of Haltern, there were several partially fortified camps and forts, as well as a harbor on the Lippe River. The former Roman Aliso camp is believed to have been located in the Haltern Roman camp. Many finds from this period are on display in the LWL-Römermuseum in Haltern.

=== Middle Ages ===
On February 3, 1289, what was then Halteren received lower city rights (minor city) from its sovereign, the Prince-Bishop of Münster Everhard von Diest, “quale in aliis opides nostris Coesvelt et Borken” (Latin: as in our other cities Coesfeld and Borken), and thus the right to build a city wall, of which the Seven Devils Tower (Siebenteufelsturm) is still preserved.

Like many other towns in Westphalia, Haltern was a member of the Hanseatic League from the 14th century until 1611. The activities of Haltern citizens in the Hanseatic League's trading alliance can be traced back even further. Today, Haltern is a member of the International Hanseatic League of the Modern Age and the Westphalian Hanseatic League, which sought to revive the Hanseatic League with their re-foundation in the 1980s.

=== 20th century ===
During Kristallnacht (1938), the town's synagogue, Jewish cemetery and the houses and shops belonging to the town's Jews were vandalised. Jews were deported to concentration camps, the last five of whom were deported in January 1942. Only one of the town's Jews survived the Holocaust: Alexander Lebenstein, after whom a school is named.

=== 21st century ===
In March 2015, the town received international attention when 16 students and two teachers from the Joseph-König-Gymnasium in Haltern, were killed in the Germanwings Flight 9525 crash in the French Alps. They were on their way home from a student exchange with the Giola Institute in Llinars del Vallès, Catalonia, Spain. Haltern's then mayor, Bodo Klimpel, described it as "the darkest day in the history of our city."

== Population ==
Historical population

Year	Pop.	±% p.a.
1965	25,568	—
1970	27,067	+1.15%
1975	29,736	+1.90%
1980	30,952	+0.80%
1985	31,841	+0.57%
1990	34,025	+1.34%
1995	35,587	+0.90%

Year	Pop.	±% p.a.
2000	36,776	+0.66%
2005	37,922	+0.62%
2010	37,763	−0.08%
2015	38,020	+0.14%
2020	37,845	−0.09%
2025	38,029	+0.10%

Source: Landesdatabank Nordrhein-Westfalen

== Gallery ==
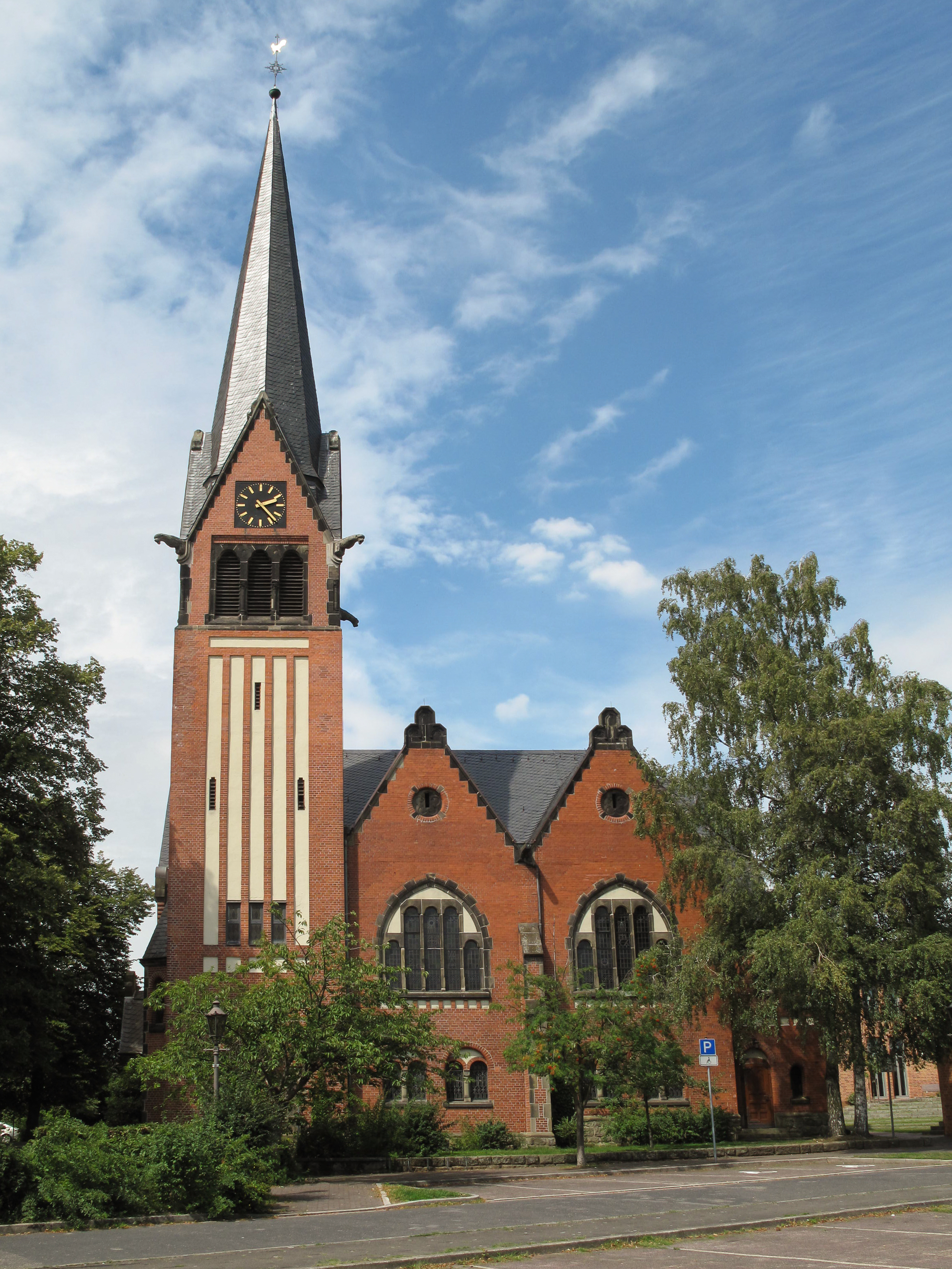
Erlöserkirche

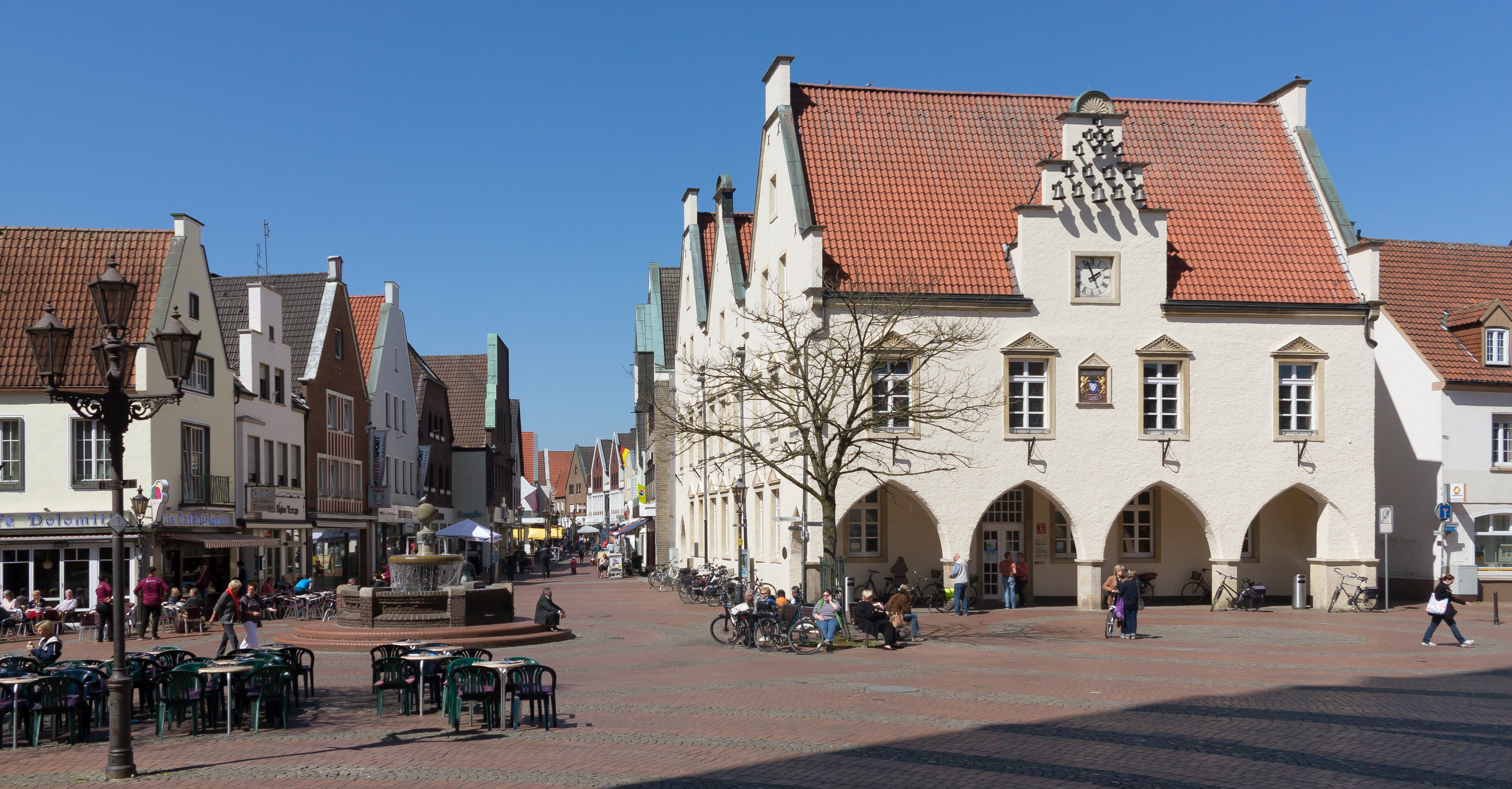
Former town hall

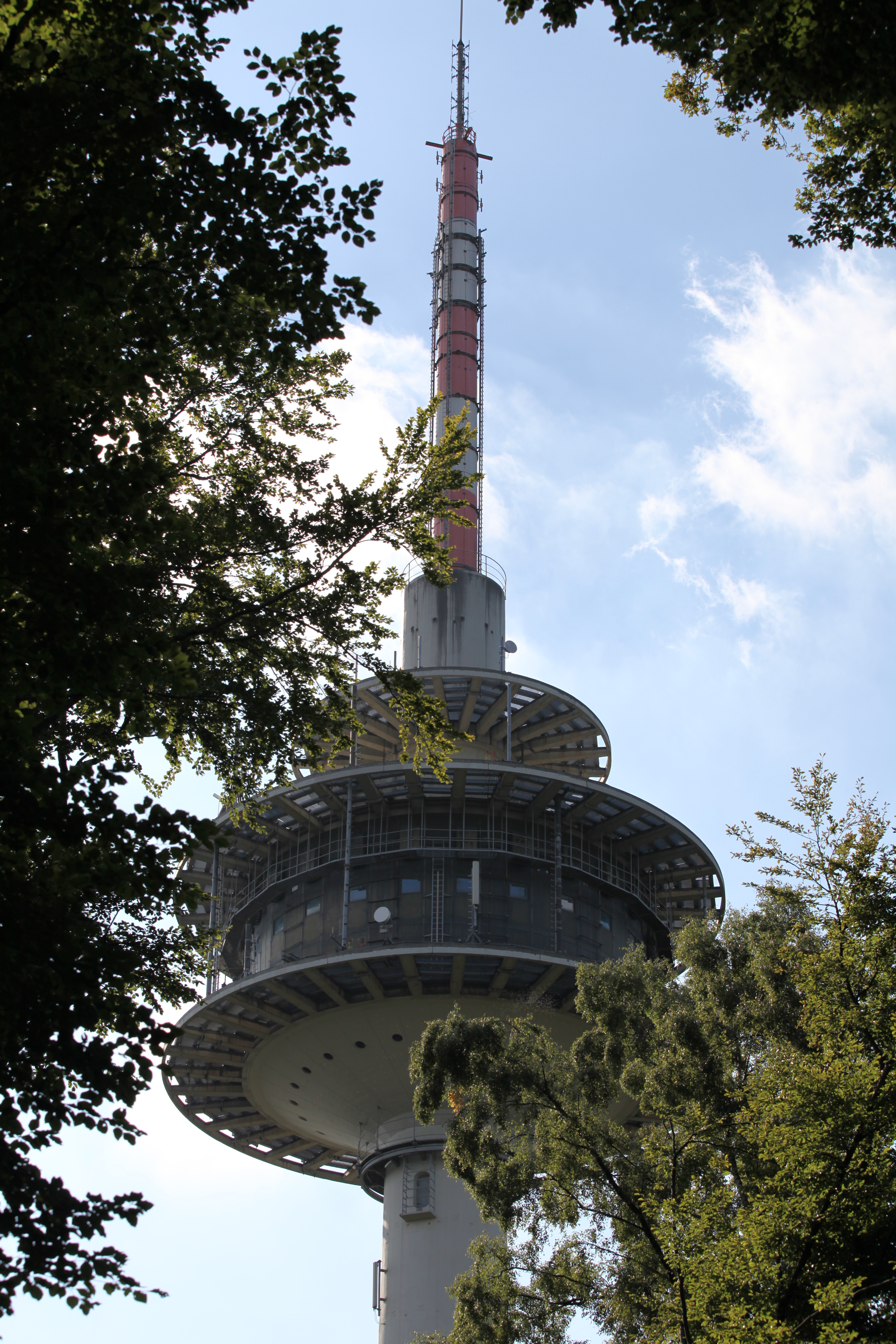
Telecommunications tower Haltern

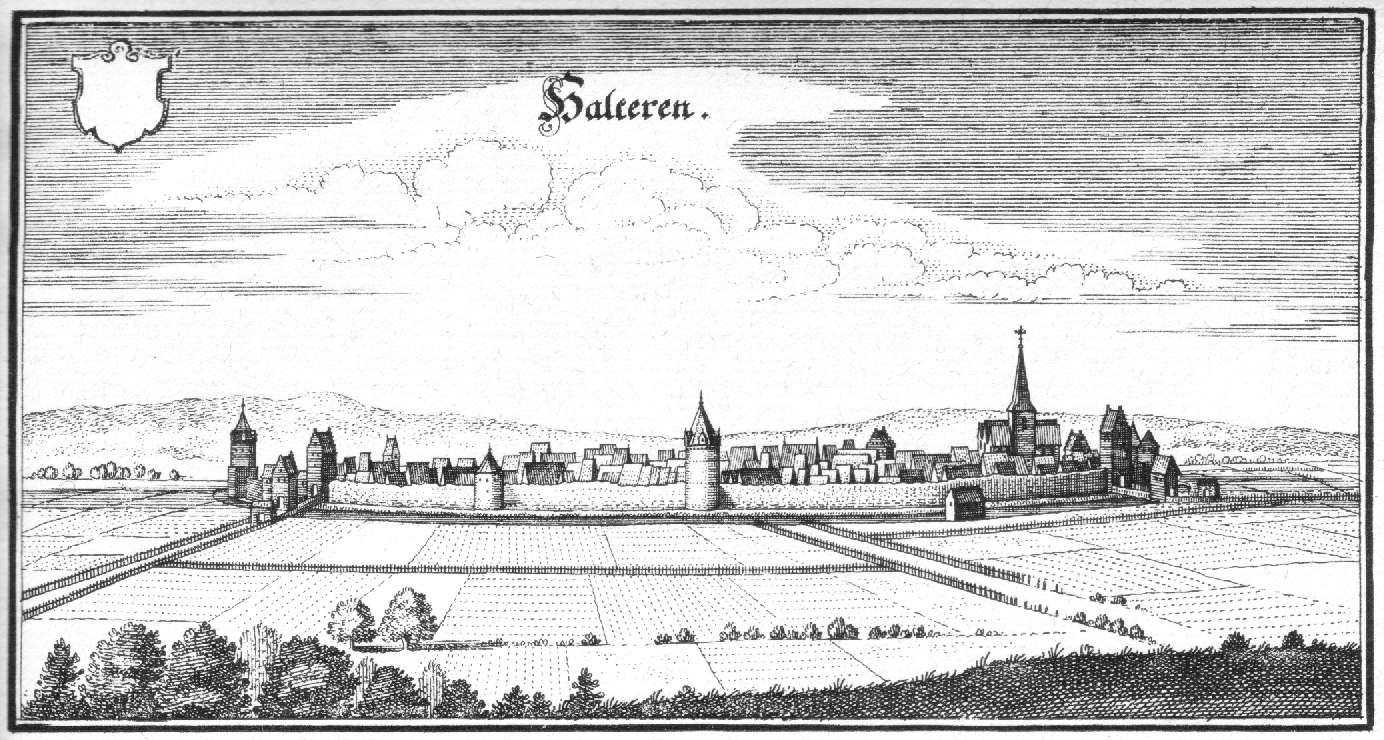
Haltern around 1647 (copperplate engraving by Matthäus Merian)

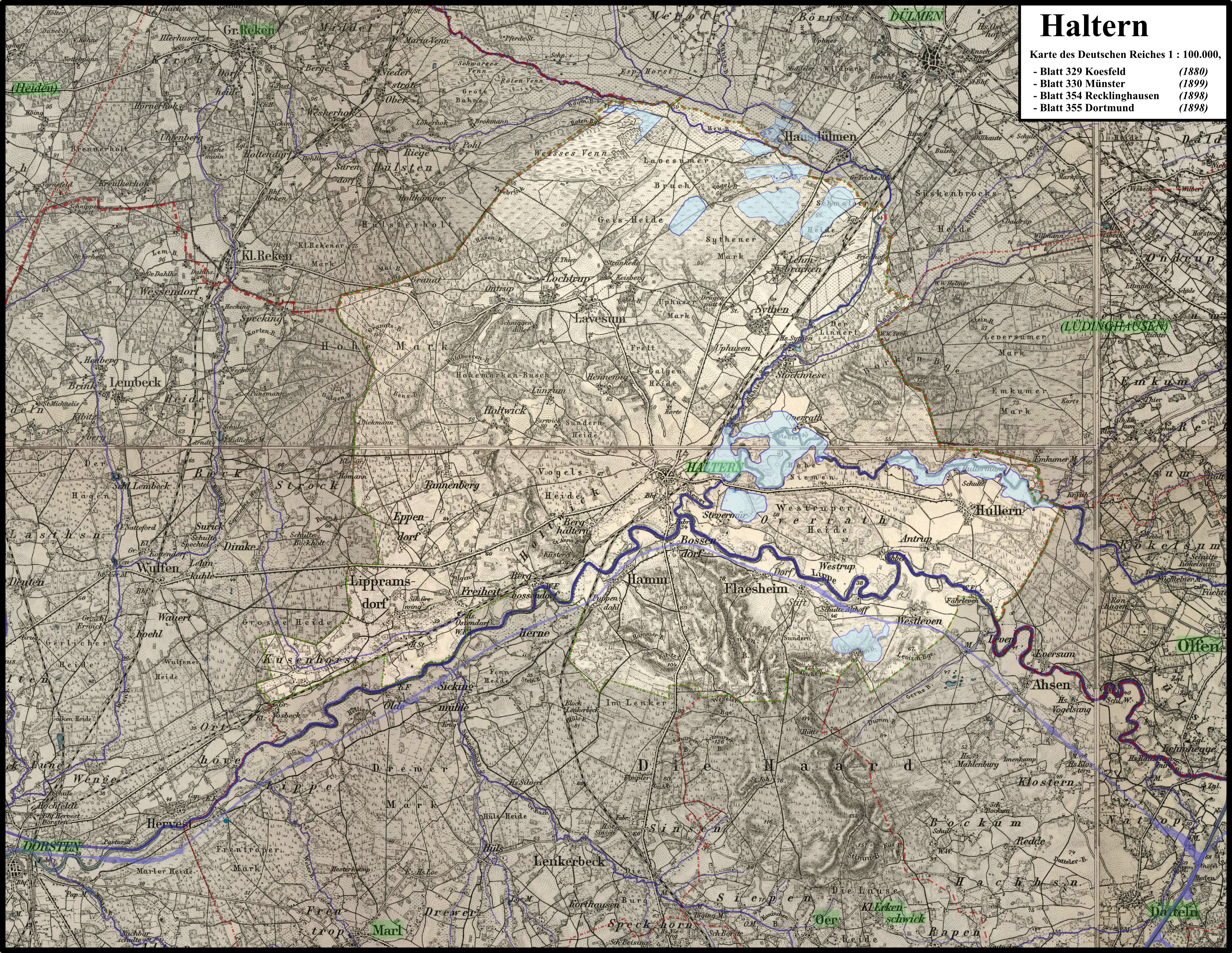
Map of the German Empire 1:100,000 of today's Haltern area at the end of the 19th century

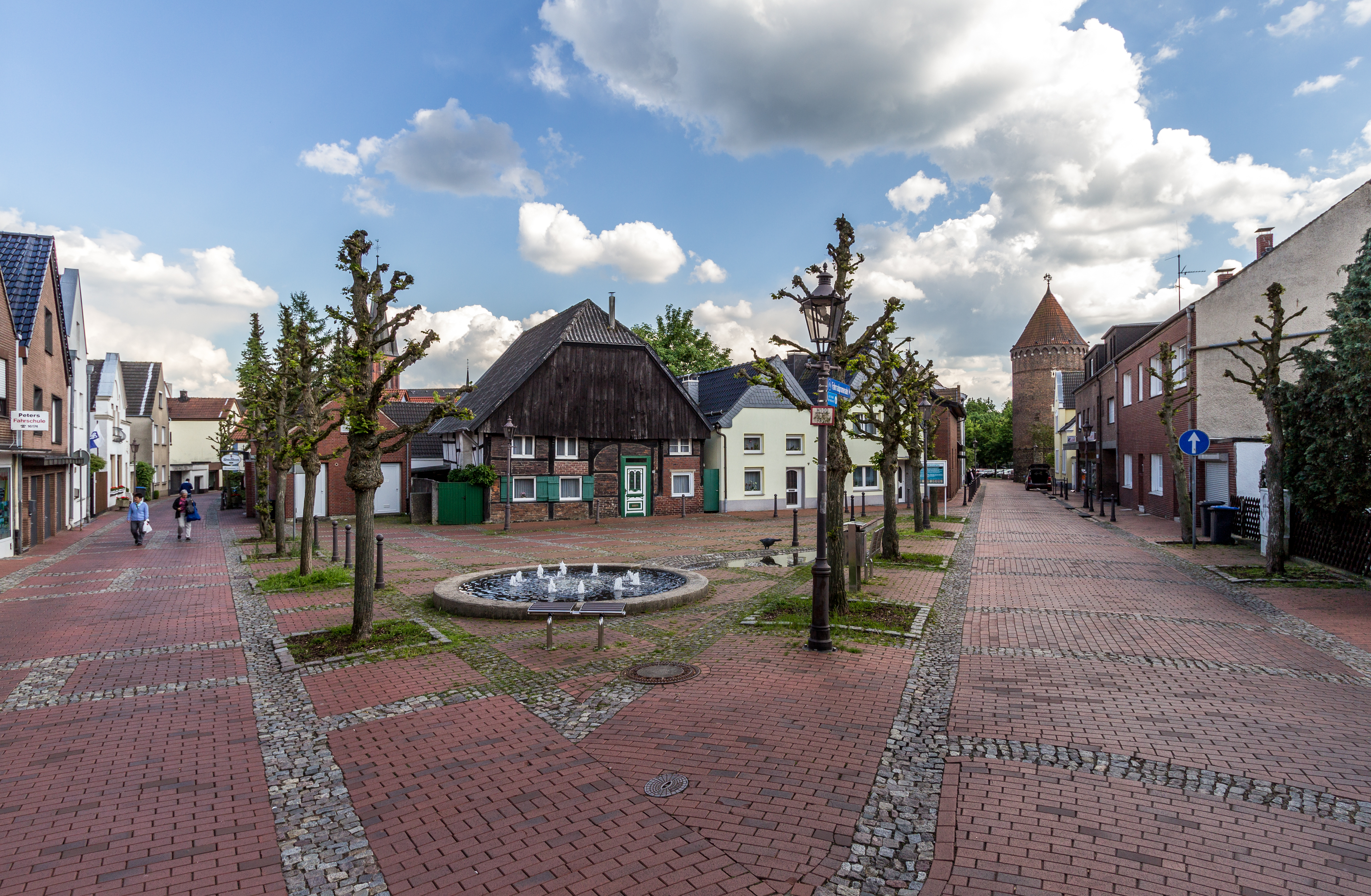
Goose market (Gänsemarkt)

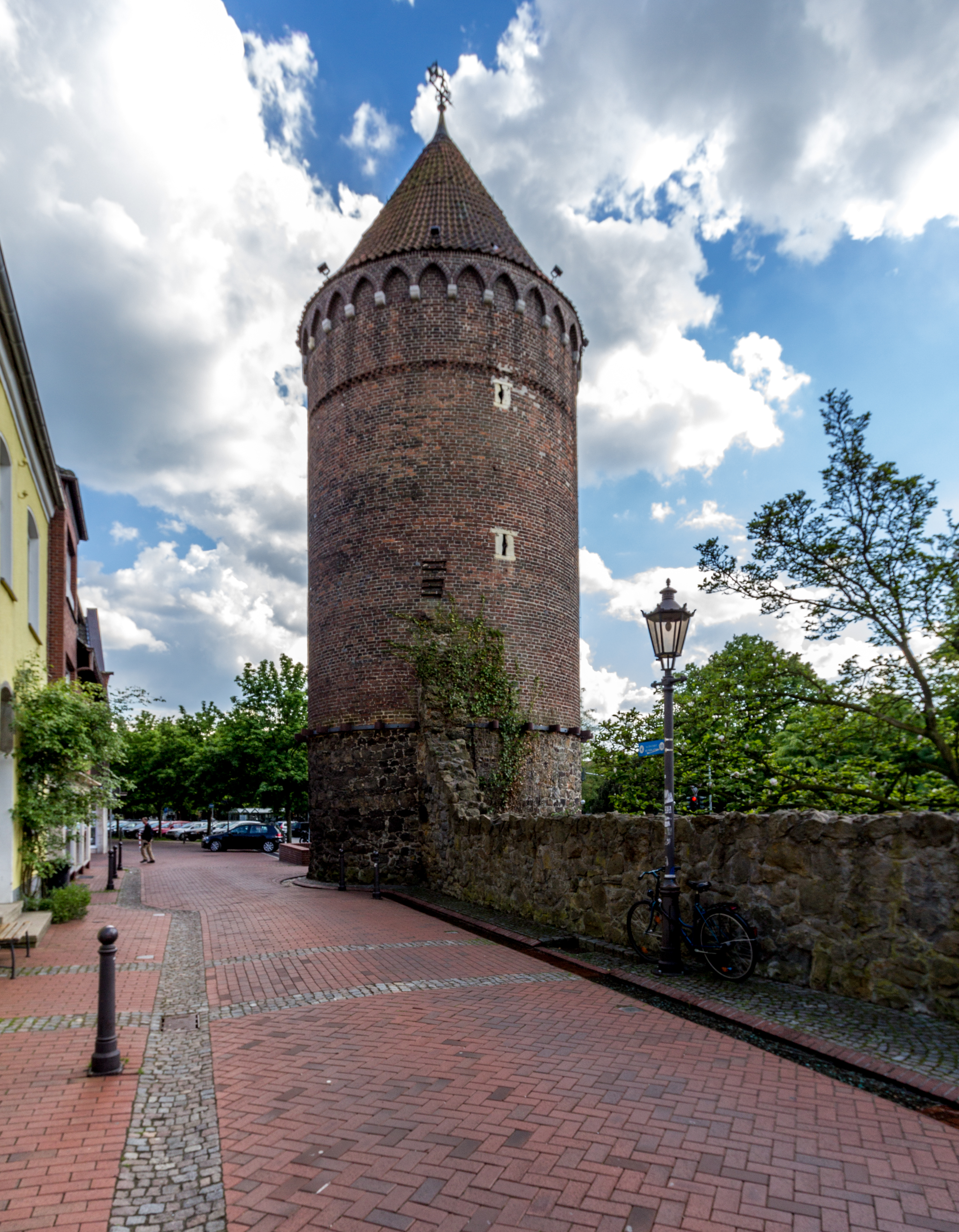
Siebenteufelsturm

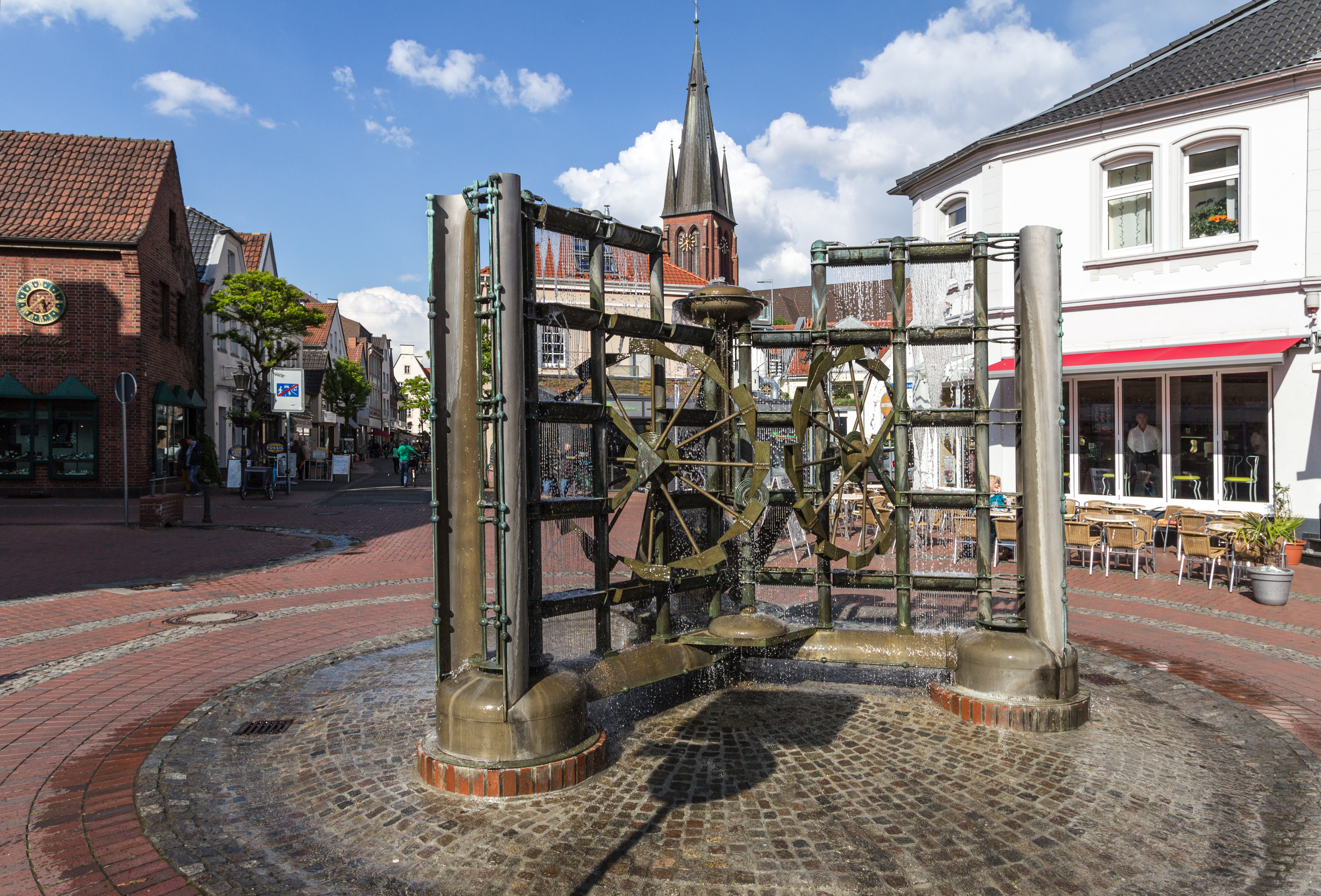
Fountain sculpture at the Merschtor

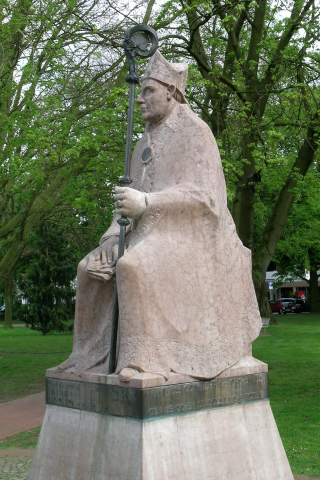
Kardinal Graf von Galen statue in the Kardinal-Graf-von-Galen-Park

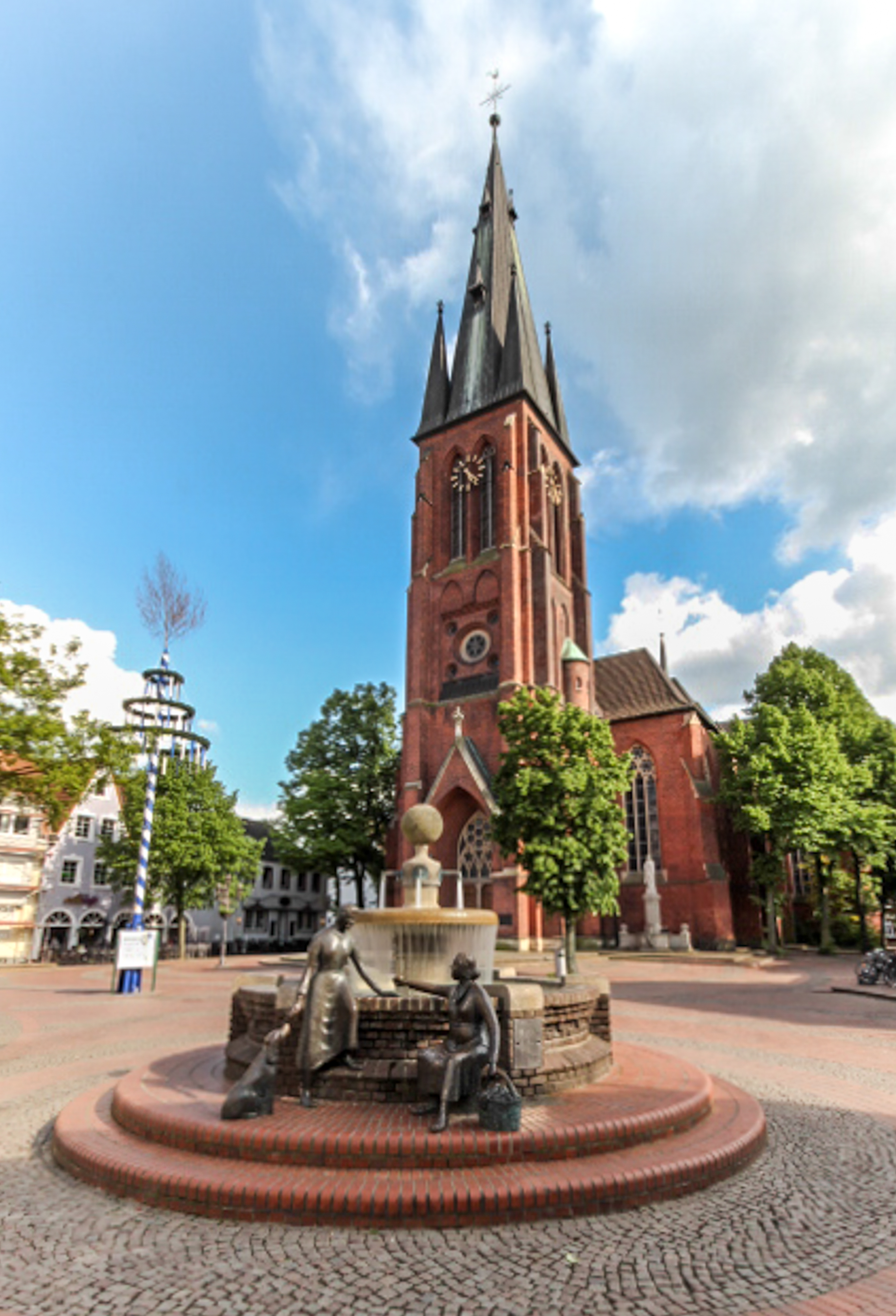
Church St. Sixtus

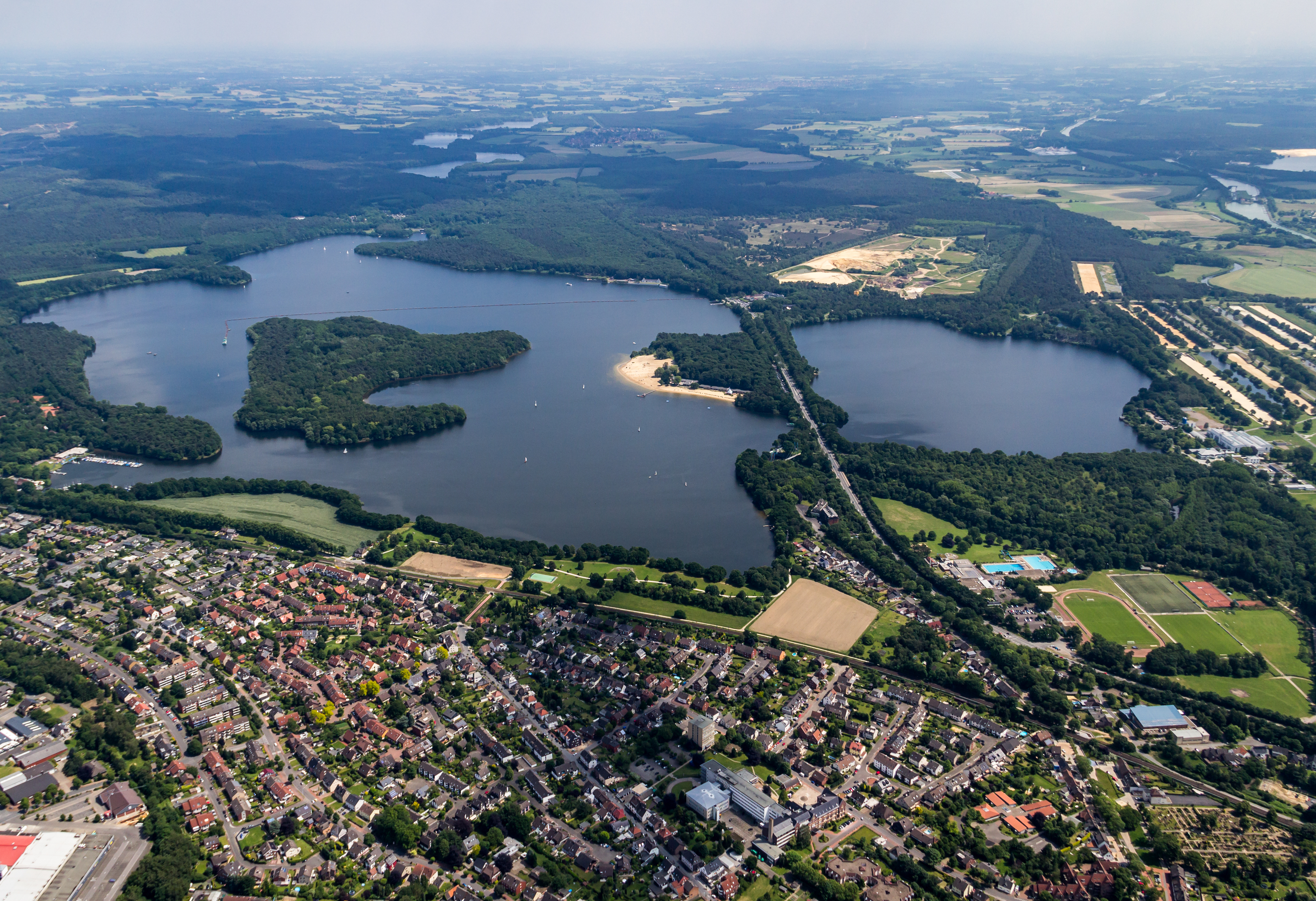
Haltern Reservoir

== Notable people ==
- Benedikt Höwedes, former footballer for Juventus FC and Germany, was born in the city
- Joseph König (1843–1930), chemist, after whom the Joseph-König-Gymnasium is named, was born in Lavesum in Haltern
- Alexander Lebenstein, Holocaust survivor, after whom the Alexander-Lebenstein-Realschule is named, was born in Haltern
- Christoph Metzelder, former footballer for Borussia Dortmund and Schalke 04, was born in the city
- Bodo Klimpel, mayor of Haltern am See between 2004 and 2020, was born in Rourkela, State of Odisha, India
- Luba Goy, German-Canadian actress and comedian, was born in Haltern in 1945 and emigrated to Canada with her parents in 1951
- Theodor Buddenbrock (1878 - 1959), Catholic Archbishop and missionary to China, holder of the Grand Cross of Merit of the Federal Republic of Germany
- Winfried König (1932 - 2015), Roman Catholic priest and Apostolic Visitor of the former German Archdiocese of Breslau

== Twin towns – sister cities ==
Haltern am See is twinned with:

- Roost-Warendin, France
- Sankt Veit an der Glan, Austria
