= Bodo Klimpel =

German politician

Mayor of Haltern am See
- In office September 2004 – September 2020

Personal details
- Born: 12 November 1963 (age 62) Rourkela, Odisha, India
- Party: Christian Democratic Union

Bodo Klimpel (born 12 November 1963) is a German politician (CDU). He was the mayor of the North Rhine-Westphalian town Haltern am See and is now the Landrat (district chief) of the District Recklinghausen.

== Life ==
Klimpel was born in Rourkela, in the Indian state of Odisha, where his father was working on the construction of a German steelworks.

He trained as a management professional in the town of Kaarst. After his studies, he worked in the city of Düsseldorf's Finance Department. In 2001 he became the Treasurer of the Town of Haltern. Since September 2004, he has been mayor of the town, having been elected with 50.7 percent of the valid votes. In 2009, he was re-elected with 74.2 percent of valid votes, increasing his share of votes by more than 30 percent compared to the 2004 election. In the mayoral election in 2014, he received 52.5 percent of the valid votes.

Klimpel married in 1994 and has a son and a daughter.

== Germanwings Flight 9525 ==
Reacting to Germanwings Flight 9525 plane crash as mayor of Haltern am See, he said "This is the darkest day in the history of our city," and "A feeling of shock can be felt everywhere. It is about the worst thing imaginable." 16 school children and two teachers from Haltern were on board an ill-fated Germanwings airplane.
