= Christoph Metzelder =

German footballer (born 1980)

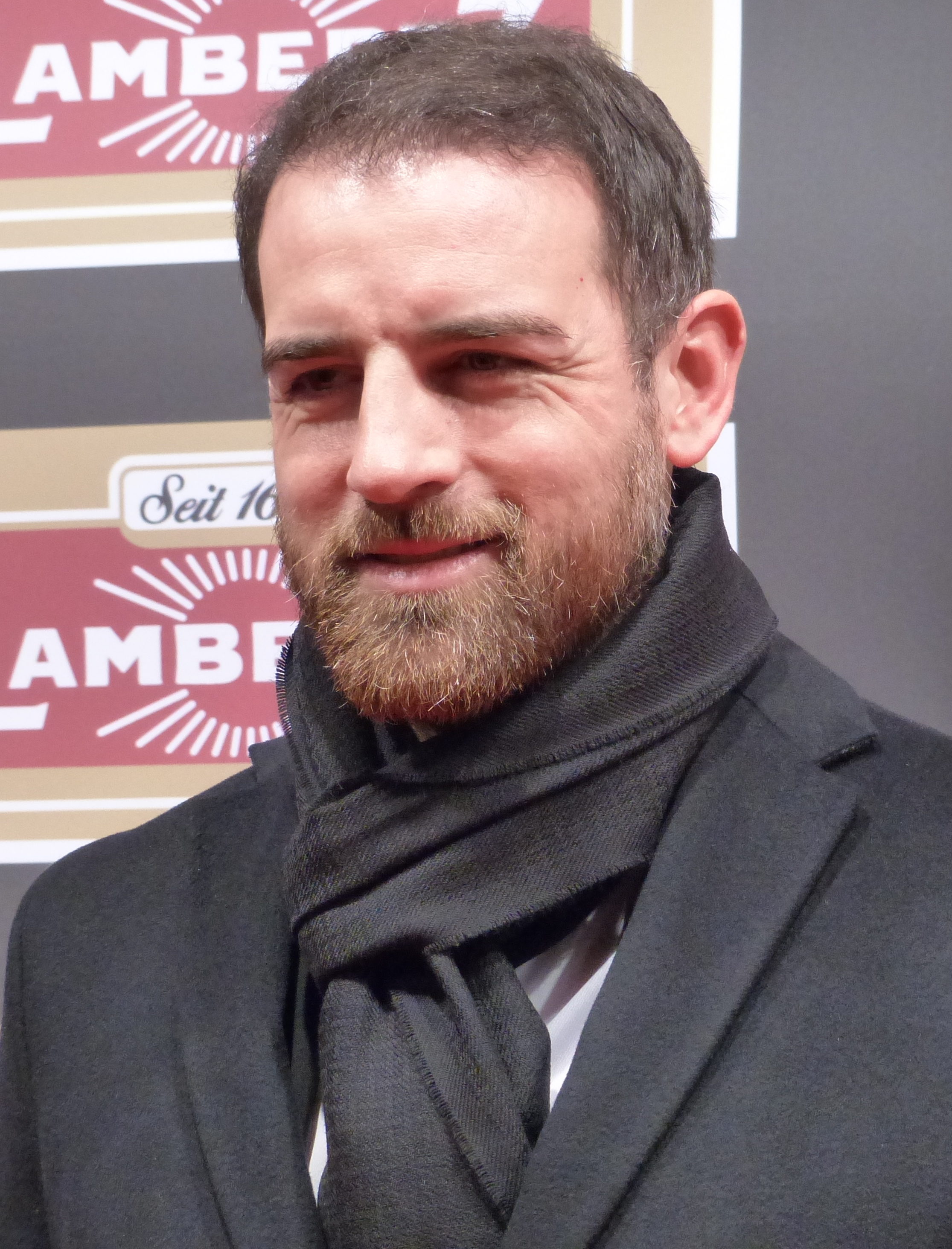
- Metzelder in 2016

Personal information
- Full name: Christoph Tobias Metzelder
- Date of birth: 5 November 1980 (age 46)
- Place of birth: Haltern, West Germany
- Height: 1.94 m (6 ft 4 in)
- Position: Centre-back

Youth career
- 1986–1995: TuS Haltern
- 1995–1996: Schalke 04
- 1996–1998: Preußen Münster

Senior career*
Years	Team	Apps	(Gls)
1999–2000	Preußen Münster	32	(4)
2000–2007	Borussia Dortmund	126	(2)
2007–2010	Real Madrid	23	(0)
2010–2013	Schalke 04	52	(2)
2013–2014	TuS Haltern	1	(0)
Total		234	(8)

International career
2000–2001	Germany U21	9	(1)
2001–2008	Germany	47	(0)
Medal record
Men's Football
Representing Germany
FIFA World Cup
Runner-up	2002 South Korea–Japan
Third place	2006 Germany
UEFA European Championship
Runner-up	2008 Austria–Switzerland
- * Club domestic league appearances and goals

Christoph Tobias Metzelder (born 5 November 1980) is a German former professional footballer who played as a centre-back.

Most of his professional career, which was spent mostly at Borussia Dortmund, was blighted by injuries. He did manage, however, to appear 47 times for the Germany national team, representing the country at two World Cups and Euro 2008.

Metzelder also played three seasons apiece for Real Madrid and Schalke 04, amassing Bundesliga totals of 178 matches and four goals over one full decade.

== Career ==
=== Borussia Dortmund ===
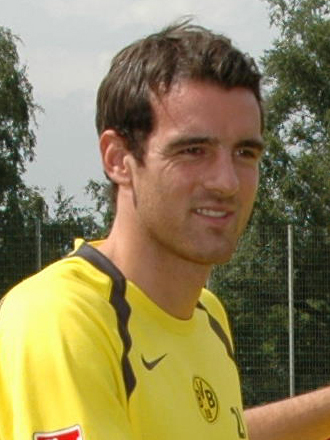
Metzelder with Dortmund

Metzelder was born in Haltern, North Rhine-Westphalia. In the summer of 2000 he signed with Borussia Dortmund from SC Preußen Münster, and he was an instant success. At the end of his first season in the Bundesliga he won his first cap for Germany, playing the second half of a 5–2 friendly win in Hungary on 15 August 2001.

The second campaign at Dortmund brought Metzelder the 2002 national title and 14 matches with Germany, all the way to the 2002 FIFA World Cup final with the latter. However, he missed the entire 2003–04 due to an Achilles tendon injury, and only took part in 16 league games in the following season.

After over two years out of the national squad, Metzelder was called by new boss Jürgen Klinsmann for a friendly with China, in October 2005. He also scored his first two league goals, in 1–1 draws against Mainz 05 and Hamburger SV, and would be Germany's undisputed starter at the 2006 World Cup, partnering with SV Werder Bremen's Per Mertesacker.

=== Real Madrid ===
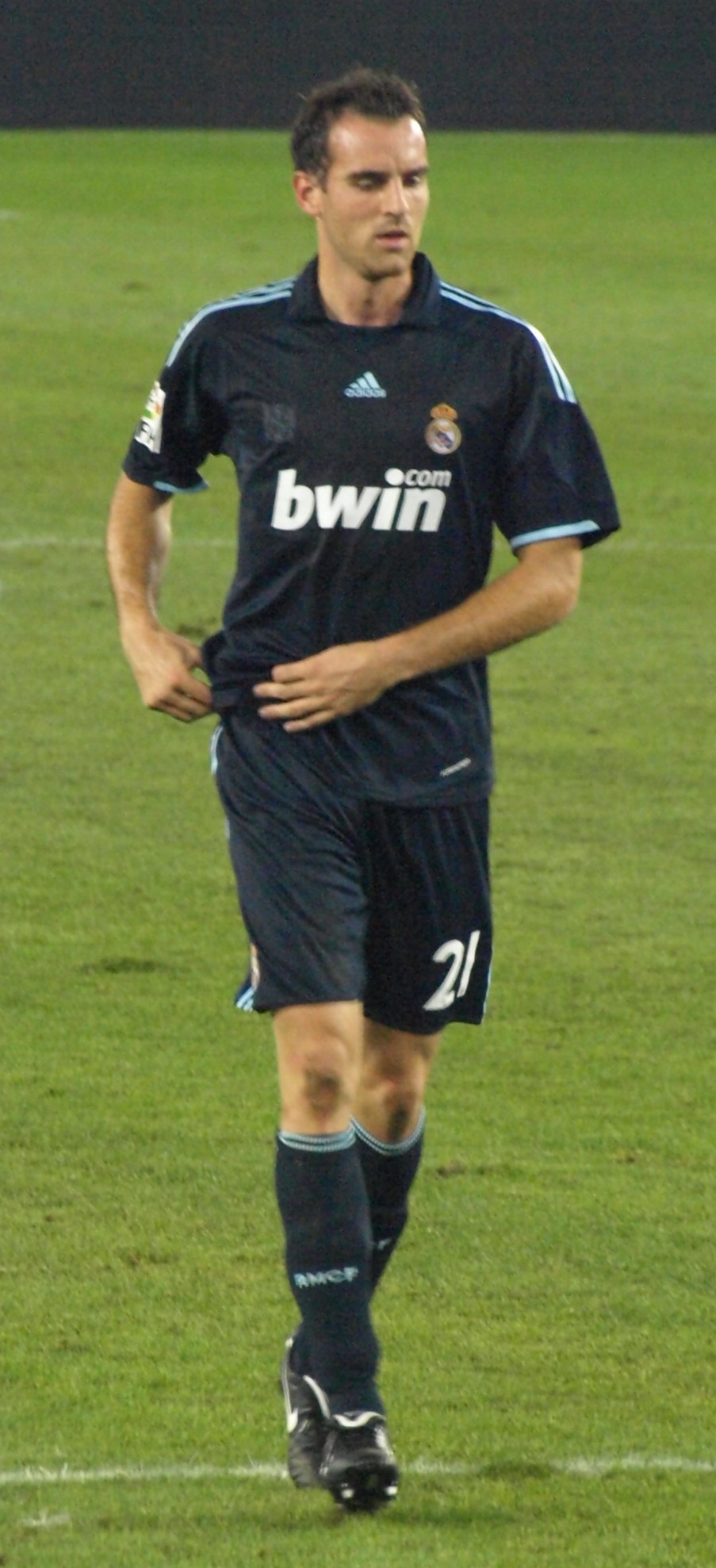
Metzelder playing for Real Madrid in 2009

On 18 April 2007, after failing to renew his contract at Borussia, Metzelder transferred to Real Madrid at the end of the season on a free transfer. In February 2008, after managing to be injury-free in the first months of his Spanish adventure, he had surgery on the sole of his foot, resulting in him missing nearly 60 days of action; on 11 May, after having already missed the UEFA Champions League round-of-16 clash against A.S. Roma, he returned and played the full 90 minutes against Real Zaragoza (2–2 away draw).

Despite his lack of playing time, Metzelder featured in all of Germany's matches at UEFA Euro 2008, again partnering Mertesacker. In 2008–09's La Liga, he was the main beneficiary of a ten-match suspension handed to Real's Pepe; after a stellar performance in a 4–2 win at Sevilla FC he also started in the 6–2 home defeat at the hands of FC Barcelona, for a career-best – in Spain – 12 appearances.

Metzelder left Real Madrid after his contract expired on 30 June 2010.

=== Return to Germany ===
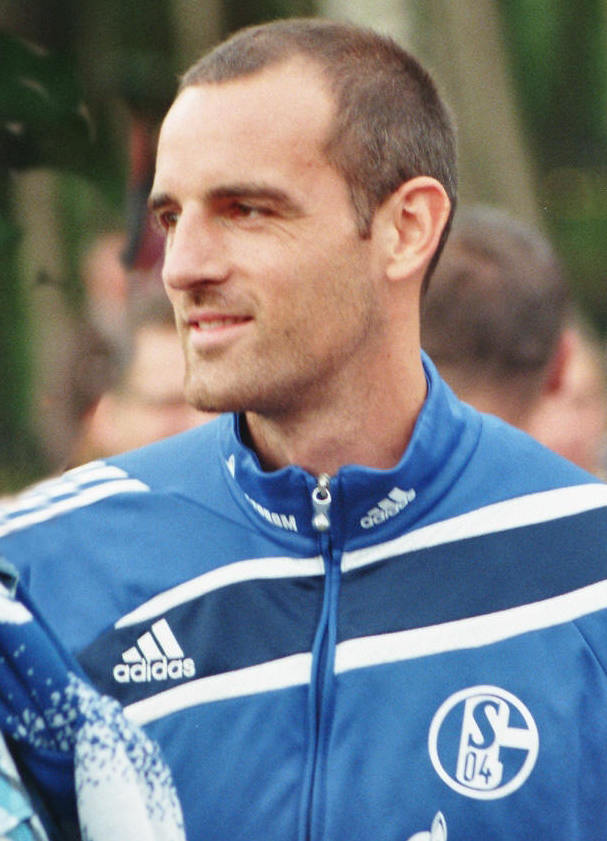
Metzelder with Schalke in 2010

On 27 April 2010, prior to the end of the campaign, Metzelder announced his return to Germany, agreeing on a three-year contract with FC Schalke 04, with which he had already played youth football 15 years earlier. His first two league games with the club, the first of 2010–11, ended with 2–1 losses, to Hamburger SV and Hannover 96.

Metzelder appeared in ten complete matches in the season's Champions League, in an eventual last-four run. He added five in the domestic cup victorious campaign, including the semi-finals against FC Bayern Munich (1–0 win) and the final against MSV Duisburg (5–0).

In May 2013, 32-year-old Metzelder announced his retirement from professional football at the end of the campaign. In July 2019, he was hired as a pundit by public broadcaster ARD. At the time of coming under criminal investigation in September 2019 he was a pundit for Sky Sports.

== Personal life ==
Metzelder's younger brother, Malte, was also a footballer (and a centre-back), and both played for Borussia Dortmund.

He has one daughter, Emma (born 17 October 2009), with girlfriend Julia Gödicke.

In 2006 he founded an organisation helping socially disadvantaged German youth and continues to run it.

=== Possession of child pornography ===
Metzelder was being investigated for the potential distribution of child pornography, which led him to step down from his role as president of his former club TuS Haltern am See in September 2019.

On 4 September 2020, the district court of the city of Düsseldorf announced that an official charge had been filed against Metzelder by the prosecutor. The prosecutor did not express any specific suspicions. The district court stated in a press release that one female witness received 10 child pornographic pictures, another female witness received 16 child pornographic pictures and two child pornographic videos and a third female witness received one child pornographic picture—all distributed by using Metzelder's WhatsApp account. The statement also mentioned nearly 300 media files with child pornographic content having been found on Metzelder's confiscated cell phone. Metzelder himself had the allegations denied by his lawyers. On 14 September, it was reported that the Düsseldorf court's decision "indirectly stated" that Metzelder had confessed. His trial was on 29 April 2021 and he was sentenced to a ten-month suspended prison sentence for owning and distributing child pornography. Giving evidence at trial, he admitted he had collected and disseminated child pornography, and that he engaged in "extreme fantasies in chats."

In April 2021, Metzelder's lawyer stated Metzelder was in therapy for "certain issues such as sexuality or dealing with women in certain situations".

== Career statistics ==
=== Club ===
Appearances and goals by club, season and competition
Club	Season	League			Cup		Europe		Other (Note: Includes DFL-Ligapokal, DFL-Supercup and UEFA Intertoto Cup)		Total	
Club	Season	Division	Apps	Goals	Apps	Goals	Apps	Goals	Apps	Goals	Apps	Goals
Borussia Dortmund	2000–01	Bundesliga	19	0	2	0	0	0	–		21	0
Borussia Dortmund	2001–02	Bundesliga	25	0	1	0	12	0	2	0	40	0
Borussia Dortmund	2002–03	Bundesliga	24	0	1	0	10	0	1	0	36	0
Borussia Dortmund	2003–04	Bundesliga	0	0	0	0	0	0	0	0	0	0
Borussia Dortmund	2004–05	Bundesliga	16	0	0	0	0	0	–		16	0
Borussia Dortmund	2005–06	Bundesliga	23	2	1	0	0	0	2	0	26	2
Borussia Dortmund	2006–07	Bundesliga	19	0	0	0	0	0	–		19	0
Borussia Dortmund	Total		126	2	5	0	22	0	5	0	158	2
Real Madrid	2007–08	La Liga	9	0	1	0	3	0	0	0	13	0
Real Madrid	2008–09	La Liga	12	0	2	0	1	0	0	0	15	0
Real Madrid	2009–10	La Liga	2	0	1	0	0	0	–		3	0
Real Madrid	Total		23	0	4	0	4	0	0	0	31	0
Schalke 04	2010–11	Bundesliga	32	1	5	0	10	0	1	0	48	1
Schalke 04	2011–12	Bundesliga	16	1	0	0	3	0	0	0	19	1
Schalke 04	2012–13	Bundesliga	4	0	2	0	1	0	–		7	0
Schalke 04	Total		52	2	7	0	14	0	1	0	74	2
Career total			201	4	16	0	40	0	6	0	263	4

=== International ===
Appearances and goals by national team and year
National team	Year	Apps	Goals
Germany	2001	1	0
Germany	2002	14	0
Germany	2003	1	0
Germany	2004	0	0
Germany	2005	1	0
Germany	2006	11	0
Germany	2007	11	0
Germany	2008	8	0
Total		47	0

== Honours ==
Borussia Dortmund

- Bundesliga: 2001–02
- DFB-Ligapokal runner-up: 2003
- UEFA Cup runner-up: 2001–02

Real Madrid

- La Liga: 2007–08
- Supercopa de España: 2008

Schalke 04

- DFB-Pokal: 2010–11
- DFL-Supercup: 2011; runner-up: 2010

Germany

- FIFA World Cup runner-up: 2002; third place: 2006
- UEFA European Championship runner-up: 2008

Individual

- Bravo Award: 2002
