= Llinars del Vallès =

- Municipality
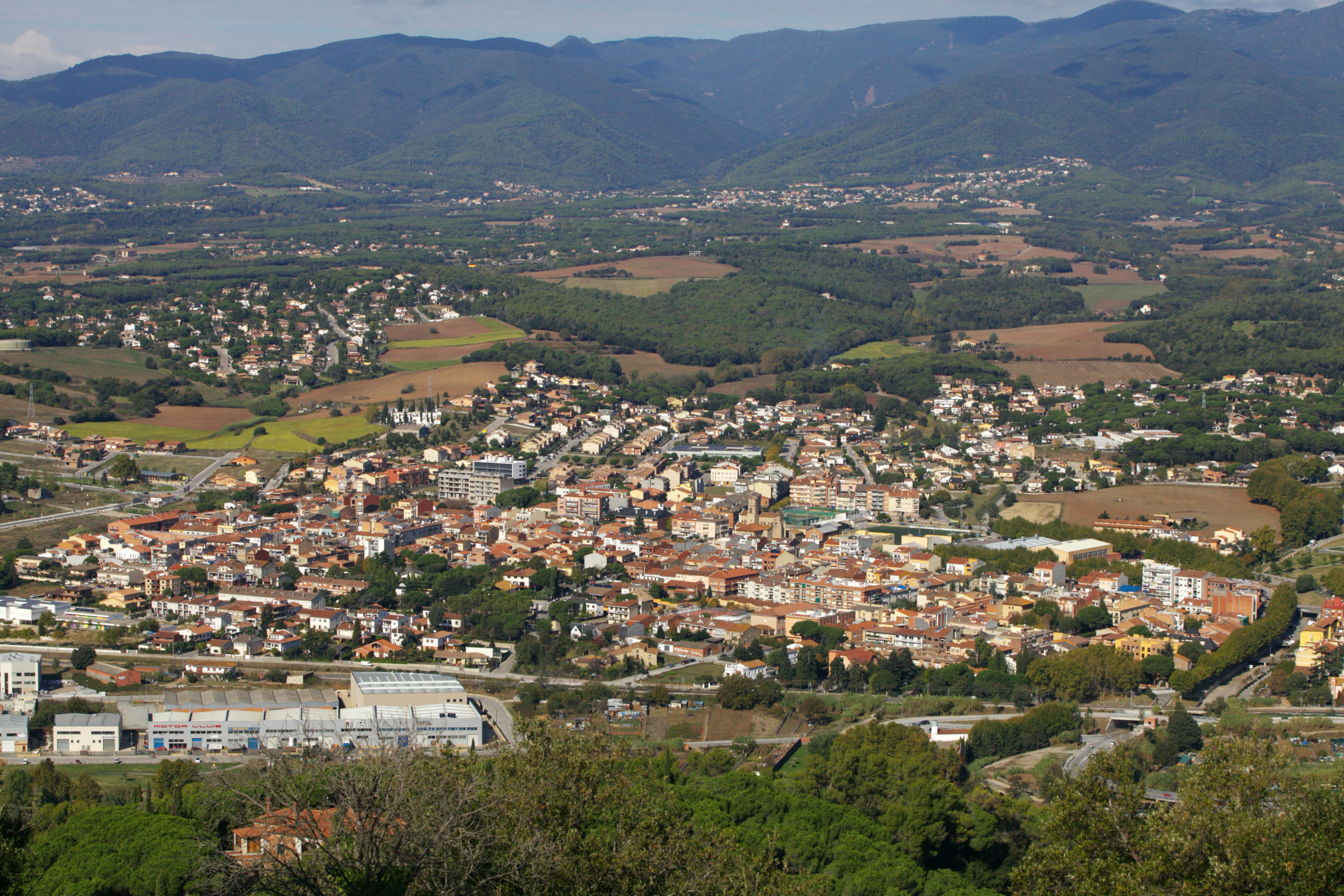
- View of the village

- Flag Coat of arms

- Location in Catalonia Llinars del Vallès (Spain)
- Coordinates: 41°38′26″N 2°24′8″E
- Country: Spain
- Community: Catalonia
- Province: Barcelona
- Comarca: Vallès Oriental

Government
  - Mayor: Martí Pujol Casals (2015)

Area
  - Total: 27.6 km^{2} (10.7 sq mi)
- Elevation: 198 m (650 ft)

Population (2025-01-01)
  - Total: 10,956
  - Density: 397/km^{2} (1,030/sq mi)
- Website: www.llinarsdelvalles.cat

Llinars del Vallès (Catalan pronunciation: [ʎiˈnaz ðəl βəˈʎɛs]) is a village and a municipality in the comarca of Vallès Oriental, in the province of Barcelona and autonomous community of Catalonia, Spain. That village forms part of the county of Baix Montseny. Its municipal term goes by the mountain of the Massís del Montseny to the Serralada Litoral. The dry agriculture is more abundant than the wet, that only predomines in the Mogent river. The forests are mediterranean (pines and holm oaks), though in the Serralada Litoral there are also oaks and cork oaks.

It is about 25 miles (40 km) northeast of Barcelona.

== Notable people ==
- Clara Serrajordi (born 2007), footballer for Barcelona
