= 185 =

185 may refer to:

- 185 (number), a number

== Time and events ==
- AD 185
- 185 BC, a year Before the Common Era
- Flight 185 (disambiguation), several aviation crashes
- SN 185 (supernova 185), a supernova observed by the Han Dynasty in 185 A.D.; the first known recorded supernova observation

== People ==
- Guantanamo captive 185 Turki Mash Awi Zayid Al Asiri (1975–2014), Saudi Arabian citizen

== Places ==
- 185 Eunike, a main-belt asteroid, the 185th asteroid registered
- Rural Municipality of McLeod No. 185, Saskatchewan, Canada
- Pennsylvania House of Representatives, District 185, southeast Pennsylvania, USA

=== Facilities, structures, infrastructure ===
- Highway 185; see List of highways numbered 185
- Block 185, Austin, Texas, USA
- Tower 185, Frankfurt, Germany
- S.M. Kirov Factory No. 185, a Soviet automotive machine factory for tanks

== Military units ==
- No. 185 Squadron RAF, a WWI and WWII British Royal Air Force squadron
- No. 185 Gliding School RAF, a WWII British Royal Air Force training squadron
- 185 Heavy Battery, Royal Artillery, an interwar British artillery battery
- 185th Infantry Division "Folgore", an Italian WWII parachute division
- 185th Air Refueling Wing, Iowa Air National Guard, USA
- VA-185 (U.S. Navy), the Nighthawks, a U.S. Navy air squadron

=== Ships with pennant number 185 ===
- Japanese submarine I-185, a WWII Imperial Japanese Navy cruiser submarine
- German submarine U-185, a WWII German Kriegsmarine subarmine
- USS Bagley (DD-185), a WWI U.S. Navy Wickes-class destroyer
- USS Clarinda (YP-185), a WWI U.S. Navy armed yacht
- USS Snapper (SS-185), an interwar U.S. Navy Salmon-class submarine
- USS Koka (ATA-185), a WWII U.S. Navy tugboat
- USS Gwinnett (AK-185), a WWII U.S. Navy cargoship
- USS Riddle (DE-185), a WWII U.S. Navy Cannon-class destroyer escort
- USS Hannam (PG-185), a WWII U.S. Navy Tacoma-class patrol gunboat
- USS Carthage (AG-185), a WWII U.S. Victory Ship
- PNS Tippu Sultan (D-185), a Pakistani Navy Tariq-class desteroyer
- Vietnamese submarine Khánh Hoà (HQ-185), a 21st-century Vietnamese Kilo-class submarine

== Other vehicles ==
- Class 185 (disambiguation), several vehicle classes

=== Aircraft ===
- Cessna 185 Skywagon, a single-engine six-seater general-aviation airplane
- Johnson Rocket 185, a two-seater general-aviation monoplane
- Rearwin Skyranger 185, a two-seater general-aviation airplane
- Supermarine Type 185, a British biplane

=== Trains ===
- 185 series, a Japanese electric-multiple-unit train type
- KiHa 185 series, a Japanese diesel-multiple-unit train type

== Other products ==
- Mossberg 185, a 20-gauge bolt-action shotgun
- Rotax 185, a 2-stroke industrial engine
- Warner Super Scarab 185, a radial aeroengine

== Isotope 185 ==
- Bismuth-185
- Gold-185
- Hafnium-185
- Iridium-185
- Lead-185
- Mercury-185
- Osmium-185
- Platinum-185
- Rhenium-185
- Tantalum-185
- Thallium-185
- Tungsten-185

== Other uses ==
- Radical 185, a Han written character
- London Buses route 185, London, England, UK
- 185, a 2017 song by Baiyon featuring C418 from We Are

== See also ==
- 185th (disambiguation)
- 1.85:1, a common cinematographic screen ratio
- §185 (EP), a 2017 record by Kollegah and Farid Bang
