= HM LST-13 =

1943 LST-1-class tank landing ship

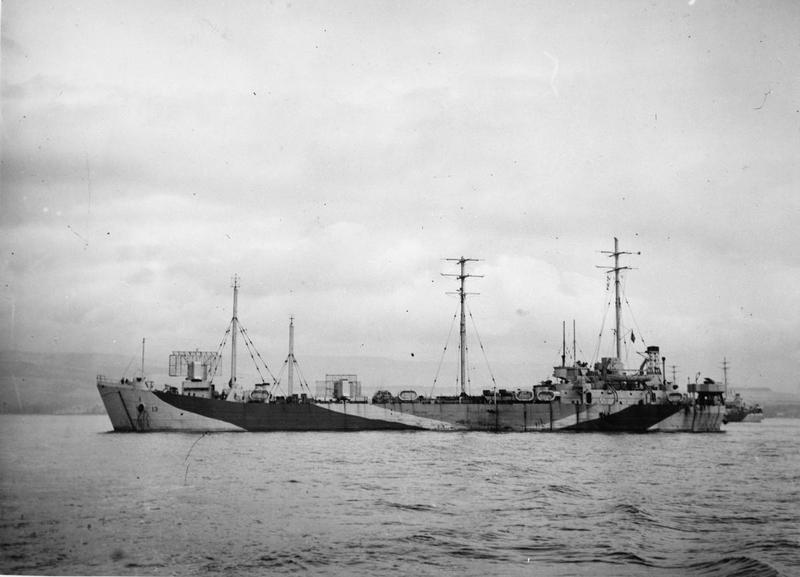
- HM FDT-13, ex-LST-13, 23 March 1944, Greenock, Scotland.

History

United States
- Name: LST-13
- Builder: Dravo Corporation, Pittsburgh, Pennsylvania
- Laid down: 1 September 1942
- Launched: 5 January 1943
- Sponsored by: Mrs. Jean A. Brackmann
- Fate: Transferred to the Royal Navy, 3 April 1943

United Kingdom
- Name: LST-13 (1943–1944); FDT-13 (1944–1946)
- Acquired: 3 April 1943
- Commissioned: 3 April 1943
- Out of service: 27 February 1946
- Reclassified: Fighter Direction Tender, January 1944
- Fate: Returned to US Naval custody, 27 February 1946

United States
- Acquired: 27 February 1946
- Stricken: 5 June 1946
- Fate: Sold for scrapping, 11 October 1947

General characteristics
- Type: LST-1-class tank landing ship
- Displacement: 4,080 long tons (4,145 t) full load; 2,160 long tons (2,190 t) landing
- Length: 328 ft (100 m) oa
- Beam: 50 ft (15 m)
- Draft: Full load: 8 ft 2 in (2.49 m) forward; 14 ft 1 in (4.29 m) aft; Landing at 2,160 t: 3 ft 11 in (1.19 m) forward; 9 ft 10 in (3.00 m) aft
- Installed power: 2 × 900 hp (670 kW) Electro-Motive Diesel 12-567A diesel engines; 1,700 shp (1,300 kW)
- Propulsion: 1 × Falk main reduction gears; 2 × Propellers
- Speed: 12 kn (22 km/h; 14 mph)
- Range: 24,000 nmi (44,000 km; 28,000 mi) at 9 kn (17 km/h; 10 mph) while displacing 3,960 long tons (4,024 t)
- Boats & landing craft carried: 2 or 6 x LCVPs
- Capacity: 2,100 tons oceangoing maximum; 350 tons main deckload
- Troops: 163
- Complement: 117
- Armament: Varied, ultimate armament; 2 × twin 40 mm (1.57 in) Bofors guns; 4 × single 40 mm Bofors guns; 12 × 20 mm (0.79 in) Oerlikon cannons

Service record
- Operations: Normandy landings (6–13 June 1944)

HM LST-13 was an LST-1-class tank landing ship of the United States Navy built during World War II. She was transferred to the Royal Navy in April 1943, before being commissioned into the USN. Like many of her class, she was not named and is properly referred to by her hull designation.

== Construction ==
LST-13 was laid down on 1 September 1942, at Pittsburgh, Pennsylvania by the Dravo Corporation; launched on 5 January 1943; sponsored by Mrs. Jean A. Brackmann; transferred to the Royal Navy on 3 April 1943, and commissioned the same day.

== Service history ==
LST-13 left Galveston, Texas, on 10 April 1943, with Convoy HK 168, en route to Key West, Florida, arriving 14 April 1943.

LST-13 left from Halifax, Nova Scotia, for Liverpool on 18 May 1943, with convoy SC 131, carrying general cargo, however, due to defects she had to return to Halifax. She then sailed with convoy SC 132 on 26 May 1943, arriving in Liverpool 11 June 1943.

LST-13 was sent to the Clyde area where she remained until November 1943. She then sailed for Southampton but returned to Clydebank 31 December 1943. She was sent to the John Brown Shipbuilding & Engineering Shipyards to be converted into a Fighter Direction Tender, being redesignated FDT-13 in January 1944.

FDT-13 participated in the Invasion of Normandy from 6–13 June 1944. She provided aircraft control for both US and British fighters defending the main shipping route from the United Kingdom to the invasion beaches in France.

== Final disposition ==
FDT-13 was returned to the US Navy on 27 February 1946, at Norfolk, Virginia, and struck from the Naval Register on 5 June 1946. FDT-13 was sold on 11 October 1947, to Luria Brothers, Inc., Philadelphia, Pennsylvania.

== Bibliography ==
- "HM LST-13". NavSource. 11 August 2017.
- "LST-13". Dictionary of American Naval Fighting Ships. Naval History and Heritage Command. This article incorporates text from this source, which is in the public domain.
- "Convoy HK.170". Arnold Hague Convoy Database.
- "Convoy SC.131". Arnold Hague Convoy Database.
- "Convoy SC.132". Arnold Hague Convoy Database.
