= USS LST-3 =

1942 LST-1-class tank landing ship

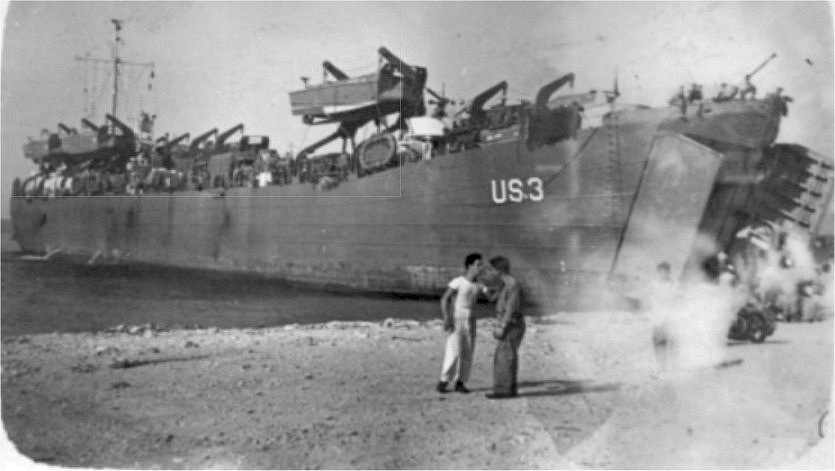
- USS LST-3 beached in southern France in September 1944. The additional davits for LCVPs are evident at the bow of the ship and near the original pair at the stern.

History

United States
- Name: LST-3
- Builder: Dravo Corporation, Pittsburgh, Pennsylvania
- Laid down: 29 June 1942
- Launched: 19 September 1942
- Sponsored by: Mrs. A.C. Harlow
- Commissioned: 8 February 1943
- Decommissioned: 23 December 1944
- Identification: Hull symbol: LST-3; Code letters: NDVG
- Honors and awards: 2 × battle stars
- Fate: Transferred to the Royal Navy

United Kingdom
- Name: LST-3
- Commissioned: 24 December 1944
- Decommissioned: 12 May 1946
- Fate: Returned to US Naval custody, 12 May 1946

United States
- Acquired: 12 May 1946
- Stricken: 19 June 1946
- Fate: Sold for scrapping, 10 September 1947

General characteristics
- Type: LST-1-class tank landing ship
- Displacement: 4,080 long tons (4,145 t) full load; 2,160 long tons (2,190 t) landing
- Length: 328 ft (100 m) oa
- Beam: 50 ft (15 m)
- Draft: Full load: 8 ft 2 in (2.49 m) forward; 14 ft 1 in (4.29 m) aft; Landing at 2,160 t: 3 ft 11 in (1.19 m) forward; 9 ft 10 in (3.00 m) aft
- Installed power: 2 × 900 hp (670 kW) Electro-Motive Diesel 12-567A diesel engines; 1,700 shp (1,300 kW)
- Propulsion: 1 × Falk main reduction gears; 2 × Propellers
- Speed: 12 kn (22 km/h; 14 mph)
- Range: 24,000 nmi (44,000 km; 28,000 mi) at 9 kn (17 km/h; 10 mph) while displacing 3,960 long tons (4,024 t)
- Boats & landing craft carried: 6 × LCVP
- Capacity: 2,100 tons oceangoing maximum; 350 tons main deckload
- Troops: 163
- Complement: 117
- Armament: Varied, ultimate armament; 2 × twin 40 mm (1.57 in) Bofors guns; 4 × single 40 mm Bofors guns; 12 × 20 mm (0.79 in) Oerlikon cannons

Service record
- Operations: Sicilian occupation (9–15 July, 28 July–17 August 1943); Invasion of southern France (15 August–25 September 1944)

USS LST-3 was an LST-1-class tank landing ship of the United States Navy built during World War II. She was transferred to the Royal Navy in December 1944. Like many of her class, she was not named and is properly referred to by her hull designation.

== Construction ==
LST-3 was laid down on 29 June 1942, at Pittsburgh, Pennsylvania by the Dravo Corporation; launched on 19 September 1942; sponsored by Mrs. A.C. Harlow; and commissioned on 8 February 1943.

== USN service history ==
LST-3 was assigned to the Mediterranean Theatre and participated in the following operations: the Allied invasion of Sicily in July and August 1943; and the Invasion of southern France from August to September 1944.

== Royal Navy service ==
LST-3 was decommissioned from the USN on 23 December 1944, in Bizerte, Tunisia, and commissioned into the Royal Navy the next day. She operated in the Mediterranean. She was returned to the United States April 1946 by a Royal Navy crew and turned back over to USN custody on 12 May 1946.

== Final disposition ==
LST-3 was struck from the Navy list on 19 June 1946. On 10 September 1947, she was sold to the Boston Metals Co., of Baltimore, Maryland, for scrapping.

== Awards ==

LST-3 earned two battle stars for World War II service.

== Bibliography ==
- "LST-3". Dictionary of American Naval Fighting Ships. Naval History and Heritage Command. This article incorporates text from this source, which is in the public domain.
- "LST-3". NavSource. 18 April 2014.
