= USS LST-4 =

1942 LST-1-class tank landing ship

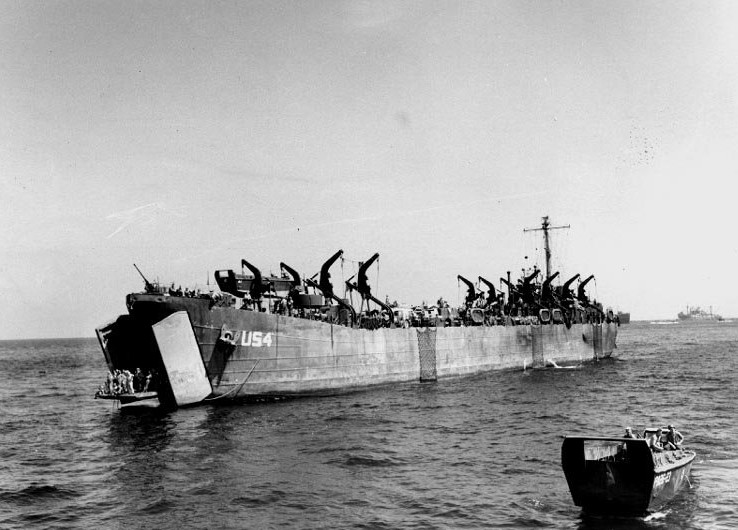
- USS LST-4 approaches the shore at Yellow Beach, Pampelonne Bay, France, 16 August 1944.

History

United States
- Name: LST-4
- Builder: Dravo Corporation, Pittsburgh, Pennsylvania
- Laid down: 4 July 1942
- Launched: 9 October 1942
- Sponsored by: Mrs. John (Jennie) Bartolo
- Commissioned: 14 February 1943
- Decommissioned: 23 December 1944
- Identification: Hull symbol: LST-4; Code letters: NFEN
- Honors and awards: 4 × battle stars
- Fate: Transferred to the Royal Navy
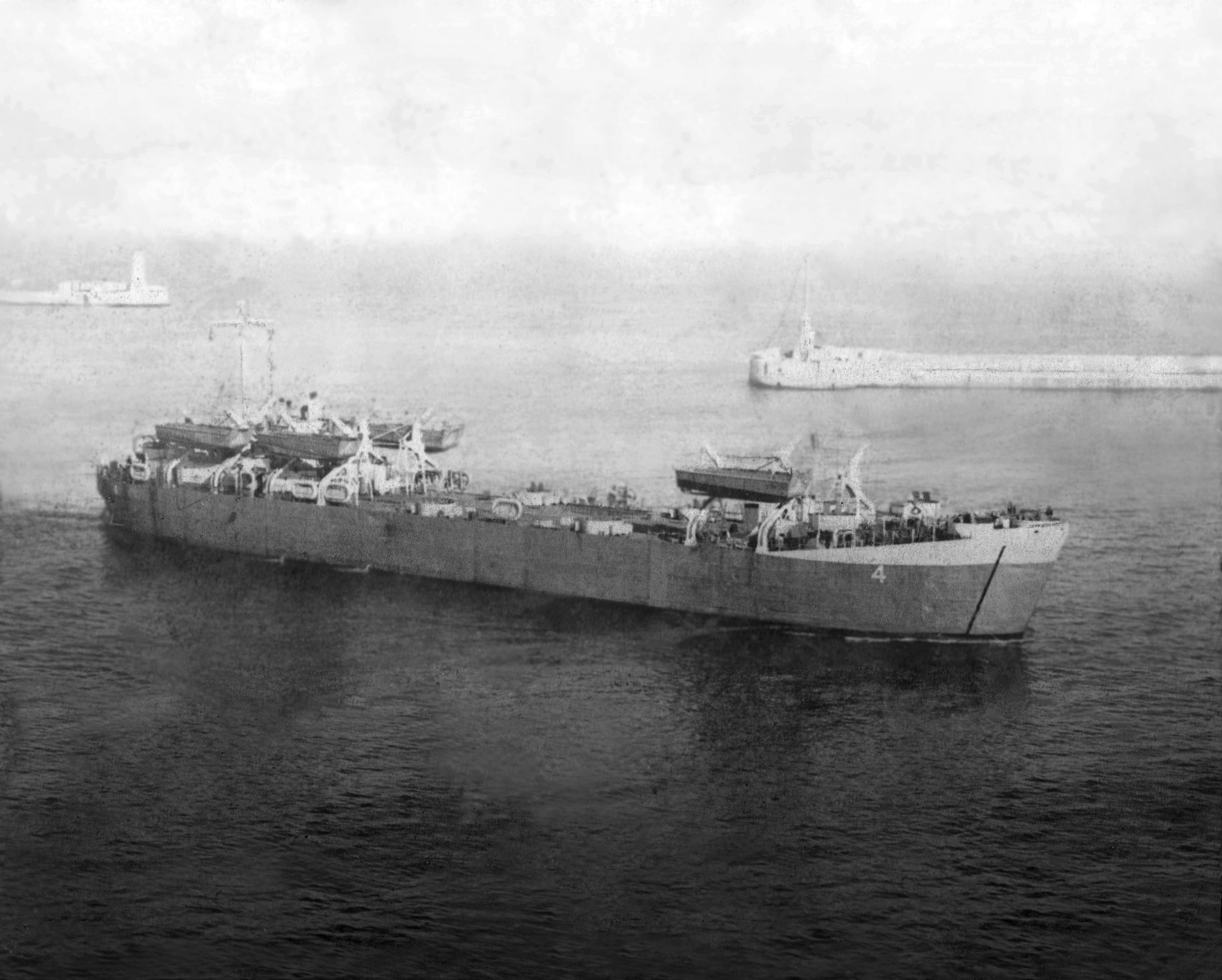
- HM LST-4 entering Malta Harbor in 1944.

United Kingdom
- Name: LST-4
- Commissioned: 24 December 1944
- Decommissioned: 1946
- Fate: Returned to US Naval custody, 1946

United States
- Acquired: 1946
- Stricken: 19 June 1946
- Fate: Sold for scrapping, 10 September 1947

General characteristics
- Type: LST-1-class tank landing ship
- Displacement: 4,080 long tons (4,145 t) full load; 2,160 long tons (2,190 t) landing
- Length: 328 ft (100 m) oa
- Beam: 50 ft (15 m)
- Draft: Full load: 8 ft 2 in (2.49 m) forward; 14 ft 1 in (4.29 m) aft; Landing at 2,160 t: 3 ft 11 in (1.19 m) forward; 9 ft 10 in (3.00 m) aft
- Installed power: 2 × 900 hp (670 kW) Electro-Motive Diesel 12-567A diesel engines; 1,700 shp (1,300 kW)
- Propulsion: 1 × Falk main reduction gears; 2 × Propellers
- Speed: 12 kn (22 km/h; 14 mph)
- Range: 24,000 nmi (44,000 km; 28,000 mi) at 9 kn (17 km/h; 10 mph) while displacing 3,960 long tons (4,024 t)
- Boats & landing craft carried: 6 × LCVP
- Capacity: 2,100 tons oceangoing maximum; 350 tons main deckload
- Troops: 163
- Complement: 117
- Armament: Varied, ultimate armament; 2 × twin 40 mm (1.57 in) Bofors guns; 4 × single 40 mm Bofors guns; 12 × 20 mm (0.79 in) Oerlikon cannons

Service record
- Operations: Sicilian occupation (9 July 1943); Salerno landings (9–21 September 1943); Anzio-Nettuno advanced landings (22 January–2 February 1944); Invasion of southern France (15 August–25 September 1944)

USS LST-4 was an LST-1-class tank landing ship of the United States Navy built during World War II. She was transferred to the Royal Navy in December 1944. Like many of her class, she was not named and is properly referred to by her hull designation.

== Construction ==
LST-4 was laid down on 4 July 1942, at Pittsburgh, Pennsylvania by the Dravo Corporation; launched on 9 October 1942; sponsored by Mrs. J. Bartolo; and commissioned on 14 February 1943.

== USN service history ==
LST-4 was assigned to the Mediterranean Theatre and participated in the following operations: the Allied invasion of Sicily in July 1943; the Salerno Landings in September 1943; the Anzio-Nettuno advanced landings on the west coast of Italy from January to February 1944; and the Invasion of southern France from August to September 1944.

== Royal Navy service ==
LST-4 was decommissioned from the USN on 23 December 1944, in Bizerte, Tunisia, and commissioned into the Royal Navy the next day. On 14 January 1945, while sailing between Taranto, Italy, and Piraeus, Greece, she struck a mine, but was still able to make Piraeus. She transferred to Alexandria, Egypt, in June, before making way for Malta, for repairs from 10 to 24 October 1945.

She was returned to the United States in early 1946, by a Royal Navy crew. En route she lost her port side screw and had to be towed by another LST to Norfolk, Virginia. She was turned back over to USN custody.

== Final disposition ==
LST-4 was struck from the Navy list on 19 June 1946. On 10 September 1947, she was sold to the Boston Metals Company, of Baltimore, Maryland, for scrapping.

== Awards ==

LST-4 earned four battle stars for World War II service.

== Bibliography ==
- "LST-4". Dictionary of American Naval Fighting Ships. Naval History and Heritage Command. This article incorporates text from this source, which is in the public domain.
- "LST-4". NavSource. 18 April 2014.
