= USS LST-2 =

1942 LST-1-class tank landing ship

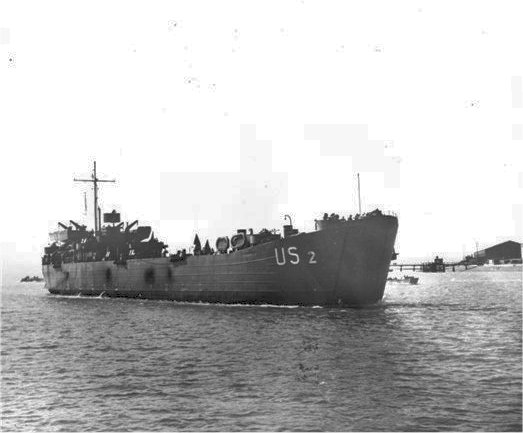
- USS LST-2 under way, location unknown, c. January–June 1944.

History

United States
- Name: LST-2
- Builder: Dravo Corporation, Pittsburgh, Pennsylvania
- Laid down: 23 June 1942
- Launched: 19 September 1942
- Sponsored by: Nancy Jane Hughes
- Commissioned: 22 December 1942
- Decommissioned: 29 November 1944
- Identification: Hull symbol: LST-2; Code letters: NDRU
- Honors and awards: 4 × battle stars
- Fate: Transferred to the Royal Navy, 29 November 1944
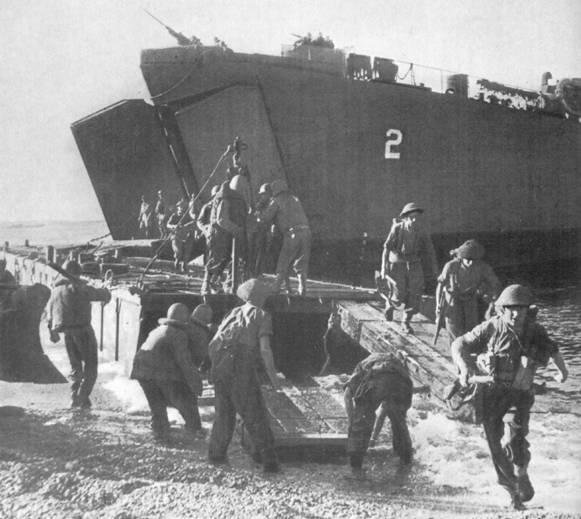
- British troops disembarking from LST-2 at Salerno on 9 September 1943.

United Kingdom
- Name: LST-2
- Acquired: 29 November 1944
- Commissioned: 29 November 1944
- Decommissioned: 11 April 1946
- Fate: Returned to US Naval, 13 April 1946

United States
- Acquired: 13 April 1946
- Stricken: 5 June 1946
- Fate: Sold, 5 December 1947

General characteristics
- Type: LST-1-class tank landing ship
- Displacement: 4,080 long tons (4,145 t) full load; 2,160 long tons (2,190 t) landing
- Length: 328 ft (100 m) oa
- Beam: 50 ft (15.2 m)
- Draft: Full load: 8 ft 2 in (2.49 m) forward; 14 ft 1 in (4.29 m) aft; Landing at 2,160 t: 3 ft 11 in (1.19 m) forward; 9 ft 10 in (3.00 m) aft
- Installed power: 2 × 900 hp (670 kW) Electro-Motive Diesel 12-567A diesel engines; 1,700 shp (1,300 kW)
- Propulsion: 1 × Falk main reduction gears; 2 × Propellers
- Speed: 12 kn (22 km/h; 14 mph)
- Range: 24,000 nmi (44,000 km; 28,000 mi) at 9 kn (17 km/h; 10 mph) while displacing 3,960 long tons (4,024 t)
- Boats & landing craft carried: 2 or 6 x LCVPs
- Capacity: 2,100 tons oceangoing maximum; 350 tons main deckload
- Troops: 163
- Complement: 117
- Armament: Varied, ultimate armament; 2 × twin 40 mm (1.57 in) Bofors guns; 4 × single 40 mm Bofors guns; 12 × 20 mm (0.79 in) Oerlikon cannons
- Armor: 15-lb. STS splinter protection

Service record
- Operations: North African occupation; Invasion of Sicily; Salerno landings; Invasion of Normandy

USS LST-2 was a LST(2) Landing Ship, Tank of World War II.

One of the first LST-1-class tank landing ships, she served with the United States Navy in World War II before she was transferred to the Royal Navy in November 1944.

At the end of the war she was returned to the US Navy before disposal.

== Construction ==
LST-2 was laid down on 23 June 1942, at Pittsburgh, Pennsylvania by the Dravo Corporation; launched on 19 September 1942; sponsored by Nancy Jane Hughes; and commissioned on 9 February 1943.

== USN service history ==
LST-2 was assigned to the European Theater. She participated in North African campaign prior to taking part in the Allied invasion of Sicily in July 1943. This was followed by the Allied invasion of Italy in September the same year. LST-2 then took part in the Invasion of Normandy in June 1944.

== Royal Navy service ==
LST-2 was decommissioned from the USN and commissioned into the Royal Navy on 29 November 1944, as HM LST-2. She performed sea trials December 1944, in Scotland. She then prepared for Far East service between December 1944 and August 1945, at Tyne. LST-2 sailed from Southampton on 17 August 1945, for Bombay, India, via Port Said, Egypt, and the Suez Canal, arriving at her destination on 21 September 1945. She had railroad tracks installed and made various trips between the ports of Madras, India, Singapore, and Trincomalee, Sri Lanka. She was returned to the US Navy in Subic Bay on 13 April 1946, and struck on 5 June 1947.

== Final disposition ==
On 5 December 1947, she was sold to Bosey, Philippines.

== Awards ==

LST-2 earned four battle stars for World War II service.

== Bibliography ==
- "LST-2". Dictionary of American Naval Fighting Ships. Naval History and Heritage Command. 30 July 2015. This article incorporates text from this source, which is in the public domain.
- "LST-2". NavSource. 18 April 2014.
