= USS Wiseman =

Buckley-class destroyer escort

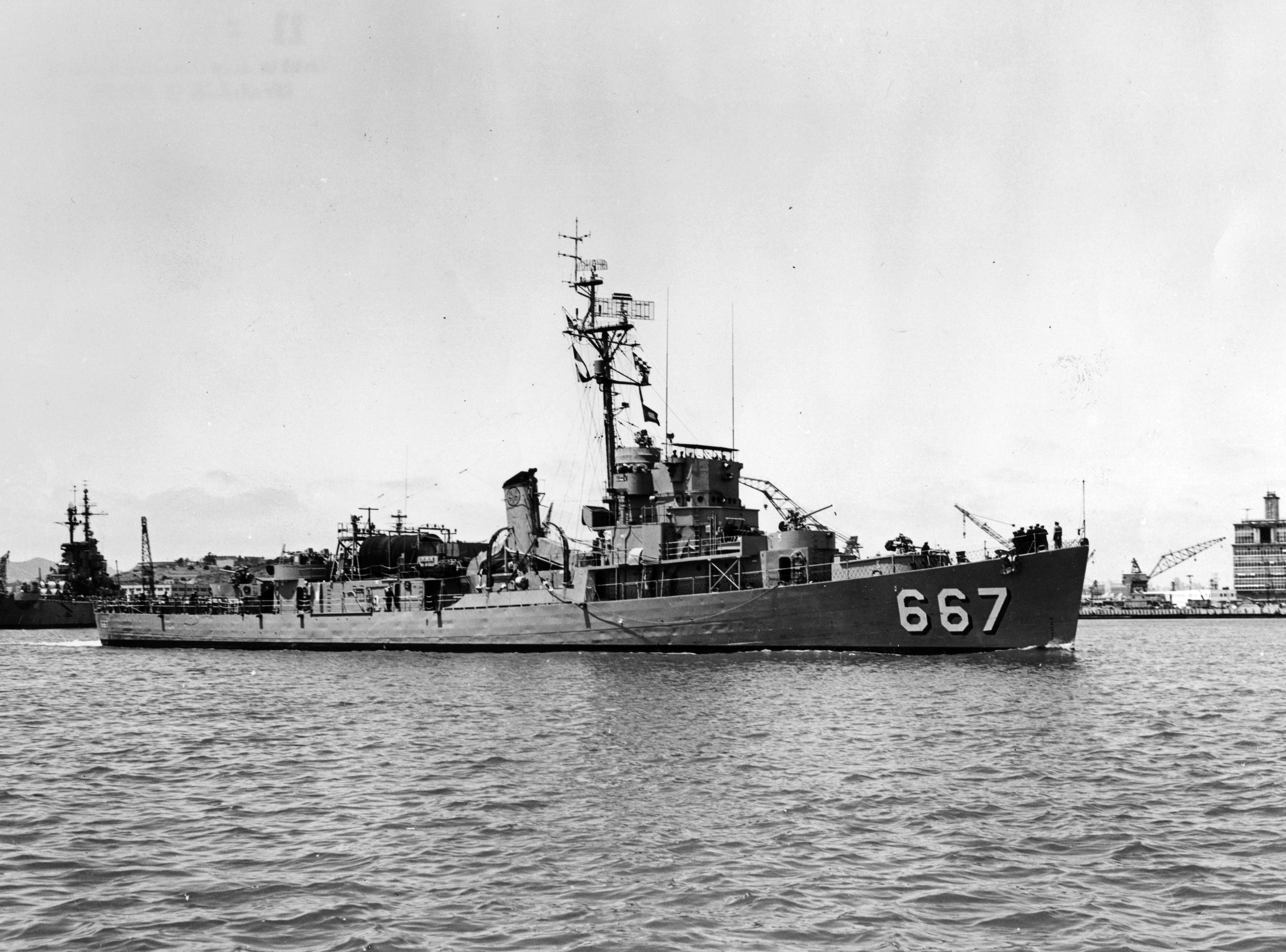

History

United States
- Laid down: 26 July 1943
- Launched: 6 November 1943
- Commissioned: 4 April 1944 – 31 May 1946; 11 September 1950 – 16 May 1959; 2 October 1961 – 1 August 1962
- In service: 16 May 1959 – 2 October 1961; 1 August 1962 – 15 April 1973
- Stricken: 15 April 1973
- Fate: Sold for scrap, 29 April 1974; Removed from Navy custody, 22 May 1974

General characteristics
- Displacement: 1,740 tons full; 1,400 tons, standard
- Length: 306 ft 0 in (93.27 m)
- Beam: 36 ft 9 in (11.20 m)
- Draft: 13 ft 6 in (4.11 m)
- Propulsion: GE turbo-electric drive, 12,000 shp (8.9 MW); two propellers
- Speed: 24 knots (44 km/h)
- Range: 4,940 nautical miles (9,150 km) at 12 knots (22 km/h)
- Complement: 15 officers, 198 men
- Armament: 3 × 3 in (76 mm) DP guns, 3 × 21 in (53 cm) torpedo tubes, 1 × 1.1 in (28 mm) quad AA gun, 8 × 20 mm cannon, 1 × hedgehog projector, 2 × depth charge tracks, 8 × K-gun depth charge projectors

USS Wiseman (DE-667) was a Buckley-class destroyer escort in service with the United States Navy for several periods between 1944 and 1973. She was scrapped in 1974.

The ship was named for Osborne Beeman Wiseman, who was a naval aviator killed during the Battle of Midway in June 1942.

== Construction and commissioning ==
Wiseman was laid down on 26 July 1943 at Pittsburgh, Pennsylvania, by the Dravo Corp.; launched on 6 November 1943; sponsored by Mrs. June Holton, the widow of Lt.(jg.) Wiseman; and commissioned at Algiers, Louisiana, on 4 April 1944.

== 1944–1948 ==
Following shakedown in the Bermuda area and post-shakedown availability in the Boston Navy Yard, Wiseman departed Boston on 24 May 1944 to rendezvous with Task Force 64 (TF 64) and convoy UGS-43 on the first of three round-trip convoy escort runs. She escorted convoy GUS-43 from Casablanca, French Morocco, to New York City, then left Hampton Roads with TF-64 and convoy UGS-50 on 3 August, shepherding convoy GUS-50 from Bizerte to the United States, sailing eastward on 29 August. Following repairs and alterations at Boston (19 September – 5 October), Wiseman conducted work-ups in the waters of Casco Bay, Maine, before resuming convoy escort work as part of TF-64, shepherding UGS-57 from Hampton Roads to Bizerte, returning eastward with TF-64 and GUS-57; passing Gibraltar on 11 November, the ship returned to Chesapeake Bay with that portion of GUS-57 on 30 November, before proceeding to Charleston, South Carolina

Subsequently, converted to a floating power station – the necessity for ship-to-shore electrical facilities haying been proved during the Pacific war – at the Charleston Navy Yard, Wiseman sailed for the Pacific on 11 January 1945. Reporting to Commander in Chief, Pacific Fleet, for duty on 17 January 1945 upon transiting the Panama Canal, she set course for the Hawaiian Islands in company with the high speed transport USS Reeves (APD-52).

Making port at Pearl Harbor on 3 February, the destroyer escort operated for a month in the Hawaiian Islands before setting sail for the Philippines on 3 March. Arriving at Manila on the 23d, she commenced furnishing power to that nearly demolished city on 13 April and, over the next five and one-half months, provided some 5,806,000 kilowatt-hours (20,900 GJ) of electricity. In addition, Wiseman's evaporators furnished 150,000 gallons (570 m³) of drinking water to Army facilities in the harbor area and to many small craft. Her radios were also utilized to a great extent. Placed at the disposal of the Navy's port director, the ship's communication outfit was used to handle harbor radio traffic until the director's equipment arrived and was installed ashore.

Following her vital service at Manila and projected operations at Ketchikan, Alaska, shelved, Wiseman shifted to Guam, arriving on 18 December 1945, where she provided power for the Army dredge Harris (YM-25). Departing Guam on 26 March 1946, in company with sister ship USS Whitehurst (DE-634), she paused at Eniwetok, in the Marshalls (28–29 March), then returned to the United States via Pearl Harbor (4–6 April 1946). Decommissioned at San Diego, California on 31 May 1946, Wiseman was placed in inactivated status on 19 December 1946, then out of commission, in reserve, on 3 February 1947, and moved to Long Beach. Subsequently, the auxiliary ocean tug USS Koka (ATA-185) towed Wiseman from Long Beach back to San Diego (16–17 November 1948).

== 1950–1961 ==
After the outbreak of hostilities in Korea in the summer of 1950, the Chief of Naval Operations recommended that Wiseman be "reactivated at the earliest practicable [time] for distant duty including use as [an] Electric Power Supply Ship." Accordingly, Wiseman was recommissioned at San Diego on 11 September 1950, and rushed to Korea, reaching the port of Masan, near the mouth of the Naktong River, at the western anchor-point of the former beachhead at Pusan. As she had done at Manila in 1945, Wiseman supplied electricity to a city unable to generate its own. Later, the ship provided comforts-of-home to units of the 1st Marine Division quartered on the nearby pier, providing hot showers, cigarettes, and hot meals cooked in the ship's galley. The destroyer escort also provided instruction in seamanship, gunnery, radar, sonar, and damage control to 80 midshipmen from the Republic of Korea Naval Academy and 120 ROK Navy enlisted men.

Late in 1951, Wiseman returned to the United States and underwent an extensive overhaul at the Mare Island Naval Shipyard, Vallejo, California, before she conducted refresher training out of San Diego through the spring and summer of 1952. The ship then sailed again for Korean waters, reaching the combat zone that autumn.

In her second Western Pacific (WestPac) deployment since recommissioning, Wiseman screened light carrier task forces off the west coast of Korea; carried out patrol assignments close inshore; blockaded and bombarded segments of the northeastern Korean coast, and provided antisubmarine screen and escort services for replenishment groups. Later in the deployment, she also participated in hunter-killer operations, trained in antisubmarine warfare (ASW) evolutions, and served as division flagship during a goodwill call at Manila.

Over the next few years, Wiseman conducted four more WestPac deployments and spent the interludes between them in training out of San Diego and upkeep at Mare Island Naval Shipyard or the San Francisco Naval Shipyard. Upon occasion, she conducted Naval Reserve training cruises – one taking her to the Hawaiian Islands. During the overseas deployments, Wiseman operated with units of SEATO navies – Australian, New Zealand, British, Philippine, Pakistani, and Thai – and visited ports from Australia to Japan. Upon completion of her sixth deployment, Wiseman was designated as a Group I Naval Reserve Training (NRT) ship. Accordingly, on 16 May 1959, the ship was decommissioned and turned over to the 11th Naval District. Lt. W. V. Powell was the first officer-in-charge.

For the next two years, Wiseman operated out of San Diego on NRT duties. Every third weekend of the month, a reserve cruise took her to sea for periods of ASW training; and, during the summers, the destroyer escort made two-week reserve cruises.

== 1961 – 1973 ==
In 1961, however, the crisis in Berlin changed Wiseman's routine after the building of the Berlin Wall heightened tensions in August of that year. President John F. Kennedy ordered the activation of reserve units – including the Selected Reserve Crew and NRT ships. Recommissioned on 2 October 1961, Lt.Comdr. C. V. Wilhoite, Jr., in command, Wiseman was immediately prepared for duty with the 7th Fleet. Since the repair and overhaul facilities at San Diego were overworked, Wiseman was overhauled at Long Beach, spending the pre-Christmas holidays in the Bethlehem shipyards there.

Deploying to WestPac again in January 1962, Wiseman conducted patrol operations off the coast of South Vietnam and participated in the Kennedy Administration's "People to People" program. She received a "well done" for her performance of duty and in March, while conducting training operations with the South Vietnamese Navy, won commendation for giving medical aid to a fisherman with an infected leg on board a South Vietnamese fishing junk. Later that spring, the ship also visited Hong Kong, Subic Bay, and Japanese ports – including Yokohama, where she hosted celebrations for Armed Forces Day on 19 and 20 May.

Returning to San Diego on 17 July, via Midway and Pearl Harbor, Wiseman was decommissioned and placed in service on 1 August, resuming her duties as NRT ship with the Group II Naval Reserve. Before the end of 1962, the ship was assigned to Reserve Destroyer Division 272 of Reserve Destroyer Squadron 27.

Placed in reserve but remaining in service, Wiseman was berthed at San Diego through the remainder of the 1960s as part of the Pacific Fleet's reserve units. The veteran of World War II and Korean service was stricken from the Navy list on 15 April 1973, and sold for scrapping 29 April 1974, to Levin Metals Corp., San Jose, California for the sum of $65,000. The ship was removed from Navy custody on 22 May 1974.

Wiseman (DE-667) received six battle stars for her Korean War service.
