= USS LST-1039 =

US Navy landing ship

History
- Name: LST-1039 (1944–1946); Tinian; Iraty
- Operator: United States Navy (1945–1946); Columbia River Packers Association (1947–?); Cooperative Maritime Itsasokoa (unknown)
- Builder: Dravo Corporation
- Laid down: 26 November 1944
- Launched: 6 January 1945
- Commissioned: 9 February 1945
- Decommissioned: 21 June 1946
- Fate: Sold, 2 September 1947

General characteristics
- Class & type: LST-542-class tank landing ship
- Displacement: 1,623 short tons (1,472 t) (light); 3,800 short tons (3,400 t) (full load)
- Length: 327 ft 9 in (99.90 m)
- Beam: 50 ft 1.5 in (15.278 m)
- Installed power: 1,800 hp (1,300 kW)
- Propulsion: 2 × diesel engines; 2 × propellers
- Range: 23,000 nmi (43,000 km; 26,000 mi) at 8.75 knots (16.21 km/h; 10.07 mph)
- Complement: 7 officers, 104 enlisted
- Armament: Intended: 2 × twin 40 mm (1.6 in) guns; 4 × single 40 mm (1.6 in) guns; 12 × single 20 mm (0.79 in) guns

USS LST-1039 was a LST-542-class Landing Ship Tank of the United States Navy. Launched in 1944, she operated in the Pacific Theater during World War II during the Battle of Okinawa and ensuing occupation. Following the war, she was sold into civilian use and operated as a factory ship for at least the next 40 years.

== Development and design ==
Before the 1930s, amphibious assaults typically relied on ships' boats to ferry troops and equipment ashore, often with little enemy resistance. However, the introduction of mechanized armies required specialized vessels that could cross oceans to deliver large, heavy, vehicles–such as tanks–directly onto a beachhead. The British developed the first Landing Ship Tanks (LSTs) in 1941. These vessels featured a shallow draft and a bow-mounted ramp that allowed vehicles to drive directly onto land. An anchor at the stern enabled the ship to pull herself free after intentionally beaching on shore. By early 1942, the United States began constructing LSTs based on the same principles. In late 1943, the LST-542 class was a refined version of the second generation LST(2) design, which incorporated war-time experience including a weather deck capable of carrying heavy cargo, more anti-air defenses, and a greater displacement.

The LST-542 class featured a length of 327 feet 9 inches (99.90 m) and beam of 50 feet 1.5 inches (15.278 m). While at sea, the fully loaded draft ranged from 7 feet 1 inch (2.16 m) in the bow and 13 feet 6 inches (4.11 m) in the aft to 3 feet 1 inch (0.94 m) and 9 feet 6 inches (2.90 m) when beached. The vessels featured a light displacement of 1,623 short tons (1,472 t), loaded displacement of 3,800 short tons (3,400 t), and a deadweight (cargo) capacity of 1,900 short tons (1,700 t), which was capable of carrying up to 20 M4 Sherman tanks or 70 trucks across the tank and weather decks. They were propelled by two V12 900 horsepower (670 kW) General Motors 12-567 diesel engines that provided an economic cruising speed of 8.75 knots (16.21 km/h; 10.07 mph) for a range of 23,000 nautical miles (43,000 km; 26,000 mi) through two propellers. Armament on LSTs varied widely between ships due to differences in shipyards, wartime modifications, supply shortages, and weapons provided by embarked troops. The ideal anti-air suite consisted of two twin 40-millimeter (1.6 in), four single 40 mm (1.6 in), and twelve single 20 mm (0.79 in) guns. Crew requirements also differed, with LSTs that retained davits to carry two Higgins boats were operated by seven officers and 104 enlisted sailors.

== Service history ==
LST-1039 was laid down on 26 November 1944 by the Dravo Corporation in Pittsburgh, Pennsylvania, launched on 6 January 1945, and commissioned on 9 February 1945. Once in service, she was assigned to the Pacific Theater and participated in the invasion and occupation of Okinawa in June. When World War II ended, the landing ship operated with American occupation forces in the region before she was recalled to the United States in April 1946. On 21 June 1946, she was decommissioned and struck from the Navy List on 31 July, and was sold to the Columbia River Packers Association on 2 September 1947. Her new owners retrofitted the vessel as a Honduran factory ship and renamed her Tinian. By 1962, she was owned by the Cooperative Maritime Itsasokoa and operated out of Bayonne, France, under the name Iraty for at least the next two decades.
