= USS LST-59 =

1943 LST-1-class tank landing ship

History

United States
- Name: USS LST-59
- Builder: Dravo Corporation, Pittsburgh, Pennsylvania
- Laid down: 7 November 1943
- Launched: 18 December 1943
- Commissioned: 31 January 1944
- Decommissioned: 21 January 1946
- Stricken: 25 February 1946
- Honours and awards: 1 battle star (WWII)
- Fate: Sold for scrapping, September 1947

General characteristics
- Class & type: LST-1-class tank landing ship
- Displacement: 1,780 long tons (1,809 t) light; 3,880 long tons (3,942 t) full
- Length: 328 ft (100 m)
- Beam: 50 ft (15 m)
- Draft: Unloaded: Bow: 2 ft 4 in (0.71 m); Stern: 7 ft 6 in (2.29 m); Loaded : Bow: 8 ft 2 in (2.49 m); Stern: 14 ft 1 in (4.29 m)
- Depth: 8 ft (2.4 m) forward, 14 ft 4 in (4.37 m) aft (full load)
- Propulsion: 2 General Motors 12-567 diesel engines, two shafts, twin rudders
- Speed: 12 knots (22 km/h; 14 mph)
- Boats & landing craft carried: Two or six LCVPs
- Troops: 14-16 officers, 131-147 enlisted men
- Complement: 7-9 officers, 104-120 enlisted men
- Armament: 2 × twin 40 mm gun mounts w/Mk.51 directors; 4 × single 40 mm gun mounts; 12 × single 20 mm gun mounts

USS LST-59 was a LST-1-class tank landing ship which earned one battle star for service in World War II.

The ship was laid down by the Dravo Corporation of Pittsburgh, Pennsylvania, on 7 November 1943. Launched on 18 December 1943, sponsored by Mrs. Richard A. Lewis. Commissioned on 31 January 1944.

Between 6–25 June 1944 LST-59 participated in the invasion of Normandy. On 29 June 1944 the 5th Naval Beach Battalion returned from Normandy to England aboard.

The ship was decommissioned on 21 January 1946, and struck from the Navy List on 25 February 1946. Subsequently, sold to Southern Shipwrecking Company of New Orleans in September 1947, and scrapped.

== See also ==
- List of United States Navy LSTs
