= USS LST-53 =

LST-1-class landing ship tank

History

United States
- Name: LST-53
- Builder: Dravo Corp., Neville Island
- Laid down: 24 September 1943
- Launched: 6 November 1943
- Sponsored by: Mrs. Nicholas Spanard
- Commissioned: 21 December 1943
- Decommissioned: 22 January 1946
- Renamed: APL-59, September 1954; Q021, 19 January 1946
- Identification: Callsign: NFCU
- Honors and awards: See Awards
- Fate: Transferred to South Korea, 11 May 1955

History

South Korea
- Name: Chang Su; (장수)
- Namesake: Chang Su
- Acquired: 11 May 1955
- Decommissioned: 18 April 1959
- Identification: Pennant number: LST-811
- Fate: Unknown

General characteristics
- Class & type: LST-1-class tank landing ship
- Displacement: 4,080 long tons (4,145 t) full load; 2,160 long tons (2,190 t) landing
- Length: 328 ft (100 m) oa
- Beam: 50 ft (15 m)
- Draft: Full load: 8 ft 2 in (2.49 m) forward; 14 ft 1 in (4.29 m) aft; Landing at 2,160 t: 3 ft 11 in (1.19 m) forward; 9 ft 10 in (3.00 m) aft
- Installed power: 2 × 900 hp (670 kW) Electro-Motive Diesel 12-567A diesel engines; 1,700 shp (1,300 kW)
- Propulsion: 1 × Falk main reduction gears; 2 × Propellers
- Speed: 12 kn (22 km/h; 14 mph)
- Range: 24,000 nmi (44,000 km; 28,000 mi) at 9 kn (17 km/h; 10 mph) while displacing 3,960 long tons (4,024 t)
- Boats & landing craft carried: 2 or 6 x LCVPs
- Capacity: 2,100 tons oceangoing maximum; 350 tons main deckload
- Troops: 16 officers, 147 enlisted men
- Complement: 13 officers, 104 enlisted men
- Armament: Varied, ultimate armament; 2 × twin 40 mm (1.57 in) Bofors guns; 4 × single 40 mm Bofors guns; 12 × 20 mm (0.79 in) Oerlikon cannons

USS LST-53 was a LST-1-class tank landing ship in the United States Navy during World War II. She was later sold to South Korean Navy as ROKS Chang Su (LST-811).

== Construction and career ==
LST-53 was laid down on 24 September 1943 at Dravo Corp., Neville Island, Pennsylvania. Launched on 6 November 1943 and commissioned on 21 December 1943. She was in ferrying service to New Orleans to undergo fitting out from 5 December to 21 December 1943.

=== Service in the United States ===
During World War II, LST-53 was assigned to the Europe-Africa-Middle East theater and later the Asiatic-Pacific theater. She took part in the invasion of Normandy from 6 to 25 June 1944 and the invasion of Southern France from 15 August to 25 September 1944.

She then participated in the assault and occupation of Okinawa from 17 to 30 June 1945.

LST-53 was decommissioned on 22 January 1946 and was assigned to Commander Naval Forces Far East (COMNAVFE) Shipping Control Authority for Japan (SCAJAP) in which she was designated Q021. She was put into the Reserve Fleet following the end of her service there and later loaned to South Korea.

She was struck from the Navy Register.

=== Service in South Korea ===
ROKS Chang Su was acquired by the South Korean Navy on 11 May 1955 and was commissioned on an unknown date.

She was decommissioned on 18 April 1959 and her fate is unknown.

== Awards ==
LST-53 have earned the following awards:

- American Campaign Medal
- Combat Action Ribbon
- Europe-Africa-Middle East Campaign Medal (2 battle stars)
- Asiatic-Pacific Campaign Medal (1 battle star)
- World War II Victory Medal
- Navy Occupation Service Medal (with Asia clasp)

== Sources ==
- United States. Dept. of the Treasury (1962). Treasury Decisions Under the Customs, Internal Revenue, Industrial Alcohol, Narcotic and Other Laws, Volume 97. U.S. Government Printing Office.
- Moore, Capt. John (1984). Jane's Fighting Ships 1984-85. Jane's Information Group. ISBN 978-0710607959.
- Saunders, Stephen (2009). Jane's Fighting Ships 2009-2010. Jane's Information Group. ISBN 978-0710628886.
- Fairplay International Shipping Journal Volume 222. United Kingdom: Fairplay Publishing Limited. 1967.
