= USS LST-740 =

WW2 US navy landing ship tank

History

United States
- Name: USS LST-740
- Builder: Dravo Corporation Neville Island Pennsylvania
- Laid down: 12 February 1944
- Launched: 8 April 1944
- Sponsored by: Miss A. Jean Blocker
- Commissioned: 15 May 1944
- Decommissioned: 8 March 1946
- Stricken: 12 April 1946
- Honors and awards: 5 battle stars (World War II)
- Fate: Sold 14 June 1948

General characteristics
- Class & type: LST-542-class tank landing ship
- Displacement: 1,625 long tons (1,651 t) light; 4,080 long tons (4,145 t) full
- Length: 328 ft (100 m)
- Beam: 50 ft (15 m)
- Draft: Unloaded : 2 ft 4 in (0.71 m) forward; 7 ft 6 in (2.29 m) aft; Loaded : 8 ft 2 in (2.49 m) forward; 14 ft 1 in (4.29 m) aft
- Propulsion: 2 × General Motors 12-567 diesel engines, two shafts, twin rudders
- Speed: 12 knots (22 km/h; 14 mph)
- Boats & landing craft carried: 2 LCVPs
- Troops: 16 officers, 147 enlisted men
- Complement: 7 officers, 104 enlisted men
- Armament: 1 × single 3"/50 caliber gun mount; 8 × 40 mm guns; 12 × 20 mm guns

USS LST-740 was an LST-542-class tank landing ship laid down on 12 February 1944 by the Dravo Corporation at Neville Island. She was launched on 8 April 1944, sponsored by Miss A. Jean Blocker, and commissioned on 15 May 1944.

During World War II, LST-740 was assigned to the Asiatic-Pacific theater and participated in the Morotai landings—September 1944; the Leyte landings—October and November 1944; the Lingayen Gulf landing—January 1945; the Mindanao Island landings—April 1945; and the Balikpapan operation—June and July 1945.

Following the war, LST-740 performed occupation duty in the Far East until late October 1945. She returned to the United States and was decommissioned on 8 March 1946 and struck from the Navy list on 12 April that same year. On 14 June 1948, the ship was sold to the Oil Transport Co., of New Orleans, Louisiana, for non-self-propelled operation.

LST-740 earned five battle stars for World War II service.
