= YNg-28 =

History

United States
- Builder: Dravo Corporation, Neville Island, Pennsylvania, U.S.
- Laid down: 1942; 84 years ago
- In service: 1942; 84 years ago
- Out of service: 1945; 81 years ago
- Fate: Disposed of on 1 June 1975

General characteristics
- Class & type: YNg-1
- Displacement: 110 long tons (112 t)
- Length: 110 ft 0 in (33.53 m)
- Beam: 34 ft 0 in (10.36 m)
- Draft: 4 ft 0 in (1.22 m)
- Propulsion: non self propelled
- Complement: 3 officers, 15 crew
- Armament: unknown

YNg-28 was a YNg-1-class net laying ship of the United States Navy. Her primary purpose was to maintain gates in harbor net defensive systems.

YNg-28 was laid down in 1942 by the Dravo Corporation Neville Island, Pennsylvania and allocated to the 11th Naval District.

== Pacific Theater operations ==
She was shifted to the Pacific Theater some time between 1942 and 1945. In late 1944 she was reportedly towed from San Francisco to Hawai'i, then from Hawai'i to Ulithi Atoll before finally being towed to Buckner Bay (Nakagusuku Wan) off Okinawa's east coast as part of the Invasion Fleet supporting the Battle of Okinawa. She was present off Okinawa during Typhoon Louise in October 1945, where she sustained an unknown amount of damage. YNg-28 likely returned to the 12th Naval District and was removed from service in late 1945 or early 1946.

== Decommissioning ==
YNg-28 was placed out of service and struck from the Naval Register at unknown dates. The vessel was scrapped in 1975.
