= Flight 185 =

Flight 185 may refer to:

Listed chronologically

- SilkAir Flight 185, crashed on 19 December 1997
- Air Tahoma Flight 185, crashed on 13 August 2004
- Harmony Jets Flight 185, crashed on 23 December 2025

== See also ==
- SilkAir 185: Pilot Suicide?, a 2006 documentary about the above noted 1997 crash
