= Class 185 =

Class 185 may refer to:

- Alstom Traxx, Deutsche Bahn Class 185 diesel locomotive
- British Rail Class 185, A diesel multiple unit built by Siemens for the UK market

== See also ==
- 185 series, a Japanese electric-multiple-unit train type
- KiHa 185 series, a Japanese diesel-multiple-unit train type
- Class (disambiguation)
- 185
