= Bonny Hicks =

Singaporean model (1968-1997)

- Born: Bonny Susan Hicks; 5 January 1968; Kuala Lumpur, Malaysia
- Died: 19 December 1997 (aged 29); Palembang, South Sumatra, Indonesia
- Occupations: Catwalk model, writer

Bonny Susan Hicks (5 January 1968 – 19 December 1997) was a Singaporean model and writer. After garnering local fame as a model, she gained worldwide recognition for her contributions to Singaporean post-colonial literature and the anthropic philosophy conveyed in her works. Her first book, Excuse Me, Are You A Model?, is recognised as a significant milestone in the literary and cultural history of Singapore. Hicks later published a second book, Discuss Disgust, and many shorter pieces in press outlets, including a short-lived opinion column in a major Singaporean daily that was pulled due to public dissent from Singaporean traditionalists.

Hicks died at age 29 on 19 December 1997 aboard SilkAir Flight 185 when it crashed into the Musi River on the Indonesian island of Sumatra. The U.S.'s National Transportation Safety Board (NTSB) expressed the likelihood that the crash was an act of suicide and mass murder by the troubled Singaporean pilot. All 97 passengers and 7 crew members perished.

After Hicks' death, numerous publications including the book Heaven Can Wait: Conversations with Bonny Hicks by Tal Ben-Shahar featured her life and thought. Although she was deemed controversial by many during her lifetime because of her willingness to openly discuss human sexuality, Singaporean literary scholars during the last years of Hicks' life saw in her a pivotally important voice for interpreting their contemporary society.

Hicks' legacy is one of an important transitional social figure between traditionalist Singapore and the broad-scale societal changes that occurred in the country under the forces of globalisation as the 21st century approached. Her death resulted in the loss of a Singaporean national voice that was both growing and important yet internally conflicted while socially confrontive. Criticisms by Singaporean traditionalists during her modelling and authoring careers continually vexed Hicks' conscience and drove her to re-evaluate her life during her later years. Hicks ultimately made a sustained series of traditionalist choices during her final years of life.

== Early life ==
Hicks was born in 1968 in Kuala Lumpur, Malaysia, to a British father, Ron Hicks, and a Cantonese-speaking Singaporean-Chinese mother, Betty Soh. Her parents separated shortly after her birth and Soh relocated to Singapore in 1969 with her infant daughter. There, Hicks' formative social environment was multi-ethnic, multi-lingual, and included Malays, Indians, and Chinese of various dialect groups. Although Hicks was biracial, she identified as Chinese during her early childhood, speaking Cantonese and watching Chinese-language television at home.

When Hicks was twelve, her mother accepted a job as a caretaker of a bungalow in Sentosa, Singapore, and they relocated to the island away from a Singaporean Housing and Development Board flat in Toa Payoh. Throughout her teens, Hicks lived with her mother on Sentosa Island, and intermittently with her porpor (grandmother) with whom she enjoyed a particularly close relationship.

Hicks never met her father. At aged sixteen, she traced his whereabouts through the British High Commission, with whom he was stationed on Singapore during Hicks' conception. Married with children from his new arrangement, and likely keeping his past muffled from his new family, Hicks' father returned word via fax to her that he wanted nothing to do with her. Despite Hicks' superficial joking whenever publicly questioned about it, her father's rejection of her remained deeply hurtful to Hicks throughout her life.

Hicks' early years were marked by "few friends" and she stated that she made no serious friends after age 15—that is, until she met Patricia Chan Li-Yin, but even then things were hard to define. After Chan retired from being a Singaporean sports hero, a decorated female swimmer, she became a magazine editor and talent agent. After Hicks' and Chan's paths crossed, Chan become a pivotally important person in Hicks' life and career. The relationship was often confused and complicated by even Hicks' own account.

== Finding fame ==
=== Discovery and first mentor ===
Chan "discovered" the nineteen-year-old Bonnie Hicks shortly after Hicks completed her A levels at the Hwa Chong Junior College. Hicks and Chan enjoyed a close, multi-leveled, complicated relationship that was both professional and personal. Hicks referred to Chan as "Mum", and some surmised that there was perhaps more to the relationship. Stemming from ambiguous statements Hicks later made in her first book, (e.g., "I was in love with Pat Chan"), Singaporeans widely speculated whether the two were involved in a lesbian relationship. While the statements in Hicks' book could be interpreted as indicating only an intimate mentoring relationship with Chan, whom Hicks clearly idealized and greatly admired, she continued to be ambiguous on the subject whenever questioned. This created a sense of mystery about Hicks' persona and contributed to her ongoing buzz and publicity.

=== Modeling ===
Hicks' modelling career began with a showcase in the September 1987 cover of a now-defunct Singaporean fashion monthly, GO. In a short while, she expanded into other modelling outlets, including ones in Indonesia. She continued to expand her appearances on magazine covers, print advertisements, catwalk appearances in designer clothes, and in a music video for a top-10 hit by the Singaporean indie band The Oddfellows. Things looked bright.

A year into Hicks' modelling career, she began writing about her life experiences and ideas stemming from her modelling. By age twenty-one she had completed her first book, Excuse Me, are you a Model? She continued to model for five more years and in 1992, at the age of twenty-four, released her second book Discuss Disgust. Hicks then left modelling to take a job as a department lead and copywriter in Jakarta, Indonesia. At the time, Hicks reiterated a statement she had made in her first book: that she had never wanted to be a model in the first place. Instead, her dream since age thirteen had been to be a writer. It was then that she had begun keeping a diary of her feelings and experiences, a practice she continued throughout her life. Hicks drew from her documented memories in each of her writings.

== Literary contributions and controversy ==
=== Excuse Me, Are You a Model? ===
Hicks published her first work Excuse Me, Are You a Model? in Singapore in 1990. The book is her autobiographical exposé of the modelling and fashion world and contains frequent, candid discussion about her sexuality, a subject that was not traditionally broached in Singaporean society at the time. The work stirred significant controversy among Singaporeans who held traditional literary and moral standards. Traditionalists considered Hicks' work a "kiss and tell" book that disclosed "too much too soon" from an independent woman still in her early twenties. Singaporean youth, on the other hand, had a starkly different view; twelve thousand copies were sold within two weeks, prompting the book's publisher to boast Hicks' work as "the biggest book sensation in the annals of Singapore publishing."

During the years leading up to her death, Singaporean English literature scholars had begun to recognise more than just a simple generational divide in the reactions to Hicks' book, and were describing it as "an important work" in the confessional mode of the genre of post-colonial literature. Well before Hick's book was deemed "a significant milestone in Singapore's literary and cultural history," Singaporean young people had already established a localized literary movement, following Hicks' lead. Local markets soon became inundated with the autobiographies of fame-seeking youth, many not yet in their twenties.

=== Discuss Disgust ===
In 1992, two years after Hicks' controversial entry into Singapore's literary scene, she published her second and last book, Discuss Disgust. The novella, literarily more sophisticated but never as popular as her first book, portrays the world as seen through the eyes of a child whose mother is a prostitute. In it, Hicks continued to openly discuss sexuality, and in veiled terms broached the taboo of sexual abuse, both subjects that were not normally openly spoken of in Singapore during the time. Adding fuel to the controversy surrounding Hicks, a widely read local traditionalist columnist dubbed Discuss Disgust as "another one of those commercial publications which pack sleaze and sin into its hundred-oddpages" (sic). While an understanding of Discuss Disgust was much greater than was let on among even traditionalists critics, social pressures meant that few people openly accepted the novella for what it actually was: Hicks' semi-autobiographical account of her own troubled childhood years, an only partially veiled yet immediately unsuccessful cry for the public to reinterpret her early adult years through the psychological trauma of her childhood years.

=== "The Bonny Hicks Diary" ===
Hicks was also a frequent contributor to Singaporean and regional press outlets. Her frankly-written bi-monthly column in The Straits Times, "The Bonny Hicks Diary", in which she often discussed her childhood on Sentosa Island, further incited traditionalists' feelings that Hicks was an improper role model for young, impressionable girls, whom traditionalists felt were being morally corrupted by Hicks. Yielding to public traditionalist pressure, spurred initially by a letter writing campaign to the paper, the Times pulled her column within a year. The paper's esteemed editor, Richard Lim, subsequently voiced regret over what he considered a politically motivated decision by the paper. Pushing back as far as practicable, Lim began running frequent "special" columns by Hicks. Having taken a mentoring interest in Hicks' development as a writer since her first publication, Lim was uniquely authoritative when he publicly noted the deepening of Hicks' writings as she matured.

=== Third Book? ===
At the time of Discuss Disgust's release, Hicks reported to The Straits Times that she had been working on a third book, one that centred on correspondence between herself and an unnamed female housemate. Hicks wrote of her social observations of the United States during a two-month visit, using it as a springboard to make social commentary about Singapore. While the book idea further revealed Hicks' preference to write with a certain person in mind it never materialised, not even in draft form or as personal papers released posthumously.

== Life transition ==
=== Introspection ===
During Hicks' heyday, few had begun to adequately situate her life and works within the larger societal changes that had enveloped Singapore at the time under forces of rapid globalisation—changes that, by then, were simply far too advanced and powerful to altogether stop the clock upon by the traditionally successful means of shaming and ostracising. For the most part, traditionalists simply reacted from gut-level fear against Hicks, or a simplified characterisation or straw man of her, whom they perceived as a "notorious" moral threat willing to degrade Singaporean society for personal fame and financial gain. Even though the criticisms were not entirely fair—they certainly contained at least a kernel of truth—their accumulation had long been taking a toll upon Hicks' perseverance, eroding away at even her senses of identity, purpose, and wholeness, and thus her basic senses of faith, hope, and peace about the future. While she yet continued to milk opportunities for self-promotion, as Pat Chan had early on taught her to do, it was becoming clearer and clearer that Hicks had for some time been deep within a season of personal introspection, and had been laying plans for a significant life and career transition that appeared to be informed by the values of Singaporean traditionalists. Whilst she was perhaps conceding a victory to her traditionalist critics amid her life transition, her life change was caused at least as much by her own personal maturing away from the years and seemingly unrestrained values of her youth, although there was certainly an interplay of both external and internal forces that prodded her along.

Overall, Hicks's self-promotional success efforts had begun to painfully wane; so, she took pause and introspectively re-evaluated her life. Of this tumultuous period Hicks confessed,

I experienced great happiness and great sorrow in my life. While the great happiness was uplifting and renewing, the sorrow ate at me slowly, like a worm in the core of an apple. I realised then that stable happiness was not mine until I could eliminate the sorrow too. The sorrow which I experienced was often due to the fact that my own happiness came at a price. That price was someone else's happiness.

=== New mentors, new growth ===
Despite Hicks' confession that she had harmed others along her path to fame, and her intention to reverse the trend, she all along had her supporters—those who comprehended her on a level deeper than the mere fandom she had so often sought to instigate toward herself, and who saw in Hicks a young lady not trying to offend but to initiate critical conversations within a culture that was often far too resistant to anything beyond the familiar. To them, Hicks' anthropical philosophy of life that featured loving, caring and sharing was not only refreshing but important, perhaps more than even Hicks herself could appreciate at the time. A growing voice appeared to emerge clearly in her writings, and it attracted many Singaporeans and others, including some scholars. Two of the scholars would become pivotally influential new mentors to Hicks during her major traditionalist life transition, the ultimate result of which, as things would turn out, would be cut short by her untimely death.

One of Hicks' new mentors was Tal Ben-Shahar, a positive psychologist and popular professor of psychology at the time at Harvard University. Hicks reached out to Ben-Shahar after being exposed to his writings, and the two corresponded about philosophical and spiritual matters for approximately one year, on up until Hicks' 1997 death. The correspondence later became basis for a 1998 book by Ben-Shahar, in which he narrated Hicks' profound growth during the year.

Hicks had also become a student of Confucian humanism, and she was particularly attracted to the thought of a second Harvard professor, Tu Wei-Ming, a New Confucian philosopher, who became a second new mentor to Hicks. Hicks attended Tu's seminars and the two corresponded over some months. With Tu's influence added to that of Ben-Shahar's, Hicks began to exhibit an increased New Confucian influence upon her thinking, and she soon turned in her occasional Straits Times columns to criticising Singaporean society from the theme. In one piece, she expressed dismay about the "lack of understanding of Confucianism as it was intended to be and the political version of the ideology to which we [as Singaporeans] are exposed today." Just before Hicks' death she had submitted what Editor Richard Lim recognised as her most mature column ever to The Straits Times. The daily posthumously published "I think and feel, therefore I am", on 28 December 1997. In it Hicks argued,

Thinking is more than just conceiving ideas and drawing inferences; thinking is also reflection and contemplation. When we take embodied thinking rather than abstract reasoning as a goal for our mind, then we understand that thinking is a transformative act.

The mind will not only deduce, speculate, and comprehend, but it will also awaken, will enlighten and inspire.

Si, is how I have thought, and always will think.

Tu asserts that Hicks' use of the Chinese character Si was "code language," readily understood by her Chinese-speaking English readers, to convey New Confucian thought. The piece, Hicks' last, reflects the maturing and deepening engagement in philosophy and spirituality that she had clearly been enveloped in under tutelage of her new mentors during her last year of life.

== Redefining herself ==
=== Move to Indonesia ===
When Hicks penned Excuse Me, are you a Model?, her intent was to write a first book to which people would react. Whether those reactions were positive or negative was not her young mind's first concern. Only public indifference, the antithesis of public reaction, would impede her achievement of fame and popularity, she believed—a message Pat Chan had surely instilled in Hicks from the start. Hicks described her own early motivations:

I wanted to be something all young girls aspired to be, I wanted to be that model that men lusted after, I wanted to be that model that people would recognise on the streets. I wanted to be that model that clients would never stop demanding for, I wanted to be that model, that face, that would launch a thousand ships. I wanted to be a star.

Although Hicks never fully attained her stardom goals, and although she later distanced herself from her goals on the matter, Singaporeans broadly took note of the nature of her early attempts at becoming famous. Few people found themselves able to respond to Hicks with a mere shrug, a fact that fueled not only her popularity among her supporters but the controversy that so doggedly followed her among her critics. While tasting the intense and transitory flavor of fame, Hicks' limited life experience could not have led her to anticipate the intensity of the negative reactions that would accompany her attempts under the spotlight, could not have allowed her to surmise the toll that the negative words and societal shunning would take upon her psyche over time. In many ways, her move to Indonesia, which coincided with her plea for greater public understanding as released in her second book, Discuss Disgust, was an attempt to escape the intense controversy she had experienced in Singapore over her first book, Excuse Me, Are You a Model? Whether her departure was something of a victory for traditionalists, a mere admission to herself of her limited constitution to withstand societal disapprobation, an outcome of simply her own maturation, or some combination of the three, cannot be known with certainty. What is clear, however, is that her hope through her move was to find a reprieve from the societal shunning she had been experiencing from traditionalists in Singapore; to move to a place where she could deepen and further redefine herself and perhaps undertake a larger and much wiser relaunching of herself in Singapore. Due to her untimely death, it was never to be.

=== Heading to university ===
Part of Hicks' plan was to attend university. Although Hicks publicly downplayed her lack of higher education, she privately expressed regret that she had not studied past her A-levels, a fact traditionalist critics had used against her and her writings with no small frequency. During the year leading up to her 1997 death, Hicks applied to numerous universities in Britain and the United States, including Harvard. During her application processes Hicks called upon her Harvard mentors to exert influence on her behalf, which certainly helped overcome any negative effects that remained from Hicks' unremarkable academic record during her youth. At the time she applied, Hicks could present herself as an exceptional candidate to any university she wished to attend, a veritable shoo-in. Here was a young woman who had overcome a very difficult upbringing to become a nationally known model-turned-author, and whose mind, spirit, and insights had authentically impressed the two high-level academicians who had become the predominant mentors of her life transition and letter of recommendation writers. Hicks soon reported through the Singaporean press that she had received one university acceptance, refusing to say where, stating that she was awaiting other possible acceptances before ultimately deciding where to attend.

=== Marriage and family plans ===
In keeping with traditionalist Singaporean pressures placed upon her, Hicks had begun to mature her image regarding her personal relationships and sexual reputation, even though her actual deeds may not have fully deserved ill repute. She made plans to marry, settle down, and have children. Shortly before her death, Hicks became engaged to her longtime boyfriend, Richard "Randy" Dalrymple, an American architect of some regional prominence because of his unique structures in Singapore and Jakarta, some featured in Architectural Digest. It was to celebrate Christmas with Dalrymple's family that Hicks and Dalrymple boarded SilkAir Flight 185 in Jakarta en route to Singapore, probably their first such visit to the home of Dalrymple's parents as an engaged couple. The young couple never arrived, died en route, as their flight crashed into the Musi River.

== Death ==
Less than thirty minutes into SilkAir Flight 185 with Hicks aboard, the flight began a high-speed nosedive at 35,000 feet toward the Musi River in Southern Sumatra, Indonesia. While mid-air, the plane broke into pieces before being scattered across the river's surface. Local fisherman searched the crash site for survivors with scant hope. Both Hicks and Dalrymple died with all of the rest of the passengers and crew.

Later, divers confirmed Hicks' death at the crash site after recovering some of her personal effects, including her wallet and credit cards.

=== Aftermath ===
Hicks' death just before her 30th birthday shocked Singaporeans, as well as others around the globe, and prompted a swirl of activity as people sought to interpret the meaning of a life that had been suddenly cut short. Hicks' traditionalist critics as well as her allies both looked afresh, deeper, more carefully, and perhaps with a level of nuance she had prior deserved all along.

== Legacy ==
=== Post-modern author ===
Hicks is a transitional yet often still-controversial figure who lived and died a tragic death amid an important period of debate over changes between traditional and globalised Singapore. Both in life and in death, her status as a writer came to eclipse her status as a model. Today she is most recognised for her contributions to Singaporean post-colonial literature that spoke out on subjects not normally broached in her society, and the anthropic philosophy contained in her writings. Describing the consensus of Singaporean literary scholars in 1995, two years before Hicks' death, Ismail S. Talib in The Journal of Commonwealth Literature stated of Excuse me, are you a Model?: "We have come to realize in retrospect that Hicks's autobiographical account of her life as a model was a significant milestone in Singapore's literary and cultural history". This recognition preceded Hicks' death, and in light of the controversy, and even the societal shunning she faced because of her early writings, took her and many around her by surprise. It also helped fuel the life transition she underwent prior her death.

=== Interpreting a life cut short ===
As answers and unanswered questions continued to trickle out from the flight investigations, literary scholars, both in Singapore and elsewhere, began their own investigations of Hicks' writings. Some did so anew, while others did so for the first time.

Tu Weiming characterized Hicks' life and philosophy as providing a "sharp contrast to Hobbes' cynic[al] view of human existence", and stated that Hicks was "the paradigmatic example of an autonomous, free-choosing individual who decided early on to construct a lifestyle congenial to her idiosyncratic sense of self-expression". More than anything, Tu said, "She was primarily a seeker of meaningful existence, a learner".

Singaporean post-colonial author Grace Chia interpreted Hicks' life with a poem, "Mermaid Princess", that parodies the traditional Scottish folk song, "My Bonnie Lies over the Ocean." An excerpt of the poem characterises Hicks as one who:

spoke too soon
too loud
too much out of turn
too brutally honest
too empowered by your sense/x/uality
too much of I, I, I, I –
I think
I know
I understand
I love
I, I, I, I.

Richard Lim, the editor of The Straits Times, interpreted Hicks in a eulogy by recalling her life and contributions to the paper, and by publishing an excerpt of the famous essay "Whistling of Birds" by D. H. Lawrence. Lim began his piece with a line from the famous folk/rock song Fire and Rain by James Taylor. "Sweet dreams and flying machines, in pieces on the ground," as if sung into his readers' memories in Taylor's melancholic tone, seemed to perfectly encapsulate much of the retrospective feeling across Singapore about Hicks' life and sudden death.

==== "Heaven can wait, but I cannot" ====
On the first anniversary of her death, in December 1998, Tal Ben-Shahar published Heaven Can Wait: Conversations with Bonny Hicks, in which he wove together his and Hicks' year-long correspondence with his own philosophical musings. The book is an extended postmodern "conversation" between two seekers journeying intensely together in a quest for meaning and purpose. It takes its title from an article Hicks submitted to The Straits Times just days before her death, which ever after took on a hauntingly prophetic air. In it she wrote: "The brevity of life on earth cannot be overemphasized. I cannot take for granted that time is on my side—because it is not ... Heaven can wait, but I cannot". In an earlier Straits Times piece that memorialised her grandmother, Hicks confessed that she believed in life after death.

=== Non-racialism ===
Especially among Singaporean youth, who in the years since Hicks' death have become increasingly uncomfortable with their country's traditional backdrops of racialism, Hicks is recognized as a person who learned to cross cultural boundaries. She lived as person who found a comfortable niche in the betwixt-and-between of contesting cultural traditions and as one who was race-blind, seeing people for who they really were.

== Bibliography ==
- 'Excuse Me, are you a Model?' (1990, Flame of the Forest) ISBN 981-00-2051-1
- 剪一段深深的曾经 : 名模的流金岁月 (1991, Flame of the Forest) ISBN 981-00-3121-1
- Discuss Disgust (1992, Flame of the Forest) ISBN 978-981-00-3506-8

== Attribution ==
This article is derived from the Citizendium article "Bonny Hicks" by Stephen Ewen, which is licensed under the Creative Commons Attribution-Share Alike 3.0 Unported license. Attribution to the author on the face of the article is required, per the author. This requirement is fully adhered to by simply leaving up this notice.
