= Block 185 =

High-rise office building in Austin, Texas, US

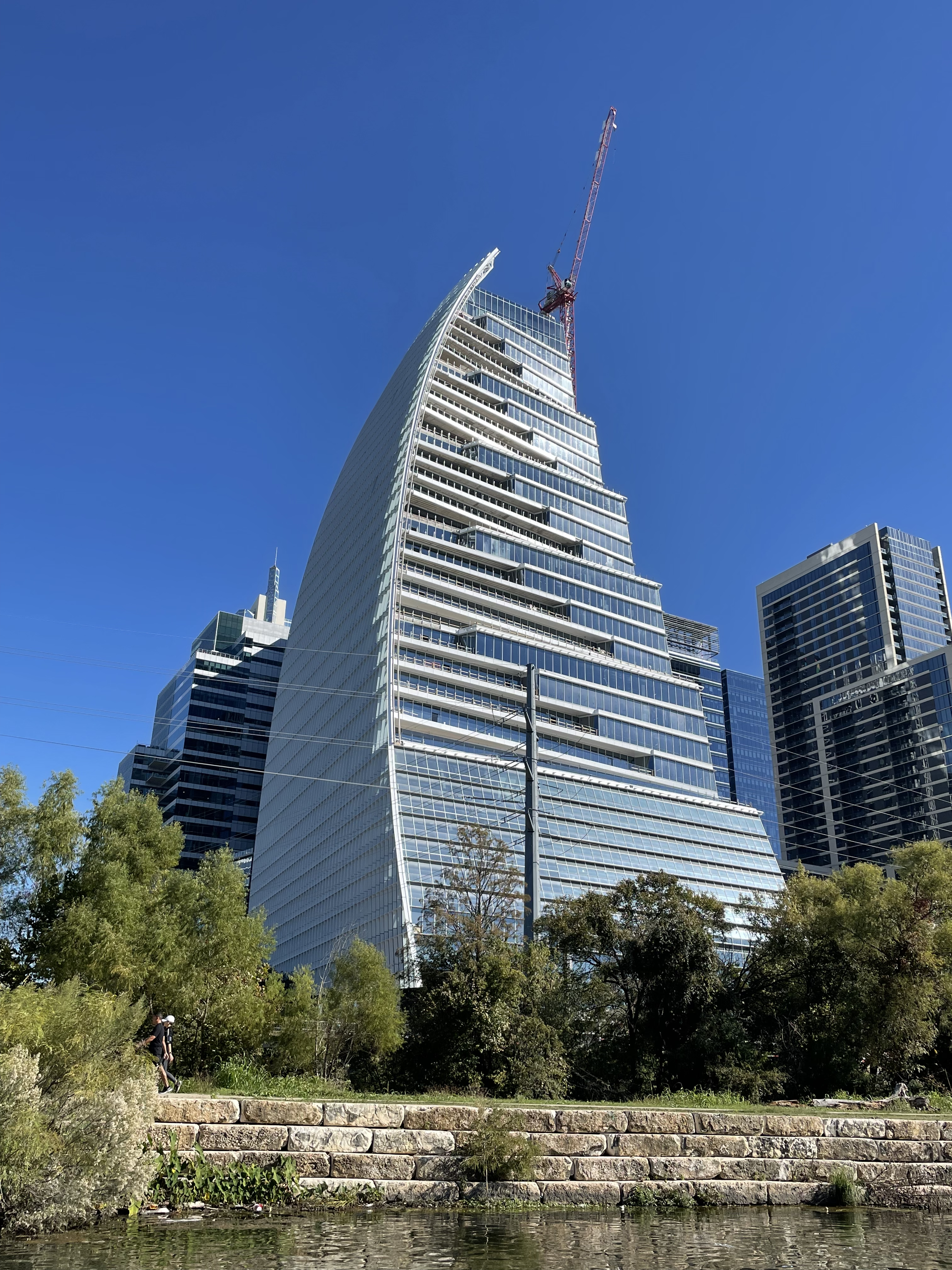
- Block 185 viewed from Lady Bird Lake
- Interactive map of the Block 185 area
- Alternative names: 601 W. 2nd St.

General information
- Type: Office
- Location: 601 W. 2nd St., Austin
- Coordinates: 30.2656°N 97.7504°W
- Groundbreaking: January 16, 2019
- Estimated completion: Q2 2022

Height
- Height: 594 ft (181 m)

Technical details
- Floor count: 35
- Floor area: 719,470 sq. ft.

Design and construction
- Architect: Pelli Clarke Pelli Architects
- Architecture firm: STG Design
- Developer: Trammell Crow

Block 185, also known as Sail Tower, is an office skyscraper located at 601 W. 2nd St. in Downtown Austin, Texas. The tower topped out in July 2021. The tower is the fourth tallest in Austin at 594 feet, and the tallest office tower in Texas outside of Houston or Dallas. Block 185 is bound to the west by Shoal Creek, to the east by Nueces Street, to the north by Second Street and to the south by Cesar Chavez Street. The tower is located on the final parcel of the former Green Water Treatment Plant and in Austin's Second Street District.

== History ==
In the 1839 plan of Austin the property, along with three other adjoining properties, was designated for use as a penitentiary, however, a map of Austin from 1840 shows that lot split out into four tracks—Block 185, 186, 187 and 188. Eventually, the 1.26 acre plot of land would become the Green Water Treatment Plant and, in 2012, it was purchased by a partnership between Trammel Crow and MSD Capital for $10,277,470. After many years of planning and many design changes, both increasing and decreasing in height, Block 185 started construction on January 16, 2019. Even after the groundbreaking, the tenants of the tower had not yet been announced and no renderings had been made public.

On January 31, 2019, while it was still under construction, Brandywine announced that Google would lease the entire building. The lease expires in 2038, however, amid the COVID-19 recession, Google delayed moving employees into the building, even after its 2022 completion, and the building remained empty until late 2025.

The same day as Brandywine's announcement of Google's lease, the Austin American-Statesman released the first renderings.

In December 2024 Cousins Properties announced that they would be acquiring Block 185 for $521.8 million, the largest purchase of an office property in Austin in 2024.

== Architecture ==
The building's unique design is due, in part, to setback requirements owing to its proximity to Shoal Creek and Lady Bird Lake. On the south side fronting Lady Bird Lake, this setback manifests itself as a series of receding terraces. On the west side, facing Shoal Creek, the tower's curtain-wall glass façade curves away from the creek, giving the building a sailboat-like appearance. The tower has been called "the single most impressive skyscraper design we’ve seen in the city since the debut of the Frost Bank Tower".
