= SilkAir 185: Pilot Suicide? =

2006 documentary film

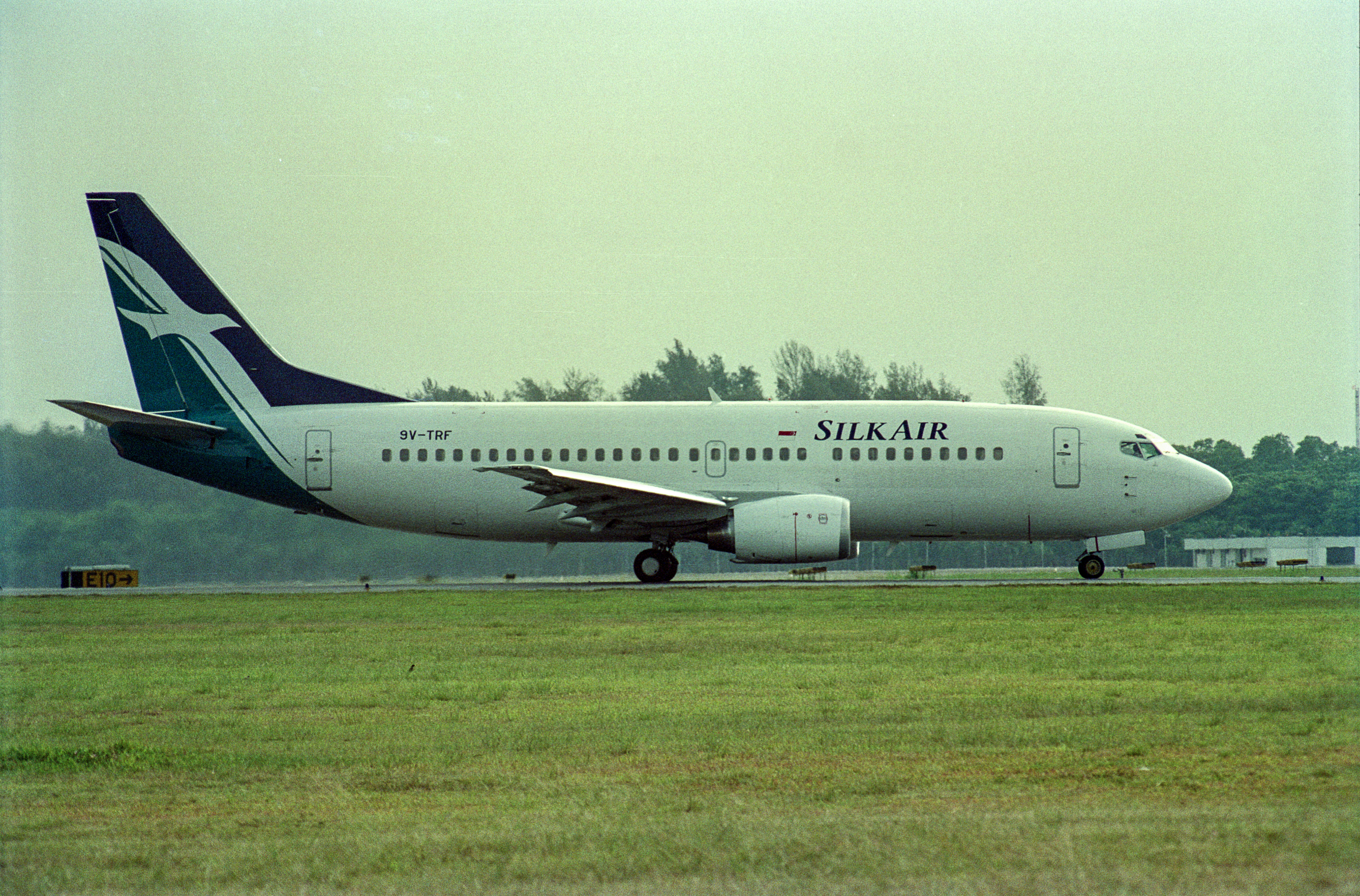
9V-TRF, the aircraft involved

SilkAir 185: Pilot Suicide? is a 2006 documentary film by Asia Pacific Vision (APV). Its subject is the crash of SilkAir Flight 185.

The 60-minute documentary features interviews with air crash investigators who were involved in the case, relatives of those who were killed in the disaster, and lawyers who brought suit on behalf of the victims' families as well. The documentary features recreations of the events leading up to the crash, and computer simulations of the crash itself.

SilkAir 185: Pilot Suicide? was commissioned by the National Geographic Channel Asia and the Singapore Economic Development Board Documentary Commissioning fund. The documentary, written and produced by APV's Creative Director Mike Barrett, received a "Highly Commended" award in the category "Best Documentary Programme (31 minutes or more)" at the 2006 Asian Television Awards.

== Incident ==
SilkAir Flight 185 was a scheduled international passenger flight operated by a Boeing 737-300 from Soekarno–Hatta International Airport in Jakarta, Indonesia to Changi Airport in Singapore that crashed into the Musi River near Palembang, Sumatra, on 19 December 1997, killing all 97 passengers and 7 crew members on board.
