= SilkAir Flight 185 =

1997 aircraft crash in Indonesia

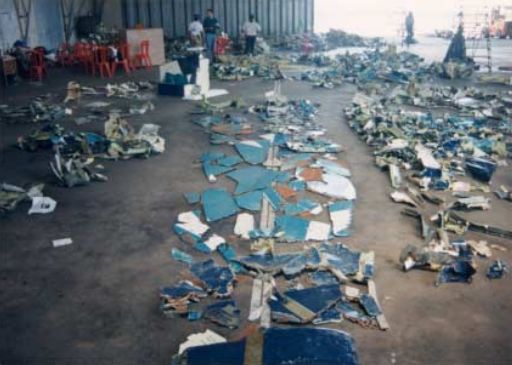
- Aircraft debris recovered from the Musi River

Occurrence
- Date: 19 December 1997
- Summary: Crashed into the Musi River from cruise altitude, in-flight breakup; cause disputed
- Site: Musi River, Palembang, Indonesia; 2°27′30″S 104°56′12″E

Aircraft
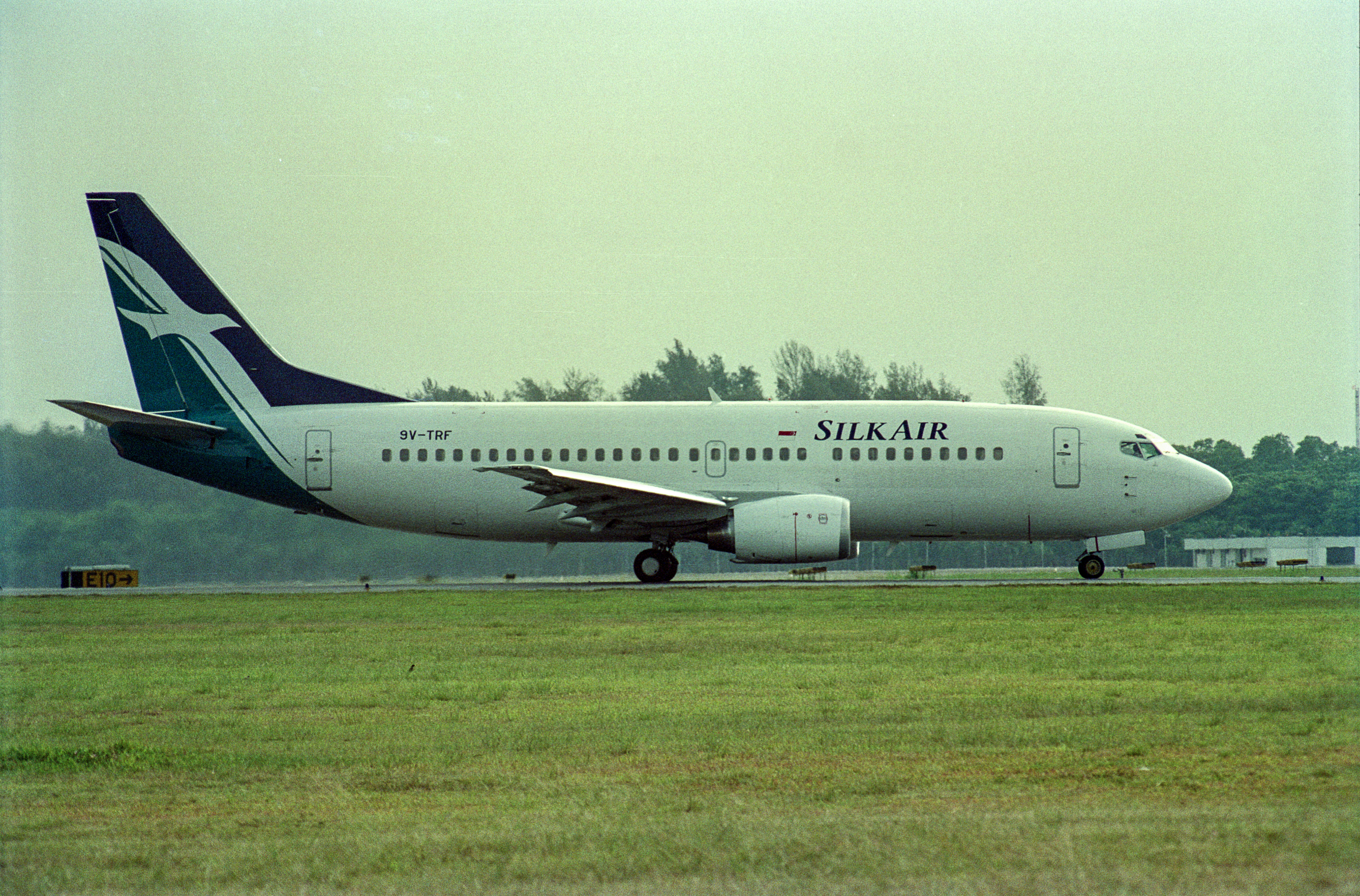
- 9V-TRF, the aircraft involved, seen in May 1997
- Aircraft type: Boeing 737-36N
- Operator: SilkAir
- IATA flight No.: MI185
- ICAO flight No.: SLK185
- Call sign: SILK AIR 185
- Registration: 9V-TRF
- Flight origin: Soekarno–Hatta Int'l Airport, Jakarta, Indonesia
- Destination: Singapore Changi Airport, Singapore
- Occupants: 104
- Passengers: 97
- Crew: 7
- Fatalities: 104
- Survivors: 0

SilkAir Flight 185 was a scheduled international passenger flight operated by a Boeing 737-300 from Soekarno–Hatta International Airport in Jakarta, Indonesia to Changi Airport in Singapore that crashed into the Musi River near Palembang, Sumatra, on 19 December 1997, killing all 97 passengers and 7 crew members on board.

The investigation into the cause of the crash was led by investigators from the National Transportation Safety Committee (NTSC), who were joined by the National Transportation Safety Board (NTSB). The NTSB, which participated in the investigation due to Boeing's manufacture of the aircraft in the US, investigated the crash under lead investigator Greg Feith.

The cause of the crash remains disputed and contentious. In its final report, the NTSC stated that there was "no concrete evidence" to support the pilot suicide hypothesis, while the manufacturer had already determined the suspected Parker-Hannifin hydraulic power control unit (PCU) to be defect-free. Ultimately, the NTSC concluded that the evidence was insufficient to determine a cause. Conversely, the NTSB submitted a letter concluding that the crash was the result of deliberate flight-control inputs, which were "most likely by the captain".

== Background ==
=== Aircraft ===
The aircraft involved was a Boeing 737-36N with serial number 28556, registered as 9V-TRF, and powered by two CFM56-3B2 engines. Having completed its maiden flight on 27 January 1997, the aircraft was delivered to SilkAir on 14 February, 10 months before the crash. At the time of the accident, it was the newest aircraft in SilkAir's fleet, and had accumulated more than 2,200 flight hours in 1,300 cycles. This was the first and only fatal hull loss for SilkAir in the airline's history.

=== Passengers and crew ===
SilkAir issued a press release on 19 December 1997 with a passenger count by nationality, and another the following day with crew details and a complete passenger manifest.

Victims' nationalities
Nationality	Passengers	Crew	Total
Singapore	40	6	46
Indonesia	23	-	23
Malaysia	10	-	10
United States	5	-	5
France	5	-	5
Germany	4	-	4
United Kingdom	3	-	3
Japan	2	-	2
Bosnia and Herzegovina	1	-	1
Austria	1	-	1
India	1	-	1
Taiwan (Republic of China)	1	-	1
Australia	1	-	1
New Zealand	-	1	1
Total	97	7	104

Among those killed in the crash was Singaporean model and author Bonny Hicks.

== Flight ==
Carrying 97 passengers and a crew of seven, the Boeing 737 departed Jakarta's Soekarno–Hatta International Airport's runway 25R at 15:37 local time (08:37 UTC) for an 80-minute flight to Singapore's Changi Airport. At the controls were Captain Tsu Way Ming (41) (Note: simplified Chinese: 朱卫民; traditional Chinese: 朱衛民; pinyin: Zhū Wèimín; Pe̍h-ūe-jī: Tsu Uẽ-mîng) of Singapore, a former A-4 Skyhawk pilot, and First Officer Duncan Ward (23) of New Zealand. (Note: Captain Tsu had logged a total of 7,173 flight hours, including 3,614 hours on the Boeing 737. First officer Ward had 2,501 flight hours, with 2,311 of them on the Boeing 737.) Generally fair weather was expected for the route, except for some thunderstorms near Singkep Island, 120 km (75 mi; 65 nmi) south of Singapore.

The aircraft was cleared to climb to flight level 350, about 35,000 ft (11,000 m), and to head directly to Palembang. At 15:47:06, while climbing through 24,500 feet (7,500 m), the crew requested clearance to proceed directly to waypoint PARDI (0°34′S 104°13′E). (Note: ATC reporting point north of Palembang.) At 15:53, the crew reported reaching the cruise altitude of FL350 and was cleared to proceed directly to PARDI, and to report abeam Palembang. The cockpit voice recorder (CVR) ceased recording at 16:05. At 16:10, air traffic controllers informed the flight that it was abeam Palembang, and instructed the aircraft to maintain FL350 and to contact Singapore Control upon reaching PARDI. First Officer Ward acknowledged this call. At 16:11, nearly 6 minutes after the CVR ceased recording, the flight data recorder (FDR) also stopped recording.

Flight 185 remained level at FL350 until it started a rapid and nearly vertical dive around 16:12. While descending through 12,000 ft (3,700 m), parts of the aircraft, including a great extent of the tail section, started to separate from the aircraft's fuselage due to high forces arising from the nearly supersonic dive. About 1 minute later, the aircraft hit the Musi River, near Palembang, Sumatra, killing all 104 people on board. The time it took the aircraft to dive from cruise altitude into the river was less than one minute. The plane was travelling faster than the speed of sound for a few seconds before impact. Parts of the wreckage were embedded 5 m (15 ft) into the riverbed.

The aircraft broke into pieces before impact, with the debris spread over a wide area, though most of the wreckage was concentrated in a single 60-by-80-metre (200 by 260 ft) area at the river bottom. No complete body, body part, or limb was found, as the entire aircraft and occupants disintegrated upon impact. Only six positive identifications were later obtained from the few recovered human remains.

== Investigation and final report ==
The accident was investigated by the Indonesian NTSC, which was assisted by expert groups from the US, Singapore, and Australia.

Around 73% of the wreckage (by weight) was recovered, partially reconstructed, and examined. Both of the aircraft recorders, the CVR and the FDR, were retrieved from the river and their data were extracted and analyzed.

The investigators tested 20 different simulations for various equipment-failure scenarios, and found that the only scenario that matched the actual radar trajectory of the descent and crash of the flight was a high-speed steep dive commanded by one of the pilots. Furthermore, the investigators had found the trim jackscrew for the horizontal stabilizer, which revealed that flight inputs from one of the pilots had moved the stabilizer from level flight to a full nose-down descent.

First Officer Duncan Ward was initially speculated to have deliberately crashed the aircraft, as he was the only person in the cockpit when the CVR stopped recording, but this was quickly ruled out, as Ward's friends, family, and co-workers said that he had not displayed any signs of depression nor suicidality during his career at SilkAir, and was in a good mood on the morning of the accident flight.

At 16:05, the CVR recorded Captain Tsu stating that he was leaving the cockpit to fetch water, followed by a series of metallic snaps (presumed to be the sounds of the captain's seatbelt being unfastened and the chair moving). 13.6 seconds later, the CVR ceased recording. Tests indicated that a click would be audible on the CVR recording if the CVR circuit breaker had tripped normally, but not if it had been manually removed. As there was no click, it is likely that Captain Tsu pulled out the CVR circuit breaker while exiting the cockpit. At 16:11, the FDR stopped recording. The NTSC and NTSB investigators believed that if Captain Tsu was responsible for the crash, he must have devised some excuse to persuade the first officer to leave the flight deck before disabling the FDR (which would have immediately triggered a Master Caution on both pilots' control panels), so that his actions would go unnoticed. At 16:12, as recorded by Indonesian ground radar, the aircraft entered a rapid descent, disintegrated, and crashed into the Musi River.

On 14 December 2000, after three years of investigation, the Indonesian NTSC issued its final report. The NTSC chairman, Oetarjo Diran, overrode the findings of his investigators—that the crash was caused deliberately by pilot input—so that the report stated that the evidence was inconclusive, and that the cause of the accident could not be determined. (Note: The television series Air Crash Investigation, episode "Pushed to the Limit", stated about 3 minutes before the end.)

The American NTSB, which also participated in the investigation, concluded that the evidence was consistent with a deliberate manipulation of the flight controls, most likely by the captain.

In a letter to the NTSC dated 11 December 2000, the NTSB wrote:

The examination of all of the factual evidence is consistent with the conclusions that:
1) no airplane-related mechanical malfunctions or failures caused or contributed to the accident, and
2) the accident can be explained by intentional pilot action. Specifically,
a) the accident airplane's flight profile is consistent with sustained manual nose-down flight control inputs;
b) the evidence suggests that the cockpit voice recorder (CVR) was intentionally disconnected;
c) recovery of the airplane was possible but not attempted; and
d) it is more likely that the nose-down flight control inputs were made by the captain than by the first officer.

Geoffrey Thomas of The Sydney Morning Herald said, "a secret report confirmed that the Indonesian authorities would not issue a public verdict because they feared it would make their own people too frightened to fly." Santoso Sayogo, an NTSC investigator who worked on the SilkAir 185 case, said that the Indonesian investigators submitted a report which was similar to that of the NTSB's conclusion, but were overruled by their boss.

=== Potential motives ===
In the aftermath of the crash, several potential motives for the captain's alleged suicide and homicide were suggested, including: recent financial losses of $1.2 million (his share-trading showed trading of more than one million shares and his securities-trading privileges had been suspended 10 days before the accident due to nonpayment); his obtaining a $600,000 life insurance policy the previous week, which was to have gone into effect on the day of the accident (though it later emerged that this was a routine policy taken out as part of a mortgage requirement); his receipt of several recent disciplinary actions on the part of the airline (including one that related to improper manipulation of the CVR circuit breaker); and the loss of four squadron mates during his military flight training, 18 years earlier on the exact date of the crash. He had also had several conflicts with Ward and other co-pilots who had questioned his command suitability. Investigations later revealed that his total assets were greater than his liabilities, although his liquid assets could not cover his immediate debts; his monthly income was less than his family's monthly expenditure, and he had some outstanding credit card debts.

An official investigation by the Singapore Police Force into evidence of criminal offence leading to the crash found "no evidence that the pilot, copilot, or any crew member had suicidal tendencies or a motive to deliberately cause the crash of [the aircraft]".

Tsu was formerly a Republic of Singapore Air Force pilot, and had over 20 years of flying experience in the older T/A-4S Skyhawks, as well as the newer T/A-4SU Super Skyhawks. His last appointment was instructor pilot of a Skyhawk squadron.

=== CVR and FDR deactivation ===
The CVR and FDR stopped recording minutes before the abrupt descent, but not at the same time. The CVR stopped functioning about 6 minutes before the dive as the captain was leaving the cockpit for a short break. The FDR was deactivated 5 minutes later around 1 minute before the dive. Overload and short-circuit tests show that a distinctive 400-Hz tone is recorded by the CVR when the CVR circuit breaker trips. The investigators could not find this sound on Flight 185's CVR, which made them conclude that the CVR circuit breaker was manually pulled out. The radio continued to work after the failure of the CVR, which indicates that power failure was not the cause. Testing of the unit by the NTSC found no evidence that a malfunction or failure caused either recorder to stop recording data.

=== Servo valve issue ===
Starting in 1991, several accidents and incidents involving the Boeing 737 happened as the result of uncommanded movement of their rudders. On 3 March 1991, United Airlines Flight 585, a 737-200, crashed in Colorado Springs, Colorado, killing 25 people. On 8 September 1994, USAir Flight 427, a 737-300, crashed near Pittsburgh, Pennsylvania, killing 132 people. Four more incidents occurred where a 737 rudder PCU malfunction was suspected.

The Seattle Times devoted a series of 37 articles to Boeing 737 loss-of-control malfunctions. The accident occurred in the middle of a controversy over the NTSB's role in accidents caused by the rudder control unit.

During the investigation of Flight 427, the NTSB had discovered that the PCU's dual servo valve could jam as well, and deflect the rudder in the opposite direction of the pilots' input, due to thermal shock, caused when cold PCUs are injected with hot hydraulic fluid. As a result of this finding, the FAA ordered the servo valves to be replaced, and new training protocol for pilots to handle unexpected movement of flight controls to be developed. The FAA ordered an upgrade of all Boeing 737 rudder control systems by 12 November 2002.

== Aftermath ==
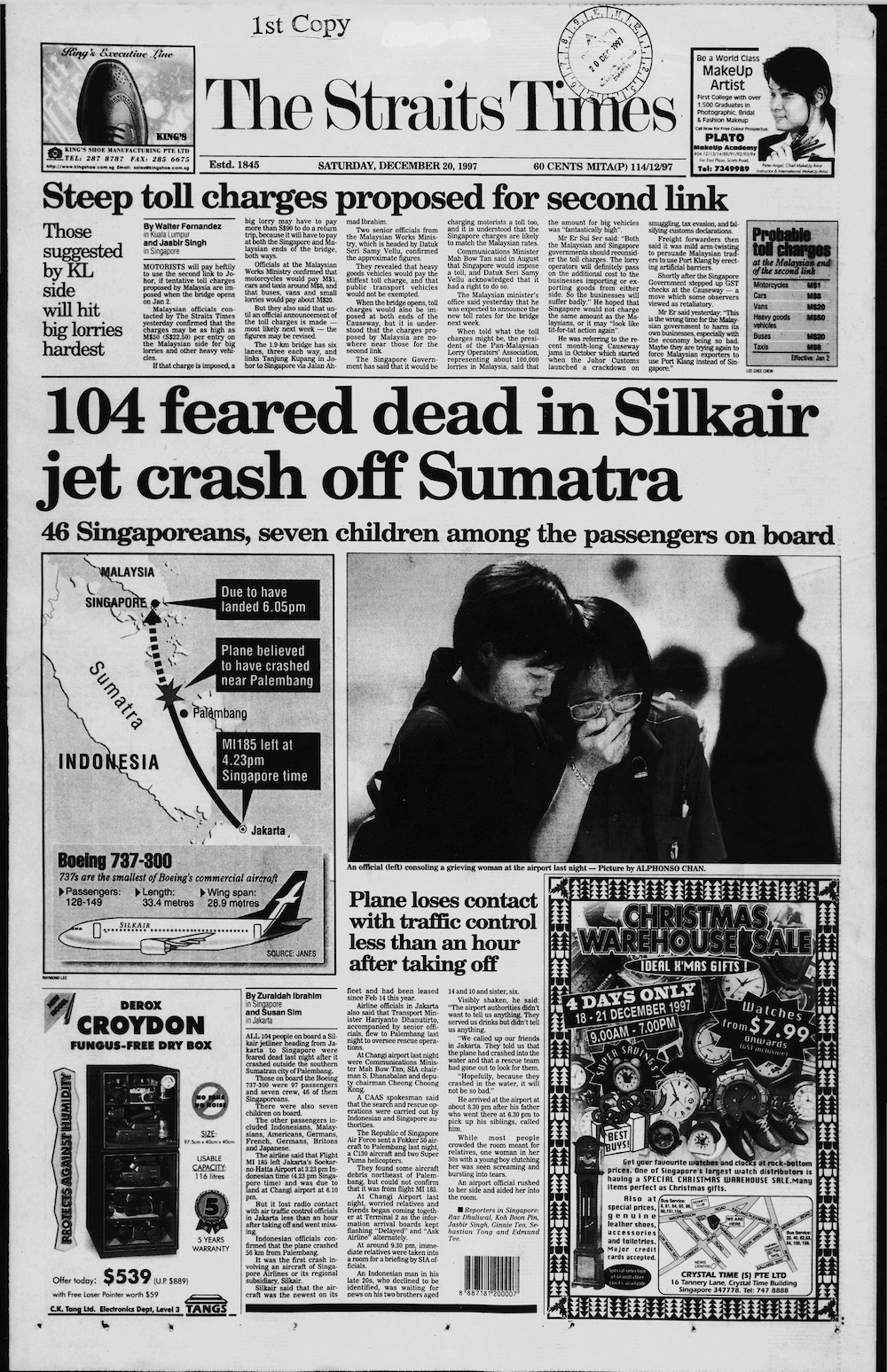
"104 feared dead in Silkair jet crash off Sumatra." The headline on page 1 of The Straits Times the day after the crash

=== Lawsuits ===
SilkAir paid USD$10,000 compensation to each victim's family, the maximum under the Warsaw Convention. Boeing also paid an undisclosed amount of compensation. In July 2001, six families began court proceedings against SilkAir for damages, based on the allegation that the crash was caused by the pilot, after each had rejected a compensation offer of $200,000 (£143,000). In October 2001, the claims were turned down by a Singapore High Court judge, who ruled that "the onus of proving that flight MI185 was intentionally crashed has not been discharged."

The NTSB and PCU manufacturer, Parker-Hannifin, had already determined that the PCU was properly working, and thus the cause of the crash was not due to a PCU malfunction or any mechanical failure. Regardless, a private and independent investigation into the crash refocused on and further examined the recovered PCU device that had been the culprit in two other Boeing 737 crashes. The findings of the private investigation were then taken to the Los Angeles Superior Court in 2004, where the jury, which was not allowed to hear or consider the NTSB's conclusions about the accident, found that the crash was caused by a defective servo valve in the plane's rudder. Parker-Hannifin was ordered to pay three of the victims families present US$43.6 million. They later compensated all families involved after threatening to appeal the verdict, but denied any liability.

Parker-Hannifin spokesperson Lorrie Paul Crum stated that a federal law disallowed them from using the NTSB final report as evidence in the company's favor during the lawsuit. The lawyer representing the plaintiffs, Walter Lack, stated that the law only disallowed using the NTSB report's conclusion and suggestions, while statements of fact are admissible. USC §1154 (Discovery and use of cockpit and surface vehicle recordings and transcripts) states: "No part of a report of the Board, related to an accident or an investigation of an accident, may be admitted into evidence or used in a civil action for damages resulting from a matter mentioned in the report."

=== Memorials ===
A memorial for the victims was erected at the burial site, which is located within the Botanical Gardens near Palembang. Another memorial is located at Choa Chu Kang Cemetery in Singapore.

=== Dramatisation ===
The Discovery Channel Canada / National Geographic TV series Mayday (also called Air Crash Investigation or Air Disasters) dramatised the accident in a 2012 episode titled Pushed to the Limit (broadcast in some countries as Pilot Under Pressure). The episode argues Captain Tsu may have taken the opportunity of leaving the cockpit to trip the CVR circuit breaker, consequently turning off the CVR. The episode also shows that Tsu is thought to have come up with an excuse to get Ward out of the cockpit. Having done so, he then proceeded to lock Ward out of the flight deck before disabling the FDR; Tsu is presumed to have done this to ensure that no record would be made of what he was going to do next. The episode further states that the rudder issue had been corrected before construction started on the accident aircraft. Nevertheless, the theory of a rudder malfunction was investigated with the possibility of corrosion, or debris getting stuck in the PCU, and was disproved.

The accident was also featured in a 2006 National Geographic documentary titled SilkAir 185: Pilot Suicide?. The documentary claimed that the accident aircraft's FDR had failed to record 60 out of the 296 parameters for periods lasting between 10 seconds and 10 minutes in the 25 hours preceding the crash.

=== In popular culture ===
Singaporean singer JJ Lin's 2013 song "Practice Love" (Chinese: 修煉愛情) from the album Stories Untold (因你而在) is based on this incident, as a close friend of the artist, Xu Chue Fern, was killed on the flight.

== See also ==
- Aviation safety
- Boeing 737 rudder issues
- List of declared or suspected pilot suicides
- List of aircraft accidents and incidents resulting in at least 50 fatalities
- Boeing 737 Classic § Accidents and incidents
- List of accidents and incidents involving airliners by location § Indonesia
- SilkAir 185: Pilot Suicide?
- Suicide by pilot

Specific incidents involving pilot suicide

- China Eastern Airlines Flight 5735, a crash possibly involving pilot suicide
- EgyptAir Flight 990, a disputed crash involving pilot suicide
- Germanwings Flight 9525
- Japan Airlines Flight 350
- LAM Mozambique Airlines Flight 470
- Royal Air Maroc Flight 630

Specific incidents involving rudder/mechanical problems

- American Airlines Flight 1
- American Airlines Flight 587
- Eastwind Airlines Flight 517
- Indonesia AirAsia Flight 8501
- Northwest Airlines Flight 85
- United Airlines Flight 585
- USAir Flight 427
