= USS Koka (ATA-185) =

Tugboat of the United States Navy

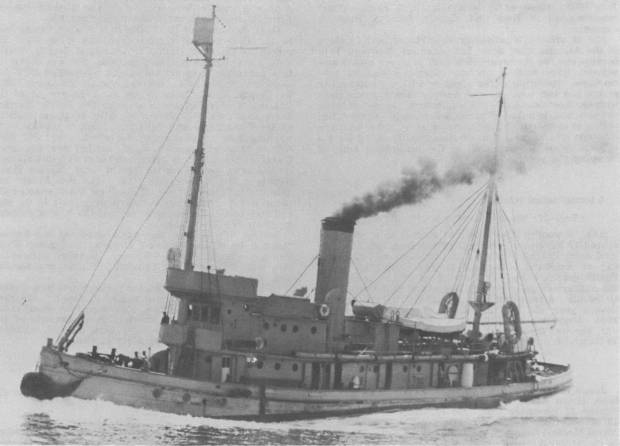
- USS Koka (ATA-185)

History

United States
- Name: USS Koka (ATA-185)
- Launched: 11 September 1944
- Commissioned: 16 November 1944
- Fate: Unknown as of 1984

General characteristics
- Class & type: ATA-174
- Displacement: 534
- Length: 143 ft (44 m)
- Beam: 34 ft (10 m)
- Draft: 13 ft (4.0 m)
- Speed: 13 kts.
- Complement: 48
- Armament: 1 3 in (76 mm); 2 20 mm

USS Koka (ATA-185) was a US Navy tugboat. Koka is from the phonetic spelling of Coca, formerly an Indian village in southern Arizona. Originally designated as ATR-112, she was redesignated as ATA-185 on 15 May 1944; launched 11 September 1944, by Levingston Shipbuilding Co., Orange, Texas; and commissioned on 16 November.

== History ==
After shakedown in the Gulf of Mexico, ATA-185 departed Galveston 14 December for duty in the Pacific. She reached Eniwetok, Marshalls, 26 February 1945; and for more than 5 months she operated out of Eniwetok; Guam and Saipan, Marianas; Ulithi, Carolines; and Kerama, Ryūkyūs, while performing a variety of towing services. After a month of target sled towing duty at Guam, ATA-185 departed 4 August for Okinawa, where she arrived 11 August with two barges in tow. As a unit of SerRon 12, she performed tug and salvage operations in Buckner Bay until 3 November when she departed for the United States. Steaming via Eniwetok and Pearl Harbor, she arrived San Francisco 1 February 1946 with YNG-30 and YNG-38 in tow.

Clearing San Francisco Bay 22 March, ATA-185 reached Pearl Harbor 13 April to prepare for participation in atomic weapons tests in the Marshall Islands. Departing Pearl 11 May, she assisted in mooring target ships for Operation Crossroads at Bikini Atoll. After the tests she recovered radiological instruments from various target ships, including Nevada (BB-36), former German cruiser Prinz Eugen, and former Japanese battleship Nagato. Departing Bikini 5 September, she reached Pearl Harbor 20 September then underwent a 4-month overhaul.

ATA-185 departed Pearl Harbor 20 January 1947, and arrived San Diego 3 February with LCI-1062 in tow. She was assigned to the 11th Naval District for coastal towing. Renamed Koka (ATA-185) on 16 July 1948, most of her towing assignments have carried her to Long Beach, Port Hueneme, San Pedro, and San Francisco. Over the years she has traveled the Pacific coast from California to Alaska while towing barges and district craft to Kodiak, Alaska; Seattle, Washington; and Portland and Astoria, Oregon. Koka continued her coastal towing out of San Diego for the 11th Naval District into 1967.

== Fate ==
Koka was decommissioned and struck from the Naval Register in 1971. She was sold for commercial service to Samoan American Tug Company in 1971. She was later sold to the Guam Marine Department and renamed Taliga.

In 1984 tug Taliga was sold for reuse as a breakwater in the Seattle area. She sunk, on an unknown date, at Crow's Nest Marina on the east side of Commencement Bay, Tacoma, Washington while being prepared for scuttling as part of a breakwater.

== Legacy ==
USS Koka's builder's plate showing Hull No. 352 Levingston Shipbuilding Co, Orange, Texas, 1944 was sold at auction in the UK for £160. It featured on the BBC programme Flog It! - Morecambe 14, Series 15, first broadcast Friday 24 February 2017.

== Awards ==
- Asiatic-Pacific Campaign Medal with one battle star
- World War II Victory Medal
- Navy Occupation Medal with "ASIA" clasp
- National Defense Service Medal with star
