= Dravo Corporation =

American shipbuilding company

Dravo Corporation was an American shipbuilding company with shipyards in Pittsburgh and Wilmington, Delaware. It was founded by Frank and Ralph Dravo in Pittsburgh in 1891. The corporation went public in 1936 and in 1998 it was bought out by Carmeuse for $192 million ($379.3 million today). On March 5, 1942, it became the first corporation to receive the Army-Navy "E" Award for outstanding war time production. Dravo ranked 72nd among United States corporations in the value of World War II military production contracts. By the 1970s, the corporation had moved into the business of building locks and dams on the Ohio River.

== Facilities ==
- Neville Island shipyard, Pittsburgh — started 1919, constructed LST's during World War II employing 16,000 people, closed 1982. (40.510°N 80.117°W)
- Wilmington Shipyard, Delaware — employed 10,500 during World War II, constructing Destroyer escorts. Now closed. Traces back to Harlan and Hollingsworth (39.730°N 75.561°W)

== Ships ==
From 1942 to 1945, Dravo Corporation built Landing Ship, Tank, (LST). LST were built to support amphibious operations able to land tanks, vehicles, cargo, and landing troops on to beaches. No docks or piers were required for these amphibious assaults. The LST had a special bow with a large door that could open. Then a ramp was installed for unloading allied vehicles. The LST had a flat keel, so it could be beached and stay upright. The propellers and rudders were protected from grounding damage. Many were used in the Pacific War and in the European theatre, especially on Battle of Normandy. In 1942 and 1943, Dravo Corporation also built Submarine chasers.

- Pittsburgh yard
  - 3 of 148 Buckley-class destroyer escorts
    - Jenks (DE-665) ... Wiseman (DE-667)
  - 16 of 343 PC-461-class submarine chasers
    - 490 - 495, 573, 592 - 595
    - 1593 - 1597 (see Adroit-class minesweeper)
  - 146 of 1052 Landing Ship Tank
    - 1 - 60 (except 6, 16, 21, 25)
    - 730 - 753, 775 - 796, 884 - 905, 1038 - 1059
- Wilmington yard
  - 15 of 72 Cannon-class destroyer escorts
    - Cannon (DE-99) ... Clarence L. Evans (DE-113)
  - 4 of 343 PC-461-class submarine chasers
    - PC-574 - PC-577
  - LST6, LST16, LST21, LST25
  - 65 of 558 Landing Ship Medium
    - LSM-201 - LSM-232, LSM-414 - LSM-446

== Other Projects ==
Dravo Corporation participated in the construction of the second span of the Chesapeake Bay Bridge in 1973.

== See also ==
- James v. Dravo Contracting Co.
- Ships built by Dravo Corporation
