= 2015 in aviation =

This is a list of aviation-related events in 2015.

== Events ==
=== January ===
7 January

- Divers and an unmanned underwater vehicle discover and photograph the tail section of Indonesia AirAsia Flight 8501 resting on the bottom of the Java Sea. It is the first discovery of a major piece of wreckage of the Airbus A320-216 since it disappeared from radar on 28 December 2014 during a flight from Surabaya, Indonesia, to Singapore.

10 January

- The first major piece of wreckage from Indonesia AirAsia Flight 8501, a piece of the Airbus A320-216's tail section, is brought to the surface from the bottom of the Java Sea.

12 January

- A volcanic eruption in Tonga sends ash into the sky, prompting the cancellation of all international flights to and from the country. Flights do not resume until 14 January.
- Divers retrieve the flight data recorder from Indonesia AirAsia Flight 8501's wreckage on the bottom of the Java Sea.

13 January

- Divers retrieve the cockpit voice recorder from Indonesia AirAsia Flight 8501's wreckage on the bottom of the Java Sea.

14 January

- A remotely operated vehicle from the Singapore Navy submarine support and rescue ship MS Swift Rescue locates and photographs the fuselage of Indonesia AirAsia Flight 8501 on the bottom of the Java Sea two kilometres (1.2 mi; 1.1 nmi) from the area where the tail section had been found.

18 January

- A Syrian Air Force Antonov An-26 crashes at Abu adh Dhuhur Air Base in Syria, killing all 30 people on board. The Government of Syria says that it crashed due to fog, but the al Nusra Front claims to have shot it down.

19 January

- Indonesia AirAsia X, an airline created as a joint venture of AirAsia X and Indonesia AirAsia to provide long-haul service from Bali's Ngurah Rai International Airport, makes its first flight, from Bali to Taipei, Taiwan.

20 January

- Olimp Air Flight 4653, an Antonov An-2 biplane crashes, killing six.

26 January

- A Hellenic Air Force General Dynamics F-16 Fighting Falcon crashes into a flight line, killing 11.

28 January

- The United States Air Force announces that Boeing will build the next Air Force One. The aircraft is to be a Boeing 747-8 that is to become operational by 2023.

29 January

- A Bombardier Challenger 600 is shot down over Aruba, killing 3.

=== February ===
4 February

- TransAsia Airways Flight 235, an ATR 72-600 with 58 people on board, experiences an engine flameout just after takeoff from Taipei Songshan Airport in Taipei, Taiwan. After clearing an apartment building, the aircraft rolls sharply to the left at low altitude, and its left wingtip strikes a taxicab on the Huangdong Viaduct and the viaduct's guardrail before it crashes into the Keelung River in Taipei. Among people on the plane, the crash kills at least 35, with another eight missing and all 15 survivors injured. Two people in the taxicab also suffer injuries. Dashcams in several vehicles driving on the viaduct record the crash.

8 February

- Chilean mountaineers announce that they have discovered the wreckage of LAN-Chile Flight 621, a Douglas DC-3 carrying 24 people, including eight members of the Chilean football (soccer) team Club de Deportes Green Cross, which disappeared over the Andes Mountains in Chile during a domestic flight from Osorno to Santiago on 3 April 1961. The wreckage is in the Andes at an altitude of about 10,500 feet (3,200 meters) about 215 miles (346 kilometres) south of Santiago.

=== March ===
5 March

- Landing during a snowstorm at LaGuardia Airport in Queens, Delta Air Lines Flight 1086, a McDonnell Douglas MD-88 carrying 132 people, skids off the end of Runway 13, crashes through a perimeter fence, and comes to rest on an earthen embankment along Flushing Bay. Twenty-four people on board suffer injuries.

9 March

- Two Argentine Eurocopter AS350B3 Écureuil helicopters (registration LQ-CGK and LQ-FJQ) involved in filming the French reality television series Dropped, each carrying a pilot and four passengers, collide in mid-air at an altitude of about 100 meters (330 feet) seconds after takeoff at Villa Castelli, Argentina, crash about 15 meters (49 feet) apart, and burst into flame. All 10 people on board the two helicopters – the two Argentine pilots and eight French passengers – die. Among the dead are French athletes Florence Arthaud, Camille Muffat, and Alexis Vastine.

10 March

- Flying in dense fog, a United States Army UH-60 Black Hawk helicopter carrying an Army National Guard crew of four and seven United States Marine Corps personnel crashes in Florida's Santa Rosa Sound near Okaloosa Island, killing all 11 men on board.

13 March

- A Serbian Army Mil Mi-17 crashes, killing 7.

24 March

- Germanwings Flight 9525 – an Airbus A320-200 (registration D-AIPX) flying from Josep Tarradellas Barcelona–El Prat Airport in Barcelona, Spain, to Düsseldorf Airport in Düsseldorf, Germany, crashes near Prads-Haute-Bléone, Alpes-de-Haute-Provence, France. Evidence recovered from both the cockpit voice and flight data recorders suggests that the co-pilot, Andreas Lubitz, intentionally crashed the aircraft after preventing the captain from returning to the cockpit. All 150 people on board are killed.

27 March

- After the crash of Germanwings Flight 9525, the European Aviation Safety Agency issues a temporary recommendation for airlines to ensure that at least two crew members, including at least one pilot, are in the cockpit at all times of the flight.

29 March

- Air Canada Flight 624, an Airbus A320-211 (registration C-FTJP) with 138 people on board, lands short of the runway in snow and poor visibility at Halifax International Airport in Halifax, Nova Scotia, Canada. It smashes through an antenna array, loses its landing gear, severs the power line that supplies all of the airport's electricity, and slides to a stop on its belly, suffering severe damage. All aboard survive, but 23 people suffer injuries.

30 March

- Yemenia suspends flight operations due to military conflict at its home base, Sanaa International Airport in Sanaa, Yemen.

31 March

- Since 1 January, Airbus has booked gross orders for 121 aircraft, while Boeing has booked 116. However, after cancellations and conversions, Boeing has 110 net orders since 1 January compared with Airbus's 101. Since 1 January, Airbus has delivered 134 aircraft to customers, including one A350 and four A380s.

=== April ===
13 April

- Carson Air Flight 66, a Fairchild Swearingen Metroliner, suffers an in-flight breakup and crashes, killing all on board.

14 April

- Asiana Airlines Flight 162, an Airbus A320-200 (registration HL7762) with 82 people on board, loses height on final approach to Hiroshima Airport in Mihara, Japan, strikes an instrument landing system localizer antenna, and skids onto the runway on its tail, spinning 180 degrees before coming to a stop. Its landing gear collapses and it suffers damage to its left wing and left engine. No one is killed, but 20 of the people on board suffer injuries.

=== May ===
8 May

- To commemorate the 70th anniversary of Victory in Europe Day – when Nazi Germany surrendered to the Western Allies at the end of World War II in Europe on 8 May 1945 – the Arsenal of Democracy Flyover takes place over Washington, D.C. Fifty-six aircraft of the World War II era take part; aircraft types represented are the Piper L-4 Grasshopper, Boeing-Stearman Model 75, Fairchild PT-19, North American AT-6 Texan, Beechcraft Model 18, Curtiss P-40 Warhawk, North American B-25 Mitchell, Consolidated PBY Catalina, Douglas SBD Dauntless, Grumman F4F Wildcat, Lockheed P-38 Lightning, Consolidated B-24 Liberator, North American P-51 Mustang, Boeing B-17 Flying Fortress, Douglas C-47 Skytrain, Curtiss SB2C Helldiver, Grumman TBF Avenger, Douglas A-26 Invader, Vought F4U Corsair, and Boeing B-29 Superfortress. One Avenger suffers a mechanical malfunction as it passes the review area over the World War II Memorial and makes an immediate emergency landing at nearby Ronald Reagan Washington National Airport in Arlington County, Virginia.
- A Pakistan Air Force Mil Mi-17 crashes, killing eight.

9 May

- An Airbus A400M Atlas cargo aircraft on a test flight crashes just after takeoff from Seville Airport in Seville, Spain, killing four people and seriously injuring two. Germany and the United Kingdom ground their A400M aircraft pending an investigation of the crash.
- Russia celebrates the 70th anniversary of Nazi Germany's surrender to the Soviet Union on 9 May 1945 with a Victory Day Parade in Moscow that includes a flyover by 150 aircraft. Participating aircraft types are the Mil Mi-26, Mil Mi-17, Mil Mi-24, Mil Mi-28, Kamov Ka-50, Kazan Ansat, Mikoyan MiG-29, Mikoyan MiG-31, Sukhoi Su-24, Sukhoi Su-25, Sukhoi Su-27, Sukhoi Su-30, Sukhoi Su-34, Sukhoi Su-35, Ilyushin Il-76, Ilyushin Il-78, Tupolev Tu-22M, Tupolev Tu-95, Tupolev Tu-160, Antonov An-124 Ruslan, and Antonov An-22. Also appearing are Yakovlev Yak-130s from the new aerobatic group Crimean Wings and Sukhoi Su-27s and Mikoyan MiG-29s of the Russian Knights and Swifts aerobatics teams.

12 May

- A United States Marine Corps Bell UH-1Y Venom crashes, killing 13.

22 May

- Air Lituanica ceases flight operations. It will file for bankruptcy on 8 June.

28 May

- Eastern Airlines begins flight operations, flying charter flights from Miami International Airport in Miami, to José Martí International Airport in Havana. A new airline, it uses the trademarks of the original Eastern Air Lines, which had gone out of business in 1991; the new Eastern's ownership group had purchased the intellectual property, including trademarks, of the original Eastern in 2009.

=== June ===
2 June

- Landing his de Havilland Canada DHC-1 Chipmunk at Toronto Pearson International Airport in Toronto, Canada, retired de Havilland Canada test pilot George Neal sets the world record for oldest active licensed pilot at the age of 96 years 194 days. Neal had held a Canadian pilot's license since 1936 and flown 15,000 hours on 150 different aircraft types.

8 June

- Air Lituanica files for bankruptcy. It had ceased flight operations on 22 May.

30 June

- An Indonesian Air Force Lockheed C-130 Hercules crashes in a residential area in Medan, Indonesia, just after takeoff from Soewondo Air Force Base, striking a busy road, homes, and a hotel. The crash kills all 122 people on the plane and 19 people on the ground.

=== July ===
1 July

- A new terminal for international civilian flights, Terminal 2, opens at Pyongyang International Airport in Pyongyang, North Korea.

9 July

- An eruption of Mount Raung in East Java, Indonesia, forces the closure of five airports on Java, Bali, and Lombok through 10 July because of volcanic ash in the atmosphere, greatly disrupting air traffic in the area as flights at the airports are cancelled through late in the day on 10 July. Coming when many Australians travel to Bali on vacation and many Indonesians travel for the Eid al-Fitr holiday, the airport closures strand thousands of travelers.

10 July

- The Airbus E-Fan X makes a 74 kilometers (46 miles) flight from Lydd, England, to Calais, France, in approximately 37 minutes, flying at an altitude of around 1,000 meters (3,300 feet), becoming the first twin-engine, all-electric plane to cross the English Channel. The flight is made on the same route as that Louis Blériot used made when he made the first crossing of the English Channel in an airplane on 25 July 1909, but in the opposite direction.

29 July

- Aircraft wreckage which appears to be a flaperon – part of the flap system – of a Boeing 777 is found washed up on a beach on Réunion in the Indian Ocean, raising hopes that it is the first piece of wreckage of Malaysia Airlines Flight 370 to be found since the aircraft vanished in March 2014.

30 July

- Facebook announces that it will begin testing the full-size version of its Aquila unmanned aerial vehicle later in the year. The 1,000-pound (454-kg) aircraft has a wingspan of 140 feet (43 meters) and is designed to fly for up to 90 days at an altitude of up to 90,000 feet (27,000 meters) and use laser optics to bring Internet connectivity to parts of the world where conventional connectivity is impractical.

31 July

- An Embraer Phenom 300 crashes, killing four.

=== August ===
- Yemenia resumes flights to Yemen with a flight from Saudi Arabia to Aden International Airport in Aden.

4 August

- Les Munro, the last surviving pilot who participated in Operation Chastise, the 1943 "Dambuster" raid by the Royal Air Force's No. 617 Squadron, dies in New Zealand at the age of 96.
- A Colombian government UH-60 Black Hawk helicopter involved in a counter-narcotics operation against the Clan Úsuga criminal organization crashes into the side of a mountain in northwestern Colombia, killing 16 policemen.

5 August

- Prime Minister of Malaysia Najib Razak announces that a flaperon found on a beach on Réunion in the Indian Ocean on 29 July is from Malaysia Airlines Flight 370, a Boeing 777 which vanished in March 2014.

6 August

- Malaysia's Minister of Transportation, Liow Tiong Lai, announces that more aircraft debris – including a window and some aluminum foil – that may be from Malaysia Airlines Flight 370 has been discovered washed up on Réunion.

11 August

- Dutch prosecutors announce that investigators probing the July 2014 crash of Malaysia Airlines Flight 17 have identified possible Russian-made Buk surface-to-air missile parts mixed in with the airliner's wreckage. Ukraine and many in the West have accused pro-Russian rebels in eastern Ukraine with shooting down the airliner using a surface-to-air missile system supplied by Russia, which Russia and the rebels deny.

16 August

- Trigana Air Flight 267, an ATR 42-300 with 54 occupants aboard on a domestic flight in Indonesia from Sentani Airport in Jayapura to Oksibil crashes into a mountain in the Bintang highlands region of the Indonesian province of Papua on New Guinea. All on board die, making it the deadliest accident in the history of Trigana Air Service, as well as the deadliest accident to date involving an ATR 72.

20 August

- Two Let L-410 Turbolet aircraft carrying parachutists rehearsing for a nearby air show collide over Červený Kameň, Slovakia, at an altitude of about 5,000 feet (1,500 meters) and crash. The accident kills seven people – two crewmembers aboard each plane and three parachutists aboard one of them – but the other 31 people aboard the two planes parachute to safety. Five of them are treated for injuries. One of the dead crew members is former Slovak ice hockey player Michal Česnek.

22 August

- A Hawker Hunter T7 performing aerobatics at the Shoreham Airshow at Shoreham Airport in Shoreham-by-Sea, West Sussex, England, crashes onto the A27 road, striking several ground vehicles. The crash destroys eight ground vehicles and kills at least 11 people – including two players from the English football team Worthing United F.C. – and injures 16 others. It is the deadliest air show accident in the United Kingdom since a crash at the 1952 Farnborough Airshow which killed 31 people.

=== September ===
3 September

- The Paris prosecutor in France announces that a technician from Airbus Defence and Space in Spain had confirmed that a flaperon found washed up on Réunion in the Indian Ocean on 29 July was from the Boeing 777 that disappeared in March 2014 while operating as Malaysian Airlines Flight 370. Airbus Defence and Space had manufactured the flaperon for Boeing.

5 September

- Over eastern Senegal, Ceiba Intercontinental Airlines Flight 71, a Boeing 737-8FB (registration 3C-LLY) flying from Dakar, Senegal, to Cotonou, Benin, collides with a Senegal Airlines Hawker Siddeley HS125-700A air ambulance (registration 6V-AIM) flying from Ouagadougou, Burkina Faso, to Dakar. The Boeing 737 suffers only minor damage and diverts to Malabo, Equatorial Guinea, where it lands safely. Aboard the air ambulance, the collision apparently disables everyone on board, and it flies on autopilot beyond Dakar, finally crashing in the Atlantic Ocean about 110 km (68 miles; 59 nmi) off the coast of Senegal, presumably when it runs out of fuel. All seven people aboard the air ambulance die.

8 September

- The left engine of British Airways Flight 2276, a Boeing 777-236ER (registration G-VIIO), catches fire while the aircraft waits to take off from McCarran International Airport in Las Vegas, Nevada for a flight to London. All 170 people on board escape the plane via inflatable evacuation slides; 14 of them suffer minor injuries.

15 September

- A South African Beechcraft King Air 200 becomes the first aircraft in history to land at Saint Helena's new Saint Helena Airport. The plane is visiting the island to conduct a series of flights to calibrate the airport's radio navigation equipment.

23 September

- Iran's Tasnim News Agency reports that the Islamic Republic of Iran Army has unveiled the Mohajem 92, a new unmanned aerial vehicle (UAV) manufactured by the "self-suffiency department" of the Islamic Republic of Iran Air Force. Tasnim reports that the new UAV is a reconnaissance vehicle with a range of 500 kilometers (310 miles) and a maximum speed of 200 km/h (120 mph).

=== October ===
- SATA International is rebranded as Azores Airlines.

1 October>

- Tracey Curtis-Taylor begins a 13,000-mile (21,000 km) solo flight from Farnborough Airport in Farnborough, England, to Sydney, Australia, in the Boeing-Stearman Model 75 open-cockpit biplane Spirit of Artemis, intending to recreate the first solo flight between the United Kingdom and Australia by a woman, the 1930 Croydon-to-Darwin flight of Amy Johnson. Curtis-Taylor will arrive in Sydney on 9 January 2016.

2 October

- Aviastar Flight 7503, a de Havilland Canada DHC-6 Twin Otter (registration PK-BRM) crashes in South Sulawesi, Indonesia, soon after takeoff for a domestic flight from Andi Jemma Airport in Masamba to Sultan Hasanuddin International Airport in Makassar, killing all 10 people on board. Its wreckage is not found until 5 October.
- A United States Air Force C-130J Hercules crashes at Jalalabad Airport in Jalalabad, Afghanistan, killing all 11 people – six U.S. Air Force members and five civilians – on board. A further three on the ground were also killed. The Taliban claims to have shot it down, but the United States armed forces respond that enemy fire is highly unlikely to have caused the crash.

13 October

- The Dutch Safety Board releases its report on the crash of Malaysian Airlines Flight 17 in July 2014, in which it concludes that a Russian-made Buk surface-to-air missile brought the Boeing 777 down, blowing its cockpit off and causing it to break up in mid-air over Ukraine before crashing. It adds that the aircraft should not have flown over the war zone in eastern Ukraine, but also notes that 160 other aircraft did so safely on the day Flight 17 was shot down. Although the report does not attempt to determine who shot the airliner down, the Russian government dismisses it as biased and the result of "political orders" to reach the conclusion that it did.

17 October

- An Airbus A321 operating as US Airways Flight 1939 – commemorating the year of the airline's founding – lands before dawn at the airline's hub in Philadelphia, Pennsylvania, completing a journey begun from Philadelphia on 16 October that stopped at all of US Airways' other hubs – at Charlotte, North Carolina; Phoenix, Arizona; and San Francisco, California. When it lands, the 76-year history of US Airways – which earlier had done business as All American Aviation, Allegheny Airlines, and USAir – comes to an end as it completes its merger with American Airlines. The merger leaves the United States with just four major domestic airlines – American, Delta Air Lines, Southwest Airlines, and United Airlines – down from ten in 2001; the four control 87 percent of the U.S. domestic market.

25 October

- The bankrupt Russian airline Transaero goes out of business.

29 October

- The left engine of Dynamic Airways Flight 405, a Boeing 767-200ER with 101 people aboard bound for Caracas, Venezuela, leaks fuel and bursts into flames as the aircraft taxis for takeoff at Fort Lauderdale–Hollywood International Airport in Broward County, Florida. The airliner's passengers and crew evacuate via evacuation slides in six minutes; 17 of them are injured. The airport is closed for about two-and-a-half hours, resulting in the cancellation of 43 flights and delays to more than 200 others.

31 October

- Metrojet Flight 9268, an Airbus A321-231 operated by the Russian airline Kogalymavia bound for Saint Petersburg, Russia, breaks apart in midair near its cruising altitude of 31,000 feet (9,400 m) 23 minutes after takeoff from Sharm el-Sheikh International Airport in Sharm el-Sheikh, Egypt, and crashes in the central Sinai Peninsula, killing all 224 people on board. The Islamic State claims to have brought the plane down, but does not describe how, and experts claim that the Islamic State has no weapons capable of hitting the airliner at the altitude at which it was flying when the incident occurred; after the crash, Air France-KLM, Emirates, and Lufthansa nonetheless announce that their airliners will avoid flying over the Sinai Peninsula.

=== November ===
1 November

- Air Arabia, Emirates, flydubai, Gulf Air, Jazeera Airways, and Qatar Airways announce that they will reroute their aircraft to avoid flying over the Sinai Peninsula in the wake of 31 October crash of Metrojet Flight 9268. British Airways and Etihad Airways say that they will continue to fly over the Sinai.

4 November

- Volcanic ash from an eruption of Mount Rinjani on Lombok in Indonesia forces Ngurah Rai International Airport on Bali to close until 5 November, prompting the cancellation of 59 international and 47 domestic flights. Lombok International Airport in Mataram on Lombok also closes because of the ash.
- An overloaded Antonov An-12 cargo aircraft (registration EY-406) operated by Allied Services, Ltd., carrying a crew of six and at least 12 passengers crashes into a farming village on an island in the White Nile shortly after takeoff from Juba International Airport in Juba, South Sudan. The crash kills a combined 37 people aboard the plane and on the ground; two people aboard the plane survive.

10 November

- Execuflight Flight 1526, a Hawker 800 business jet, crashes into an apartment complex while on approach to land at Akron Fulton International Airport in Akron, Ohio. No one on the ground is injured, but all nine people – two pilots and seven passengers – aboard the plane die.

21 November

- A Eurocopter AS350 Écureuil sightseeing helicopter operated by Alpine Adventures crashes on Fox Glacier on the South Island of New Zealand, killing all seven people on board.

22 November

- Avia Traffic Company Flight 768, a Boeing 737 Classic, crashed following a runway overrun, injuring 14.

23 November

- The search for Malaysian Airlines Flight 370, a Boeing 777 missing since March 2014, shifts to a remote part of the Indian Ocean southwest of Australia where an experienced British Boeing 777 captain, Simon Hardy, estimates that it may have made a controlled water landing and sunk largely intact. The Australian Transport Safety Bureau reports that the shift is occurring because of improved Southern Hemisphere spring weather in a 120,000-square-kilometer (46,000-square-mile) priority search area rather than because of Hardy's analysis. Although a flaperon from Flight 370 found in July 2015 washed up on a beach on Réunion was from Flight 370, the search for Flight 370 on the Indian Ocean floor, taking place more than 1,800 kilometers (1,100 miles) off the Australian coast since October 2014, has covered 70,000 square kilometers (27,000 square miles) without finding any trace of the airliner.

24 November

- A Turkish Air Force General Dynamics F-16 Fighting Falcon shot down a Russian Air Force Sukhoi Su-24, killing one.

29 November

- The last Boeing C-17 Globemaster III, intended for delivery to the United Arab Emirates Air Force in 2017, takes off from the Boeing assembly plant at Long Beach, California, conducting a flyover of the facility before departing. Boeing, which delivered the U.S. Air Force's last C-17 in September 2013, plans to close the Long Beach plant by the end of 2015 – except for small sections left open for one to two more years to provide engineering support for C-17s – because of insufficient foreign orders for the C-17 to justify keeping the assembly line open.

=== December ===
22 December

- A Beechcraft King Air operated by the Indian Border Security Force crashes, killing 10.

30 December

- A South African teenager finds a piece of debris on a beach in Mozambique and takes it home to South Africa. In March 2016, his family will turn the debris in to South African aviation officiaLs, who plan to examine it to see if it is from Malaysian Airlines Flight 370, a Boeing 777 missing since 8 March 2014.

== First flights ==
=== February ===
- 3 February - Embraer KC-390 - PT-ZNF
- 6 February - Dassault Falcon 8X - F-WWQA
- 6 February - Enstrom TH180 - N180TH
- 27 February - Bombardier CS300 - C-FFDK

=== March ===
- 7 March - Kamov Ka-52K

=== April ===
- 9 April - Flight Design C4 - D-EZFD

=== May ===
- 7 May - Antonov An-178 - UR-EXP
- 11 May Pilatus PC-24 - HB-VXA
- 18 May Gulfstream G500 - N500GA
- 22 May Sikorsky S-97 Raider - N971SK

=== June ===
- 13 June - Airbus Helicopters H160 - F-WWOG

=== July ===
- 1 July - Bell 525 Relentless - N525TA

=== September ===
- 2 September – Windward Performance Perlan II
- 14 September - Aero L-39NG
- 25 September – Boeing KC-46 Pegasus

=== October ===
- 5 October - KAI KT-100 - 16-001
- 27 October - Sikorsky CH-53K King Stallion

=== November ===
- 11 November - Mitsubishi Regional Jet

=== December ===
- 19 December - Epic E1000 - N331FT
- 25 December - KB SAT SR-10

== Entered service ==
- 15 January – Airbus A350 with Qatar Airways
- 31 July – F-35B Lighting II, United States Marine Corps version of the Lockheed Martin F-35 Lightning II Joint Strike Fighter, with Marine Fighter Attack Squadron 121 (VMFA-121); first version of the F-35 to enter service

== Retirements ==
- 1 August – Boeing Vertol CH-46 Sea Knight by the United States Marine Corps; the last one to fly is a CH-46E model
- 29 September – Boeing Vertol HH-46 Sea Knight by the United States Navy; the last one to fly is an HH-46E model

== Deadliest crash ==
The deadliest crash of this year was Metrojet Flight 9268, an Airbus A321 which was destroyed by a terrorist bomb in the Sinai peninsula of Egypt on 31 October, killing all 224 people on board.
