= 2021 Nigerian Air Force Beechcraft King Air crash =

Military plane crash in Nigeria

Coordinates: 10°41′45″N 7°19′15″E

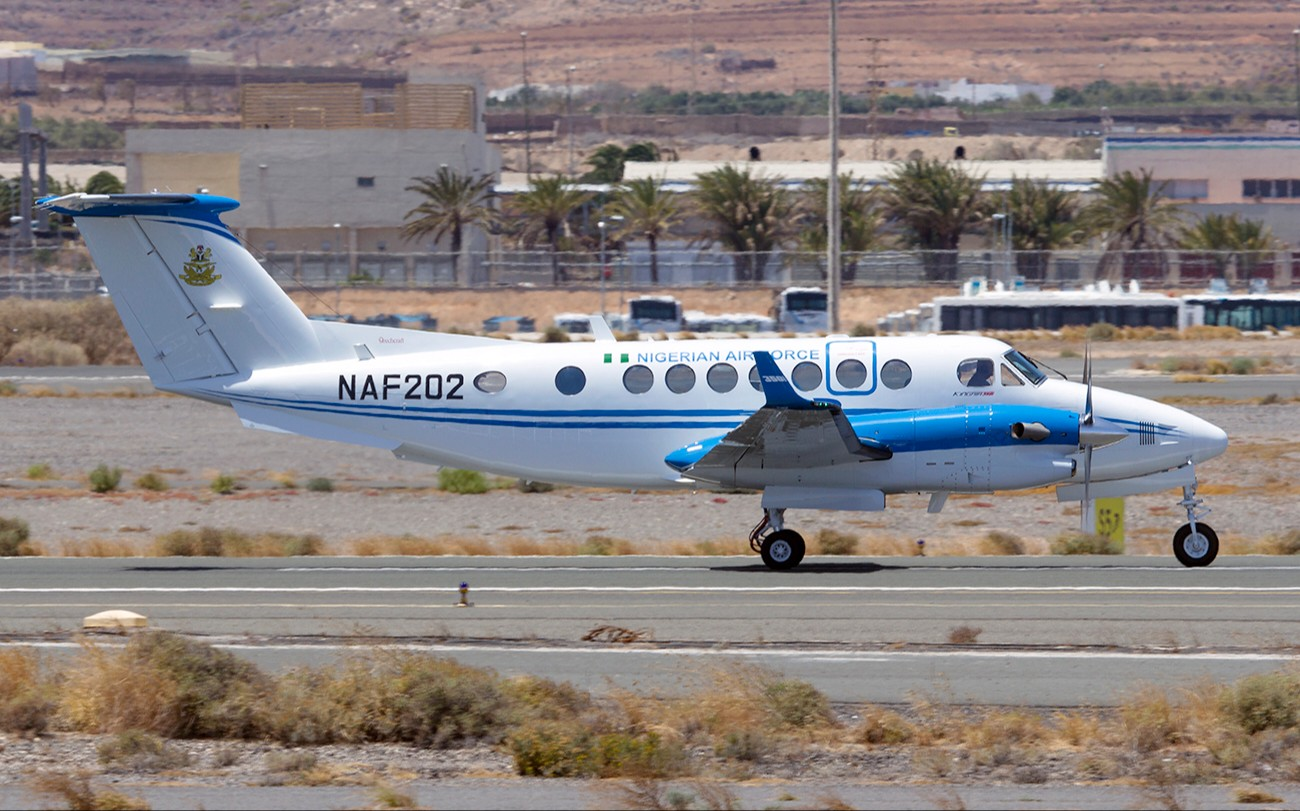
- a Nigerian Air Force Beechcraft B300 King Air 350i, similar to the two crashed in 2021

Accident
- Date: 21 May 2021
- Summary: Crashed on route; under investigation
- Site: near Kaduna International Airport, Kaduna, Nigeria

Aircraft
- Aircraft type: Beechcraft King Air 350i
- Operator: Nigerian Air Force
- Registration: NAF203
- Flight origin: Nnamdi Azikiwe International Airport, Abuja, Nigeria
- Destination: Kaduna International Airport, Kaduna, Nigeria
- Occupants: 11
- Passengers: 7
- Crew: 4
- Fatalities: 11
- Injuries: 0
- Survivors: 0

On 21 May 2021, a Beechcraft King Air 350i belonging to the Nigerian Air Force crashed near the Kaduna International Airport, killing all 11 occupants, including the Chief of Army Staff of the Nigerian Army Ibrahim Attahiru.

== Aircraft ==
The Nigerian Air Force had six Beechcraft B300 King Air 350i. The NAF201 also crashed on 21 February, 2021.

== Accident ==
On the evening of 21 May 2021, a Nigerian Air Force Beechcraft King Air 350i was taking the army chief Ibrahim Attahiru and ten other occupants to the northern state of Kaduna to attend a Nigerian Army recruit passing out parade the following day. During the flight the aircraft crashed, killing all on board including Attahiru.

== See also ==
- List of accidents and incidents involving military aircraft (2020–present)
