= 2015 Indian Border Security Force King Air crash =

Aviation accident in Delhi, India

Coordinates: 28°34′07″N 077°06′44″E

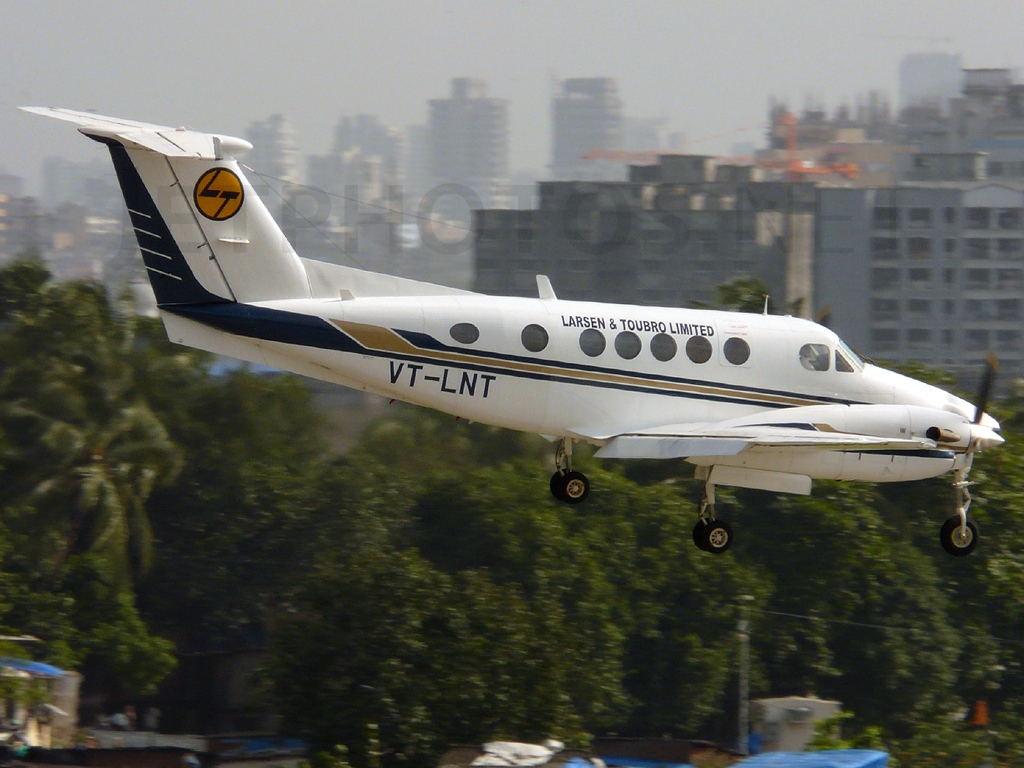
- A Beechcraft Super King Air similar to the crashed aircraft

Accident
- Date: 22 December 2015
- Summary: Pilot error leading to spatial disorientation and loss of control
- Site: Indira Gandhi International Airport, Delhi, India
- Total fatalities: 10
- Total injuries: 1

Aircraft
- Aircraft type: Beechcraft Super King Air 200
- Operator: Border Security Force
- Registration: VT-BSA
- Flight origin: Indira Gandhi International Airport, Delhi, India
- Destination: Ranchi Airport, Ranchi, India
- Occupants: 10
- Passengers: 8
- Crew: 2
- Fatalities: 10
- Survivors: 0

Ground casualties
- Ground injuries: 1

On 22 December 2015, a light aircraft of the Indian Border Security Force crashed within the grounds of Indira Gandhi International Airport in Delhi, India. Ten personnel of the Border Security Force, three officers and seven senior technicians, were killed. The 22-year-old Beechcraft B200 King Air took off for Ranchi just before 9.30am, before crashing shortly afterwards.

== Aircraft ==
The aircraft involved in the accident was a 22-year-old Beechcraft B200 King Air.

== Passengers and crew ==
The plane had two pilots, each with a commercial pilot licence.

In addition to the pilots, the plane was carrying eight technicians to Ranchi to repair a helicopter.

== Accident ==
After the aircraft's engines were started the crew reported that there was a problem (the nature of which has not been reported), but continued with the flight after receiving advice from ground staff. The aircraft took off at 9:27am local time with an expected arrival time at Ranchi of 12:00pm.

Soon after taking off, the crew informed air traffic control that something was wrong and that they would return to Delhi. The pilots were then cleared to make an emergency landing on Delhi's Runway 28. At 9:40 AM, contact was lost with the aircraft. The plane then veered to the left, narrowly missing a village. It brushed a tree before hitting the perimeter wall of the airport and crashed into a sewage treatment plant within the airport complex. The aircraft then caught fire and was destroyed. All ten occupants were killed and another on the ground was injured.

== Cause ==
The cause can be attributed to pilot error who incorrectly activated the autopilot and failed to take the proper corrective action. Five recommendations are also made.
