= 2015 Aruba Challenger 601 crash =

Smugglers aircraft shot down near Aruba

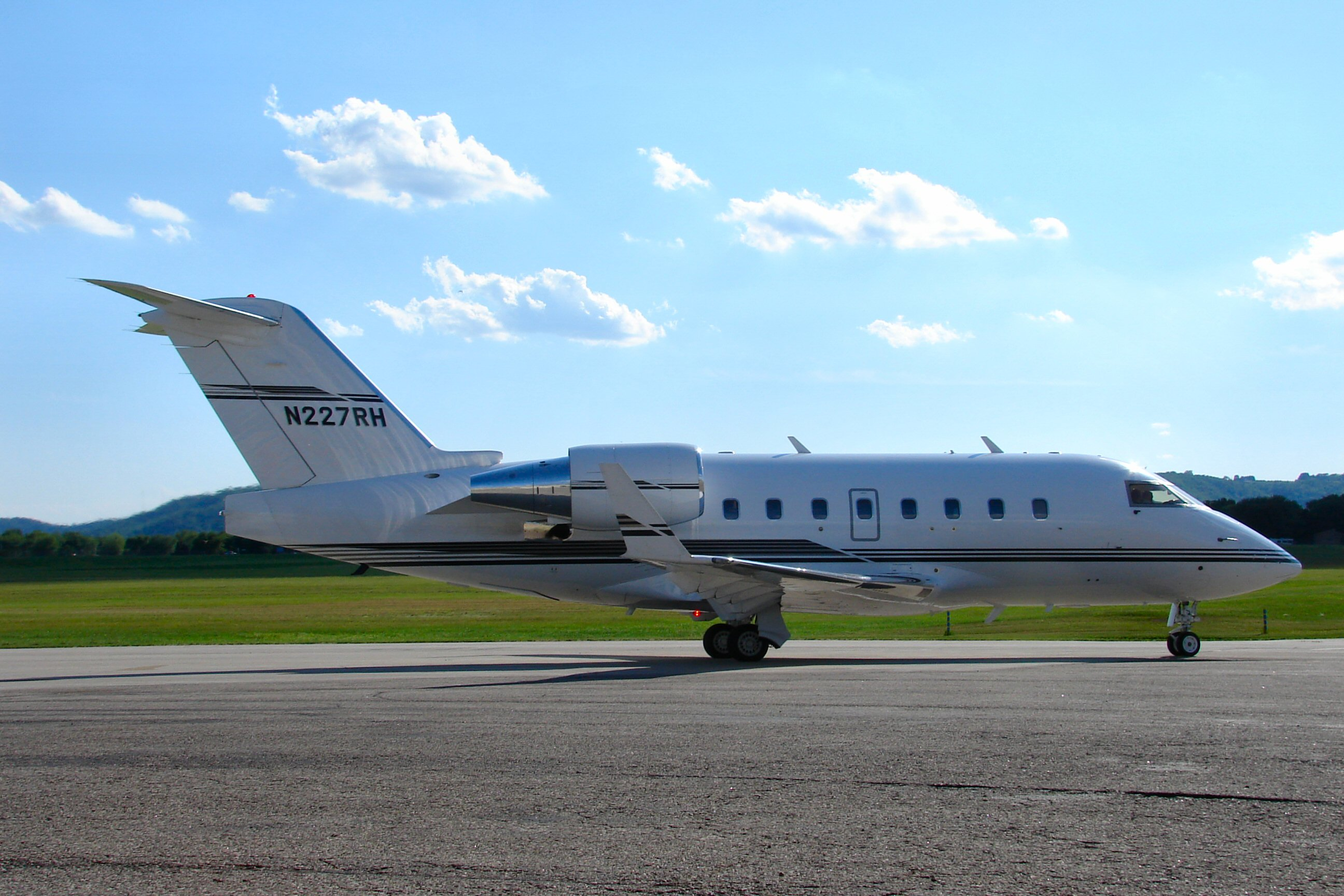
- A Challenger 601 similar to the one involved in the crash

Shootdown
- Date: January 29, 2015
- Summary: Shot down by the Venezuelan Air Force
- Site: Southeastern coast of Aruba

Aircraft
- Aircraft type: Canadair CL-601 Challenger
- Operator: Dinama Aircorp Inc.
- Registration: N214FW
- Flight origin: Las Flecheras Airport, Apure, Venezuela
- Destination: Unknown
- Occupants: 3
- Crew: 3
- Fatalities: 3
- Survivors: 0

On January 29, 2015, a Canadair CL-601 Challenger aircraft was shot down while flying over Aruba. It crashed on the southeastern coast of the island, killing all 3 people on board. The Venezuelan Air Force claimed responsibility for the downing of the jet. The crash was the deadliest aviation accident or incident in the history of Aruba.

== Aircraft ==
The downed aircraft was a Canadair CL-601 Challenger (registration number N214FW, serial number 3008). It was manufactured in 1983. In July 2013, less than two weeks after the founding of Dinama Aircorp Inc., it was purchased by it and registered at an address in Delaware (USA), where more than 200 more aircraft were registered. Challenger flew for two Colombian drug kingpins, Dicson Penagos-Casanova and Juan Gabriel Rios Sierra, who joined forces to supply cocaine to some cartels in the United States. According to the flight tracking service FlightAware, the plane was flying from Florida to Mexico. Almost 3 years after the disaster, the plane was deregistered and written down.

== Accident ==
On January 29, 2015, the plane took off from the runway in the state of Apure, Venezuela. Information about where the plane was going remains unknown. Venezuelan Defense Minister Vladimir Padrino said the plane ignored the signals during takeoff. The plane was escorted by military jets of the Venezuelan Air Force. According to Vladimir Padrino, the plane disobeyed orders and was "annulled" 25 miles northeast of the Josefa Camejo military base. Eyewitnesses recorded a video of the plane crash: suddenly the plane burst into flames and flew upward for a while until it crashed off the coast of Aruba. All 3 people on board were killed. At 6:45 a.m., Aruba police received a call about a plane crash on the southeastern coast of the island.

== Investigation ==
Aruban officials have begun investigating the crash. Aruban Justice Minister Arthur Dowers demanded that Venezuela confirm whether military jets fired at the plane before it crashed. Venezuelan Defense Minister Vladimir Padrino confirmed this information.

At the crash site, investigators found 400 packages of drugs, mostly cocaine. Also, the remains of three people were found among the tons of drugs.

It turned out that the owner and only official of the airline Dinama Aircorp, which in turn owned the downed aircraft, was Conrad Kulatz, a lawyer from Fort Lauderdale, who in July 2013 (shortly before the founding of Dinama Aircorp), the Florida Bar Association listed as ineligible to practice law because he did not meet the continuing legal education requirement. At the same time, the airline Dinama Aircorp was founded. There were more than 200 aircraft registered at the address where she was registered, including the plane seized by the Dominican Republic. It was Kulatz and another lawyer who registered him with the US Federal Aviation Administration (FAA). Kulatz also registered airplanes in the United States, on which traces of drug smuggling were found in 2013. It was discovered that three of them were illegally registered in the United States in the name of a Mexican citizen. Thus, Kulatz deceived the FAA by simply specifying a shopping mall in Texas near the Mexican border as his address and claiming to be a US citizen.

At that time, two Colombian drug kingpins, Dicson Penagos-Casanova and Juan Gabriel Rios Sierra, were looking for American planes to supply drugs, as they believed it would be easier for them to "fly under the radar". They rented flight N214FW, which belonged to Dinama Aircorp. To ensure success, they paid the owner of the plane a commission of about 30-35 percent of the cocaine shipment and bribed Venezuelan military and government officials, according to federal court records.

In the case of drug smuggling by air, Dixon Penagos-Casanova and Juan Gabriel Rios Sierra were arrested in 2016. On June 29, 2020, the District Court of the Central District of California, Penagos-Kasanova was sentenced. The founder of Dinama Aircorp, Conrad Kulatz, whose plane was involved in transporting cocaine to the United States and Venezuela, was not convicted of offenses in connection with this case, and died in 2021 at the age of 81.
