= Beechcraft Super King Air =

Light twin-turboprop transport aircraft family

Super King Air
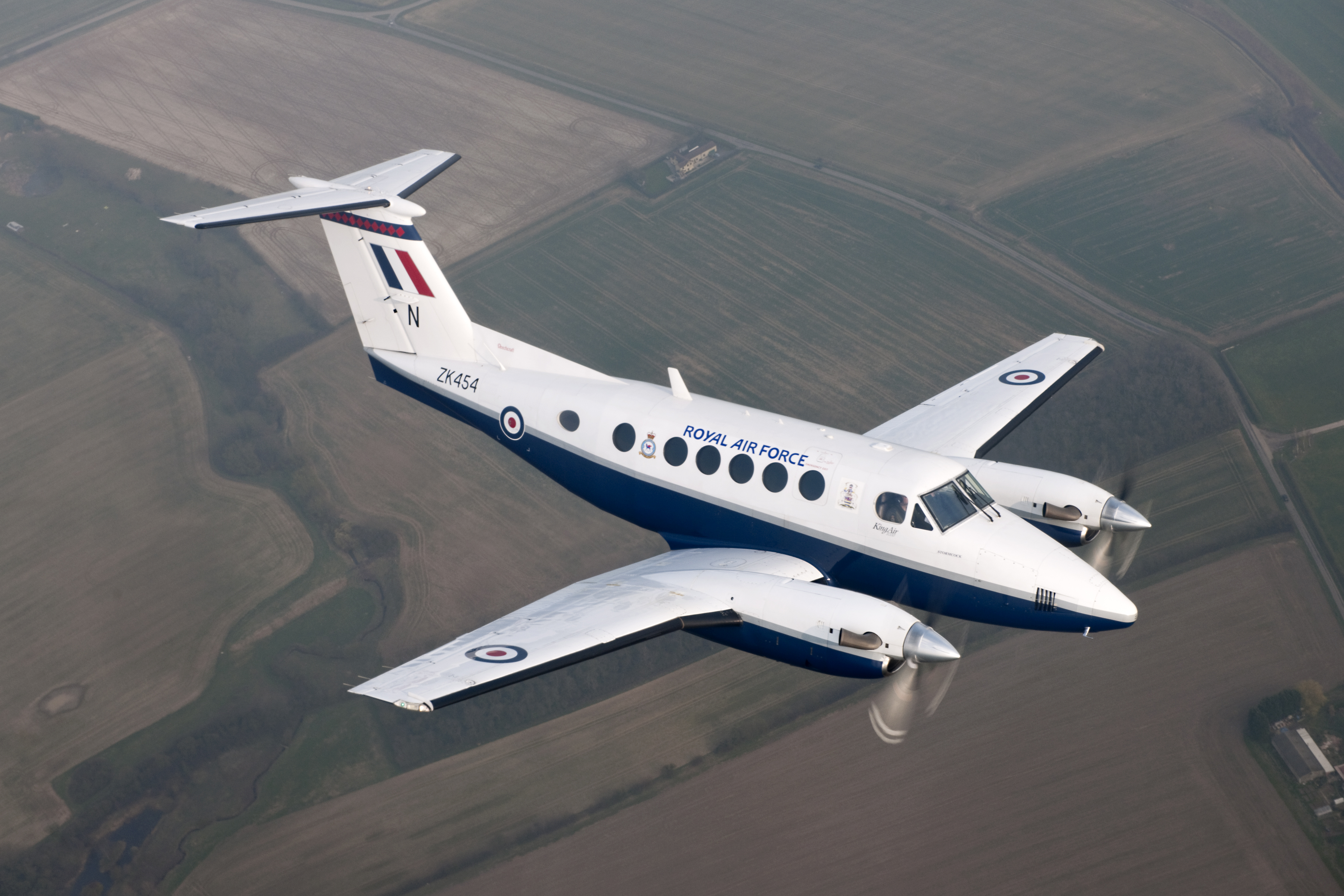
- A King Air B200 of No. 45 Squadron Royal Air Force

General information
- Type: Civil utility aircraft
- Manufacturer: Beechcraft
- Status: Active service
- Primary users: United States Air Force United States Army; Royal Flying Doctor Service; Royal Australian Air Force
- Number built: 4,442 (at end of 2025)

History
- Manufactured: 1972–present
- Introduction date: 1972 (military); February 1974 (civil)
- First flight: October 27, 1972
- Developed from: Beechcraft King Air
- Variant: Beechcraft C-12 Huron
- Developed into: Beechcraft 1900

The Beechcraft Super King Air family is part of a line of twin-turboprop aircraft produced by Beechcraft. The Model 200 and Model 300 series were originally marketed as the "Super King Air" family; the "Super" designation was dropped in 1996. They form the King Air line together with the King Air Model 90 and 100 series.

Beechcraft currently offers the 250 (design. B200GT) and the larger 350i (B300) models. The 350ER (B300CER) is available to government, military and commercial customers for special mission operations such as aerial survey, air ambulance, flight inspection and surveillance. The Beechcraft 1900 regional airliner was derived from the Model B200 King Air.

The Super King Air family has been in continuous production since 1974, the longest production run of any civilian turboprop aircraft in its class. It outlasted all of its previous competitors, and even its intended replacement, the Model 2000 Starship. As of March 2025, the only other pressurized multi-engine turboprop utility aircraft in production is the Piaggio P.180 Avanti.

== Development ==
=== Super King Air 200 ===
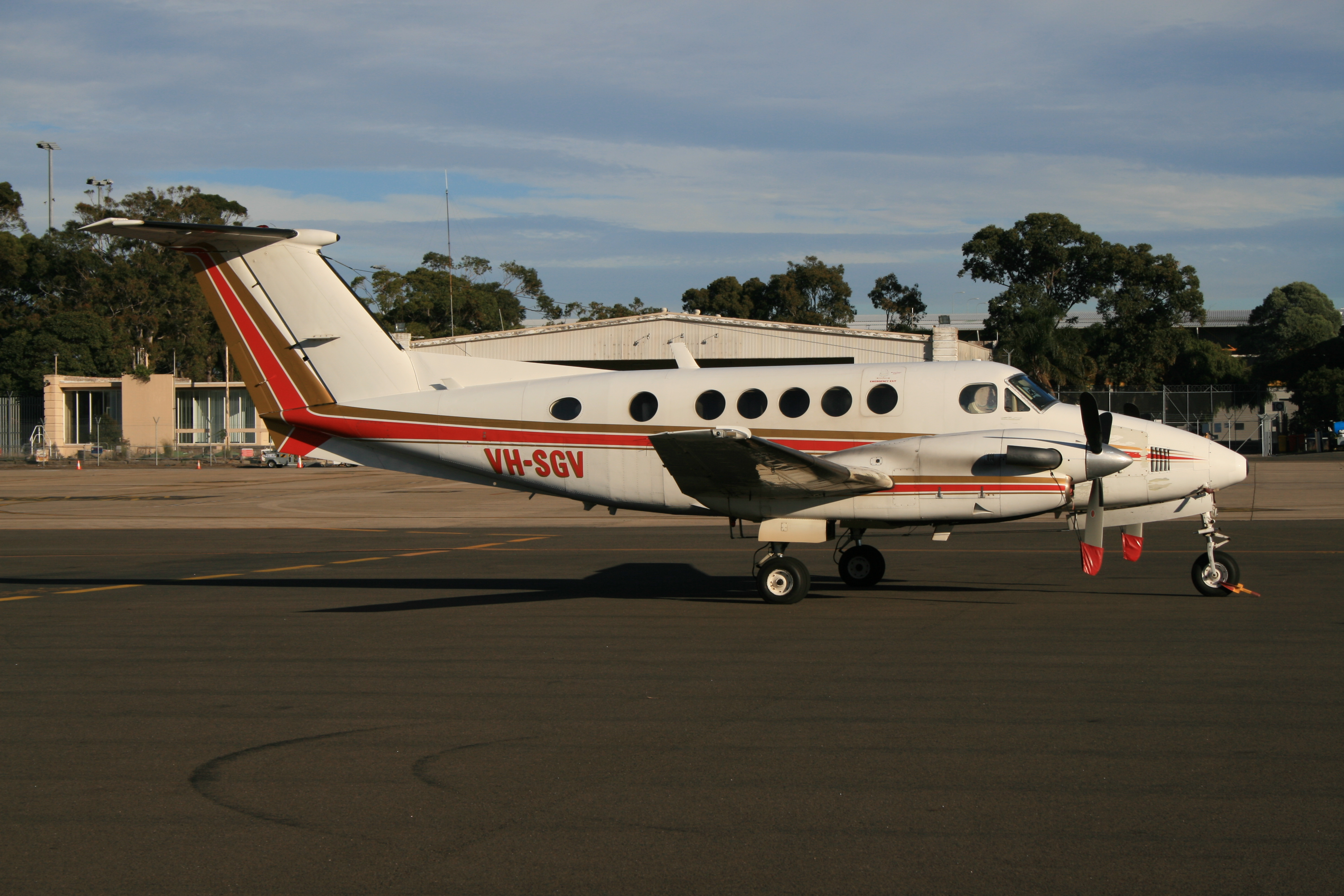
1980-built Beechcraft 200 Super King Air

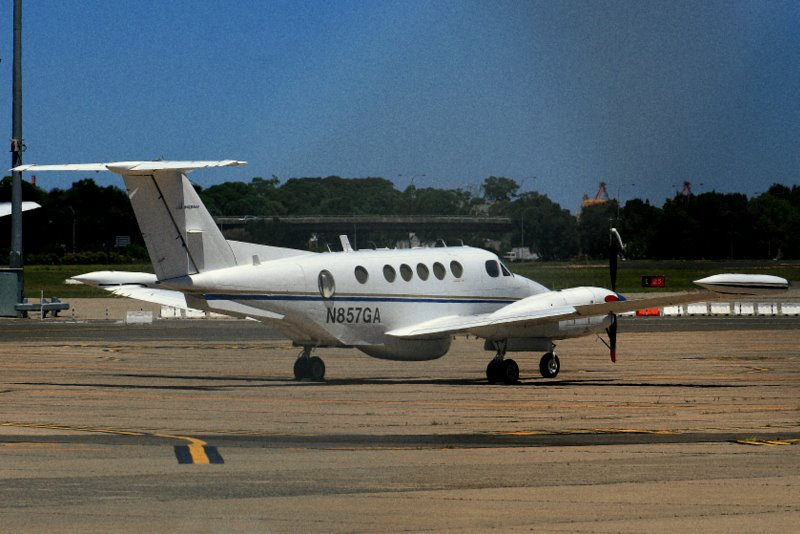
This 200T Super King Air built in 1979 shows all the major modifications for this variant; belly radar pod and camera hatch, wingtip fuel tanks, and domed window on the side of the rear fuselage.

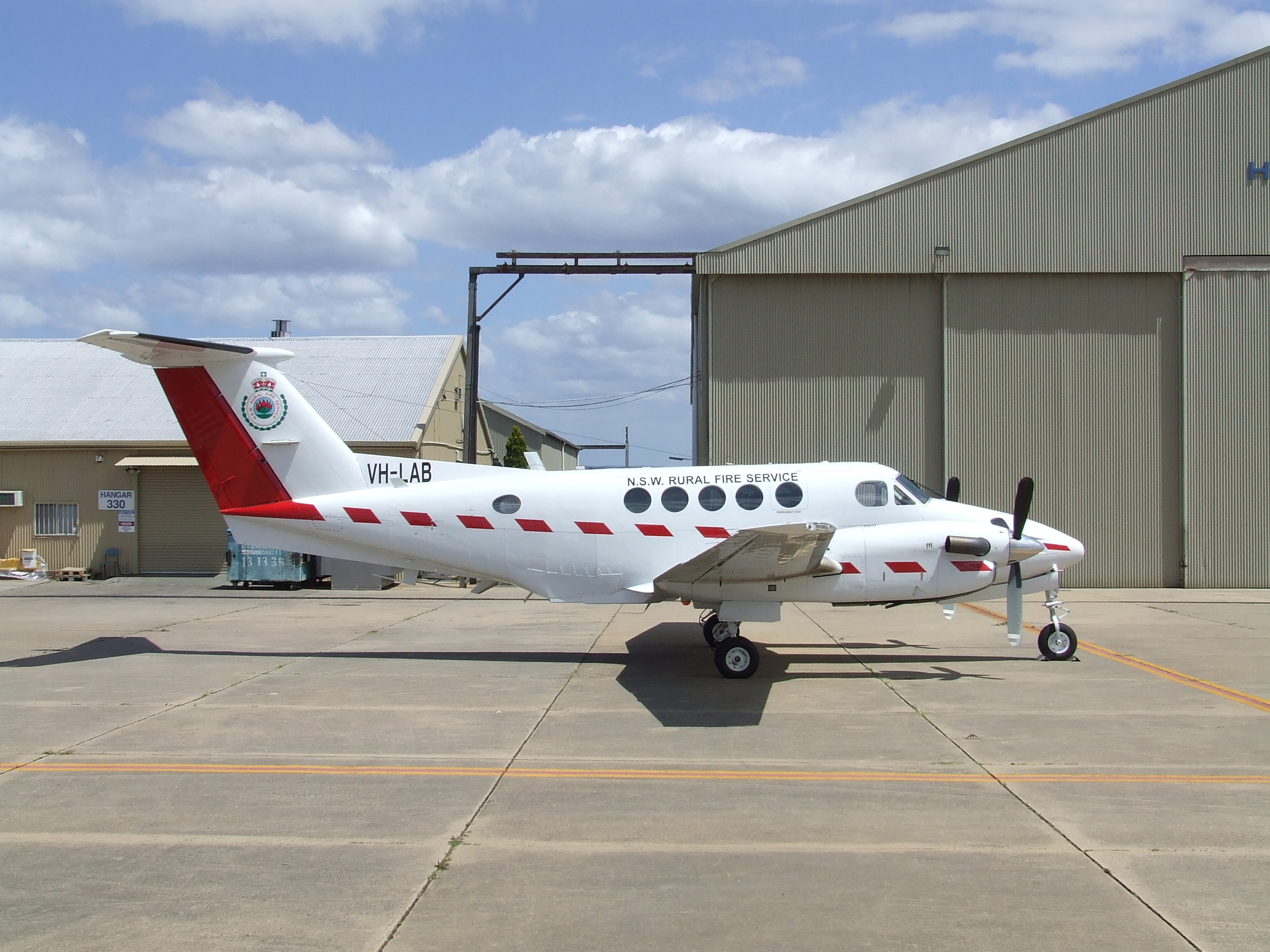
Beechcraft B200T Super King Air with belly camera hatch aft of the wing

The Model 200 was originally conceived as the Model 101 in 1969, and was a development of the Model 100 King Air. The Model 200 had essentially the same fuselage as the Model 100, with changes to the rear fuselage to accommodate a new T-tail (in place of the 100's conventional tail with all-moving trimmable horizontal stabilizer) and structural changes to allow a higher pressurization differential. Apart from the T-tail, other changes included Pratt & Whitney Canada PT6A-41 engines rated at 850 shp (630 kW) instead of the 680 shp (510 kW) engines of the Model A100 then in production, and an increased wing span with extra fuel capacity. Overall, the 200 was 3 ft 10 in (117 cm) longer than the A100, with a wingspan 4 ft 3 in (130 cm) greater, containing 60 US gallons (50 imp gal; 230 L) more fuel. Maximum Take-Off Weight (MTOW) was increased by 1,000 lb (450 kg). After protracted development, including extensive wind tunnel testing of the design (especially of the T-tail which was wind tunnel-tested for 375 hours), the first prototype flew for the first time on October 27, 1972; a second prototype took to the air on December 15 the same year. Three production aircraft were built in 1972 and delivered to the U.S. Army; these three were designated Model A100-1s by Beechcraft and were given the military designation RU-21J; the first of some 400 T-tail King Airs to be ordered by the U.S. armed forces. The 200 received civil certification in December 1973 and the first civil delivery took place in February 1974.

In 1976, Beechcraft developed the Model 200T, a version configured for aerial surveying or reconnaissance. The prototype was created by modifying a Model 200 aircraft, constructor's number (c/no.) BB-186; the modifications included changes to the belly aft of the wing to allow photography with a vertical camera, provision for a surveillance radar in a pod under the fuselage, dome-shaped windows on the sides of the rear fuselage to allow observation directly below the aircraft by occupants, and a 50-US-gallon (42 imp gal; 190 L) usable capacity fuel tank on each wingtip to increase the aircraft's range. Customers could specify any combination of these modifications when ordering a 200T; all 200Ts were Model 200s modified at the factory and given new constructor's numbers.

The next model was the Model 200C in 1979, equipped with a large cargo door on the left-hand side of the rear fuselage with an airstair door similar to the Model 200's door built into it. The door opening was 4 ft 4 in (1.33 m) high and 4 ft 4 in (1.33 m) wide, allowing a larger range of items to be loaded into the cabin, and the new model was popularly outfitted as an air ambulance. The 200C fuselage was a new design and not a modification of the Model 200 fuselage. The Model A200C military version was developed concurrently. In 1981, a Model 200C (c/no. BL-24) was modified as the Model 200CT, fitted with the same wingtip fuel tanks as installed on Model 200Ts; there was only one 200CT, but it led to other aircraft after an updated version of the Model 200 entered production.

This updated and improved version was the Model B200, which entered production in 1981. Fitted with PT6A-42 engines, rated at 850 shp (630 kW), but with improvements that resulted in greater aircraft performance. Other changes included increased pressurization differential of 6.5 psi (450 hPa) and changes to the cockpit layout. The Model 200C gave way to the Model B200C the same year, with the first Model B200T and Model B200CT modified from a B200 and B200C respectively, the following year. Commencing in 1984 the B200, B200C and their derivatives were fitted with a revised landing gear retraction mechanism, actuated by hydraulic rams powered by an electric pump installed in the Left wing. This replaced the earlier electro-mechanical retraction system of gearboxes, driveshafts and chains and sprockets that was a throwback to the Twin Bonanza. At the same time the propellers fitted were changed from 3-bladed Hartzells to 3-bladed McCauleys. Forty-seven B200Cs built that year were delivered to the U.S. military, with dozens more of a similar standard ordered in subsequent years, but not given official civil model designations.

A total of 14 B200s were produced in 1989 and 1990 in a 13-seat high density configuration with a belly cargo pod; these were marketed by Beechcraft as a commuter airliner under the designation Model 1300. Customers for this version included Mesa Airlines. The propeller installation changed again in 1992, when Beechcraft offered the option of having 4-bladed Hartzell or McCauley propellers, or 3-bladed Hartzell propellers; the 3-bladed McCauley propellers were no longer available. From October 1995 Beechcraft offered an updated B200 with Electronic Flight Instrument System (EFIS) avionics, marketed as the "B200SE Super King Air" (for Special Edition). The following year the "Super" name was dropped from all marketing and advertising. In October 2003, Beechcraft announced another avionics upgrade for the B200, the Rockwell Collins Pro Line 21 suite.

The B200 remains in production, with a total of 13 built in 2009. The B200C is available for order; in January 2009 two B200Cs were delivered to the Royal Flying Doctor Service (RFDS). The two B200Cs were the first examples delivered in about three years (the most recent B200Cs prior to this were two delivered in early 2006 for use as air ambulances in Scotland). On May 21, 2007, during the 7th Annual European Business Aviation Convention & Exhibition in Geneva, Hawker Beechcraft (as the company was now known) introduced the Model B200GT updated version of the B200. The B200GT is fitted with a new model of PT6 engine developed specifically for it by Pratt & Whitney Canada; while still rated at 850 shp (630 kW) the new PT6A-52 develops maximum power to an even higher altitude than the −42 it replaces, thus further improving aircraft performance. The B200GT and B200CGT with large cargo door were certified by the Federal Aviation Administration (FAA) on November 16, 2007 and by the end of 2009, 97 B200GTs had been delivered. Hawker Beechcraft has elected to use new constructor's number prefixes for the B200GT and B200CGT; B200GTs are being built with the prefix "BY" and B200CGTs with the prefix "BZ".

In 2014 Beechcraft announced the availability of an option (available at manufacture and for existing aircraft) to increase the MTOW of the B200GT from 12,500 pounds (5,700 kg) to 13,420 pounds (6,090 kg), marketed as the King Air 250EP (for Extra Payload). The upgrade puts the 250EP into the same weight class as the King Air 350, necessitating various system changes to meet certification requirements and a special rating for pilots. In 2019, the 250 unit cost was US$6.61M (~$8.2 million in 2025).

==== King Air 260 ====
On December 2, 2020, Textron updated the King Air 200 series with the 260, with deliveries expected in early 2021. The model has an improved autothrottle, a Multi-Scan weather radar, a range of 1,720 nmi (1,980 mi; 3,190 km) and a top cruise speed of 310 kn (360 mph; 570 km/h) with up to nine passengers. The type was FAA certified in March 2021, and European Aviation Safety Agency type certified in September 2021.

In 2023, its equipped price was $7.78M.

==== Model 200 military variants ====
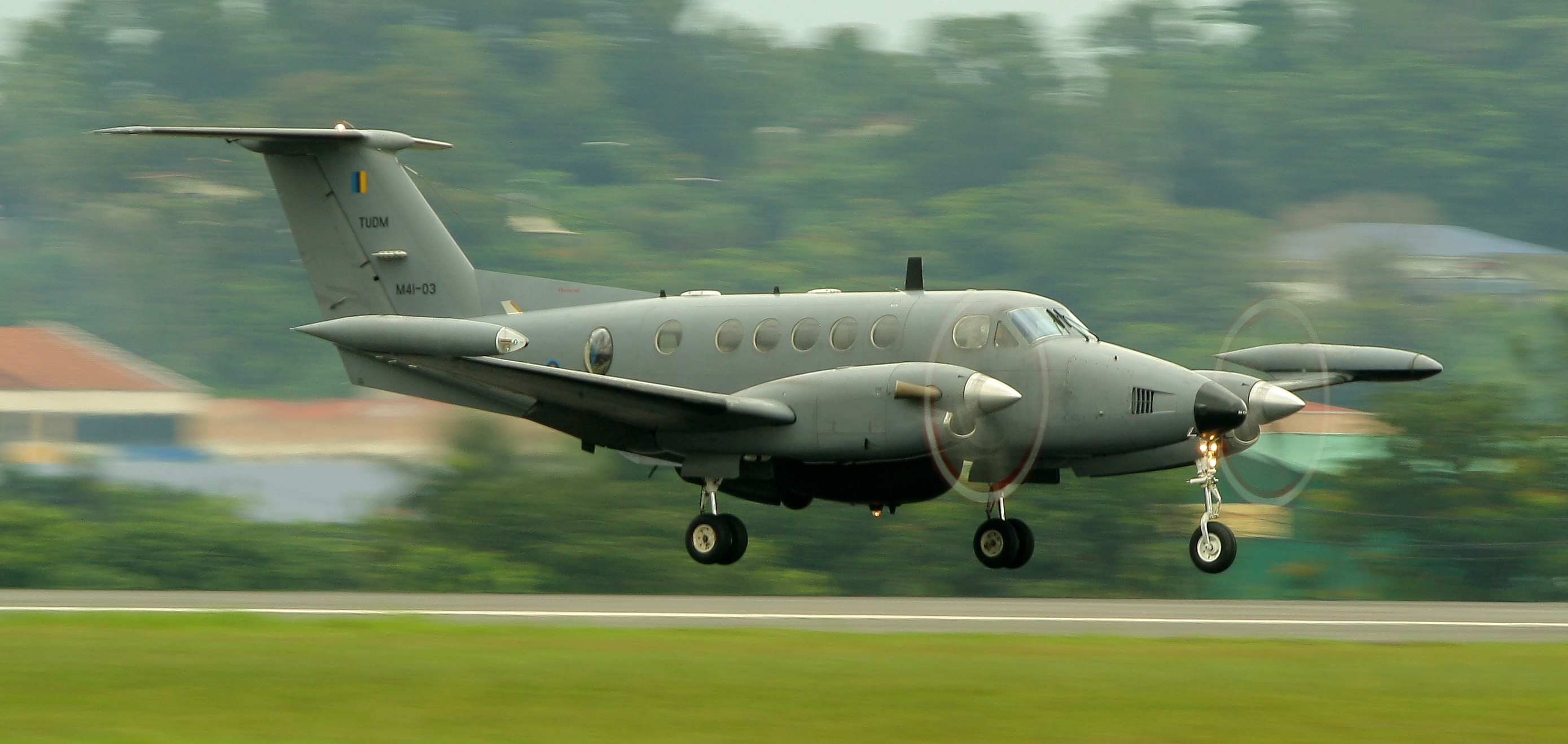
B200T variant operated by Royal Malaysian Air Force as a maritime patrol aircraft

The United States Army, Air Force, Navy and Marine Corps have all flown versions of the Super King Air 200. As noted above some have been "off-the-shelf" civil versions, but the majority have been purpose-built for the military and were treated by Beechcraft and the FAA as a separate series, the A200 series. A significant minority of military versions are known purely by their military designations, with no FAA model designations being assigned to them, although they do have basically equivalent civilian model counterparts. The military designation varies from service to service, but most are called C-12 Huron or UC-12. These are used for personnel transport. The Army also operates the RC-12 Guardrail series of aircraft for military intelligence missions.

The Canadian Forces Air Command (Note: In 1968, the Royal Canadian Air Force (RCAF) was consolidated into the unified Canadian Armed Forces (CAF) as Air Command. In 2011, the RCAF name was restored, although the unified command structure of the CAF did not change.) took delivery of two second-hand early-production Model 200 Super King Airs leased from Awood Air in 1990. These were given the designation CT-145 under the CF's identification system and were used as multi-engine trainers, replacing Douglas C-47s. One was subsequently returned to the lessor and a third Model 200 placed into service in order that the two aircraft used would have the same cockpit layout. The two aircraft were replaced by eight civilian-operated 90 Model King Airs in 1995. In 2025 the Royal Canadian Air Force announced the acquisition of 7 King Air 260 aircraft. Designated the CT-145E Expeditor II, the aircraft will be used as multi-engine trainers based at 3 Canadian Forces Flying Training School in Southport, Manitoba.

The King Air B200 entered service with the Royal Air Force (RAF) in 2004 as a multi-engine trainer, replacing the Jetstream T1.

The Royal Malaysian Air Force operates four B200T variants equipped with tactical command system, master search radar and forward looking infrared system.

The United States Navy awarded a contract to Beechcraft for 10 modified King Air 260 aircraft to replace the King Air H90-based T-44 Pegasus as its primary multi-engine trainer, with options to purchase up to 64 airframes. Designated as the T-54A Marlin II, the first examples were delivered on April 22, 2024, with deliveries expected to take place until 2026.

=== PD 290 ===
Beechcraft considered a jet-powered version in the mid-1970s. The first prototype King Air 200 was re-engined with Pratt & Whitney Canada JT15D turbofans in overwing nacelles. Given the designation PD (Preliminary Design) 290, the aircraft was flown in this configuration for the first time on March 12, 1975. Beech did not pursue production, and the last flight was made on September 30, 1977.

=== Super King Air 300/350 ===
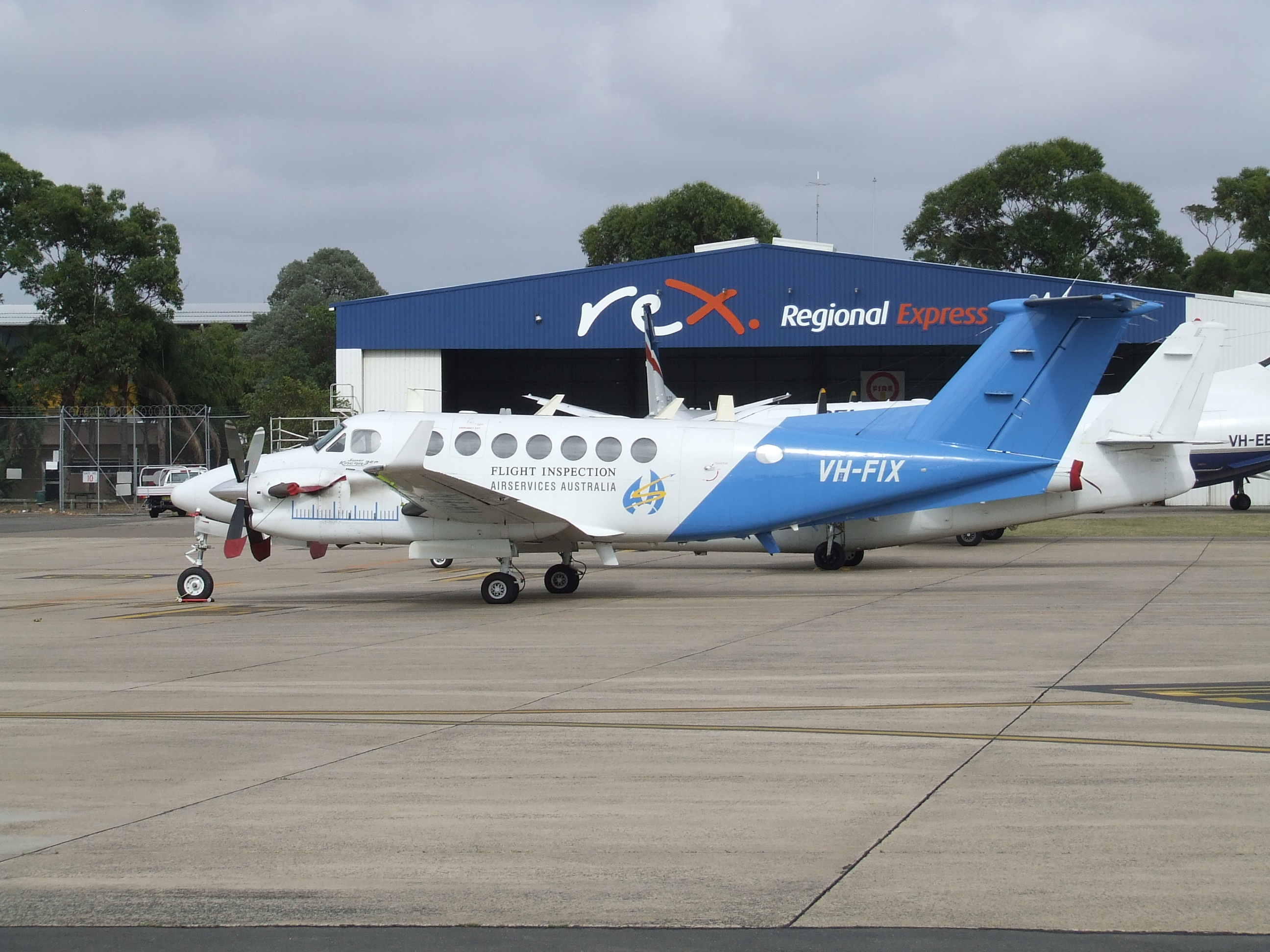
King Air 350 operated by AeroPearl, used for checking navaids in Australia on behalf of Airservices Australia

The 200 series proved so popular that Beechcraft began work on a successor, with the Beechcraft designation Model 300 and marketed as the "Super King Air 300". The B200's airframe was "cleaned up" and more powerful engines (PT6A-60A, rated at 1,050 shp (780 kW)) were installed in redesigned cowlings (known as "pitot cowlings" due to the reshaped engine air intakes), with MTOW increased to 14,000 lb (6,400 kg). A Model 200 (c/no. BB-343) was modified to develop the updated systems to be used on the new model and flew in this configuration on October 6, 1981. The first flight of the prototype Model 300 took place on September 3, 1983, and deliveries commenced the following year. Because not all nations would then allow an aircraft of this type to be certified at an MTOW greater than 12,500 lb (5,700 kg), the Model 300LW was also developed at the same time, limited to the lower MTOW. Nineteen examples of a special version of the Model 300 were delivered to the FAA in 1987 and 1988. The first two were conversions of standard Model 300s, while the remaining 17 were purpose-built; since they were delivered the FAA has used the fleet to check the extensive network of navaids in the United States. 200 and 300 Series King Airs have been used for similar duties in several other countries or regions, including Australia, Germany, Hong Kong (a B200C used for navaid calibration was the first aircraft to land at the then-new Chek Lap Kok Airport in 1996), Norway, Sweden and Taiwan.

The King Air 350 is based on the King Air 300 with a 3.4 ft (1.0 m) span increase and winglets, a 2.9 ft (0.88 m) fuselage stretch for an over 17 ft (5.2 m) main cabin, long enough for double club seating. By 1988, Beechcraft had begun work on the replacement for the 300, it was introduced in 1990 and initially marketed as the Super King Air 350. It has two extra cabin windows on each side and MTOW was increased again to 15,000 lb (6,800 kg); as the same regulatory situation that led to the development of the 300LW still existed, that model continued to be produced until 1994. Like the 200 and B200 before it, a version with a large cargo door was developed, the Model B300C marketed as the "Super King Air 350C". The first deliveries of this model also took place in 1990. In 1998, the UltraQuiet active noise canceling system, made by Elliott Aviation, was added as standard equipment on all B300s. In October 2003, Beechcraft announced that it would deliver future B300 and B300C King Airs with the Rockwell Collins Pro Line 21 avionics suite.

The B300 model is still in production today (now marketed simply as the "King Air 350", the "Super" being dropped in 1996 as mentioned earlier), while the B300C is available for order; four were built in 2007 and Hawker Beechcraft announced on November 11, 2007, that it would deliver five to Saudi Arabia in 2008 for use as air ambulances.

On June 13, 2005, Beechcraft announced at the Paris Air Show that it was developing the King Air 350ER version of the B300, an equivalent to the earlier Model 200T and B200Ts of the 200 series. Changes include an increase of MTOW to 16,500 lb (7,430 kg), provision for surveillance equipment in a belly pod, the landing gear of the Beechcraft 1900 to handle the increased weight and provide ground clearance for the belly pod, and extra fuel capacity in the engine nacelles to increase range (because of the B300s winglets, it was unfeasible to fit wingtip fuel tanks as found on the 200T and B200T). On November 11, 2007, Hawker Beechcraft announced that the 350ER had been certified by the FAA.

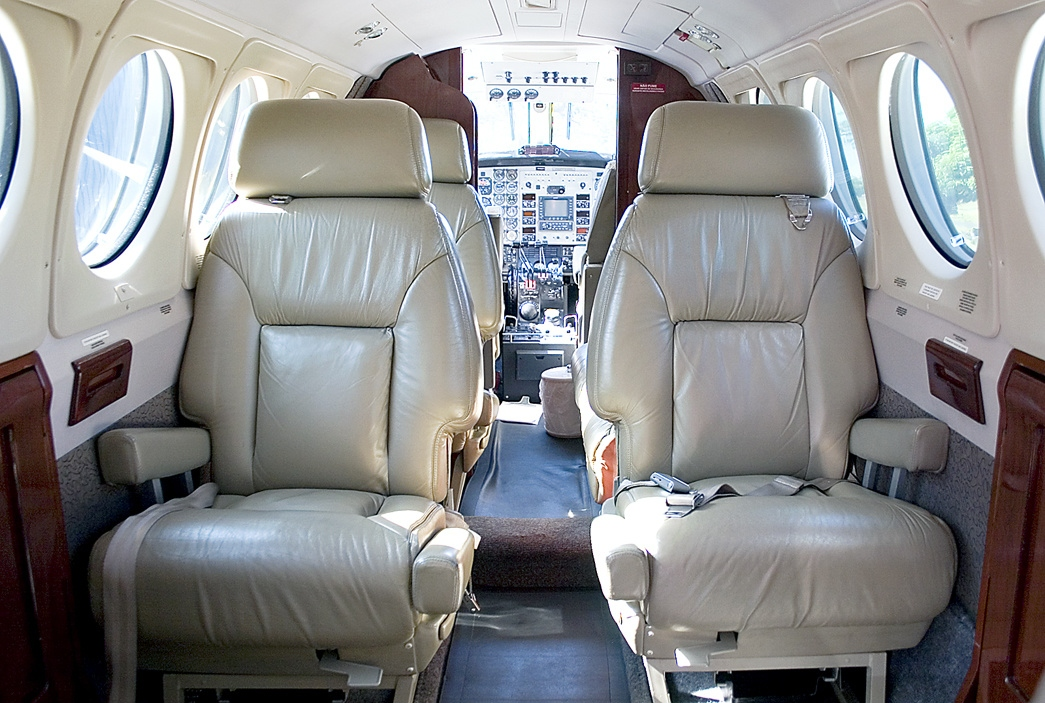
Super King Air cabin

==== King Air 350i ====
In October 2008, Beechcraft announced updated versions of the B300 series, the King Air 350i, with improvements to the passenger cabin. The manufacturer claims that the noise level and overall comfort of the King Air 350i, 350iER, 350iC and 350iCER are now competitive with those of light jets. The cabin of the B300 series has been updated with controllers in the passenger seat armrests that dim the LED lights, darken the windows and control an iPod dock and a high-definition video monitor. The cabin also includes Universal Serial Bus (USB) ports, AC electrical receptacles and fold-out tables for each passenger in the eight seats fitted. Deliveries commenced in December 2009.

The cabin sound level is reduced by 4 dB to 78-dB due to better insulation. More than 440 350i have been delivered in less than ten years. On a one hour trip, it is 10-15 min slower than a jet while burning 700–900 lb (320–410 kg) less fuel. It cruises at 292 kn (336 mph; 541 km/h) TAS at FL350 while burning 503 lb (228 kg) per h, and can reach 312 kn (359 mph; 578 km/h) TAS at FL240. The $1.8 million Blackhawk PT6A-67A upgrade offers a 68 kn (78 mph; 126 km/h) TAS faster cruise and up to 60% shorter time to climb.

Direct operating costs are around $1,300-1,500 per hour, including a 900 lb (410 kg) average fuel flow per h. At 3,600 h, the first pair of engine overhauls cost $500,000-550,000, but second overhauls can cost $800,000-1.2 million. By September 2019, second-hand aircraft were priced between $3 million for early models to more than $4 million for late models. In 2019, the King Air 350i price was US$7.755M, and US$8.8M for the King Air 350iER.

==== Model 300 military variants ====
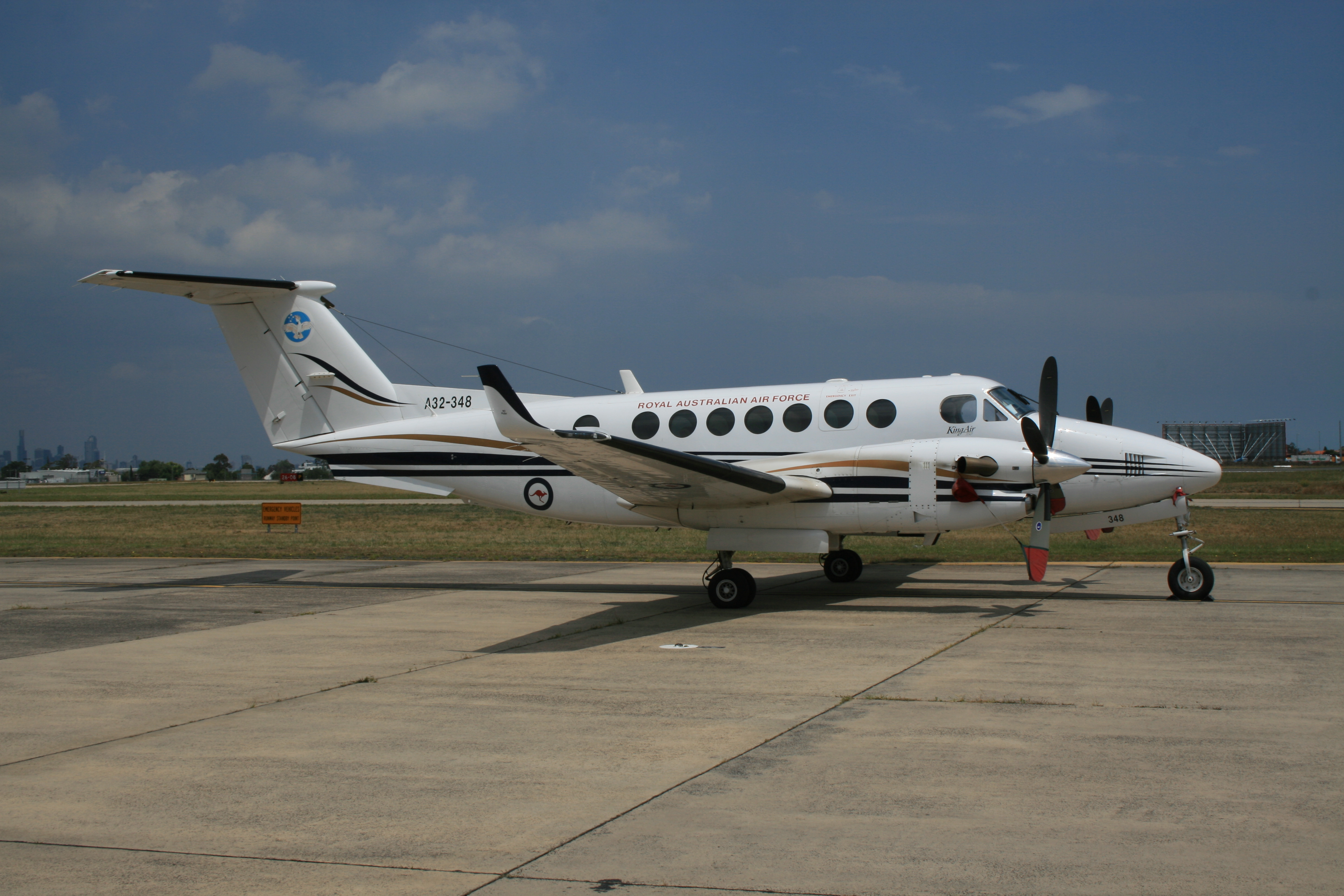
One of eight King Air 350s in service with No. 32 Squadron RAAF

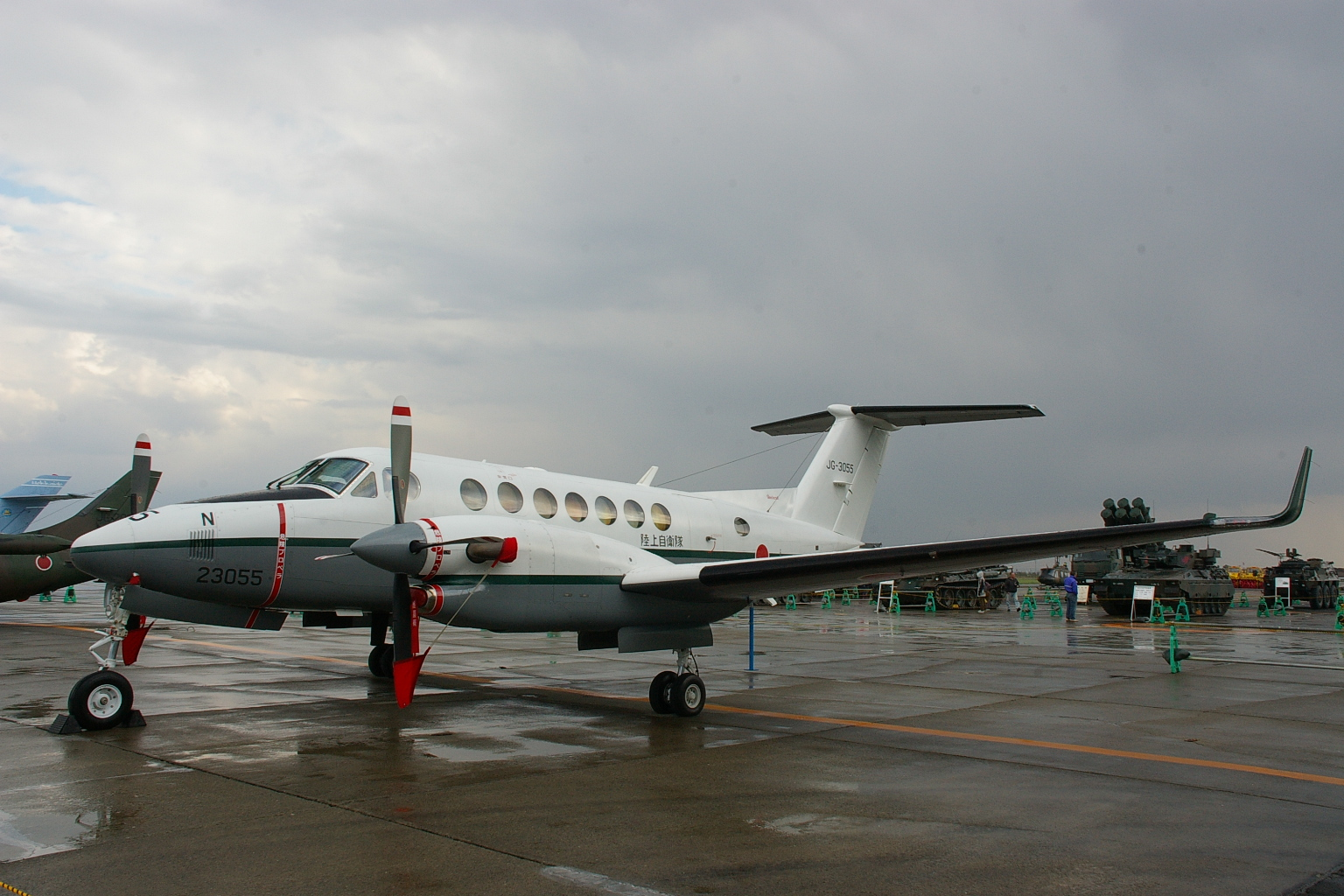
Japan Ground Self-Defense Force LR-2

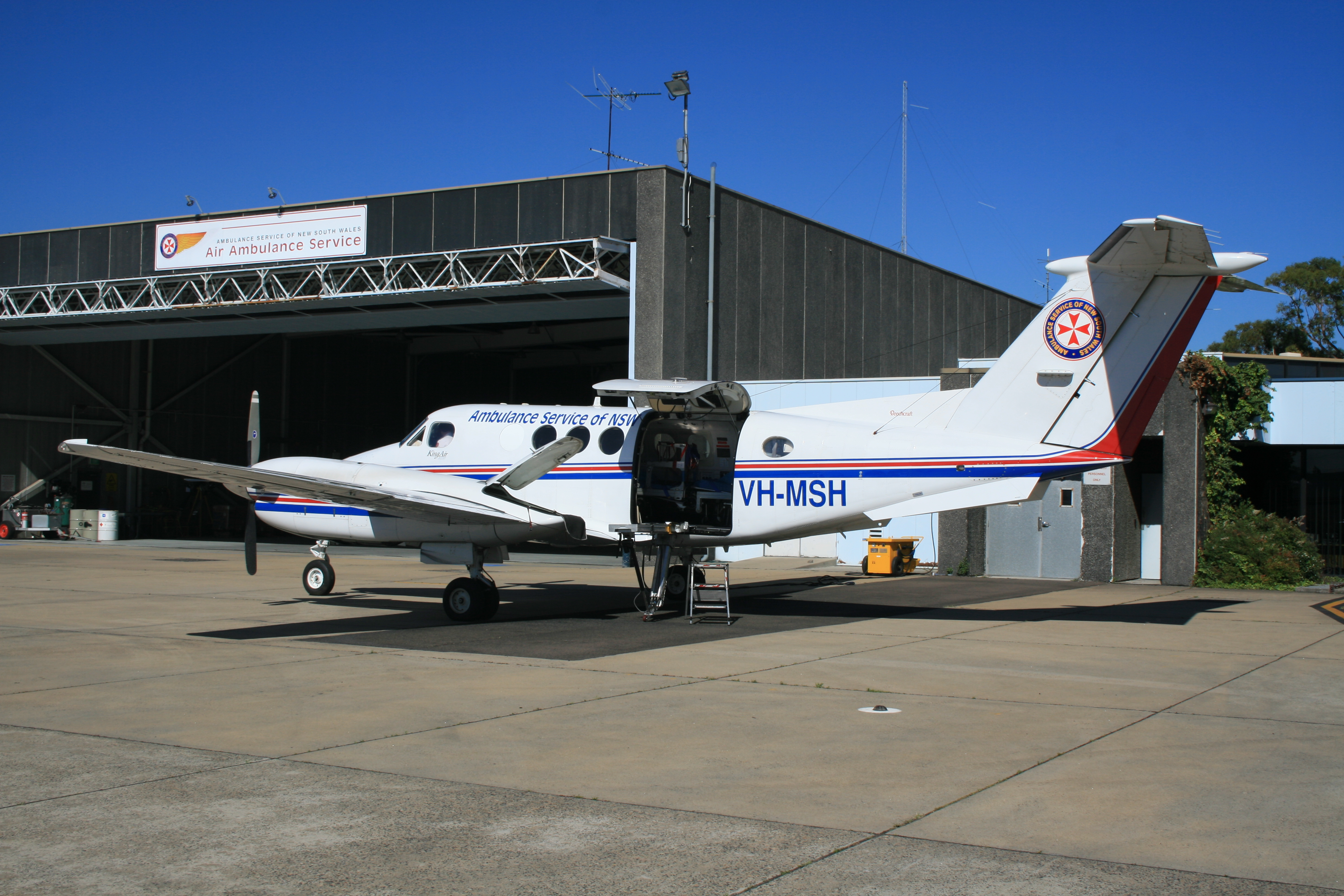
B200 modified as Air Ambulance with large B200C-style door, stretcher lifter and wing lockers

One special Super King Air B300C variant was built for the Swiss Air Force, with a modified belly to allow for aerial photography and a large observation window in the right side aft fuselage; and given a c/no. with a different prefix to other B300Cs.

The Hawker Pacific aviation company of Australia purchased eight B300s between 2003 and 2005 for lease to the Royal Australian Air Force (RAAF), which were subsequently modified as navigator trainers. Hawker Pacific later leased another three B300s to the Australian Army, replacing B200 and B200C Model King Airs. The RAAF has also utilized King Air 350 Special Mission as an interim replacement for the DHC-4 Caribou transports of No. 38 Squadron. The RAAF now operates 16 aircraft from both No. 32 Squadron and No. 38 Squadron.

The Japan Ground Self-Defense Force operates nine B300s, designated LR-2, in the reconnaissance and communications roles. The aircraft were delivered between 1998 and 2004 and include the last B300 built without the Pro Line 21 avionics package (c/no. FL-382).

The Royal Bahamas Defence Force operated (retired as of 2026) a single B300 on maritime patrol and reconnaissance duties.

Beechcraft announced on March 6, 2007, that the Iraqi Air Force had ordered five King Air 350ERs for delivery commencing late in 2007. Hawker Beechcraft exhibited a King Air 350ER at the 2007 Paris Air Show; and at the Royal International Air Tattoo the following month. Photos of the aircraft, which were modified 2005-built B300, showed visual features of the King Air 350ER including a belly pod, and enlarged engine nacelles compared to the nacelles of standard B300 King Airs.

The United States Army has contracted for a number of King Air 300s to be acquired on the second-hand market and modified as ISTAR aircraft for use by Task Force ODIN in operational theaters. As of late 2010, 11 such aircraft are registered to the U.S. Army. Two Canadian-registered and owned King Air 300s, configured in the same manner have also been contracted for.

==== Model 350ER (Extended Range) ====
The Model 350 ER is an extended-range, special-mission version for surveillance and reconnaissance operations; it was introduced at the Paris Air Show in June 2005. Features of this model include engine nacelle fuel tanks, heavy duty landing gear, and an increased maximum take-off weight of 7,484 kg (16,500 lb). The typical mission profile involves a 100 nautical mile (185 km; 115 mile) flight to on-station; a low-altitude surveillance sortie for 7 hours 20 minutes; and return to base with 45 minutes' fuel reserve.

By early 2010, Hawker Beechcraft was offering a structured program of upgrades for the King Air 350ERISR. Accommodations include two pilots above an armored floor; a sensor operator console (port, forward facing) providing on-board analysis; club-four seating in the center section with a port side table; satellite telephone; refreshment center; and a lavatory at the rear.

Four King Air 350CERs (Shadow R1 in RAF service,) equipped for intelligence, surveillance, target acquisition and reconnaissance (ISTAR) missions over Afghanistan, were originally ordered for the RAF. This was later increased to six aircraft in July 2013. Four more King Air 350s replaced the Royal Navy's Jetstream T2 observer trainers in 2011 and were designated Avenger T1. In November 2025, the United Kingdom cancelled an upgrade program for Shadow R1 citing cost overruns, delays and failure to fulfil performance requirements.

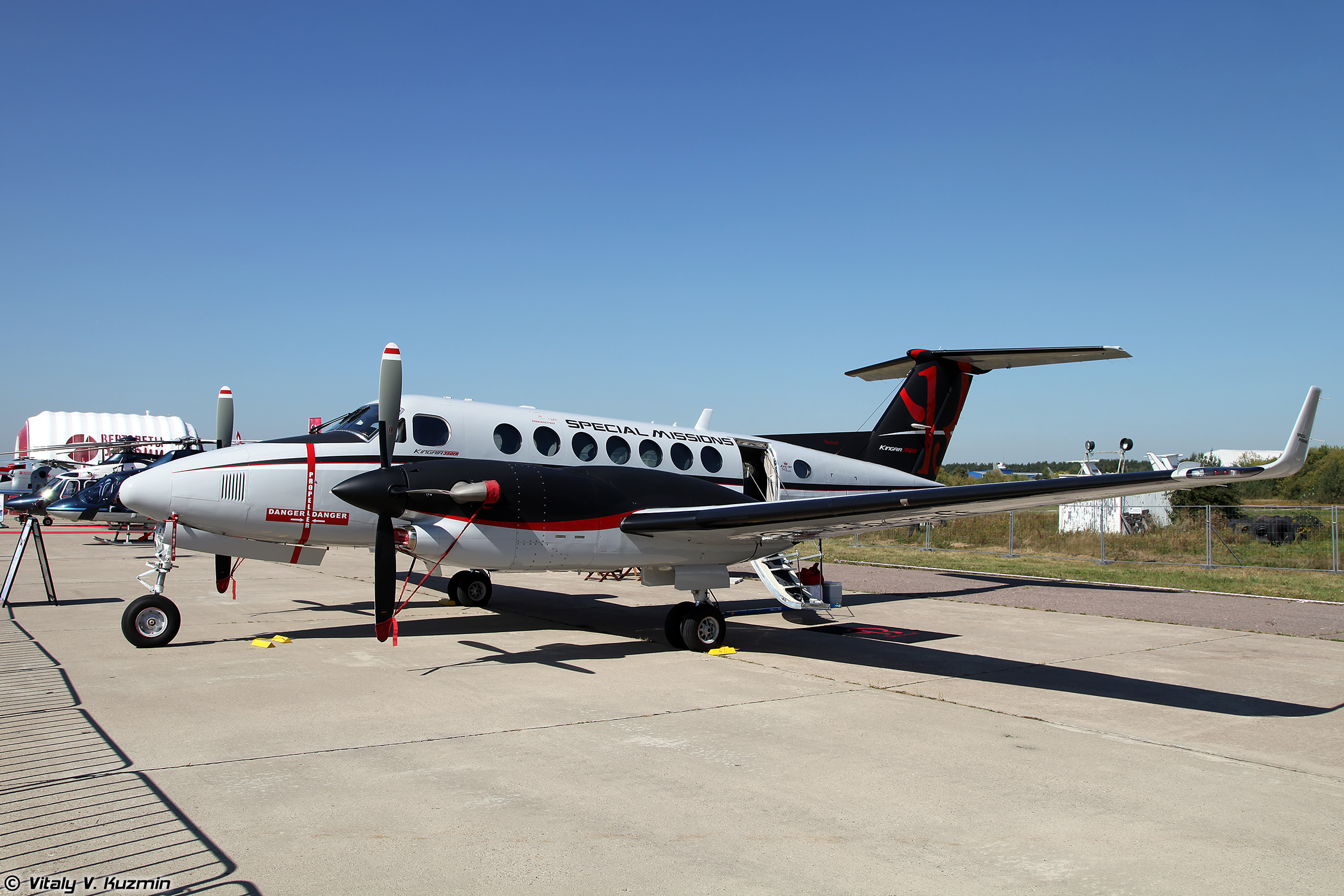
Beechcraft King Air 350 Special Mission at Russia's International Aviation and Space Salon MAKS-2015

On October 3, 2018, the US State Department approved the possible foreign military sale of three King Air 350ERs to the government of Canada for an estimated cost of US$300 million (~$378 million in 2025). The Canadian 350ERs are expected to come with customer-unique modifications for intelligence, surveillance, and reconnaissance (ISR) operations. Canada intends to use the aircraft to improve the ability of its Special Operations Forces Command (CANSOFCOM) to meet current and future threats, strengthen its homeland defense and the combined defense of North America, and support coalition partners overseas.

==== King Air 360 and 360ER ====
The King Air 360 and 360ER have a cockpit including an avionics upgrade, digital pressurisation control, autothrottle, and a modernized cabin featuring a 10% lower altitude pressure. The 360 has a maximum range of 1,806 nmi (3,345 km,) while the 360ER has a maximum range of 2,539 nmi (4,702 km). Both models were FAA type certified in October 2020 and European Aviation Safety Agency certified in September 2021.

In 2023, the equipped price was $9.255M for the 360 and $9.76M for the 360ER.

=== Modification and upgrade programs ===
Numerous aftermarket modifications and upgrades are available for 200 and 300 series King Airs. This includes wing spar reinforcement, electrohydraulic landing gear retraction, and modifications to improve wing performance, reduce propeller noise, increase storage, and improve flotation.

A modification to install a forward looking infrared camera in an extended nose in B200 King Airs is available. Other modifications available are to convert standard 200 Series King Airs to configurations equivalent to the Model 1300 or Model 200C and B200C King Airs; and to modify B300s (typically delivered with an eight-seat corporate interior) to allow more passengers and baggage to be carried.

== Operational history ==
The 6,000th King Air was delivered on January 24, 2005.

Australia's Royal Flying Doctor Service (RFDS) operates 34 King Air B200/B200C and B300C.

Retired military King Airs have entered civil service with United States law enforcement and other government organizations such as State Police and Sheriff Department.

It was intended to be replaced by the unusually designed Beechcraft Starship but only 53 were produced, ending in 1995, while the King Air continues to sell.

More than 1,800 King Air 200 series have been delivered during more than 40 years of production. In early 2017 a used 2011 model King Air 250 was worth US$3 million and a late 2015 to early 2016 model was worth US$5 million, with an annual utilization estimated at 240 hours and 216 cycles, while a King Air 350i is US$800,000 to US$1 million more.

By April 2017 sales of the King Air series were in decline with just 12 examples delivered in the first quarter of the year, compared to 26 in the same period of 2016, due to a weak international market for the design. The company expected the annual sales to be about the same as 2016, though, which totaled 106 in that year.

By December 2020, nearly 7,600 King Air had been delivered, as the fleet surpassed 62 million flight hours in 56 years.

== Variants ==
In roughly chronological order, the 200 and 300 Series King Air variants and production numbers are:

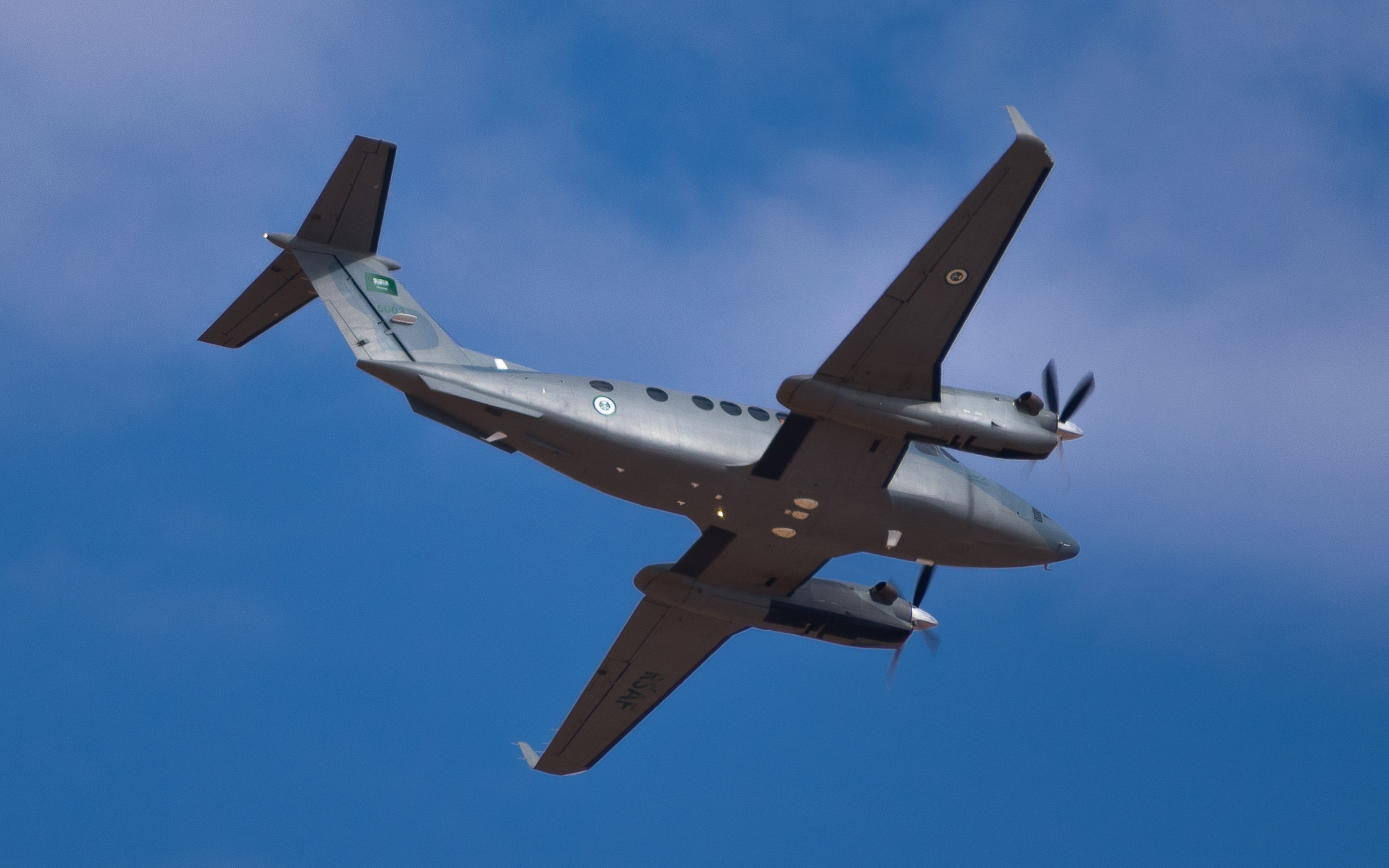
Royal Saudi Air Force King Air 350ER

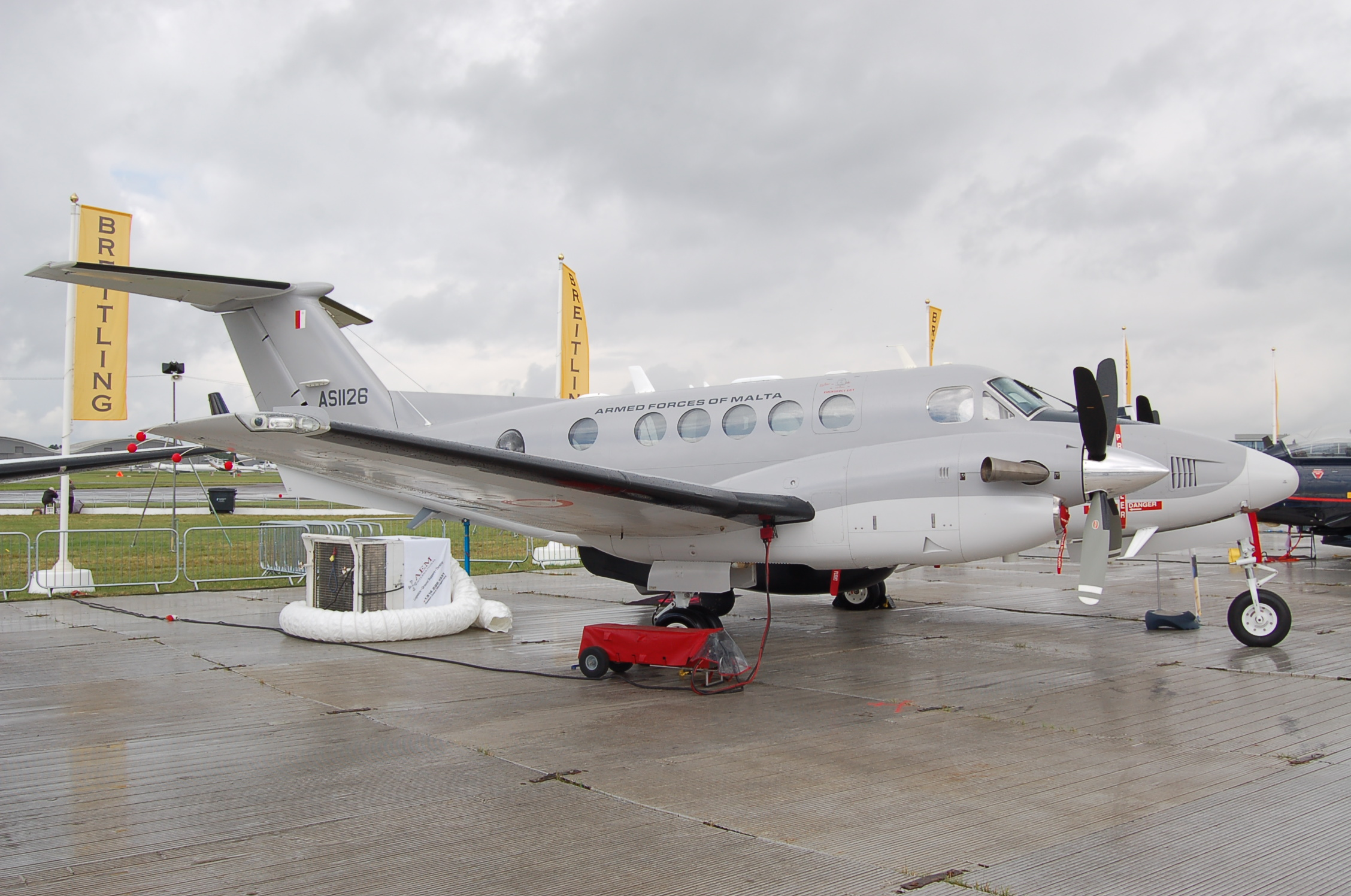
A Maltese King Air 200 used for maritime surveillance

Model 200
Prototypes and initial production version, 858 built including those converted to Model 200Ts; first prototype was converted to PD 290 jet aircraft and first three production aircraft were delivered to U.S. Army as Model A100-1s.
Model A200
First model purpose-built for U.S. military (Army and Air Force), 75 built.
Model 200T
Version with optional wingtip fuel tanks, optional dome-shaped side windows in the rear fuselage, and modified belly to allow aerial photography. Prototype and subsequent aircraft converted from Model 200s and re-serialled; 23 delivered.
Model A200C
Second military model built for U.S. Navy and USMC with cargo door in LH rear fuselage, 90 built.
Model 200C
Civil equivalent to A200C, 36 built.
Model A200CT
Third military model, built for U.S. Army with cargo door and wingtip fuel tanks of Model 200T, 93 built.
Model 200CT
Civil equivalent to A200CT; one aircraft converted from Model 200C.

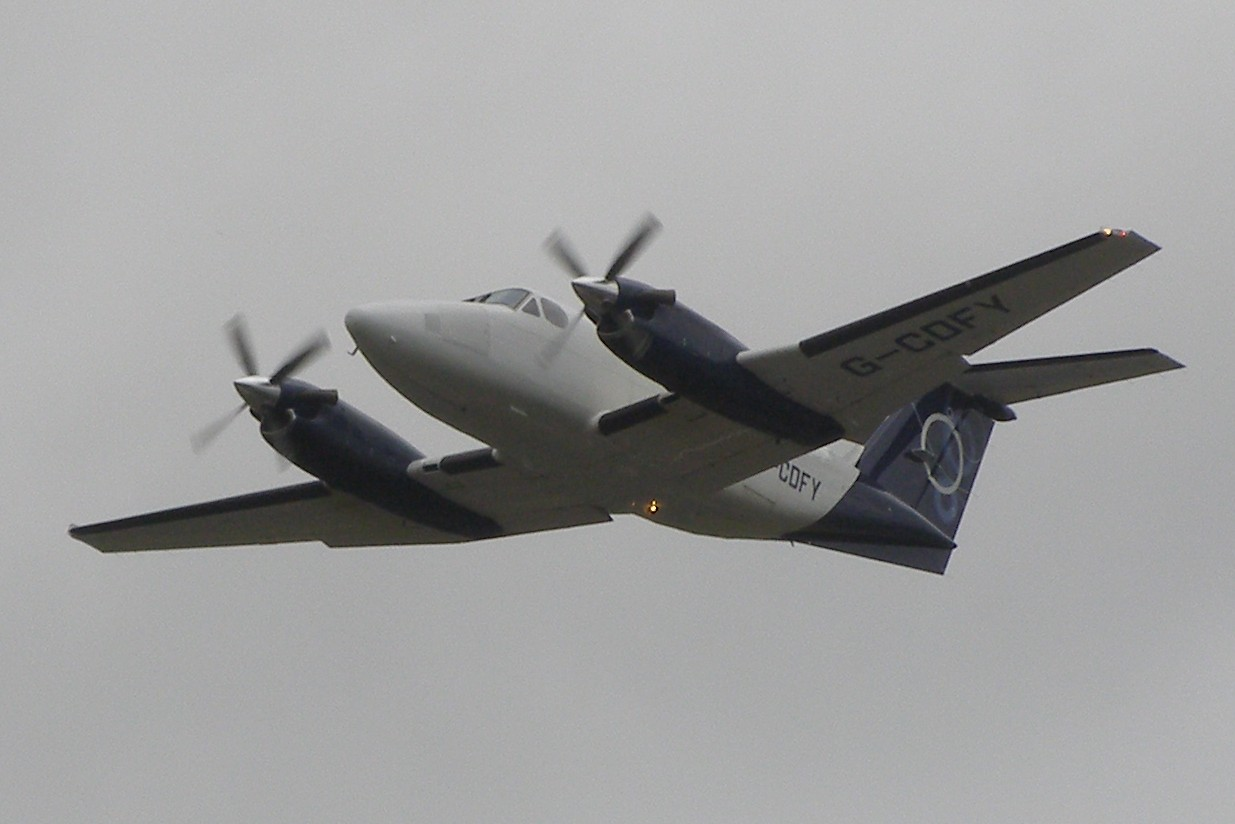
King Air B200

Model B200
Current baseline production model; updated version of Model 200. 1,157 built as of the end of 2009 including those converted to Model B200Ts. 12 aircraft delivered as Model 1300s. Later models fitted with Pro Line 21 avionics
Model B200C
Version of B200 with cargo door, available to order; 112 built as of the end of 2009, of which 47 were built for the United States Air Force as C-12Fs. Later models fitted with Pro Line 21 avionics. A total of 65 other aircraft, similar in specification to the B200C, were built for the U.S. military.
Model B200T
Version of B200 similar to Model 200T; aircraft converted from Model B200s and re-serialled. 23 delivered.
Model B200CT
Version of B200C with wingtip fuel tanks; all aircraft converted from B200Cs and re-serialled. Eight delivered, to the Marina de Guerra del Perú and Israeli Air Force. Another two similar aircraft built for the Israeli Air Force are without an official designation.
Model B200 (marketed as King Air 250)
Includes new Hartzell composite scimitar propellers and third-party winglets and Ram Air Recovery System; can operate from shorter runways than the B200GT.
Model B200GT
Updated version of B200; current civil production model. A total of 97 are built as of the end of 2009.
Model B200CGT
Updated version of B200C; at least one built in 2016. Operated by Can-West Corporate Air Charters as of 2019.
Model 300
Two versions, the standard Model 300 with increased MTOW of 14,000 lb (6,300 kg) and the Model 300LW with MTOW limited to 12,500 lb (5,700 kg) to meet the aviation regulatory requirements of various countries; 247 built including 35 Model 300LW and including two Model 300s modified and another 17 built specifically for the FAA for use in navaid calibration. The 300LW has a lower certified Take-Off Gross Weight of 12,500 lb for the European market related to tax.

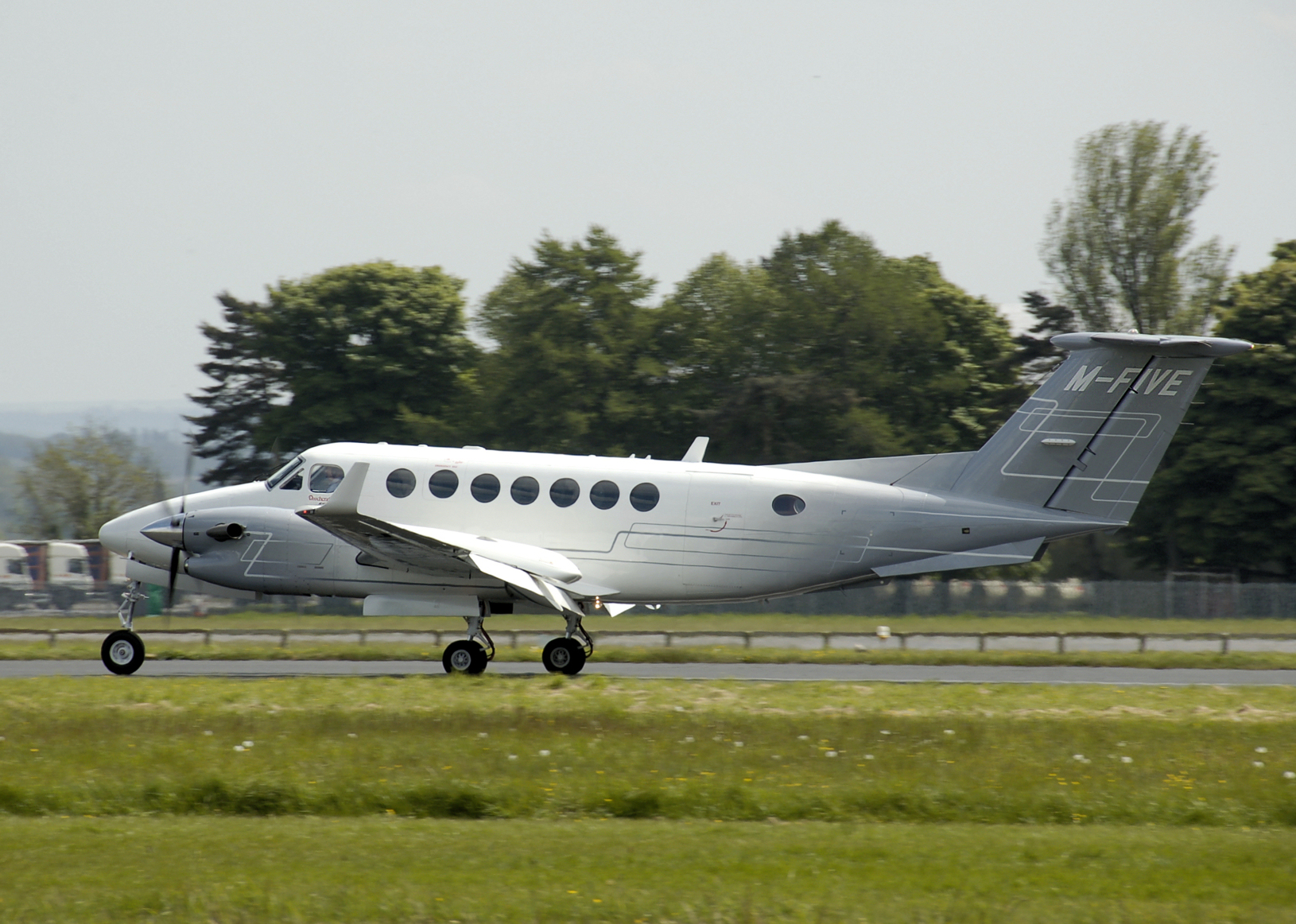
B300 Super King Air 350, taken 2009

Model B300 (marketed as King Air 350)
Stretched model with two extra cabin windows each side of forward fuselage and winglets on wingtips; in production as King Air 350i and King Air 350iER. 687 built as of the end of 2009, including 42 extended range versions delivered as 350ERs. Later aircraft fitted with Pro Line 21 avionics.
Model B300C (marketed as King Air 350C)
Version of B300 with cargo door; available for order as 350iC and 350iCER. 35 built as of the end of 2009 including one for the Swiss Air Force with modifications for aerial surveillance and five aircraft modified prior to delivery with underwing hardpoints and delivered as 350CERs. Later aircraft fitted with Pro Line 21 avionics.
Model B300 (marketed as King Air 350i)
Updated version of B300 with interior upgrade; certified in December 2009.
Model 1300 Commuter
B200 configured as a regional airliner, with room for two crew and 13 passengers, fitted with two overwing emergency exits instead of the standard model's single overwing exit and an optional 455 lb (206 kg) belly cargo pod; a nose baggage compartment provided by relocating avionics from the nose to elsewhere in the aircraft. A total of 14 were built.
Blackhawk XP67A
Re-engined with PT6A-67As and five-blade composite propellers instead of the PT6A-60A engines with unit power increasing from 1,050 to 1,200 hp (780 to 890 kW), boosting the maximum cruise speed by 50 kn (58 mph; 93 km/h) to 340 kn (390 mph; 630 km/h) and capable of climbing to 35,000ft in 19min; Blackhawk targets 30% of the 850 King Air 300 globally.

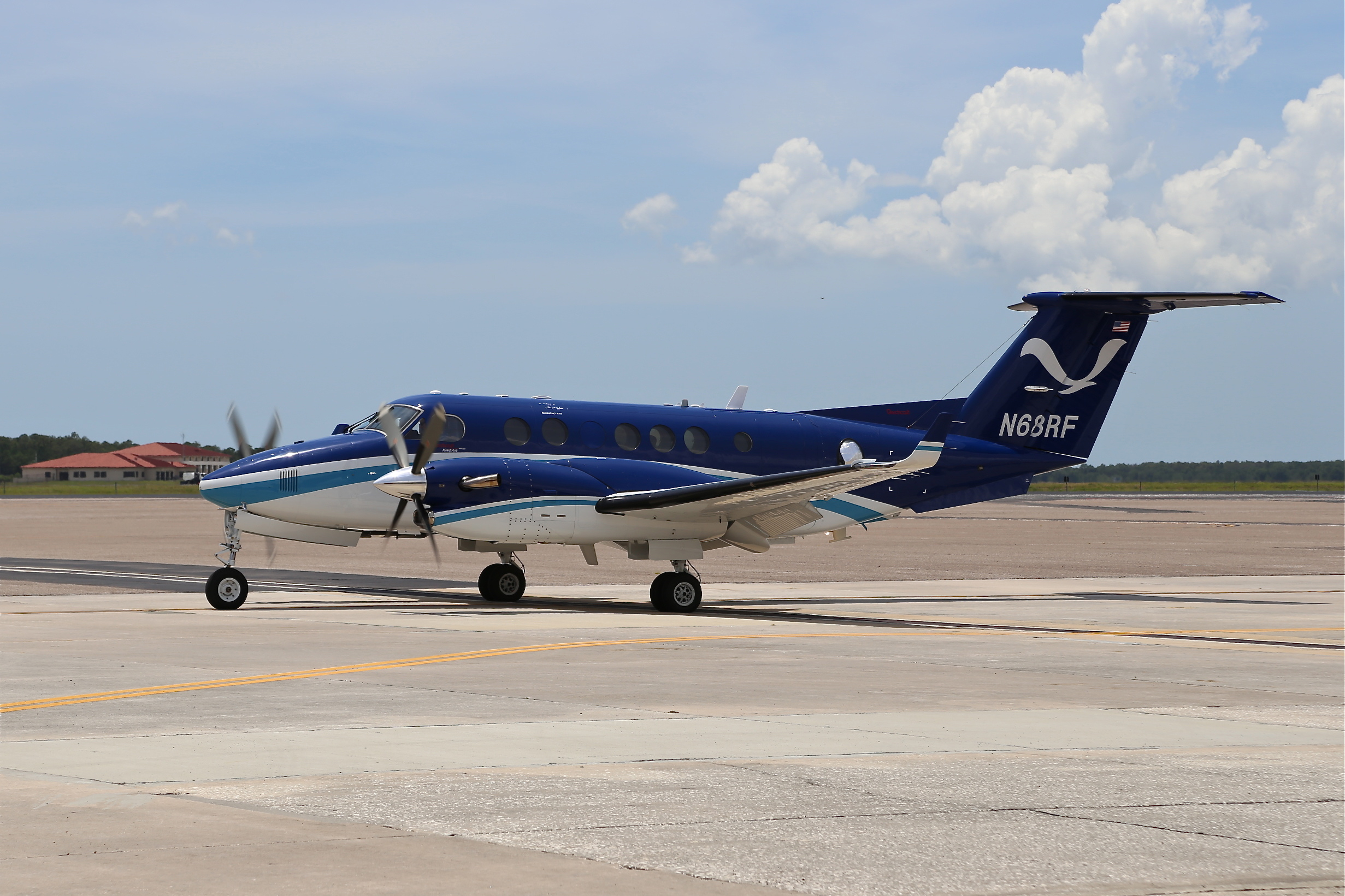
NOAA's Beechcraft King Air 350CER N68RF prepares for takeoff.

Model 350CER
Used by the National Oceanic and Atmospheric Administration. Features two large downward-facing sensor ports that can support a wide variety of remote sensing systems, including digital cameras, multispectral and hyperspectral sensors, topographic and bathymetric lidar systems, and gamma radiation detectors.
Model 360 and 360ER
Models introduced in August 2020 with automatic pressurization, autothrottles and a revised interior.
T-54A Marlin II
Military designation given to King Air Model 260 aircraft used by the United States Navy as a multi-engine trainer aircraft.
B.PhTh.5
(Thai: บ.ผท.๕) Royal Thai Armed Forces designation for the Model B200.
CT-145E Expeditor II
Military designation given to King Air Model 260 aircraft used by the Royal Canadian Air Force as a multi-engine trainer aircraft.

== Operators ==
The most widespread turboprop business aircraft in the world, over 7,300 King Airs and Super King Airs have been delivered by May 2018, surpassing 60 million flight hours in commercial, military and special mission roles. They are operated in more than 94 countries. Almost 53% of the aircraft delivered have been from the 200/300 series family.

=== Civil operators ===
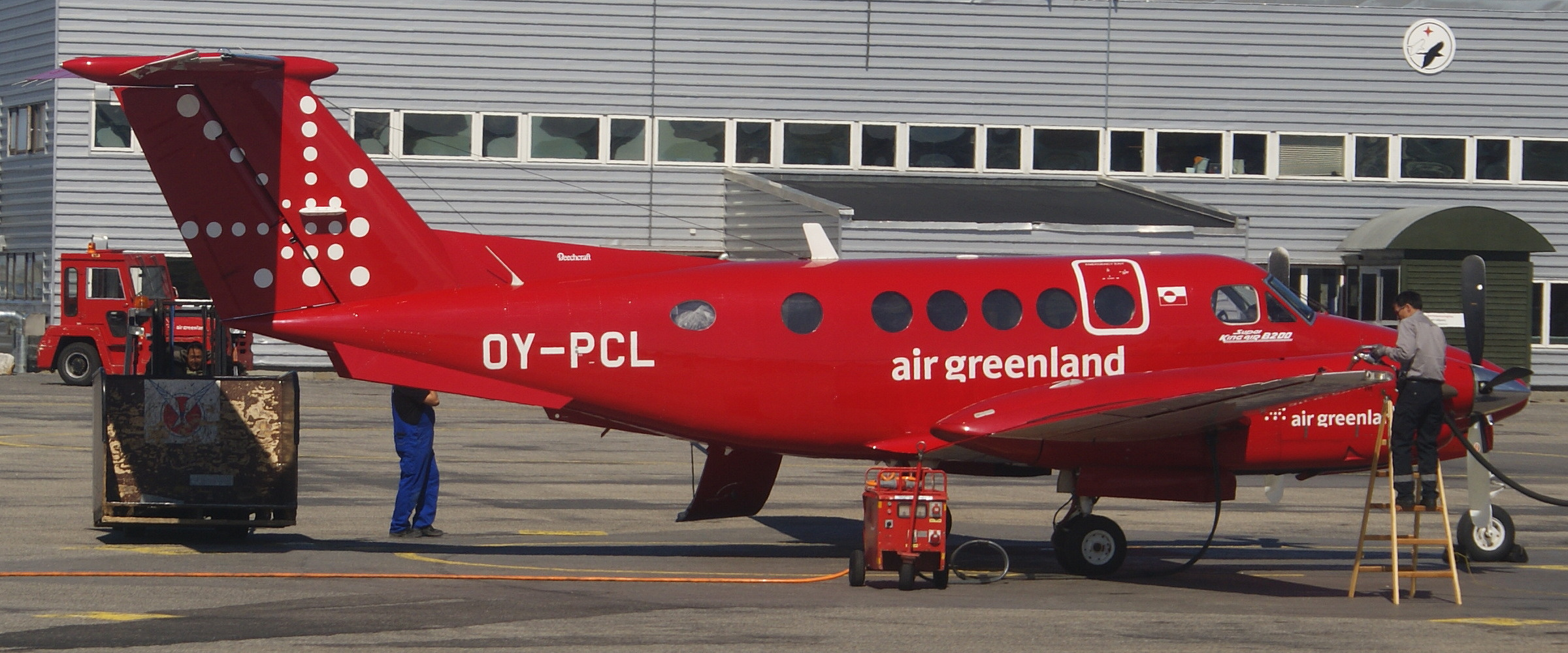
"Amaalik" of Air Greenland

The King Air is used by many corporate and private users, it is also popular as a light transport liaison aircraft with both government and non-government organizations. It is also used by air-taxi, air ambulance, and air charter companies.

== Accidents and incidents ==
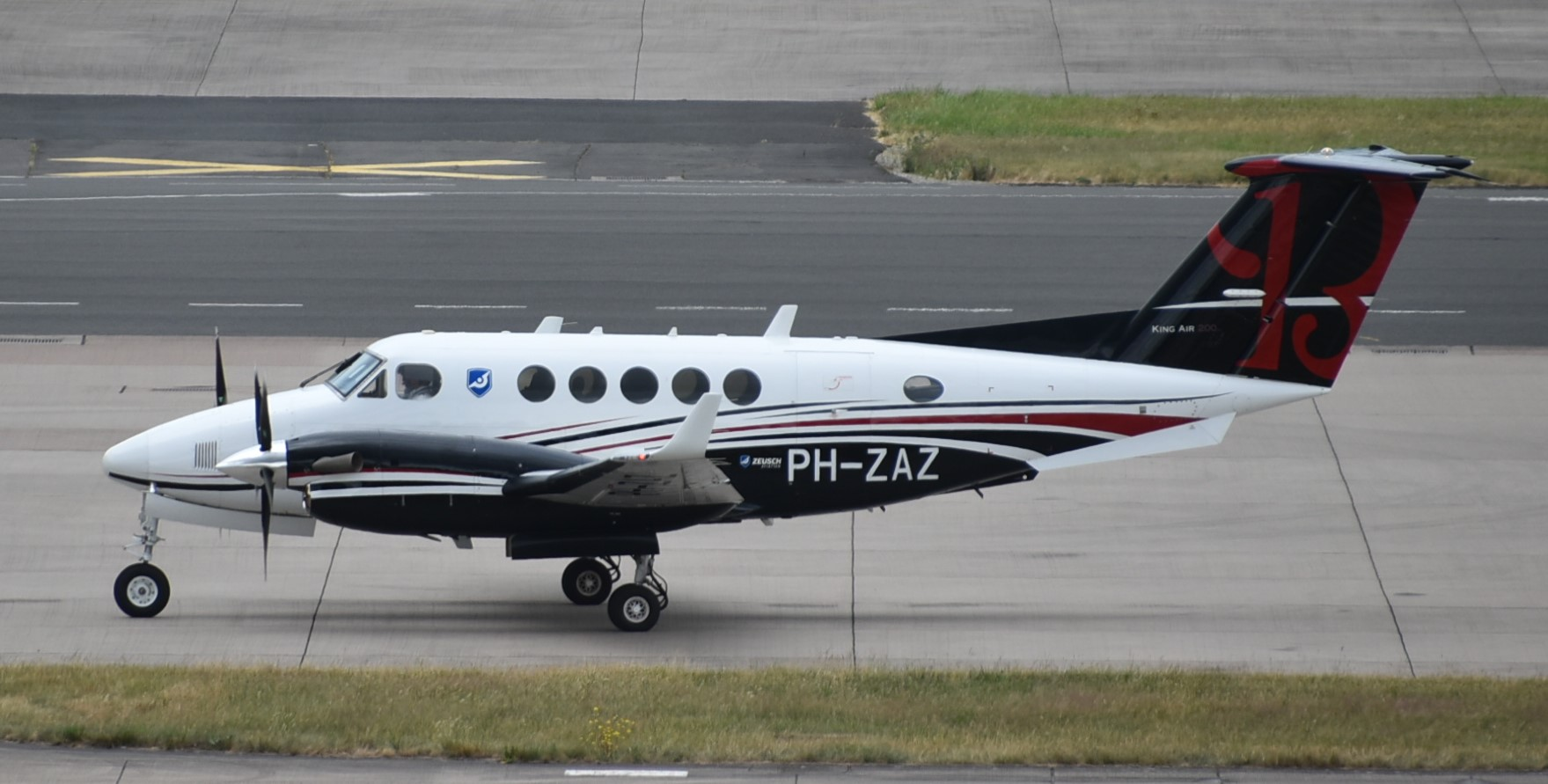
The B200 which crashed on July 13, 2025, photographed at Birmingham Airport

- February 21, 1980: A Model 200 operating as Advance Airlines Flight 4210 crashed adjacent to the runway at Sydney Airport, killing 13 people in the worst civil aviation accident in Australia since 1968.
- May 24, 1981: A Super King Air 200 of the Ecuadorian Air Force flew into a mountain with the loss of all 9 on board including Jaime Roldós Aguilera, the President of Ecuador.
- February 17, 1993: a Turkish Air Force Super King Air B200 transporting Eşref Bitlis (the General Commander of the Turkish Gendarmerie) crashed minutes after taking off from the Güvercinlik Army Air Base in Ankara killing all five on board and one on the ground.
- September 4, 2000: After departing Perth, Western Australia, the pilot of a Model 200 Super King Air failed to respond to ATC after the aircraft climbed above its assigned altitude. It continued to fly across Australia for five hours before crashing near Burketown in northwestern Queensland, killing all eight on board. Dubbed the "Ghost Flight" by the media, an investigation concluded that the occupants likely became incapacitated due to hypoxia.
- January 27, 2001: A Super King Air 200 carrying members of the Oklahoma State University Basketball Team crashed in Colorado, resulting in the deaths of all 10 occupants.
- February 26, 2004: President of the Republic of Macedonia Boris Trajkovski was killed with eight others in the crash near Mostar. The plane was a Beechcraft Model 200 Super King Air (registered Z3-BAB) operated as a transport aircraft of the Government of the Republic of Macedonia.
- October 24, 2004: A Model 200 Super King Air crashed into mountainous terrain during a missed approach in Virginia. Several members of the Hendrick Motorsports team were on board and died in the crash.
- October 11, 2007: A Rio Jur Beechcraft Super King Air impacted the ground after banking right abruptly, passed a hangar, then impacted houses near the approach end of the runway at El Dorado International Airport. All five occupants were killed along with two on the ground.
- August 5, 2013 : A Mýflug Beechcraft B200 Super King Air crashed at the drag strip near Akureyri, Iceland, during an air ambulance flight after a low, steep turn during a flyby request, killing two of the three people on board.
- October 30, 2014: A B200 King Air crashed at Wichita, Kansas. The pilot and three people on the ground were killed; six people were injured.
- December 22, 2015: A B200 King Air crashed at Indira Gandhi International Airport in Delhi, India. All ten occupants were killed; one person on the ground was injured.
- February 21, 2017: A B200 King Air struck the roof of a shopping center building and crashed just after taking off from Essendon Airport in Melbourne, Australia. All five on board were killed.
- July 30, 2019: A Pakistan Army King Air 350i crashed in Rawalpindi, Pakistan, killing all five aboard and thirteen on the ground.
- September 1, 2019: A B300 King Air crashed into a resort in Calamba, Philippines. All nine occupants aboard were killed; two people on the ground were injured.
- May 21, 2021: A King Air 350i Nigerian Air Force crashed near Kaduna International Airport, killing all 11 on board, including Chief of Army Staff Ibrahim Attahiru.
- February 6, 2025: A B350 King Air carrying a United States Marine and three contractors crashed into a ricefield at Ampatuan, Philippines. All four occupants aboard were killed upon impact.
- July 13, 2025: A B200 (PH-ZAZ) operating as Zeusch Aviation Flight 1 crashed on takeoff at London Southend Airport, Southend-on-Sea, England, resulting in 4 fatalities.
- August 5, 2025: A B300 (N534AW) owned by CSI Aviation operating as CSI534/ SANDIA534 medical transport, crashed on approach at Chinle Municipal Airport, resulting in the deaths of both pilots, the flight paramedic and flight nurse.
- December 20, 2025: A Super King Air B200, call sign N479BR owned by Buffalo River Aviation, Fayetteville, Arkansas, was involved in the first known true emergency autonomous autoland incident during a repositioning flight. The aircraft was previously retrofitted with a fully automated emergency autoland system that included control surface, autopilot and radio control. After the pilot became incapacitated from suspected hypoxia, unsafe cabin pressure activated the Autoland system which automatically chose a suitable airport, descended from high altitude and safely landed at Rocky Mountain Metropolitan Airport in Broomfield, Colorado. During the event, the autoland subsystem tuned the radio to proper tower frequency, transmitted computer-enunciated radio messages over the radio announcing pilot incapacitation, aircraft position, and estimated time of arrival to the airport with updates every few minutes to which ground emergency units and air traffic controllers prepared the airport and approach airspace. This marked the first recorded instance of a fully navigated, pilot-incapacitation autoland in U.S. general aviation history.

== Specifications ==
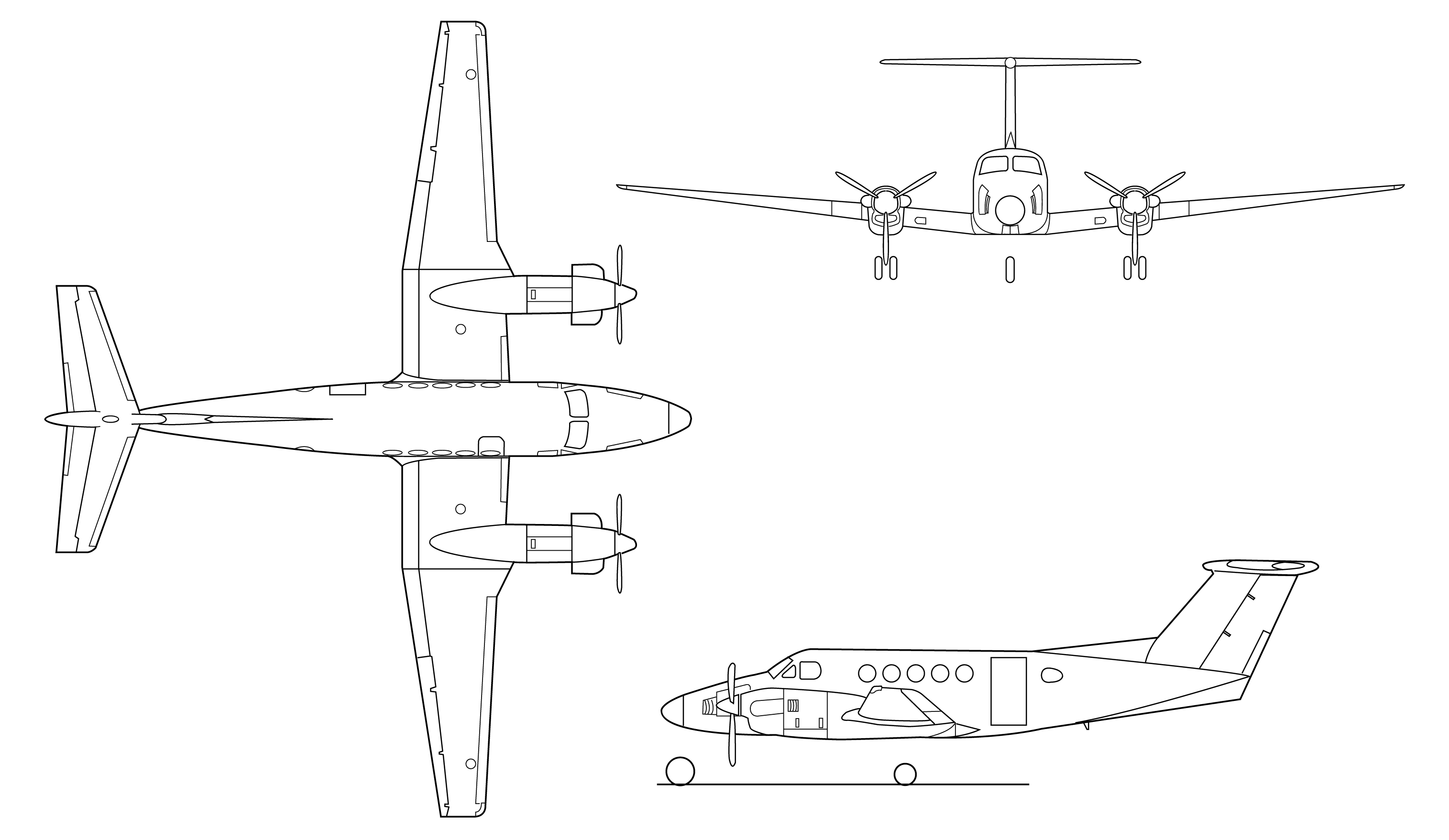
Beechcraft King Air B200

Variant	250	350i	350ER
Crew	1–2		
Capacity	10	11	
Length	43 ft 10 in / 13.36 m	46 ft 8 in / 14.22 m	
Span	57 ft 11 in / 17.65 m		
Height	14 ft 10 in / 4.52 m	14 ft 4 in / 4.37 m	
Cabin L × W × H	16 ft 8 in × 4 ft 6 in × 4 ft 9 in 5.08 m × 1.37 m × 1.45 m	19 ft 6 in × 4 ft 6 in × 4 ft 9 in 5.94 m × 1.37 m × 1.45 m	
MTOW	12,500 lb / 5,670 kg	15,000 lb / 6,804 kg	16,500 lb / 7,484 kg
OEW (Note: with one 200 lb pilot)	8,830 lb / 4,005 kg	9,955 lb / 4,516 kg	9,455 lb / 4,289 kg (Note: without accommodation)
Useful load	3,760 lb / 1,706 kg	5,145 lb / 2,334 kg	7,145 lb / 3,241 kg
Engine type (2×)	PWC PT6A-52	PWC PT6A-60A	
Power or thrust	850 shp / 625 kW	1,050 shp / 783 kW	
Maximum cruise	310 kn / 574 km/h / 357 mph	312 kn / 578 km/h / 359 mph	303 kn / 561 km/h / 348 mph
Ferry range	1,720 nmi / 3,185 km / 1,979 mi	1,806 nmi / 3,345 km / 2,078 mi	2,670 nmi / 4,945 km / 3,072 mi
Takeoff	2,111 ft / 643 m (Note: FAR-23 base model, 12,500 lb MTOW)	350i: 3,300 ft / 1,006 m	4,057 ft / 1,237 m
Ceiling	35,000 ft / 10,668 m		

== See also ==
Related development

- Beechcraft Queen Air
- Beechcraft King Air
- Beechcraft C-12 Huron
- Beechcraft 1900

Aircraft of comparable role, configuration, and era

- Cessna 425
- Cessna 441 Conquest II
- Embraer EMB 121 Xingu
- Evektor EV-55 Outback
- Mitsubishi MU-2
- Piaggio P.180 Avanti
- Pilatus PC-12
- Piper PA-31T Cheyenne

Related lists

- List of active United Kingdom military aircraft
