= Mohajem 92 =

Mohajem 92 UAV
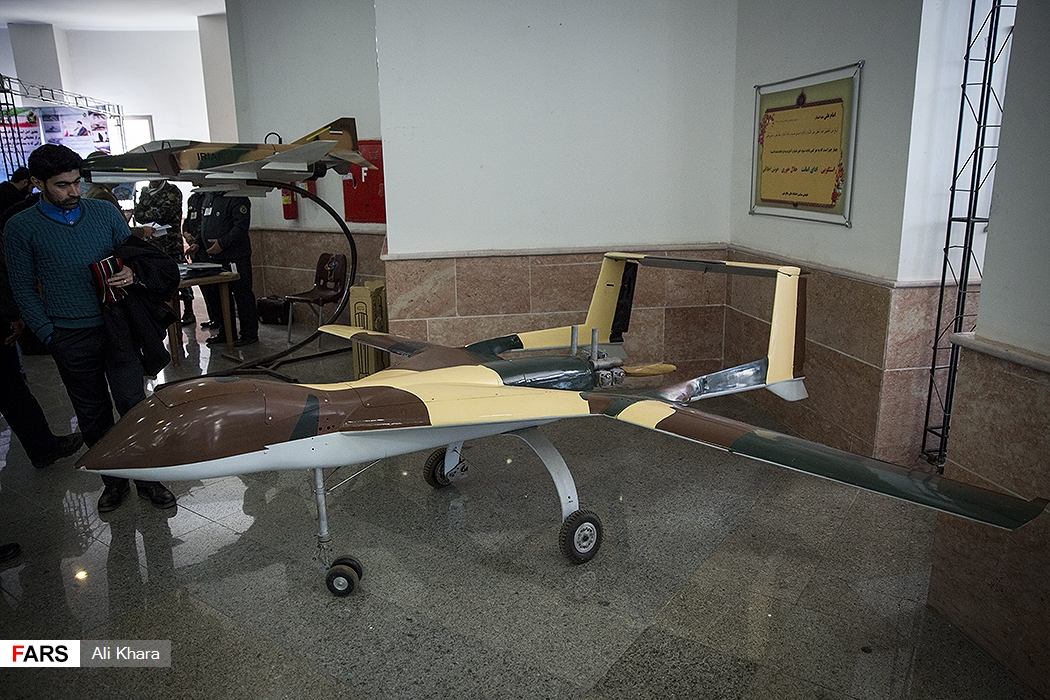
- Iranian drone Mohajem-92

General information
- Type: UAV
- National origin: Iran
- Manufacturer: Army Air Force
- Designer: Research and Self-Sufficiency Jihad Organization
- Status: In service
- Primary user: Iran
- Number built: Not Mentioned

History
- First flight: 23 September 2015 (Was Unveiled)

The Mohajem 92 UAV (Persian: پهپاد مهاجم 92) is an Iranian lightweight, high-speed unmanned aerial vehicle (UAV) developed by the Research and Self-Sufficiency Jihad Organization of the Army Air Force. It was unveiled on September 23, 2015, during the Air Force Achievements and Equipment Exhibition at Shahid Lashkari Base, Mehrabad Airport, Tehran, held in honor of "Sacred Defense Week". Weighing approximately 80 kilograms, the UAV boasts a flight range of 500 kilometers and can carry out continuous patrols within a 100-kilometer radius for up to six hours. It is designed for both reconnaissance and combat missions. At sea level, the Mohajem 92 can reach a maximum speed of 200 km/h, with a cruising speed of about 120 km/h. This combat-reconnaissance drone has successfully undergone missile testing and is also capable of transmitting real-time HD imagery during operations.

In 2019, Israel accused Iran of transferring the technology to produce the Mohajem-92 to Iraq's Technical Directorate for Military Production.
