= 2015 Syrian Air Force An-26 crash =

Aviation accident in Syria

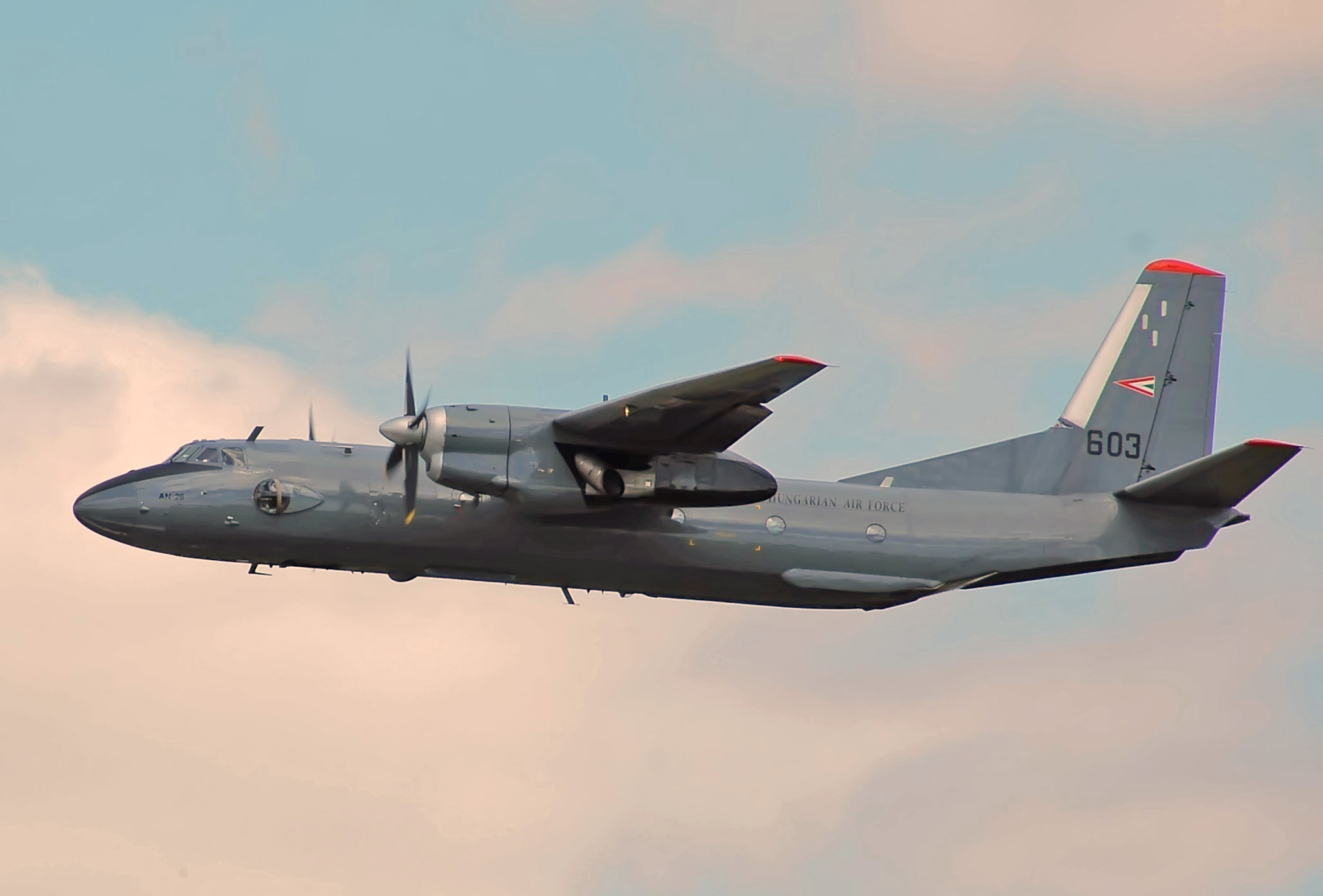
- An Antonov An-26 similar to the aircraft involved

Accident or shootdown
- Date: 18 January 2015
- Summary: Low visibility due to fog
- Site: Abu al-Duhur military airport, Idlib Governorate, Syria; 35°44′1.56″N 37°6′14.08″E

Aircraft
- Aircraft type: Antonov An-26
- Operator: Syrian Air Force
- Registration: YK-AND
- Destination: Abu al-Duhur military airport, Idlib Governorate, Syria
- Occupants: 35
- Passengers: 29
- Crew: 6
- Fatalities: 35
- Survivors: 0

On 18 January 2015, an Antonov An-26 operated by the Syrian Air Force crashed with no survivors while attempting to land at the besieged Abu al-Duhur military airport in Idlib Governorate, Syria. The plane was carrying troops as well as military equipment and ammunition. All 35 military personnel on board perished.

== Cause ==
Syrian state media and the SOHR said that the crash was due to heavy fog or "technical issues" and that the plane hit an electricity pylon. However, Al-Qaeda affiliated group Al-Nusra Front claimed that they shot it down.

== Fatalities ==
Syrian media provided a list with the names of the 30 Syrian soldiers who were killed. The commander of the Syrian army division, Colonel Hussein Al-Yousif, was among those listed killed. Per SOHR, 13 Syrian officers were among the fatalities.
