= Arif (given name) =

- Pronunciation: Arabic: [ʕaːrɪf]
- Gender: Male
- Language: South Semitic, Arabic

Origin
- Meaning: "kind, good, smart, knowledgeable and wise"

Other names
- Variant forms: Arif, Aref, Aarif, Aaref
- See also: Arifa, Maarif

Arif, Ariff, Aarif, or Aref is a masculine given name of Arabic origin. Notable people with the name include:

== Given name ==
=== Aarif ===
- Aarif Barma (born 1959), Hong Kong judge
- Aarif Rahman (born 1987), Hong Kong actor, singer, and songwriter
- Aarif Sheikh (born 1997), Nepalese cricketer

=== Aref ===
- Aref (singer) (1941–2026), Iranian singer and actor
- Aref Al Agha (born 1976), Syrian footballer
- Aref Aghasi (born 1997), Iranian footballer
- Aref al-Aref (1892–1973), Palestinian journalist and politician
- Aref Arefkia (born 1940), Iranian singer
- Aref al-Dajani (1856–1930), Palestinian politician
- Aref Thabit Al-Dali (born 1987), Yemeni footballer
- Aref Dalila (born 1942), Syrian economist
- Aref Durvesh, British-Indian musician
- Aref Haji Eydi (born 1999), Iranian footballer
- Aref Ghafouri (born 1989), Turkish-Iranian illusionist
- Aref Gholami (born 1997), Iranian footballer
- Aref Gholampour (born 1999), Iranian footballer
- Aref Gholizadeh (1932–2015), Iranian footballer
- Aref Al-Haj (born 2001), Jordanian footballer
- Aref Khosravinia, Iranian Paralympic athlete
- Aref Lorestani (1972–2017), Iranian actor
- Aref Mohammadi, Iranian-Canadian journalist, film critic, filmmaker, and producer
- Aref Mohammadvand (born 1970), Iranian footballer
- Aref Nasrallah (born 1958), Iraqi Shiite scholar, activist, and philanthropist
- Aref Ali Nayed (born 1962), Libyan Islamic scholar, businessman, and politician
- Aref Qazvini (1882–1934), Iranian poet
- Aref Rayess (1928–2005), Lebanese painter and sculptor
- Aref Rostami (born 1996), Iranian footballer
- Aref Salem, Lebanese-Canadian politician
- Aref al-Shaal, Syrian judge, lawyer, and professor
- Aref Tayfour (born 1945), Iraqi politician

=== Arif ===
- Arif Abdullayev (born 1968), Azerbaijani wrestler
- Arif Acaloğlu (1956–2023), Azerbaijani-Turkish folklorist, Turkologist, anthropologist, translator, and advisor
- Arif Ahmed (cricketer), Bangladeshi cricketer
- Arif Ahmed (philosopher) (born 1974), British philosopher and academic
- Arif Aiman (born 2002), Malaysian footballer
- Arif Akhundov (born 1972), Azerbaijani sprinter
- Arif Alaftargil (born 1973), Turkish alpine skier
- Arif Alasgar (born 1944), Azerbaijani painter
- Arif Ali (1961–2008), Pakistani-British publisher and journalist
- Arif Ali (publisher) (born 1935), British-Guyanese publisher and newspaper proprietor
- Arif Ali-Shah, British film writer, screenplay writer, and Sufi teacher
- Arif Alvi (born 1949), Pakistani politician
- Arif Anis, British-Pakistani leadership consultant and author
- Arif Anwar (born 1995), Malaysian footballer
- Arif Aqueel (1952–2024), Indian politician
- Arif Defri Arianto (born 2002), Indonesian singer
- Arif Ariyanto (born 1985), Indonesian footballer
- Arif Asadov (born 1970), Azerbaijani football coach and player
- Arif Aziz (born 1943), Azerbaijan artist and educator
- Arif Babayev (1928–1983), Azerbaijani film director
- Arif Babayev (singer) (1938–2025), Azerbaijani mugham singer
- Arif Bangash (1935–2019), Pakistan Army officer and politician
- Arif Baytın (1874–1950), Turkish Army officer and politician
- Arif Beg (1935–2016), Indian politician
- Arif Iqbal Bhatti (born 1997), Pakistani jurist
- Arif Masih Bhatti (born 1970), Pakistani politician
- Arif Boşluk (born 2003), Turkish footballer
- Arif Budimanta (1968–2025), Indonesian politician
- Arif Butt (1944–2007), Pakistani cricketer
- Arif Cahyono (born 1975), Indonesian Army officer
- Ariful Haque Choudhury (born 1959), Bangladeshi politician
- Arif Cooper (died 2023), Jamaican musician, music producer, and DJ
- Arif Dashdemirov (born 1987), Azerbaijani footballer
- Arif Demirer (1909–1995), Turkish politician
- Arif Dirlik (1940–2017), Turkish historian
- Arif Doğan (1945–2014), Turkish Army officer
- Arif Doğru (born 1951), Turkish boxer
- Arif Durrani (born 1949), Pakistani businessman
- Arif Erdem (born 1972), Turkish footballer
- Arif Fadzilah (born 1996), Malaysian footballer
- Ariful Kabir Farhad (born 1980), Bangladeshi footballer
- Arif Gaziyev (1937–2021), Azerbaijani painter and sculptor
- Arif Mahmood Gill (born 1970), Pakistani politician
- Arif Guliyev (1950–2021), Azerbaijani actor
- Arif Gürdenlı (born 1966), Turkish sailor
- Arif Erkin Güzelbeyoğlu (1935–2025), Turkish actor and musician
- Arif Habib (born 1953), Pakistani businessman and philanthropist
- Arif Hajili (born 1962), Azerbaijani politician
- Ariful Haque (actor) (born 1931), Bangladeshi actor and writer
- Ariful Haque (cricketer) (born 1992), Bangladeshi cricketer
- Arif Hasan (born 1943), Pakistani architect, activist, social researcher, and writer
- Arif Hasan (journalist), Bangladeshi television executive and journalist
- Arif Al Haydar (born 1997), Saudi footballer
- Arif Heralić (1922–1971), Bosnian metal worker
- Arif Heydarov (1926–1978), Azerbaijani Army officer and politician
- Arif Hiqmeti (died 1916), Albanian rebel
- Arif Huseynov (born 1943), Azerbaijani painter
- Arif Hussain Hussaini (1946–1988), Pakistani Shiite Islamic scholar and politician
- Arif İsayev (born 1985), Azerbaijani footballer
- Arif Ismail (born 1986), Malaysian footballer
- Arif Mustafa Jatoi, Pakistani politician
- Ariful Islam Jony (born 1996), Bangladeshi cricketer
- Arif Khan Joy (born 1971), Bangladeshi politician and footballer
- Arif Md Yeasin Jwadder, Indian lawyer and activist
- Arif Karaoğlan (born 1986), Turkish-German footballer
- Arif Khan (cricketer) (born 2001), Afghan cricketer
- Arif Khan (former actor) (born 1968), Indian actor and Islamic missionary
- Arif Khan (skier) (born 1990), Indian alpine skier
- Arif Khan (warlord) (died 2000), Afghan warlord
- Arif Mohammad Khan (born 1951), Indian politician
- Arif Khattak (born 1961), Pakistani cricketer
- Arif Kocaman (born 2003), Turkish footballer
- Arif Hikmet Koyunoğlu (1888–1982), Turkish architect
- Arif Lohar (born 1966), Pakistani singer and actor
- Arif Magomedov (born 1992), Russian boxer
- Arif Maharramov (1948–2022), Azerbaijani film artist
- Arif Malikov (1933–2019), Azerbaijani composer
- Arif Mammadov (born 1960), Azerbaijani engineer, economist, and politician
- Arif Mammadov (ambassador) (born 1964), Azerbaijani activist and diplomat
- Arif Mardin (1932–2006), Turkish-American music producer
- Arif Masood (born 1972), Indian politician
- Arif Mehmood (born 1983), Pakistani footballer
- Arif Mirzayev (1944–2026), Azerbaijani composer, organist, and pianist
- Arif Mirzoýew (born 1980), Turkmen footballer
- Arif Moinuddin, Bangladeshi politician
- Arif Hossain Moon (born 1968), Bangladeshi footballer
- Arif Morkaya (born 1989), Turkish footballer
- Arif Jameel Mubarakpuri (born 1971), Indian Islamic scholar and writer
- Arif Nakai (1930–2000), Pakistani politician
- Arif Naqvi (born 1960), Pakistani businessman
- Arif Niftullayev, Azerbaijani wrestler
- Arif Nizami (1948–2021), Pakistani journalist and politician
- Arif Havas Oegroseno (born 1963), Indonesian diplomat
- Arif Örgüç (1876–1940), Turkish Army officer
- Arif Ozakca (born 1979), British artist
- Arif Özen (born 1998), Turkish wrestler
- Arif Dwi Pangestu (born 2004), Indonesian archer
- Arif Pašalić (1943–1998), Bosnian Army officer
- Arif Pasha (born 1959), Azerbaijani Army officer and politician
- Arif Pashayev (born 1934), Azerbaijani businessman
- Arif Peçenek (1959–2013), Turkish football player and manager
- Arifur Rahman (born 1984), Bangladeshi-Norwegian cartoonist, illustrator, and animator
- Arifur Rahman (footballer) (born 1999), Bangladeshi footballer
- Arif Yanggi Rahman (born 1994), Indonesian footballer
- Arif Rasidi (born 1980), French-Indonesian badminton player
- Arif Abd al-Raziq (1894–1944), Palestinian rebel
- Arif Abdul Razzaq (1921–2007), Iraqi Army officer and politician
- Arif Razzuq, Syrian physician, humanitarian, and politician
- Arif Riwgari (died 1219), Uzbek Sufi teacher
- Arif Sağ (born 1946), Turkish singer
- Arif Şahin (born 1985), Turkish footballer
- Arif Salimov (born 1956), Azerbaijani mathematician
- Arif Satria (born 1995), Indonesian footballer
- Arif Satria (academic) (born 1971), Indonesian economist
- Arif Şentürk (1941–2022), Turkish singer
- Arif Setiawan (born 1998), Indonesian footballer
- Arif Shah Omar Shah (born 1956), Malaysian politician
- Arif Shaikh (born 1993), Indian footballer
- Arif Shaqirin (born 2000), Malaysian footballer
- Arif Aziz Sheikh, Pakistani politician
- Arif Shirvani (1786–1866), Azerbaijani poet
- Arif Şirin (1949–2019), Turkish musician, poet, composer, and songwriter
- Arif Susam (born 1956), Turkish singer
- Arif Suyono (born 1984), Indonesian footballer
- Arif Tabrizi (died 1805), Iranian poet
- Arif Taşdelen (born 1974), Turkish-German politician
- Arif Valiyev (1943–2014), Azerbaijani politician
- Arif Virani (born 1971), Indian-Canadian lawyer and politician
- Arif Wazir (1982–2020), Pakistani politician
- Arif Wibowo (born 1968), Indonesian politician
- Arif Yaqoob (born 1994), Pakistani cricketer
- Arif Yousaf, Pakistani politician
- Arif Yunusov (born 1955), Azerbaijani author, historian, and activist
- Arif Zahir (born 1994), American actor, rapper, singer, songwriter, and voice impressionist
- Arif Zakaria (born 1966), Indian actor
- Arif Zaman, Pakistani mathematician and academic

=== Ariff ===
- Ariff Sabri Abdul Aziz (born 1956), Malaysian politician and blogger
- Ariff Farhan Isa (born 1996), Malaysian footballer
- Ariff Ar-Rasyid (born 1998), Malaysian footballer
- Ariff Suradi (1929–2014), Singaporean politician
