= 2016 in aviation =

This is a list of aviation-related events in 2016.

== Events ==
=== January ===
8 January

- West Air Sweden Flight 294, a Canadair Regional Jet CRJ-200PF on a domestic cargo flight in Norway from Oslo to Tromsø, suddenly descended after a brief Mayday and crashed near Akkajaure, Sweden, killing both crew.

9 January

- Tracey Curtis-Taylor completed a solo flight from England to Australia, in the Stearman open-cockpit biplane Spirit of Artemis. During the 100-day, 21,000 km (13,000 mi) flight, begun on 1 October 2015, she flew over 23 countries to recreate the first solo flight by Amy Johnson between the two countries by a woman in 1930.

14 January

- Air France retired the Boeing 747 with a send-off formation flight with the Patrouille de France aerobatic team, which departed Charles de Gaulle Airport in Paris and made a clockwise circuit around France before returning. Air France has operated 68 747s since 1974 which carried 250 million passengers, and will be replaced by Airbus A380s and Boeing 777s on long-haul flights.

28 January

- Iran agreed to buy 12 A380, 16 A350-1000, 45 A330, and 45 A320-family aircraft from Airbus in a $27 billion deal but requires United States export licenses, where some Airbus parts are manufactured. Iran does not plan on delivery of them until ca. 2020 as airport expansions and more urgent civil aviation needs come first.

=== February ===
2 February

- Daallo Airlines Flight 159, an Airbus A321-100 flying from Mogadishu to Djibouti City had an explosion which blew a hole in the fuselage and ignited a passenger who was sucked out at altitude. The airliner returned to Mogadishu and the burned body was found near Balad, Somalia. Two others on board had minor injuries.

18 February

- The US government allowed Boeing to enter into talks with airlines in Iran. Replacing Iran's aging fleet would be a significant sale for Boeing, although the company requires additional United States government approvals before selling aircraft.
- Sir Richard Branson unveils Virgin Galactic's new VSS Unity, a SpaceShipTwo-class rocket-powered suborbital spaceplane in Mojave, California.

22 February

- British Royal Navy test pilot Eric "Winkle" Brown died at the age of 97. He survived 11 aircraft crashes and the sinking of an escort carrier, flew a record 487 different types of aircraft, and made 2,407 carrier landings, also a world record, and he made the first jet carrier landing, with a de Havilland Sea Vampire in 1945. Although retired in 1970, he continued flying until 1994.

24 February

- Tara Air Flight 193, a de Havilland Canada DHC-6 Twin Otter on a domestic flight in Nepal from Pokhara Airport to Jomsom Airport, crashes and burns near Dana shortly after takeoff, killing all 23 passengers.

26 February

- An Air Kasthamandap PAC 750XL crashes at Chilkhaya, Nepal, killing both crew and injuring all nine passengers.
- Solar Impulse 2 made its first 90-minute test flight over the Pacific after repairs following being grounded in Kalaeloa, Hawaii, on 3 July 2015 when the first manned solar-powered aircraft circumnavigation attempt stopped with damaged batteries. They plan to resume in late April 2016, continuing on to Phoenix, Arizona.

29 February

- Part of what appears to be skin from a Boeing 777 horizontal stabilizer is found on a sandbar on the Mozambique coast by a tourist, raising hopes that it is debris from Malaysian Airlines Flight 370, a Boeing 777 missing since 8 March 2014.
- The National Aeronautics and Space Administration (NASA) announced a $20 million contract to Lockheed Martin for a Quiet Supersonic Technology demonstrator to reduce sonic boom noise and damage, to allow "low-boom" supersonic transports to be supersonic over populated areas.

=== March ===
3 March

- A man finds a piece of debris with a blue border on Réunion on the Indian Ocean near where he found a flaperon from Malaysian Airlines Flight 370 in July 2015 raising hopes that it is from the same aircraft.

9 March

- True Aviation Flight 21, an Antonov An-26, suffered an engine failure shortly after takeoff from Cox's Bazar Airport in Bangladesh, and crashed into the Bay of Bengal while attempting to return, killing three of the four on board and critically injuring the fourth.

12 March

- A South African family contacted authorities in South Africa the previous week to report debris their son found on a Mozambique beach on 30 December 2015 which they took to South Africa. Aviation officials will examine it to see if it is from Malaysian Airlines Flight 370.

13 March

- The accident investigation into the 25 March 2015 crash of Germanwings Flight 9525 leads French authorities to call for stricter international monitoring of pilot mental health and guidelines under which doctors would report pilots whose psychological condition might put flight safety at risk. The French also urge German authorities to limit legal penalties on doctors breaching patient confidentiality in good faith to report psychological problems with pilots and to define "imminent danger" to flight safety.

15 March

- An Ecuadorian Air Force IAI Arava carrying 22 Ecuadorian Army troops for parachute training and an air force crew of three crashes in Hacienda la Palmira near Shell Mera, Ecuador, killing all on board.

19 March

- Flydubai Flight 981, a Boeing 737-8KN aborts two landings in poor visibility at Rostov-on-Don Airport. During the second go-around, it crashes after an abrupt and rapid descent from an altitude of 4,050 ft (1,230 m), killing all 62 occupants. It is Flydubai's first fatal accident in seven years of operation.

21 March

- A South African archaeologist finds debris on a beach in South Africa. The next day, a Malaysia official announced that the debris bears an aircraft engine company logo and will be examined for any connection to Malaysian Airlines Flight 370.

22 March

- Two bombs detonated at Brussels Airport in Belgium, killing at least 11 people and injuring around 100. The airport was closed until 3 April, with all flights re-routed. A third bomb later exploded at Maelbeek (or Maalbeek) metro station in the City of Brussels, killing 20 and injuring 130. The Islamic State claimed responsibility.

27 March

- The Portuguese regional airline Portugália is rebranded as Tap Express.

29 March

- A man said to be wearing an explosive belt hijacks EgyptAir Flight 181 Airbus A320-200 during a domestic flight from Alexandria, Egypt to Cairo and forces it to fly to Larnaca International Airport in Larnaca, Cyprus. He is arrested and no one is harmed.
- A chartered Aero Teknic Mitsubishi MU-2 flying in bad weather crashed into the Gulf of St. Lawrence on approach to Îles-de-la-Madeleine Airport in the Magdalen Islands in Quebec, Canada, killing all seven on board. Canadian television commentator and former Minister of Transport Jean Lapierre, his wife, two brothers and a sister had been en route to Lapierre's father's funeral and are among the dead.

=== April ===
3 April

- The Australian government stated that hotel guests on Mauritius found the first debris possibly from the interior of missing Malaysian Airlines Flight 370 Boeing 777 the previous week which will be examined to determine if it is from the missing airliner.
- Limited flight operations resume at Brussels Airport in Zaventem, Belgium, by Brussels Airlines who make three departures, following the 22 March terrorist bombings there.

4 April

- Batik Air Flight 7703 Boeing 737-8GP(WL) with 56 people collides during takeoff from Halim Perdanakusuma Airport, Jakarta, Indonesia, with a TransNusa ATR 42-600 as it is being towed with four on board. The 737's left wing catches fire as it severs the ATR 42's vertical stabilizer and outer left wing. Everyone is evacuated safely.
- Alaska Airlines agrees to buy Virgin America for $2.6 billion including debt and leases in a deal worth about $4 billion. The combined airline has 1,200 daily departures and hubs in Anchorage, Alaska, Seattle, Washington, Portland, Oregon, San Francisco, California and Los Angeles, California. Virgin America began operations in 2007.

13 April

- A Sunbird Aviation Britten-Norman BN-2T Turbine Islander crashes just short of the runway at Kiunga, Papua New Guinea, killing all 12 occupants.

17 April

- Air France resumes flights to Iran after an eight-year hiatus with a flight from Paris to Imam Khomeini International Airport in Tehran, beginning a three-times-per-week service. Air France joins Lufthansa and Austrian Airlines in providing air passenger service between Europe and Iran.

29 April

- A Eurocopter EC225 Super Puma helicopter operated by CHC Helikopter Service loses its main rotor in flight while carrying oil workers from the Gullfaks B oil field in the North Sea to Bergen Airport, Flesland, in Norway, and crashes on Norway's Skitholmen islet between the islands of Turøy and Toftøy, killing all 13 occupants.

=== May ===
12 May

- Malaysia announced that debris from an engine cowling with a partial Rolls-Royce logo found in March on the coast of South Africa and an interior panel from an aircraft cabin found on Rodrigues were "almost certainly" from Malaysian Airlines Flight 370.

18 May

- A Silk Way Airlines Antonov An-12 cargo airplane had an engine failure taking off from Dwyer Airport in Afghanistan and crashed, killing seven of the nine crew.
- Saab debuts its new JAS 39 Gripen E fighter in a rollout at Linköping, Sweden.

19 May

- EgyptAir Flight 804 Airbus A320-232 crashed into the Mediterranean south of Karpathos due to a cockpit fire, killing all 66 occupants on a flight from Paris to Cairo.

27 May

- Korean Air Flight 2708 Boeing 777-300 aborted its takeoff due to an engine failure and fire at Haneda Airport in Tokyo, Japan and during the evacuation twelve of the 319 people were injured.

28 May

- A World War II-era P-47 Thunderbolt crashes into the Hudson River off Edgewater, New Jersey, killing its pilot.

=== June ===
10 June

- The F-35 Lightning II makes its international airshow debut when two Royal Netherlands Air Force F-35A aircraft perform at the Luchtmachtdagen 2016 airshow at Leeuwarden Air Base in the Netherlands.

15 June

- The Government of Egypt announces the discovery and imaging of the wreckage of EgyptAir Flight 804 Airbus A320-232 in the Mediterranean which crashed on 19 May 2016, killing all 66 on board.

16 June

- The cockpit voice recorder from EgyptAir Flight 804 is recovered from a depth of about 3,000 m (9,800 ft) in the Mediterranean.

17 June

- EgyptAir Flight 804's second flight data recorder is recovered from a depth of about 3,000 m (9,800 ft) in the Mediterranean. They were badly damaged prior to recovery and required repairs before data could be processed.
- National Aeronautics and Space Administration Administrator Charles Bolden announces plans for the X-57 Maxwell, a 14-motor, all-electric airplane at an American Institute of Aeronautics and Astronautics conference in Washington, D.C., to spur the development of more energy-efficient and cleaner general aviation aircraft.

21 June

- Boeing announced a tentative agreement for Iran Air to buy Boeing 737s and Boeing 777s airliners to replace its pre-1979 Boeings in the first major U.S. trade deal in Iran following the 2015 Iran-United States nuclear accord. It still faces political and regulatory hurdles, but the first new airliners could be in Iran in October 2016. The deal could be worth $25 billion, depending on how many are new or leased.

29 June

- After a nonstop transatlantic flight from Marine Corps Air Station Beaufort, South Carolina, a Royal Air Force Lockheed Martin F-35B Lightning II aircraft arrived at RAF Fairford in the United Kingdom, making the first F-35 in the United Kingdom.

=== July ===
- Tunisair inaugurates its first transatlantic service, operating between Tunis and Montreal.

1 July

- A Russian Ministry of Emergency Situations Ilyushin Il-76 aerial firefighting airplane crashed near Lake Baikal while fighting a forest fire, killing all 10 on board. The wreck was found on 3 July.

10 July

- At the Farnborough International Airshow Boeing said they saw strong interest in a new mid-range airliner seating between 200 and 270, creating a new, larger market beyond that of the Boeing 757 and Airbus A321neo. It would cost $10 to $15 billion to develop and be the company's biggest potential product development over the next decade.

14 July

- Airbus and Boeing have their lowest airliner sales at the Farnborough Air Show in six years, with deals for about 400 aircraft worth about $50 billion, half of the previous year's sales. American, European, and Persian Gulf carriers made almost no deals, and only Asian carriers made large orders. No orders are made for the Boeing 777, Airbus A330neo, or Bombardier C-Series, and Airbus A380 production was greatly reduced. Industry analysts blame reduced sales on uncertainty over the global economy and on the United Kingdom's 23 June 2016 vote to leave the European Union.

20 July

- A network router fails in Southwest Airlines' computer system and back-up systems fail to activate, causing a 12-hour outage that cripples the airline's flight operations throughout the United States. Normal operations do not resume fully until 24 July, during which time Southwest cancelled about 2,300 of approximately 19,500 scheduled flights.

22 July

- An Indian Air Force Antonov An-32 with 29 people on board crashes in the Bay of Bengal during a flight from Tambaram, India, to Port Blair in the Andaman Islands. In January 2024, the wreckage of the aircraft was found.

30 July

- A hot-air balloon operated by Heart of Texas Hot Air Balloon Rides caught fire and crashed in a field in Maxwell, Texas, killing all 16 people on board in the deadliest ballooning accident in U.S. history and second-deadliest in world history, exceeded only by a Luxor crash in Egypt in February 2013 that killed 19.

=== August ===
5 August

- An ASL Airlines Hungary Flight 7332 Boeing 737-476SF cargo aircraft slid off a runway at Il Caravaggio International Airport in Italy while landing in bad weather conditions. It crashed through a perimeter fence onto a highway, narrowly avoiding oncoming cars but destroying several in an adjacent parking lot. Neither crew members are injured. The airport closed for three hours, and flights diverted to Milan, Italy.

8 August

- Delta's computer problems forced it to canceled 2,300 flights over three days, delaying tens of thousands of passengers and cost Delta $100 million in revenue.

16 August

- Air Djibouti relaunches flight operations, using a Boeing 737-400. It is the first time the airline has flown since 2002.

17 August

- The Hybrid Air Vehicles 92 m (302 ft) Airlander 10 hybrid airship made its first flight, of 30 minutes, at Cardington Airfield in England.

27 August

- While Southwest Airlines Flight 3472, a Boeing 737-700 was flying to Orlando, Florida from New Orleans, Louisiana the left nacelle exploded at altitude, damaging the fuselage and causing the cabin to lose air pressure. No-one is injured and an emergency landing was made at Pensacola, Florida.

30 August

- Joe Sutter, the chief engineer leading the 2,700 engineers who designed the Boeing 747 in the 1960s, died at the age of 95.

=== September ===
16 September

- The United States Air Force announced the grounding of 13 of its own F-35A Lightning IIs and two belonging to the Royal Norwegian Air Force due to fuel tank insulation problems which also affect 42 undelivered F-35As.
- Bulgaria's national airline Bulgaria Air announced that it will make commercial flights to the United States for the first time since the 1990s, beginning in March 2017.

19 September

- United States Secretary of the Air Force Deborah Lee James announced that a new bomber, the B-21 Raider is under development by Northrop Grumman for the U.S. Air Force's Long-Range Strike Bomber program. The B-21 is expected be operational in the mid-2020s.

20 September

- Bulgaria Air confirms the lease of 14 new Boeing 737 aircraft to replace the Airbus A320s it operates in a deal valued at more than $8 billion.

28 September

- A team from the Netherlands investigating the July 2014 Malaysian Airlines Flight 17 crash in Ukraine announced that the airliner was shot down by a surface-to-air missile fired by a Buk missile system smuggled from Russia into a pro-Russian separatist area of eastern Ukraine a few hours before it fired on the airliner, and was returned to Russia the next day. They identified over 100 people involved in the operation and are investigating who ordered that it be fired. The team's findings matched those of American investigators, while the Russians dismissed some of the evidence. They said that its investigation was biased while Russian separatists in Ukraine said they have no access to surface-to-air missiles and said the airliner's destruction was caused by the Ukrainian armed forces.

=== October ===
21 October

- Skol Airlines Flight 9375, a Mil Mi-8 helicopter with at least 22 occupants, crashed in Russia's Yamalo-Nenets Autonomous Okrug, killing at least 19.

24 October

- A Luxembourg-registered CAE Aviation Fairchild SA227-AT Merlin IVC on a surveillance mission for the French Directorate-General of Customs and Indirect Taxes crashed just after takeoff from Malta International Airport, killing its crew of five.

25 October

- World War II, air show, and test pilot Bob Hoover dies at the age of 94.

28 October

- The right engine of American Airlines Flight 383 Boeing 767-300ER suffers an uncontained failure during the airliner's takeoff roll at O'Hare International Airport in Chicago, Illinois, with pieces of the engine hitting a nearby building, but no one on the ground is injured. The General Electric CF6 engine then catches fire. The crew aborts the takeoff and brings the plane to a stop before the end of the runway and all 170 people and a dog evacuate, with 20 having minor injuries.
- FedEx Express Flight 910, a McDonnell Douglas MD-10-10F cargo aircraft has its landing gear collapse as it lands at Fort Lauderdale–Hollywood International Airport in Florida. The plane skids to a halt and a fire breaks out that destroys the left engine and wing. The crew of three escaped.

31 October

- Alfa Indonesia PEN Turbo DHC-4T Turbo Caribou crashed during a domestic flight from Timika to Ilaga, Indonesia, into the side of Ilaga Pass in Papua, at an altitude of 3,900 m (12,800 ft), killing all four on board. Its wreckage was found the next day.

=== November ===
15 November

- Boom Technology unveiled its XB-1 Baby Boom supersonic technology demonstrator, a scaled-down version of a 45-passenger supersonic airliner it hopes to fly in 2018, and have in service by 2023.

22 November

- Approximately 250 ABX Air cargo aircraft pilots go on strike, as the airline is violated their contract by assigning too many flights. ABX Air said this is illegal. The strike impacts deliveries for ABX Air's two biggest customers, Amazon and DHL Express, as the 2016 Christmas shopping season begins.

28 November

- The first scheduled commercial airline flight between the United States and Havana, Cuba since the early 1960s takes place as an American Airlines jet arrived at Havana's Jose Marti International Airport. JetBlue initiated their Havana service later in the day.
- LaMia Flight 2933, a Avro RJ85 crashed in Colombia after its crew declared electrical and fuel emergencies, killing 71 of the 77 people on board, including 19 members of the Associação Chapecoense de Futebol team, and leaving all six survivors injured. Survivors included three team members, while a fourth died in hospital.

29 November

=== December ===
7 December

- After an engine failure, Pakistan International Airlines Flight 661 ATR 42-500 crashed near Havelian, Pakistan, killing all 47 on board, including Pakistani actor, singer-songwriter, and televangelist Junaid Jamshed.

12 December

- In the wake of the 7 December crash of Flight 661, Pakistan International Airlines grounds five ATR 42 and ATR 72 airliners in its fleet after the Pakistan Civil Aviation Authority tested all of them.

18 December

- Flying in poor weather, an Indonesian Air Force C-130H Hercules with 12 t (12,000 kg; 26,000 lb) of food and cement crashed on Mount Lisuwa while on approach to Wamena Airport in Indonesia, killing all 13 on board.

23 December

- Two supporters of the late Libyan leader Muammar Gaddafi hijacked Afriqiyah Airways Flight 209, an Airbus A320 during a flight in Libya from Sebha to Tripoli, stated they had a hand grenade and forcing the pilots to fly to Malta where they demanded political asylum and surrendered. No one was injured.
- Vesna Vulović, the sole survivor of the 26 January 1972 JAT Flight 367 crash, died at age 66. After the airliner broke up at altitude over Czechoslovakia, she set a record for surviving the longest fall without a parachute, which still stood when she died.

25 December

- A Russian military Tupolev Tu-154 transport crashes into the Black Sea after departing Sochi International Airport in Russia, killing all 92 on board, including 64 members of the Alexandrov Ensemble "Red Army Choir", Russian humanitarian Elizaveta Glinka, known as "Doctor Liza", who was accompanying medicine for a hospital in Syria, and 9 journalists.

31 December

- Philippine Airlines announced they will join the Oneworld airline alliance. It is the second southeast Asia airline to join, following Malaysia Airlines.

== First flights ==
=== January ===
- 29 January –Boeing 737 MAX 8

=== February ===
- 6 February – Enstrom TH180
- 9 February – Airbus A321neo

=== March ===
- 2 March – AgustaWestland AW109 Trekker

=== April ===
- 4 April – Skyleader UL-39 Albi
- 22 April – Mitsubishi X-2 Shinshin
- 28 April – Kamov Ka-62

=== May ===
- 17 May – Diamond Dart 450
- 23 May – Embraer E190-E2
- 31 May – HAL HTT-40

=== July ===
- 21 July – Tecnam P2012 Traveller

=== August ===
- 17 August – Hybrid Air Vehicles Airlander 10

=== October ===
- 26 October – Beriev A-100

=== November ===
- 4 November – Bombardier Global 7000
- 21 November – Stratos 714
- 24 November – Airbus A350-1000

=== December ===
- 17 December – Gulfstream G600
- 20 December
  - Avicopter AC352
  - Boeing BTX-1

== Entered service ==
- 25 January – Airbus A320neo with Lufthansa
- 28 June – Comac ARJ21-700 with Chengdu Airlines
- 15 July – Bombardier CS100 with Swiss Global Air Lines
- 2 August – Lockheed Martin F-35A Lightning II with the United States Air Force
- 14 December – Bombardier CS300 with airBaltic

== Retirements ==
14 January

- The Boeing 747 from Air France.

7 October

- The last Tupolev Tu-154M airliner is retired by Belavia.

23 November

- The Airbus A340 from Iberia.

== Deadliest crash ==
The deadliest crash of this year was a government official flight, namely the 2016 Russian Defence Ministry Tupolev Tu-154 crash, which crashed into the Black Sea near Sochi, Russia on 25 December killing all 92 people on board. The deadliest civil aviation crash of the year was LaMia Flight 2933, an Avro RJ85 which crashed in Colombia on 28 November, killing 71 of the 77 people on board.
