= 2016 Silk Way Airlines Antonov An-12 crash =

2016 aviation accident in Afghanistan

Coordinates: 31°05′31″N 064°04′01″E

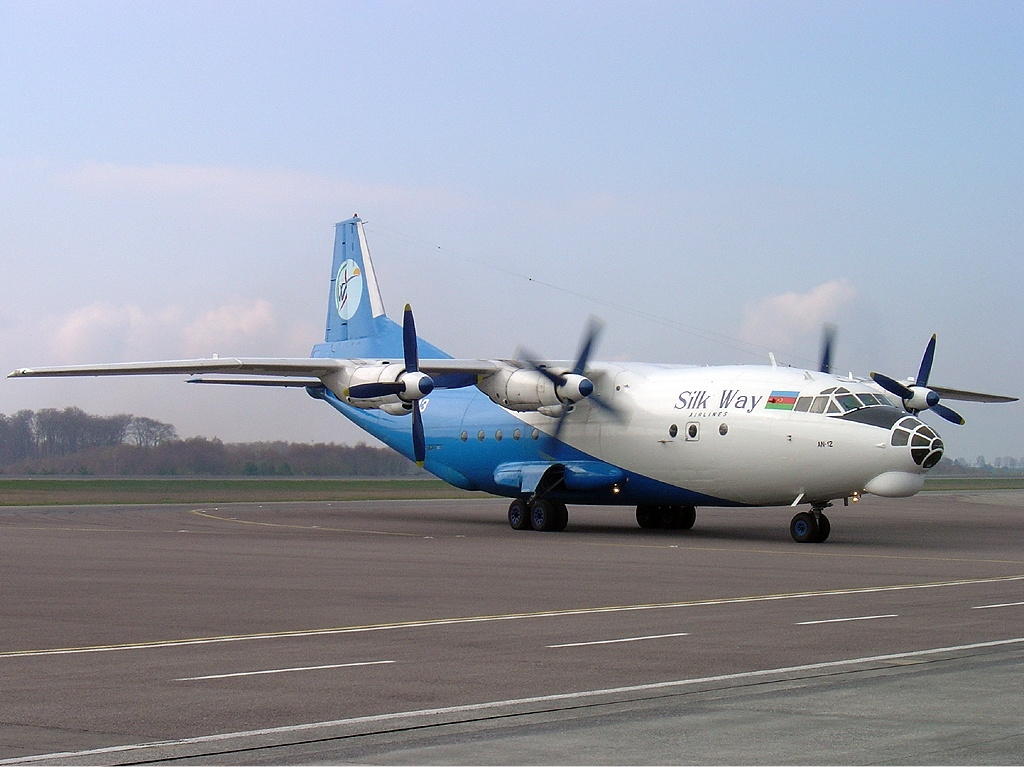
- An Antonov An-12 of Silk Way Airlines similar to the aircraft involved

Accident
- Date: 18 May 2016
- Summary: Runway overrun due to engine failure and pilot error
- Site: Dwyer Airport, Lashkargah, Afghanistan

Aircraft
- Aircraft type: Antonov An-12
- Operator: Silk Way Airlines
- IATA flight No.: ZP 4K-AZ25
- ICAO flight No.: AZQ 4K-AZ25
- Call sign: SILK LINE 4K-AZ25
- Registration: 4K-AZ25
- Flight origin: Dwyer Airport, Afghanistan
- Destination: Mary International Airport, Turkmenistan
- Occupants: 9
- Passengers: 0
- Crew: 9
- Fatalities: 7
- Injuries: 2
- Survivors: 2

On 18 May 2016, a Silk Way Airlines Antonov An-12 cargo plane crashed after an engine failure during the take off run at Dwyer Airport in southern Afghanistan, en route to Mary International Airport in Turkmenistan. Seven of the nine crew members on board were killed in the crash, which was the second crash for Silk Way in Afghanistan after a 2011 Il-76 crash. The two survivors were Ukrainian nationals, who worked as technicians and were not in the flights cockpit; they were taken to hospital and treated for their injuries.

Arif Mammadov, head of Azerbaijan's State Civil Aviation Administration, said that the aircraft crashed after hitting an obstruction.

Azerbaijan's Accident Investigation Commission dispatched a team to Camp Dwyer to investigate the crash.

== Aircraft and crew ==
The aircraft involved in the crash, registered as 4K-AZ25, was an Antonov An-12 cargo aircraft, powered by four Ivchenko AI-20M-6 turboprop engines. At the time of the incident, the aircraft was 53 years old as it was constructed in 1963 and delivered on 19 July of the same year to Soviet Air Force and after multiple leases finally in September 2015 became the property of Silk Way Airlines.

The aircraft was expected to be permanently retired from operational service and presumably scrapped in October 2016, 5 months later.

The crew consisted of an Uzbekistan national, 3 Ukrainians and 5 Azeris. The captain was the 66-year-old Uzbekistan national Rashid Shaydanov with 22,628 flight hours total, 3,953 flight hours on An-12 aircraft, with his first officer being 35-year-old Altay Abdullayev, with 4,625 flight hours total, 836 flight hours on An-12 aircraft, and along with them were Flight Navigator Nazim Asadullayev and Radio Operator Firdovsi Shaverdiyev.

== Investigation ==
On 8 June 2016 the Interstate Aviation Committee (MAK) announced, that Afghanistan have delegated the accident investigation to the MAK, the MAK is now leading the investigation into the accident, Azerbaijan's Accident Investigation Commissions as well as specialists from Ukrainian aircraft manufacturer are participating in this investigation. On 16 November 2016 Russia's MAK released their preliminary report reporting that First Officer Abdullayev was pilot flying, and Captain Shaydanov was pilot monitoring. While taxiing out for departure the flight engineer reported the #3 engine (inboard right hand) was showing a measured gas temperature (MGT, the gas temperature inside the turbine) of above 600 and even 700 degrees, the captain requested to be more attentive. The flaps were set to 15 degrees, CG as well as gross weight was within limits. While reading the takeoff checklist the propellers were locked, #1 and #4 propellers moved into their locked position, the #2 propeller reached the position about 17 seconds after the others, there was no evidence the #3 propeller ever locked. ATC reported the winds from 280 degrees at 14 knots gusting 26 knots and cleared the flight for takeoff.

The final report was released by the Russian Interstate Aviation Committee in October 2022, stated that the probable cause was the crew decision to conduct the takeoff with engine #3 inoperative, the propeller of which was not feathered. In course of the takeoff run, engine #3 was kept in the Ground Idle mode, therefore the propeller was producing a negative thrust which was increasing as the speed was increasing, preventing the aircraft from reaching the liftoff speed. During the takeoff run, the crew took no measures to abort the takeoff, and this resulted in the aircraft runway overrun at a speed of 220 km/h (140 mph), as well as in the aircraft destruction in the post-crash fire and in the deaths of people.

As stated above, the crew made a decision to conduct a takeoff with inoperative engine #3. Most probably, this decision had been made considering that at the Dwyer AD there were no conditions necessary for the engine overhaul or change. During the takeoff run no crew reports related to the abnormal engine #3 operation were recorded. Thus, the aircraft takeoff run was conducted with the unfeathered propeller of the inoperative engine #3 which caused a significant negative thrust development and inhibited the speed increase. This conclusion is also proved by the mathematical model made by Antonov State Company. According to Antonov State Company conclusion, the model results that more accurately meet the recorded aircraft trajectory parameters are the results of the scenario when there is no autofeathering of the engine #3 propeller as an answer to the reverse thrust alert. The engine #3 propeller turns into windmilling (i.e. it continues to spin because air flows over the blades, even though the engine is off) with the negative thrust development which increases as the speed increases. The situation was caused by not setting the engine #3 throttle control lever to 40±2 degrees temperature mode. Moreover, according to Antonov State Company conclusion, it should be assumed that the propeller of engine #3 (inoperative engine) was not latched to the flight stop.

During the takeoff run, the unfeathered propeller created the maximum negative thrust which made the takeoff impossible. The available data do not provide the opportunity to precisely determine the reason why during the takeoff run, the crew did not increase the engine #3 rpm up to the values more than the ground idle. The most probable reason may be the increase of the turbine outlet temperature of engine #3 above the maximum allowable taxiing limit. Probably, the crew was afraid that the increase of the inoperative engine rpm may cause the recurrent increase of the turbine outlet temperature above the allowable limit.

The recorded information and the CCTV data of Dwyer AD evidence that with the elevator nose-up deflection to -14°, the aircraft did not lift off. On running along all the runway length (2,439 m; 8,002 ft), and the concrete area of 90 m (300 ft) at a speed of 220 kilometres per hour (140 mph), at 10:00:57, the aircraft ran over the runway and reached the ground. The total run before the aircraft overran the runway concrete surface lasted 70 s. During the takeoff run the crew took no measures to abort the takeoff.
