= United International Supplies =

Wholesale industrial machinery and equipment company based in Virginia, United States

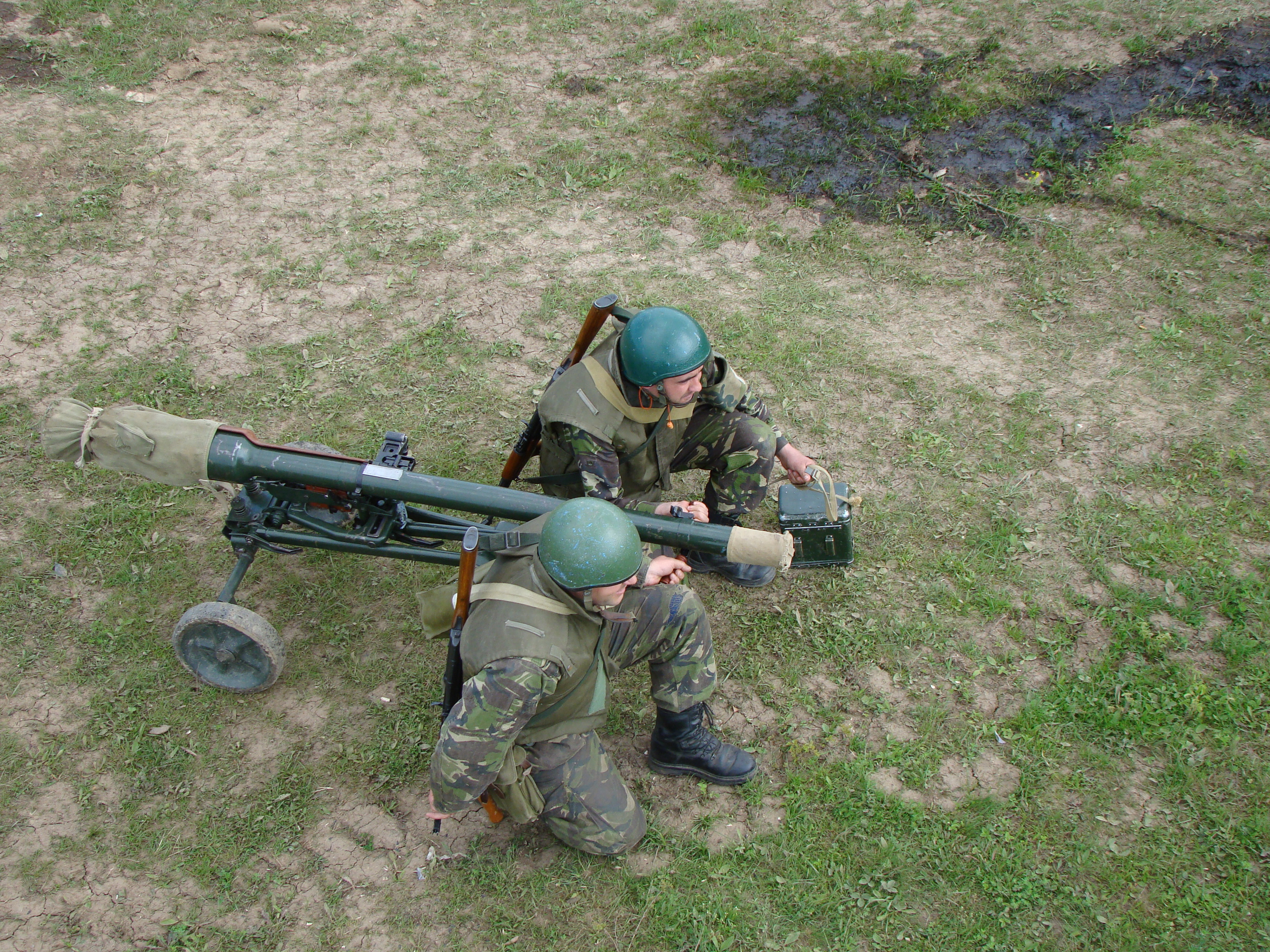
- Romanian PG-9 rockets of the type purchased by United International Supplies and used by ISIS fighters in Iraq and Syria.
- Founded: 1987; 38 years ago
- Founders: Helmut Mertins
- Headquarters: Arlington, Virginia, U.S.
- Area served: Worldwide
- Products: Arms industry

United International Supplies is a United States company based in Alexandria, Virginia that was founded by Helmut Mertins. The company was created in 1987 and according to Bloomberg L.P. its "business includes the wholesale distribution of industrial machinery and equipment."

United International Supplies has also sold police and military equipment. Its founder, Mertins, was the son of arms trafficker Gerhard Mertins. According to Conflict Arms Research the company played a role in the Iran-Contra affair.

In 2002–2003, United International Supplies purchased Romanian PG-9 73 mm rockets, a number of other rocket types, and small arms that were found in the possession of IS fighters in Fallujah, Mosul, Keramlais, Bartella, Tal Afar, and Baghdad in 2017. Shipments of 7.62×39mm ammunition that the company had received were also found in the Puntland of Somalia in 2017.

== See also ==
- Arif Durrani
- Gehlen Organization
- Merex Corporation
- Silk Way Airlines
