= Maariv (disambiguation) =

Maariv is a Jewish prayer service held in the evening or night. Maariv may also refer to:

- Maariv (newspaper), an Israeli newspaper
- Maariv Aravim, the first blessing before the Shema prayer and generally the opening prayer during Maariv

== See also ==
- Maarif (disambiguation)
- Ma'rib, a city in Yemen
