= AZQ =

AZQ may refer to:

- Diaziquone (AZQ), a chemotherapy drug
- IATA code of Silk Way Airlines
