= Seyidov =

Seyidov is a surname. Notable people with the surname include:

- Anwar Seyidov (1949–2025), Azerbaijani lawyer
- Aziz Seyidov (born 1956), Justice of the Supreme Court of Azerbaijan
- Hasan Seyidov (1932–2004), Azerbaijani politician
- Hasan Seyidov (scientist) (1908–1999), Azerbaijani politician
- Kanan Seyidov, Azerbaijani military officer
- Maharram Seyidov (1952–1990), National Hero of Azerbaijan
- Mirali Seyidov (1918–1992), Azerbaijani mifologist
- Mirasgar Seyidov (1970–1992), National Hero of Azerbaijan
- Mir Hidayat bey Seyidov (1887–1919), Azerbaijani politician
- Mirhuseyn Seyidov (born 1992), Azerbaijani footballer
- Samad Seyidov (born 1964), Azerbaijani politician
- Shakir Seyidov (born 2000), Azerbaijani footballer
