= Hazara cricket team =

Cricket team

Hazara was a first-class cricket team in Pakistan from the region of Hazara in the east of Khyber Pakhtunkhwa province. They played nine first-class matches between October 1983 and November 1985.

For the 1983–84 season the Pakistan Cricket Board accorded the BCCP Patron's Trophy status for the first time in several seasons, and Hazara was one of several new teams to play at first-class level. Over the next three seasons the team played nine matches in the competition, winning two, losing six and drawing one, with one other scheduled match not taking place.

Hazara began with a victory over another newly promoted team, Dera Ismail Khan, by an innings and 78 runs. It was the first-class debut match for every player on both sides. The Hazara captain, Rafat Nawaz, took 3 wickets for 13 runs in the first innings and 6 for 32 in the second, in his only first-class match.

Over the three seasons, Hazara lost their three matches against Rawalpindi and their three against Peshawar by large margins (five times by an innings, and once by 10 wickets). They won their 1984–85 match against Dera Ismail Khan by 17 runs, and rain ensured a draw between the same two teams in 1985–86, which was the last first-class match for both of them.

In 1986 the authorities again rearranged the structure of first-class cricket in Pakistan and Hazara (along with Dera Ismail Khan) dropped out. They continue to play at sub-first-class levels.

Hazara did not play any home games.

== Leading players ==
The highest score for Hazara was 97 not out by Nasim Fazal out of a team total of 217 against Peshawar in 1983–84. The best innings bowling figures were 6 for 28 by Imran Khaliq against Dera Ismail Khan in 1984–85. The best match bowling figures were 9 for 45 by Rafat Nawaz (as above). Overall Arshad Khattak scored most runs, 195 at an average of 15.00, and played most matches, seven. He also kept wicket in four matches. Four captains led the Hazara team between October 1983 and November 1985.
