= Arif Mammadov =

Azerbaijani engineer-economist

Arif Mammadov Arif Məmmədov
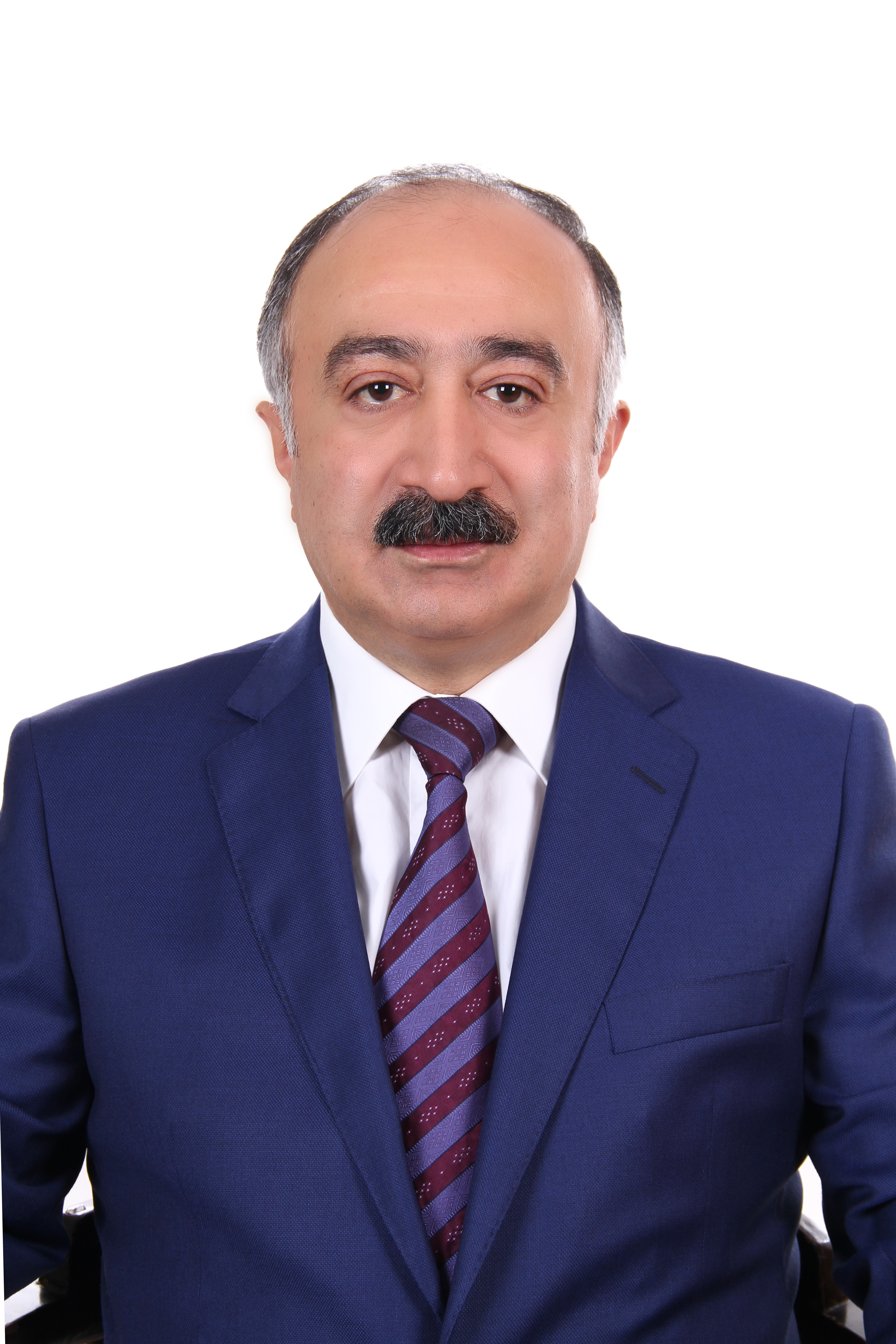

Director of State Civil Aviation Agency under the Ministry of Digital Development and Transport of Azerbaijan.
- Incumbent
- Assumed office 7 February 2008
- President: Ilham Aliyev

Personal details
- Born: 18 April 1960 (age 66) Baku, Azerbaijani SSR, Soviet Union

Arif Ahmad oglu Mammadov (Azerbaijani: Arif Əhməd oğlu Məmmədov) is an Azerbaijani engineer-economist, who serves as the Director of the State Civil Aviation Agency under the Ministry of Digital Development and Transport of Azerbaijan. Throughout his extensive career, Arif Mammadov was awarded the Taraggi Medal and the Shohrat Order for his contribution to the development of civil aviation of the Republic of Azerbaijan.

== Education ==
In 1979, Arif Mammadov graduated from the Leningrad Civil Aviation College with honours. Further straightening his education, Arif Mammadov graduated from the Kyiv Institute of Civil Aviation Engineers in 1988.

== Career ==
From 1979 to 1996, Arif Mammadov held various positions within Civil Aviation Authority of the Republic of Azerbaijan. He was the General representative of the State Concern Azerbaijan Airlines in Turkey from 1996 until 2000.

In the period of 2000–2008, he worked as the Head of the Coordination and Foreign Relations Department and as the Deputy Director General of the State Concern of the Azerbaijan Airlines.

Arif Mammadov was appointed as the Director of State Civil Aviation Administration of the Republic of Azerbaijan on 7 February 2008. On 16 July 2008 he was also appointed the Chairman of State Civil Aviation Collegium.

In the period of 2013–2016, he worked as the vice-president of the Azerbaijan Airlines Closed Joint Stock Company.

In 2016, he was appointed as the Director of the State Civil Aviation Administration of the Republic of Azerbaijan. From 2018 Arif Mammadov was appointed as the Director of the State Civil Aviation Agency under the Ministry of Transport, Communications and High Technologies of the Republic of Azerbaijan.

== Personal life ==
Arif Mammadov was born on 18 April 1960 in Baku, Azerbaijani SSR, then part of the Soviet Union. He is married and has two children.

== Awards ==
- Azerbaijan - 29.05.2013 - Taraggi Medal
- Azerbaijan - 17.04.2020 - Shohrat Order

== See also ==
- Cabinet of Azerbaijan
- Azerbaijan Airlines
