= Dera Ismail Khan cricket team =

Cricket team

Dera Ismail Khan was a first-class cricket team in Pakistan from the town of Dera Ismail Khan in the south of Khyber Pakhtunkhwa province. In 1964–65, in its first first-class match, it suffered the biggest defeat in the history of first-class cricket.

== 1964–65 season ==
Dera Ismail Khan had been scheduled to play in the Quaid-i-Azam Trophy in 1963–64, but withdrew shortly before the competition began.

Having previously played in the non-first-class preliminary rounds of the Ayub Trophy, Dera Ismail Khan was among the teams that made their first-class debuts when in 1964-65 all matches in the Ayub Trophy were classified as first-class.

In Dera Ismail Khan's first match, a three-day game against Railways at the Railways Moghalpura Institute Ground in Lahore, Railways won the toss and batted. They declared early on the third day at 910 for 6. They then dismissed Dera Ismail Khan for 32 and 27, in a total of 28 overs, thus winning by an innings and 851 runs. For all eleven Dera Ismail Khan players it was their only first-class match.

Dera Ismail Khan were scheduled to play a match in the Quaid-i-Azam Trophy later that season, and another in the Ayub Trophy in 1965–66, but they conceded both matches to their opponents without playing.

== 1980s ==
For the 1983–84 season the BCCP Patron's Trophy (the successor to the Ayub Trophy) was expanded, and Dera Ismail Khan returned to first-class cricket. Over the next three seasons the team played 10 matches, losing nine (eight of them by an innings) and drawing one.

In 10 of their 19 innings they failed to reach 100. Their only total over 150 came in their last game, when they made 214 against Hazara in a rain-ruined draw. In this match Sardar Badshah made the team's highest score of 65.

The captain in all 10 matches was Arif Khattak. He was also their highest run-scorer and wicket-taker, with 268 runs at 14.88 and 14 wickets at 25.64. His 5 for 46 against Rawalpindi in 1983-84 was the only instance of a Dera Ismail Khan bowler taking five wickets in an innings in a national domestic tournament. Khattak was the only player to take part in all of Dera Ismail Khan's matches.

== Current status ==
In 1986-87 the authorities again rearranged the structure of first-class cricket in Pakistan and Dera Ismail Khan dropped out.

The team has continued to play at sub-first-class level. Currently it takes part in the Inter-District Senior Tournament, a three-day national competition.

Dera Ismail Khan did not play any home games when it had first-class status. It now plays its home matches at Gomal University New Campus Ground and the Dera Ismail Khan Cricket Stadium.

== Notable cricketers ==
- Arif Khattak
