= Arif Tabrizi =

Azerbaijani poet

- Born: XVIII century Tabriz
- Died: 1805; Tabriz, Qajar Iran
- Occupation: poet

Arif Tabrizi (Azerbaijani: Arif Təbrizi; b. 18th century, Tabriz – d. Tabriz, Qajar Iran, 1805) was an Azerbaijani-language poet of the 18th–19th centuries, who mainly wrote ghazals.

== Life ==
The date of birth of the poet is still unknown, but it is known that he was born and lived most of his life in the city of Tabriz. In his ghazals, special attention is paid to motifs on the theme of suffering, longing and sadness. Some of his works are collected in the book-collection of the researcher Mirza Huseyn Afandi Qayibov which is called "Collection of poems of famous poets in Azerbaijan" (Azerbaijani:Azərbaycanda məşhur olan şüəranın əşarına məcmuədir). Arif Tabrizi died in 1805, leaving a big mark in Azerbaijani literature.

== See also ==
- Assar Tabrizi

== Sources ==
- Тураев, С. В (1988). История всемирной литературы – Литература XVIII в. ИМЛИ им. А. М. Горького.
- Babayev, A. M. (1993). Azərbaycan klassik ədəbiyyatında işlədilən adların və terminlərin şərhi. Maarif.
