= List of Hazara cricketers =

This is a list of cricketers who played first-class matches for Hazara cricket team, representing the region of Hazara, in Khyber Pakhtunkhwa province, Pakistan. Hazara played nine first-class matches in the Patron's Trophy during the 1983/84, 1984/85 and 1985/1986 seasons.

- Ansaar Ali
- Arshad Khattak
- Arshad Qureshi
- Asghar Khan
- Ashraf Butt
- Asif Aslam
- Awais Qureshi
- Basharat Khan
- Fahim Nawab
- Farooq Khan
- Farrukh Ahmed
- Ijaz Butt
- Imran Khaliq
- Inayatullah
- Javed Ahmed
- Junaid Qureshi
- Kaleem Pasha
- Kashif Kazmi
- Khawar Nadeem
- Kifayat Hussain
- Manzoor Ahmed
- Masood Mirza
- Mohammad Faridoon
- Mohammad Junaid
- Mohammad Zia
- Nadir Khan
- Nasim Fazal
- Rafat Nawaz
- Riaz Ahmed
- Rizwan Bokhari
- Sajid Aziz
- Shahid Iqbal
- Shakir Hussain
- Tahir Mahmood
- Tariq Awan
- Tariq Iqbal
- Wajid Elahi
- Wasim Fazal
- Wasim Hasan
- Wasim Sheikh
