= Arif Acaloğlu =

Azerbaijani-Turkish folklorist and scholar

- Born: Arif Acalov; 10 April 1956; Bolnisi, Soviet Union
- Died: 15 November 2023 (aged 67)
- Other name: Acal
- Education: Baku State University; University of Tartu
- Scientific career
- Fields: Literature; Folklore; Anthropology
- Institutions: Azerbaijan National Academy of Sciences; Istanbul Bilgi University; Yeditepe University; Marmara University
- Doctoral advisors: Juri Lotman; Lev Gumilev

Arif Acaloğlu (Azerbaijani: Arif Acaloğlu, formerly Acalov, Turkish: Arif Acaloğlu, Russian: Aриф Аджалов; 10 April 1956 – 15 November 2023) was an Azerbaijani-Turkish folklorist, Turkologist, anthropologist, translator, and former advisor to the president of Azerbaijan.

== Life ==
Acaloğlu was born to a family of land-owning nobility in Kapanakchi, Borchali region of Georgia, whose members had been actively involved in the intellectual and political life of the Caucasus and beyond. He completed his studies in Azerbaijani literature and folklore at Baku State University in 1982, instructed by figures such as Mir Jalal Pashayev and Mirali Seyidov. Following his graduation, he started working at Azerbaijan National Academy of Sciences and later undertook his doctoral studies in semiotics of culture under the supervision of Juri Lotman at the University of Tartu, while also collaborating with Lev Gumilev on the social and political issues of Eurasia in St. Petersburg. As a prominent Soviet dissident, he was at the forefront of Azerbaijani popular movement for independence. After the dissolution of Soviet Union, he served as an advisor to the president of newly independent Azerbaijan. He continued his academic career later in Turkey, establishing himself in the fields of folk literature and social anthropology.

== Contributions ==
His early works are generally concerned with the semiotic analysis of Azerbaijani and Turkic folk and epic literature, as well as Turkic mythology. In the late eighties, he published works on the epistemological issues of modern folklore, literary criticism, and semiotic analyses of the Book of Dede Korkut and the epic of Oghuz Khagan. In tandem with his textual work, Acaloğlu also conducted ethnographic fieldwork to collect and record samples of oral literature and folk beliefs in Southern Caucasia, Central Asia, Siberia, Afghanistan, and Mongolia. He also published extensively on the contemporary social and political issues in Turkey and Azerbaijan in addition to his academic work, and appeared in several TV programs and interviews. An avid translator, he played a great role in bringing the substantial works of Russian ethnographers and historians and the works of well-known writers from Turkic speaking world into the attention of Turkish readers.

== Selected works ==
- Acalov, А. 1986. Этноконфессиональное Содержание Оппозиции «Свои и Чужие» в Огузcком Эпосе «Книга Моего Деда Коркута». Sign System Studies 19, 155-162.
- Acalov, A. 1988. Azərbaycan Mifoloji Mətnləri. Baku: Azərbaycan Elmlər Akademiyası Nəşriyyatı.
- Acalov, A. 1989. Azərbaycan Folklorşünaslığının Bəzi Epistemoloji Məsələləri. In Azerbaycan Folklorşünaslığı Məsələləri, pp. 3–12.
- Acalov, A. 1993. “Mana Vectevs un mana Gramata”. In Mana vectēva Korkuda gramata, U. Bērziņš. Riga: Liesma, pp. 227–231.
- Acaloğlu, A. 2005. Türk Destanlarının Kökenlerine Dair. Modern Türklük Araştırmaları Dergisi 2(4), 144-157.
- Acaloğlu, А. 2009. Мифология Евразии в Этнокультурном Контексте (По Материалам Тюркской Мифологии). SOPHIA 2(3), 82-111.
- Acaloğlu, A. 2018. Mitten Eposa Türk Destanlarının Kültürel Kahramanları. In İslam Medeniyeti Bağlamında Türk Dünyası, O. Kılıçer & O. Sapashev. Istanbul: Demavend, 76-89.
- Acaloğlu, A. 2020. Problems and Solutions in the Karabakh Conflict: from Beginning to Today. BRIQ 2(1), 77-93.
