= Arif Alasgar =

Azerbaijani painter

Arif Alasgar Arif Ələsgər
- Born: Arif Məmmədhüseyn oğlu Ələsgərov; 18 March 1944 (age 82); Baku, Azerbaijan SSR
- Citizenship: USSR, Azerbaijan, Turkey
- Education: Saint Petersburg Art and Industry Academy (1964-1970)
- Occupations: Painter, art professor
- Employer(s): Azerbaijan State University of Culture and Arts (1977-2001); Azerbaijan State Academy of Fine Arts (2001-2008); Karadeniz Technical University (2008-present)
- Awards: Honored Art Worker (Azerbaijan) (1992)

Arif Ələsgər (Azerbaijani: Arif Məmmədhüseyn oğlu Ələsgərov; born 18 March 1944) is a painter and Honored Art Worker of Azerbaijan.

== Biography ==
Arif Alasgar was born in Baku on 18 March 1944. He studied at Saint Petersburg Art and Industry Academy from 1964 to 1970. In 1975, he joined the Artists' Union of the USSR. From 1977 to 2001 he worked as a teacher, senior lecturer, and associate professor at Azerbaijan State University of Culture and Arts. From 2001 to 2008 he worked as the Head of department at the Azerbaijan State Academy of Fine Arts and received the title of professor. He has been Professor and Head of the Department of Art at the Karadeniz Technical University in Turkey since 2008. The artist is also the author of textbooks "History of Estamp and Ofort" and "Composition in Design" published in 2001–2003. He was awarded the title of Honored Art Worker of Azerbaijan in 1992.

Alasgar's main theme in his art is Baku and Absheron. Graphics play an important role in his creativity. His works are displayed in the National Art Museum of Azerbaijan and in the State Museum of Oriental Art in Moscow, and are held in private collections in Turkey, France, Poland, Hungary, Italy, England and other countries.

Some of his best-known paintings include "Wrestling", "Jugglers", "Old City", "Old Bayil", "Memories", "The World of Fuzuli", "Autumn", "Erzurum", "The Beginning of Life", and "Music Workshop".

His Anniversary Exhibition was held in October 2014 in Baku.

Arif Alasgar currently lives in Turkey.
