= Arif Guliyev =

Azerbaijani actor (1950–2021)

Arif Guliyev Arif Quliyev
- Born: May 16, 1950; Ali-Bayramli, Azerbaijan SSR, USSR
- Died: May 7, 2021 (aged 70); Baku, Azerbaijan
- Occupation: Actor
- Years active: 1974–2021
- Awards: People's Artiste of Azerbaijan; Honored Artist of the Azerbaijan SSR; Lenin Komsomol Prize; Humay Award; Senetkar Award

Arif Ali oghlu Guliyev (Azerbaijani: Arif Əli oğlu Quliyev, May 16, 1950 — May 7, 2021) was an actor, Honored Artist of the Azerbaijan SSR (1989), People's Artiste of Azerbaijan (1993).

== Biography ==
Arif Guliyev was born in 1950 in Ali-Bayramli. In 1965, he entered the drama and film acting faculty of the Baku Cultural-Educational Technical College. In 1968, he graduated from the technical school and was assigned to work at the Mingachevir State Drama Theater. In 1973–1979, he studied at the Faculty of Musical Comedy Acting of the Azerbaijan State Art Institute. In 1975, he was invited to the Musical Comedy Theater. He worked at the Yerevan State Azerbaijan Dramatic Theater. Since 1988, he was the artistic director of the Private Satire Theater.

The actor died on May 7, 2021, due to COVID-19.

== Awards ==
- Lenin Komsomol Prize, Azerbaijan SSR — 1982
- Honored Artist of the Azerbaijan SSR — 1989
- People's Artiste of Azerbaijan — 1993
- Humay Award — 1993
- "Qızıl Dərviş" (Golden Dervish) Award — 2006
- "Zirvə" Award — 2012
- "Senetkar" (Master) Award — 2015
