= Assar Tabrizi =

14th century Iranian poet

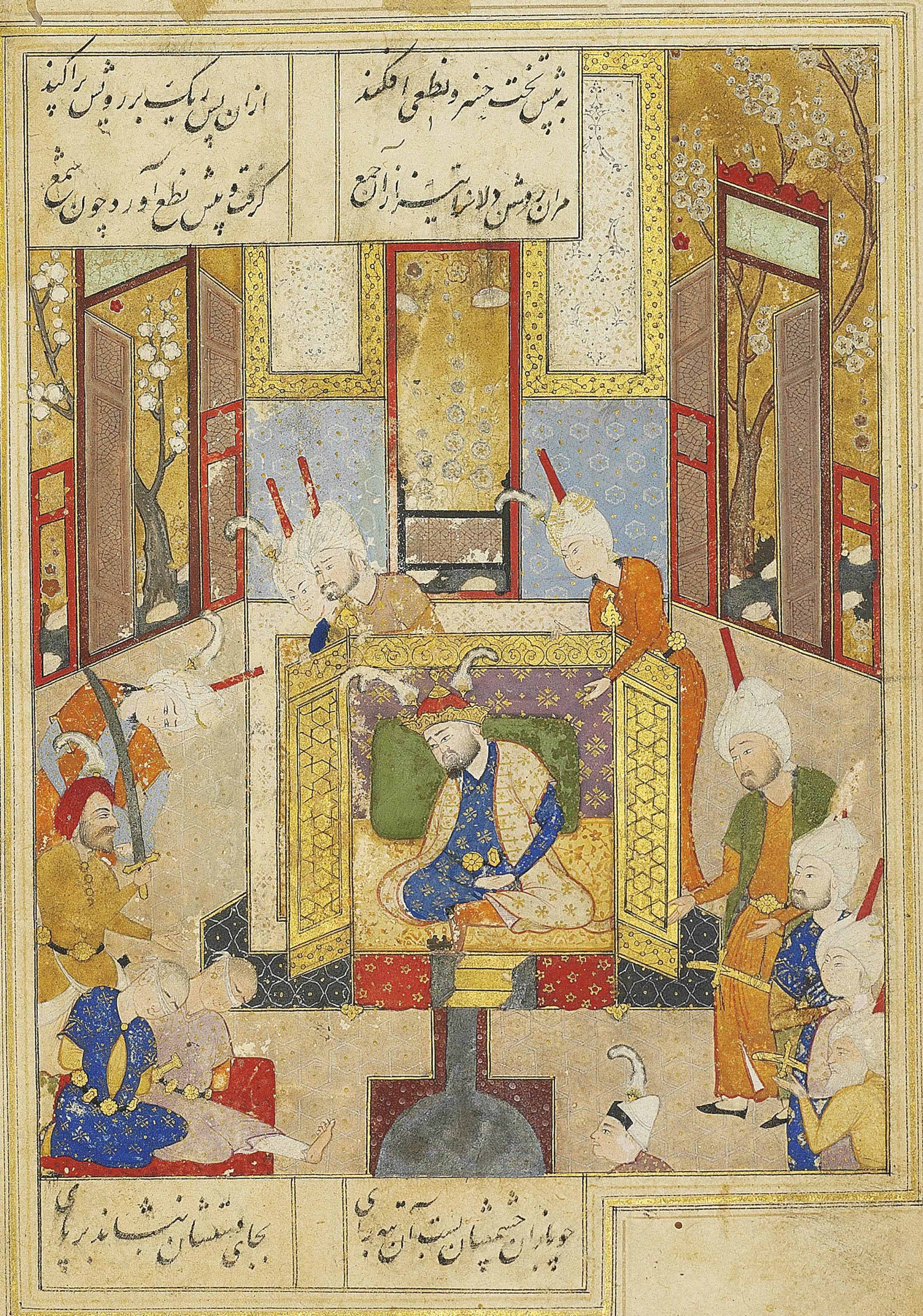
"Mushtari and Badr await execution before King Shapur", an illustration from a copy of the Mihr o Mushtari of Assar Tabrizi. Created in Tabriz, Safavid Iran, dated c. 1520

Assar Tabrizi (died in 1377 or 1382) was a Persian poet from Tabriz, who served as one of the panegyrists of the Jalayirid ruler Shaykh Uways Jalayir (r. 1356–1374). He is principally known for his poem Mihr u Mushtari, which was completed in 1376.

== Biography ==
Assar was born in Tabriz under the Ilkhanate. He studied astronomy with Abd al-Samad Tabrizi, and Sufism with Shaykh Majd al-Din Sisi. Following the death of Abu Sa'id Bahadur Khan (r. 1316–1335) in 1335, the Ilkhanate fell. The northwestern region of Azerbaijan was soon captured by the Jalayirids, who were based in Baghdad. Assar became one of the panegyrists of the Jalayirid ruler Shaykh Uways Jalayir (r. 1356–1374), dedicating some qasidas (odes) to him. In his poem Mihr u Mushtari, Assar says that he disliked writing panegyrics, rarely reciting the ones he had written. The poem, entitled Ishq-nama, but commonly known as Mihr u Mushtari, was composed in 1376, and is the most famous work of Assar. It was translated into Turkish twice, once by Ibn Umm Walad (died 1502), and then later by Pir Muhammad Azmi and his son Halati (died 1629), who dedicated it to the Ottoman sultan Selim II (r. 1566–1574).

Besides poetry, Assar has also written a few treatises on rhetoric, as well as a short manual of Persian rhymes, named al-Wāfī fī teʿdād al-qawāfī. The death date of Assar is uncertain. He either died in 1377 or 1382.

== Sources ==
- Safa, Z. (1987). "ʿAṣṣār Tabrīzī". In Yarshater, Ehsan (ed.). Encyclopædia Iranica. Vol. II/8: Aśoka IV–Āṯār al-Wozarāʾ. London and New York: Routledge & Kegan Paul. p. 803. ISBN 978-0-71009-108-6.
- Massé, H. (1960). "ʿAṣṣār". In Gibb, H. A. R.; Kramers, J. H.; Lévi-Provençal, E.; Schacht, J.; Lewis, B. & Pellat, Ch. (eds.). The Encyclopaedia of Islam, Second Edition. Volume I: A–B. Leiden: E. J. Brill. p. 720. OCLC 495469456.
