= Arif Budimanta =

Indonesian politician (1968–2025)

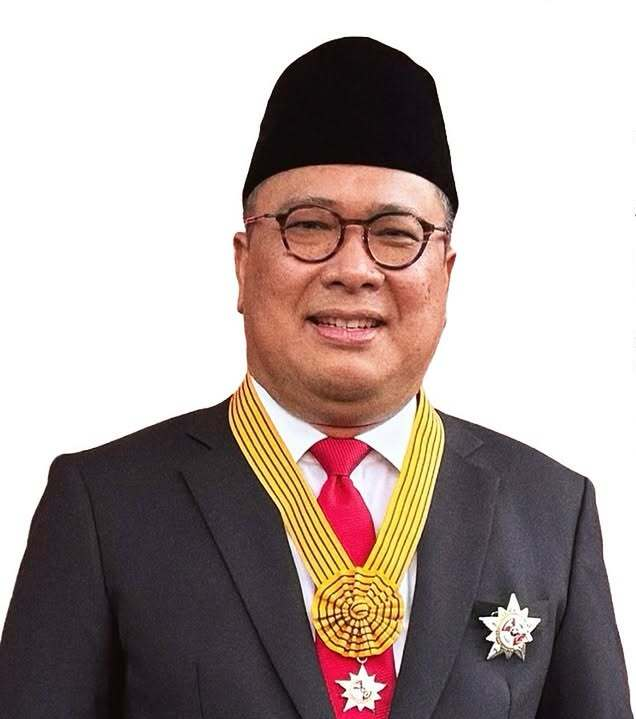
- Arif in 2024

Vice Chairman of the Indonesian National Economic and Industry Committee
- In office 19 January 2016 – 26 November 2020
- President: Joko Widodo
- Preceded by: None
- Succeeded by: Abolished

Member of House of Representatives
- In office 1 October 2009 – 30 September 2014
- Constituency: West Java III

Personal details
- Born: Arif Budimanta Sebayang; 15 March 1968 Medan, Sumatera Utara, Indonesia
- Died: 6 September 2025 (aged 57) Jakarta, Indonesia
- Party: Indonesian Democratic Party of Struggle
- Education: IPB University; University of Indonesia
- Occupation: Economist; Lecturer; Writer; Politician

Arif Budimanta (15 March 1968 – 6 September 2025) was an Indonesian politician who was the vice chairman of the Indonesian National Economic and Industry Committee, a body that was formed in 2016 to support the success of the President Cabinet in determining the economic and industrial policy. In that capacity he was also the Senior Advisor for Minister of Finance; Lecturer of Graduate Program University of Indonesia (UI); Member of the Royal Economic Society (RES) London; Founder and Senior Advisor Indonesian Center for Sustainable Development (ICSD); Executive Director of The Megawati Institute from 2008 till now.

Arif was elected as the Member of Indonesian Parliament (DPR RI) in 2009–2014. Arif Budimanta obtained his PhD from University of Indonesia, then studied Finance in University of Chicago and Leadership for Senior Executive Programme in Harvard Business School (HBS).

He had long experience as a consultant in Mining, Oil, Gas and Development. Prior to this, he was an expert staff member of PT. Timah (Persero) Tbk on sustainable development and corporate social responsibility.

Arif died on 6 September 2025, at the age of 57.
