= Arif Ozakca =

British artist (born 1979)

Arif Ozakca (Turkish: Arif Özakça) (born 1979 in London, England) is a British artist who combines montages with painting. His work is influenced by his Anglo-Turkish-Cypriot heritage by emphasising the differences between Ottoman culture and Baroque culture; thus, his work illustrates the experience of living between two cultures in two worlds. In 2009, Ozakca participated in a group exhibition called the "Newspeak: British Art Now" which was organized by Saatchi Gallery at the Hermitage Museum in St. Petersburg.
