= Silk Way Airlines Flight 995 =

Aviation accident in Afghanistan

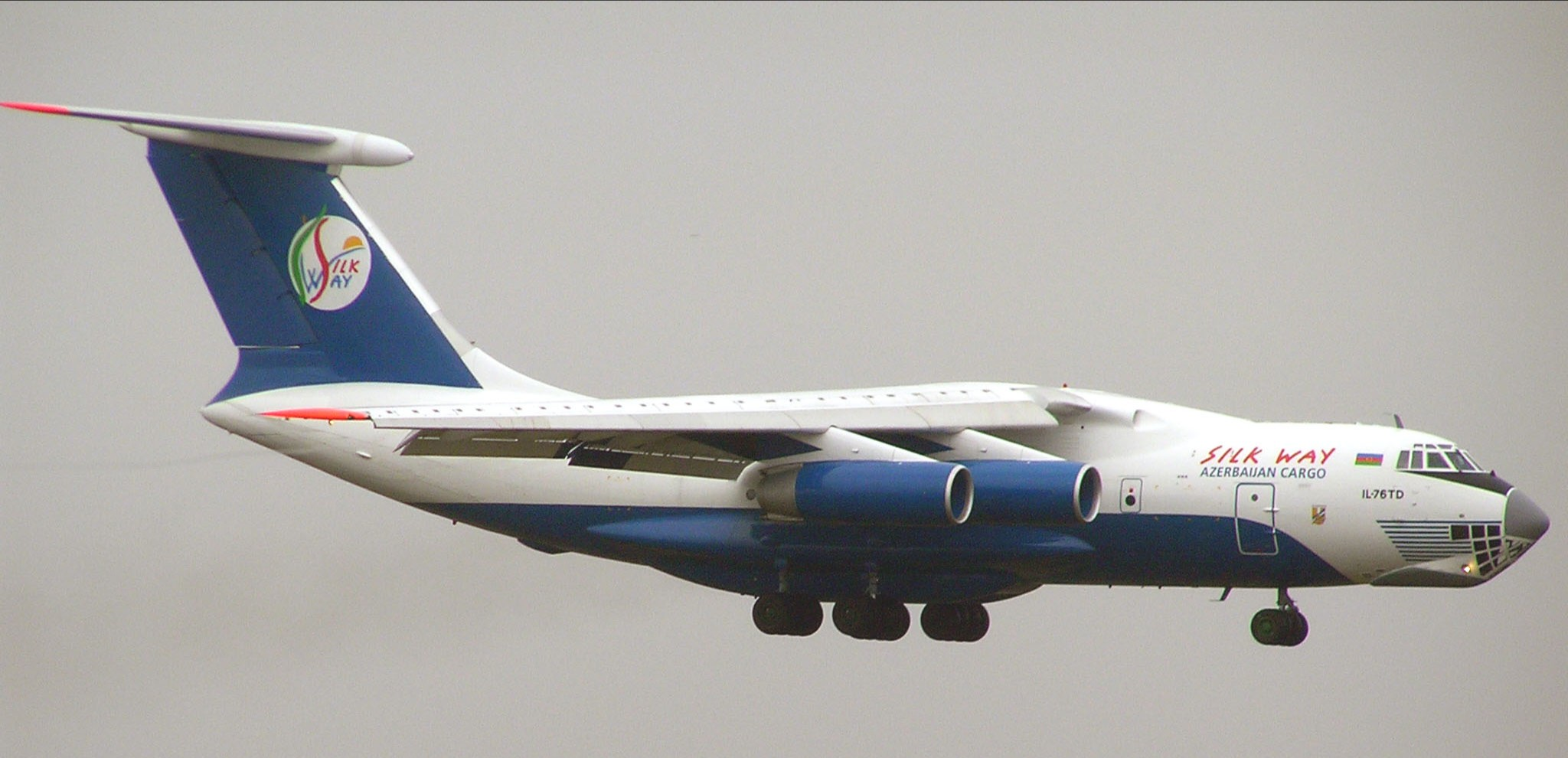
- 4K-AZ55, the aircraft involved, seen at Cologne Bonn Airport in 2005

Accident
- Date: 6 July 2011
- Summary: Controlled flight into terrain
- Site: Ghorband District, approx. 40 km SW of Bagram Airfield, Afghanistan

Aircraft
- Aircraft type: Ilyushin Il-76TD
- Operator: Silk Way Airlines
- ICAO flight No.: CMB995
- Call sign: CAMBER 995
- Registration: 4K-AZ55
- Flight origin: Heydar Aliyev International Airport, Baku, Azerbaijan
- Destination: Bagram Airfield, Bagram, Afghanistan
- Occupants: 9
- Crew: 9
- Fatalities: 9
- Survivors: 0

On 6 July 2011, a Silk Way Airlines Ilyushin Il-76 cargo aircraft on a flight from Baku, Azerbaijan, to Bagram Air Base in Afghanistan, crashed into a mountainside at an altitude of 3,800 metres (12,500 ft) while descending at night towards Bagram. All nine people on board were killed.

Despite initial claims by Taliban rebels that they had shot down the aircraft, an investigation found no evidence of external interference, while analysis of the flight recorders suggested the crash was a case of controlled flight into terrain.

== Accident ==
The Il-76 had taken off from Heydar Aliyev International Airport in Baku at 21:26 local time (16:26 UTC) on 5 July, with 18 tonnes of cargo destined for the International Security Assistance Force (ISAF) in Bagram. It was scheduled to land at Bagram at 01:40 local time on 6 July (21:10 on 5 July UTC).

Shortly before arriving at Bagram, the flight disappeared from radar. An air traffic controller in the Afghan capital Kabul, around 40 km (25 mi) away from Bagram, reported seeing a flash in the sky at an altitude of about 4,000 m (13,000 ft) some 25 km (16 mi) away.

It was later confirmed that the aircraft had struck a mountainside at around 3,800 metres (12,500 ft) of altitude. No distress call was received from the crew before contact was lost. The same aircraft had recently flown from Kuwait to Baku without any problem.

The wreckage of the Il-76 was located the following day in the Ghorband District, around 50 km (31 mi) north-west of Kabul. All nine people on board had perished.

== Aircraft ==
The aircraft involved was an Ilyushin Il-76TD with Azerbaijani registration 4K-AZ55, serial number 2053420680. Built in 2005, it was operated by Silk Way Holding, a company linked to Azerbaijan Airlines. The aircraft had received its last full technical inspection in February 2011 and had passed a regular technical inspection one month prior to the crash.

== Crew ==
Reports on the nationality of the crew varied, with some reporting five Azerbaijanis and four Uzbeks, while others six Azerbaijanis and three Uzbeks. The pilots in control of the plane were Uzbek captain Sergei Kuzmin aged 42, Azerbaijani first officer Oleg Morshikhin aged 32, Uzbek flight engineer Vladimir Shatobin aged 52, and Uzbek navigator Igor Zheng aged 44.Captain Kuzmin had logged about 4,500 hours at the time of the accident. Also on the plane was an additional crew, consisting of radio operators Elnur Mahmudov and Ahmedjian Khajayev, along with mechanics Afghan Rahimov, Mehman Huseynov and on-board operator Tapdig Gahramanov.

== Aftermath ==
Taliban spokesman Zabiullah Mujahid stated that the aircraft had been shot down by Taliban rebels who believed it was carrying a shipment of weapons, but Afghan local authorities denied any Taliban involvement.

Despite ISAF stating that no Taliban activity had been reported in the affected area at the time of the crash, several attempts to reach the crash site were met with gunfire. The Azerbaijani ambassador to Afghanistan and Pakistan considered that reports indicating technical problems with the aircraft were not true, and that in his opinion the Taliban were indeed responsible for its loss.

Silk Way Airlines temporarily halted its operations to Afghanistan following the accident, resuming them on 21 July.

== Investigation ==
An investigative commission was set up by the Afghanistan Civil Aviation Authority, assisted by Azerbaijani authorities and by Russia's Interstate Aviation Committee (IAC).

On 25 July, the remains of the crew members were delivered to the Association of Forensic Medical Examination and Pathological Anatomy of the Ministry of Health of Azerbaijan in Baku.

On 15 August, the cockpit voice recorder (CVR) was sent to Moscow. Members of the IAC and representatives of Afghanistan, Azerbaijan and Uzbekistan successfully downloaded the recorded information. Analysis of the CVR suggested that at the time of the crash, the aircraft was under the captain's command, and that contrary to normal practice, he was flying visually and without assistance from Bagram air traffic control.

The vice-president of the investigative commission also stated that the aircraft had deviated from the established route.

== See also ==
- List of aviation accidents and incidents in the war in Afghanistan
- Taliban insurgency
