= Arif Wibowo =

Indonesian politician

Arif Wibowo (born June 29, 1968) is an Indonesian politician, who is currently serving as a member of the People's Representative Council since 2009, representing the East Java IV constituency as a member of the Indonesian Democratic Party of Struggle. He is assigned to the Second Commission which handles local government matters in Indonesia, including regional autonomy, the Indonesian Ministry of Home Affairs, the National Land Agency and the General Elections Commission. He was also known as a leader in the Indonesian National Student Movement at the University of Jember.

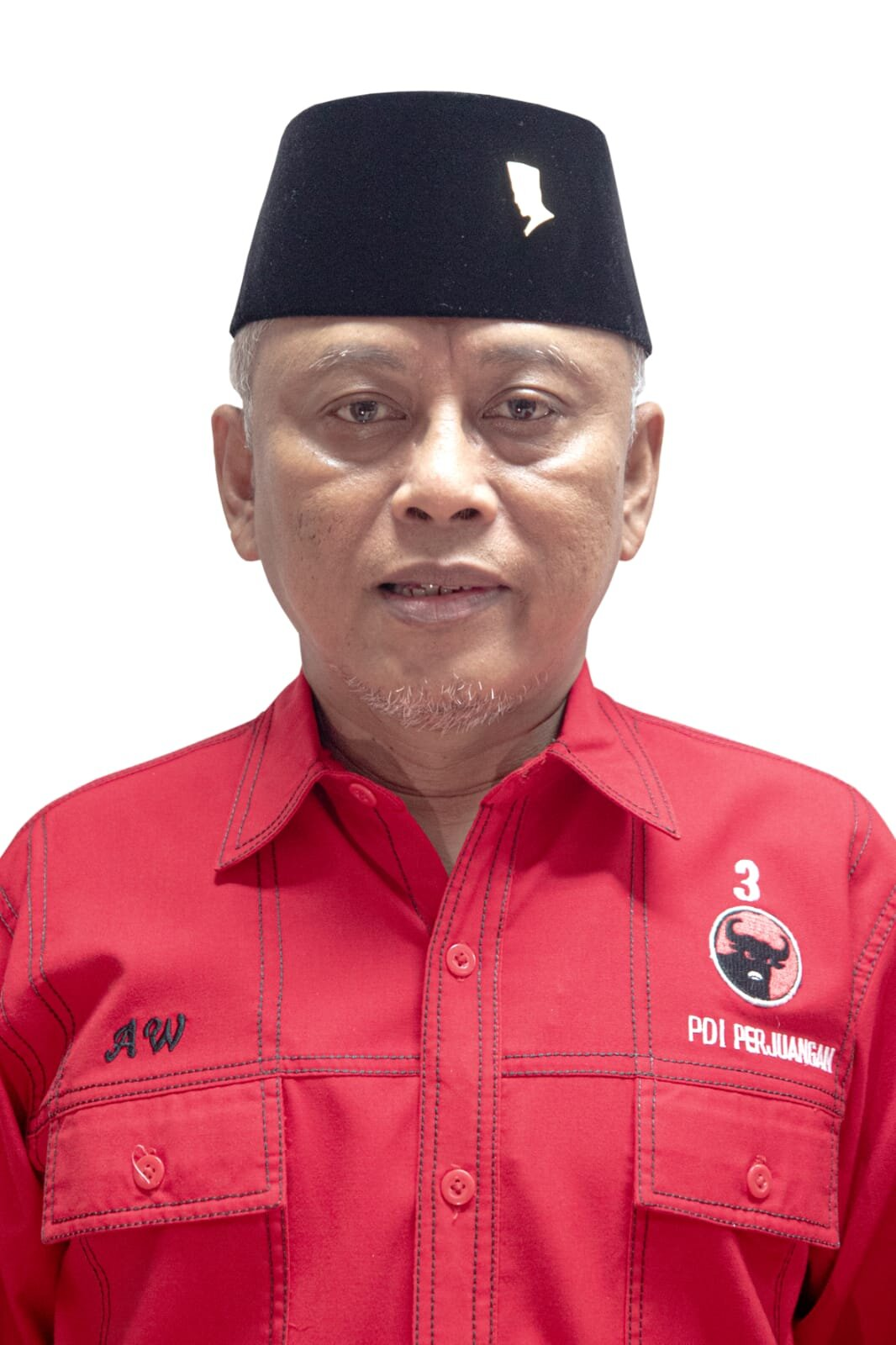
