= Arif Taşdelen =

German politician (born 1974)

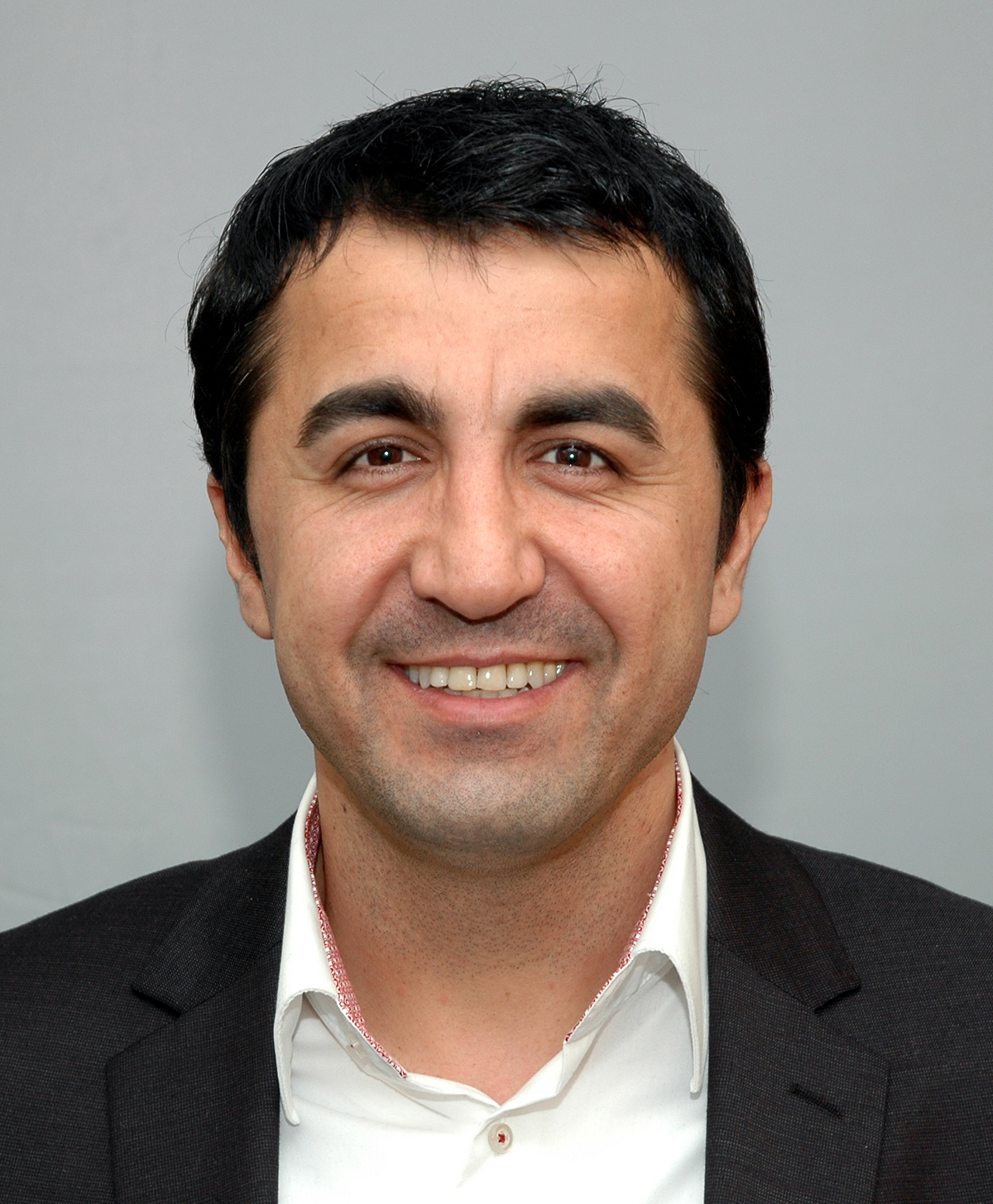
- Taşdelen in 2013

Member of the Landtag of Bavaria
- Incumbent
- Assumed office 7 October 2013
- Constituency: Middle Franconia

Personal details
- Born: 1 July 1974 (age 51)
- Party: Social Democratic Party (since 1998)

Arif Taşdelen (born 1 July 1974) is a Turkish-born German politician serving as a member of the Landtag of Bavaria since 2013. He has served as deputy group leader of the Social Democratic Party since 2021.
