= Arif Anis =

Author, Motivational Speaker

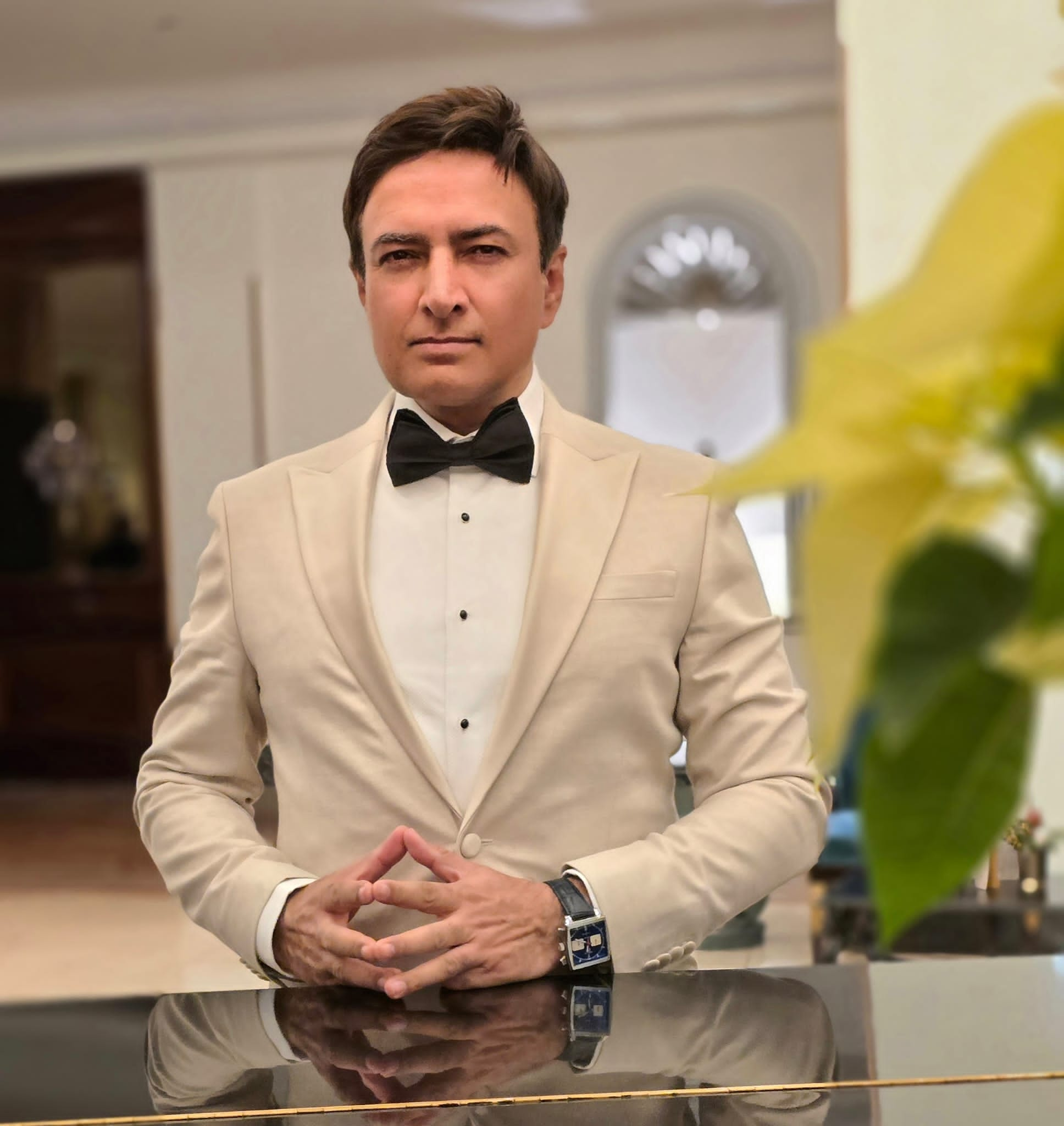
- Born: Soon Valley, Punjab
- Education: University of Punjab, LUMS, Imperial College London, Oxford University, Harvard University
- Occupations: Leadership Expert; author; professional coach
- Writing career
- Notable work: I’MPOSSIBLE (2014) Made in Crises (2020)
- Notable awards: Points of Light, Freeman of the City of London
- Website: www.arifanis.com

Arif Anis MBE (Urdu: عارف انیس) is a British leadership consultant and author.

Anis was appointed The Most Excellent Member of the Order of the British Empire (MBE) in the 2023 Birthday Honours for services to leadership and community work. He has also received a UK Points of Light award, the Freedom of the City of London, and recognition through the Queen’s Award for his philanthropic and humanitarian initiatives. He has served as Minister Counsellor to the Andean Parliament. He is the author and co-author of books on leadership, psychology, strategy, and crisis leadership, including ‘‘Habits of Success’’, which appeared on the ‘‘USA Today’’ and ‘‘The Wall Street Journal’’ bestseller lists.

== Early life and education ==
Anis was born in Angah, Soon Valley, Punjab, Pakistan. He was raised as a shepherd by his veteran father who had served in the British Army and later in the Pakistani Army. Anis graduated from the Government Emerson College in Psychology and Philosophy and received his master's degree in Clinical Psychology from the Applied Psychology Department of the University of Punjab. He received executive education from Lahore University of Management Sciences (LUMS), Imperial College London, Oxford University and Harvard University.

== Career ==
Anis was selected in the Civil Services of Pakistan and joined the 29th Common as an Assistant Commissioner in 2002. He served at various positions in the Federal Board of Revenue as a Deputy Commissioner. Later, he continued pursuing his career in the learning and development industry as a global professional speaker. He also served as an ‘Economic Senator’ for two years at the European Economic Senate. His work has been featured in the BBC, ITV, Sky, Telegraph, CNBC, Yahoo and MSN.

Anis commissioned one poll to YouGov in 2013 that produced a survey report which has been globally referenced on ‘the British attitudes to the Pakistani Diaspora’. Anis founded the World Congress of Overseas Pakistanis as an outcome of this survey to build bridges across the communities. The WCOP signature initiatives include Integration Dinners, Leaders of Tomorrow Congress and Women Achievers Congress. The WCOP projects attracted support from the most effective circles in the UK, Pakistan and worldwide. Speakers at the WCOP conferences include British Prime Minister Theresa May, Prime Minister David Cameron, Prime Minister Imran Khan, Prime Minister Shahbaz Sharif, former British Deputy Prime Minister Nick Clegg, Rt. Hon. Baroness Sayeeda Warsi, Rt. Hon Simon Hughes, Secretary of State Rt. Hon. Sajid Javed and the Archbishop of Canterbury Rt. Hon Rowan Williams. Chief Justice of Pakistan and the Joints Chief of Staff have also spoken at the WCOP events.

Anis campaigned for setting up speedy trial courts for overseas Pakistanis to ensure their expeditious disposal for many years until a High Court Bench was formed.

== Awards & honours ==
- King Charles III awarded Arif Anis the royal honours of the Most Excellent Order of the British Empire (MBE) in June 2023 for his services during the COVID pandemic.
- Arif Anis became Freeman of the City of London in April 2022 in recognition of his work during the pandemic.
- He has received Points of Light award by British Prime Minister Boris Johnson for his One Million Meals campaign in May 2021.
- He was voted the ‘Brain of the Year 2020’ by Tony Buzan’s Brain Trust in November 2020 for his ‘One Million Meals’ campaign for the NHS staff and keyworkers. The campaign was backed up by the world-famous British footballer David Beckham

== Publications ==
He co-authored ‘Made in Crises’ on crisis leadership written from the perspective of the Coronavirus pandemic and its impact on global leadership. ISBN 9781982256388

He edited ‘The Teacher’ with Tony Buzan.

Arif Anis's anthology ‘Habits of Success’ became Wall Street Journal and USA Today's bestselling book.
