= Arif Khattak =

Pakistani cricketer

Personal information
- Full name: Arif Mahmood Khattak
- Born: 10 November 1961 (age 65); Dera Ismail Khan, Pakistan
- Batting: Right-handed
- Bowling: Right-arm off-spin

Domestic team information
- Years: Team
- 1983–84 to 1985–86: Dera Ismail Khan

Career statistics
Competition	First-class
Matches	10
Runs scored	268
Batting average	14.88
100s/50s	0/1
Top score	59
Balls bowled	660
Wickets	14
Bowling average	25.64
5 wickets in innings	1
10 wickets in match	0
Best bowling	5/46
Catches/stumpings	2/–
- Source: Cricket Archive, 7 January 2014

Arif Mahmood Khattak (born 10 November 1961) is a Pakistani former cricketer who played first-class cricket for Dera Ismail Khan from 1983–84 to 1985–86. He was the team captain in all 10 of his first-class matches.

When the Pakistan Cricket Board expanded the BCCP Patron's Trophy for the 1983–84 season, Dera Ismail Khan were one of several teams promoted to first-class status, and at the age of 21 Arif Khattak was appointed captain. None of Dera Ismail Khan's players had previously played first-class cricket. Over the next three seasons the team played 10 matches, losing nine (eight of them by an innings) and drawing one, and failing to reach 100 in 10 of their 19 innings.

Khattak was the only player to appear in all ten matches. He was also Dera Ismail Khan's highest run-scorer and wicket-taker, with 268 runs at 14.88 and 14 wickets at 25.64. His 5 for 46 against Rawalpindi in 1983–84 was the only instance of a Dera Ismail Khan bowler taking five wickets in an innings in a national domestic tournament. His 59 against Peshawar earlier that season was one of only two fifties scored by the team's batsmen. He top-scored for Dera Ismail Khan five times.

Khattak was selected to play for a North Zone team in a two-day match against the touring Sri Lankan Under-23 team in February 1984, but with little success.

In 1986 the Pakistan Cricket Board again rearranged the structure of first-class cricket in Pakistan and Dera Ismail Khan dropped out. Khattak played no more first-class cricket.
