= Arif Hasan (journalist) =

Bangladeshi television executive

- Occupation: Television executive
- Known for: Managing Director of Desh TV

Arif Hasan is a Bangladeshi television executive who serves as the managing director of Desh TV, a private television channel in Bangladesh. He is also the General Secretary of the Association of Television Channel Owners. He was detained after the fall of the Sheikh Hasina-led Awami League government. His arrest was part of a larger trend of replacing previous journalists and editors in mainstream media organizations with those loyal to the Bangladesh Nationalist Party and the Bangladesh Jamaat-e-Islami.

== Career ==
In 2011, Hasan was the Deputy Managing Director of Desh TV.

The Supreme Court chamber judge has stayed a High Court order that directed the release of 15 frozen bank accounts belonging to Hasan, then Desh TV managing director, and his company Hasan Telecom, until 21 August 2023. The accounts were frozen in 2020 following an Anti-Corruption Commission investigation into alleged suspicious transactions and money laundering. The Anti-Corruption Commission challenged the High Court verdict, and the matter will now be heard by the full bench of the Appellate Division on August 21. In October, the Bangladesh Supreme Court ordered the Anti-Corruption Commission to submit its report on money laundering allegation against Hasan.

In September 2024, Orion Group filed a 10 billion BDT defamation case against Desh TV. In November, Hasan was elected general secretary of the Association of Television Channel Owners. But no presidential candidate was elected as both candidates, Mohammad Mosaddak Ali and Abdul Haque, received the same number of votes.

On 16 November 2024, Hasan was detained from Hazrat Shahjalal International Airport while trying to leave the country. Hasan was placed on a two-day police remand by a metropolitan magistrate court in Dhaka in connection with a case filed over an alleged attempted murder during the protests against former Prime Minister Sheikh Hasina on 19 July 2024. According to police, Arif Hasan was detained by Airport Police while reportedly trying to leave the country. He was later handed over to the Detective Branch of the Dhaka Metropolitan Police. The remand was sought to interrogate Hasan about the whereabouts of other accused individuals in the case. Journalist couple Farzana Rupa and Shakil Ahmed were also detained around the same time.

The case was filed by the father of a protester named Md Sajib, who was injured during an attack on a student procession near Uttara Scholastica School on 19 July. The attack was allegedly carried out by activists affiliated with the ruling Awami League and its associate organisations. Sajib was among several injured and was admitted to Uttara Adhunik Hospital. Hasan's defence claimed that he was not present at the scene of the incident and that the case was an attempt to harass him. The court denied bail and granted a two-day remand. In February 2025, the Anti-Corruption Commission recommended filing embezzlement charges against Hasan over various loans from banks, including loans to his company, Hasan Telecom. They filed the charges against Hasan and officials of the National Bank Limited, including directors Monowara Sikder, and Parveen Haque Sikder. Dhaka Metropolitan Senior Special Judge Md Zakir Hossain Galib issued a travel ban against Hasan.

== See also ==
- Persecution of Journalists under Bangladesh's Interim Government (2024–25)
