= State Civil Aviation Agency (Azerbaijan) =

State Civil Aviation Agency of the Republic of Azerbaijan
- Azərbaycan Respublikasının Dövlət Mülki Aviasiya Agentliyi
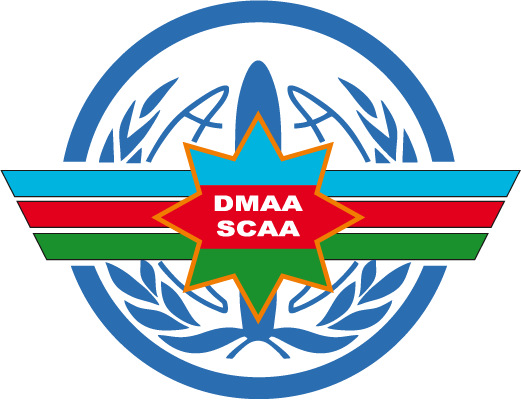

Agency overview
- Formed: December 29, 2006
- Headquarters: 11 Azadlyg Avenue, Baku, Republic of Azerbaijan AZ1044
- Agency executive: Director of State Civil Aviation Administration
- Child agencies: Office of the Higher Attestation Commission; Commission for Certification and Licensing of Subjects of Civil Aviation
- Website: http://www.caa.gov.az/

The State Civil Aviation Agency of the Republic of Azerbaijan (Azerbaijani: Azərbaycan Respublikasının Dövlət Mülki Aviasiya Agentliyi) is a governmental agency within the Cabinet of Azerbaijan in charge of regulating activities in the sphere of civil aviation in Republic of Azerbaijan.

== History ==
The State Civil Aviation Administration was established by the Presidential Decree No. 512 on December 29, 2006 with the purpose of regulation and improvement of civil aviation on the territory of Azerbaijan and development of cooperation with international aviation.

Within the framework of presidential decree dated January 12, 2018, the State Civil Aviation Administration has been transferred to the Ministry as State Civil Aviation Agency under the Ministry of Transport, Communications and High Technologies of Azerbaijan.

== See also ==
- Cabinet of Azerbaijan
- List of airports in Azerbaijan
- Azerbaijan Airlines
