= Maarif =

Maarif in Semitic languages relates to the basal root ARF (West, Plan, Goal, Fortune, Knowledge)

it also may refer to one of these places:

- Maârif, arrondissement of Casablanca, Morocco
- Maarif, Algeria
- Maarif, Azerbaijan
