= Arif Durrani =

Pakistani businessman

Arif Ali Durrani (born c. 1949 in Pakistan) is a Pakistani businessman who has twice been convicted by US courts of selling arms to Iran.

== Background ==
Durrani was the son of a Pakistan Army ordnance officer who died in 1971. Durrani moved to the United States in 1973, settling first in New York and later California. He gained an MBA from the University of Southern California.

== Career ==
In February 1984 Durrani formed a company, Merex Corp, which traded in parts for military and commercial aircraft, and by his own account reached sales of $16m in 1986. He was arrested in October 1986 and subsequently convicted of trading Hawk missile parts to Iran, in what Durrani maintained were actions authorised by leading US government figures (specifically, Oliver North) as part of the Iran-Contra affair with the specific aim of his shipment leading to the freeing of US hostages held in Lebanon. In denying Durrani bail, the judge described him as "enjoy[ing] an exorbitant lifestyle replete with material luxuries and one which causes him to travel the globe to meet with his business associates." Durrani was sentenced to 10 years (and a $2m fine), and released after five years, in September 1992. Durrani said that many of his deals were financed via Bank of Credit and Commerce International. Durrani continued to protest his innocence after his release, arguing that he was working on transactions approved by the US and Israeli governments.

On 30 September 1992, Durrani testified to the United States House of Representatives' October Surprise Task Force regarding public statements he made that members of Ronald Reagan's presidential campaign met with Iranian officials to influence the outcome of the 1980 United States presidential election by delaying the release of American hostages. He had previously told journalists Robert Parry and Robert Ross that the head of the Iran's Revolutionary Guards, Mohsen Rafiqdust, told him of a meeting between Iranian and United States officials in Madrid, Spain. In an on-camera interview for Frontline aired in April 1991, Durrani elaborated stating that Rafiqdust, Mohsen Reza'i, and officials with the Revolutionary Guards told him a meeting between Mehdi Karroubi and Central Intelligence Agency Director William Casey in Spain. According to Gary Sick, Durrani had learned about the meeting from Rafiqdust, Reza'i, and Hamid Nagashian. Durrani recanted these claims during his deposition to the Task Force. He denied telling Robert Parry and Robert Ross that his contacts with the Revolutionary Guard told him about meetings between Iranian and US officials, said his on-air comments had been taken out of context or that he had misunderstood the reporter's question, and said that Sick's report was "incorrect".

In 2006 Durrani was again convicted of selling arms to Iran, and sentenced to more than 12 years in prison. In 2007, he was in custody at the Federal Correctional Institution, Victorville. Durrani was released from prison on May 5, 2016.
