= Silk Way Airlines =

Azerbaijani cargo airline

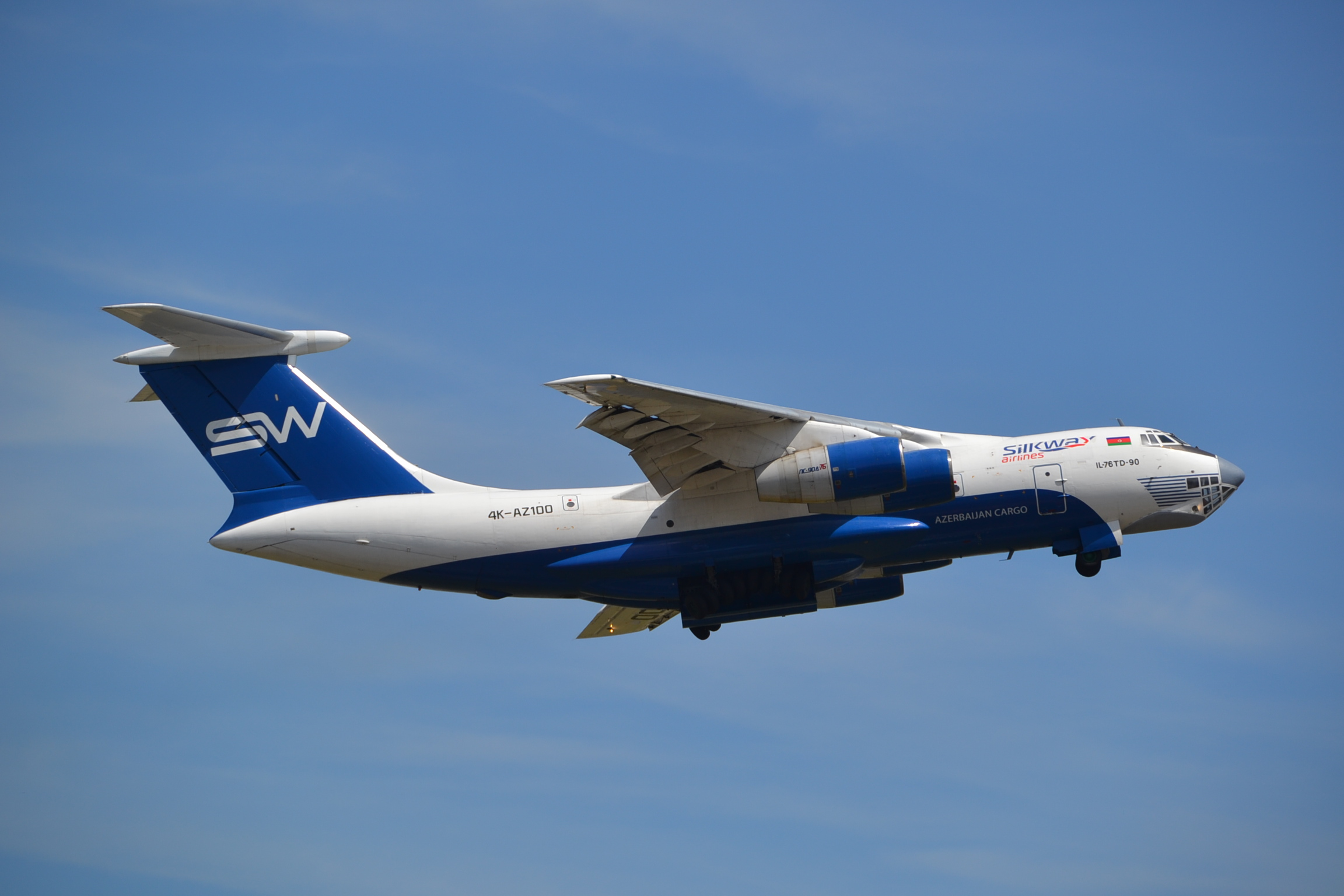
IATA	ICAO	Call sign
ZP	AZQ	SILK LINE
- Founded: 2001; 25 years ago
- Hubs: Heydar Aliyev International Airport
- Fleet size: 5
- Destinations: 31
- Parent company: Silk Way Group
- Headquarters: Baku, Azerbaijan
- Revenue: ▲US$1,997,798,823 (2022)
- Operating income: ▼US$634,651,176 (2022)
- Net income: ▲US$571,761,764 (2022)
- Total assets: ▲US$1,824,218,234 (2022)
- Total equity: ▲US$888,894,705 (2022)
- Website: silkwayairlines.com

Notes
- Financials As of 31 December 2022. Reference

Silk Way Airlines is an Azerbaijani private cargo airline with its head office and flight operations at Heydar Aliyev International Airport in Baku. It operates freight services to Asia, the Middle East and Europe, as well as services for government and non-governmental organisations. The airline is part of the Silk Way Group.

The company is owned by a former Azerbaijan state official, Zaur Akhundov. The company's ownership has been linked to the ruling Aliyev family in Azerbaijan.

== History ==
=== Foundation ===
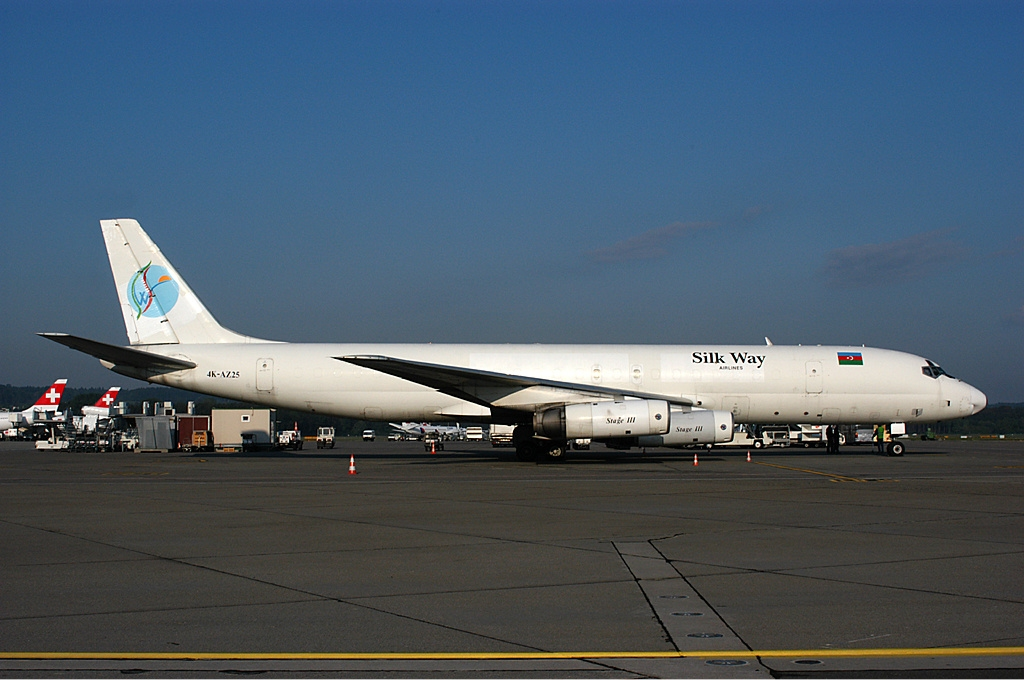
A Silk Way Airlines Douglas DC-8 at Zurich Airport in 2003

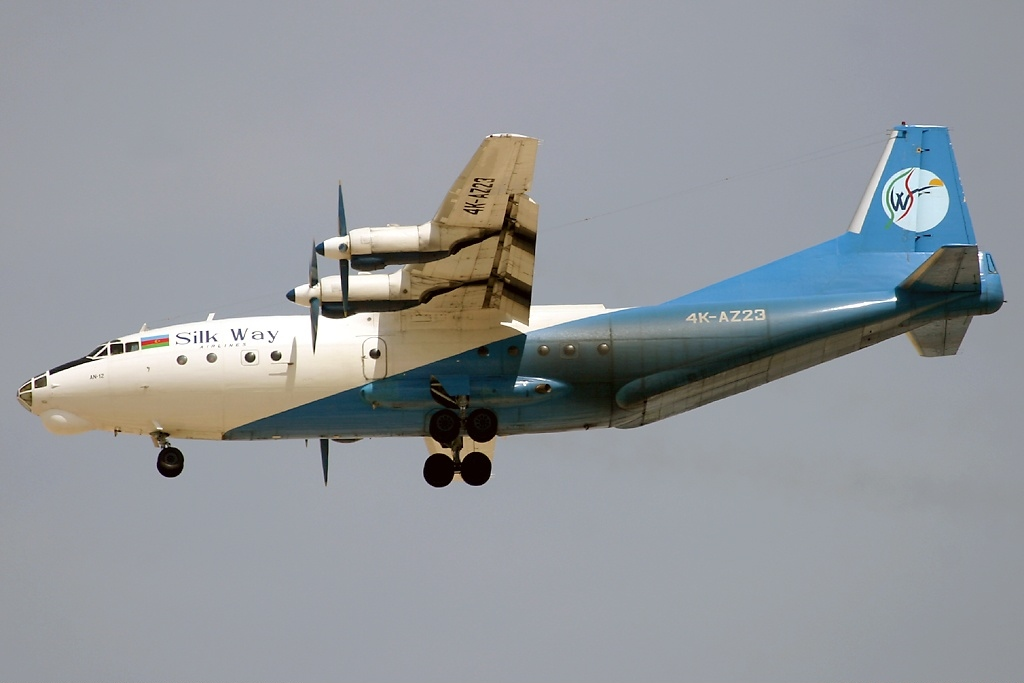
Silk Way Antonov An-12 in 2005

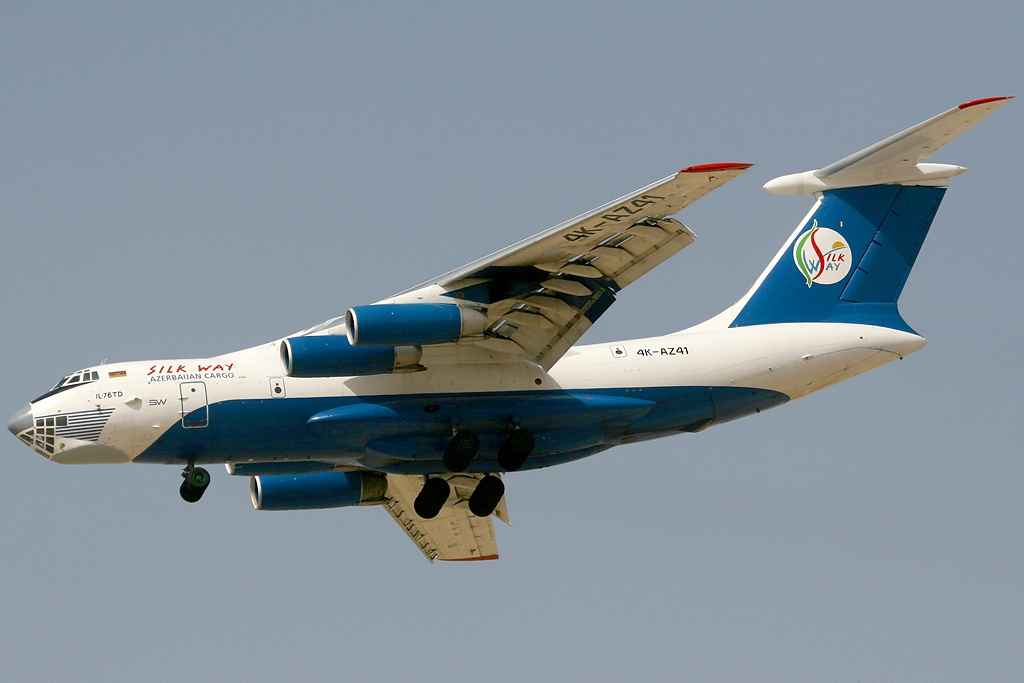
Silk Way Ilyushin Il-76 in 2010

The company was founded in 2001 and started commercial flights on 6 October 2001. In early 2015, Silk Way West Airlines negotiated a contract for another three Boeing 747-8 freighters, the 747-8F. In May 2015, the airline was announced as the launch customer for the Antonov An-178 after placing an order for 10 aircraft. In 2017, the company signed purchase of 10 more Boeing 737 MAX aircraft with a total cost of $1B.

However, the Boeing 737 MAX passenger airliner was grounded worldwide between March 2019 and December 2020 – longer in many jurisdictions – after 346 people died in two crashes, Lion Air Flight 610 on 29 October 2018, and Ethiopian Airlines Flight 302 on 10 March 2019. The United States Federal Aviation Administration (FAA) resisted grounding the aircraft until 13 March 2019, when it received evidence of accident similarities. By then, 51 other regulators had already grounded the plane, and by 18 March 2019, all 387 aircraft in service were grounded. Therefore, these aircraft are not included in Silk Way Airlines' current fleet.

=== Cargo and munitions, humanitarian aid transportation ===
In July 2017, an investigation by the leading Bulgarian daily newspaper Trud, which has a reputation for investigative crime reporting, reported that Silk Way Airlines exploited a loophole in the international aviation and transport regulations to offer flights to arms manufacturers and private companies – with much of the cargo heading for conflict zones including Central Asia and Africa. However, the transportation of military cargo by civil aircraft is heavily regulated by the International Civil Aviation Organization (ICAO). Therefore, Silk Way Airlines applied for diplomatic exemption of the aircraft and cargo (e.g. diplomatic charter flights), through local agencies to transport heavy weapons, ammunition, and white phosphorus munitions, in support of the United States military operations, to several challenging war zones.

The published documents included correspondence between the Bulgarian Ministry of Foreign Affairs and the Embassy of Azerbaijan to Bulgaria with attached documents for weapons deals and diplomatic clearance for overflight and/or landing in Bulgaria and many other countries such as the United States, Saudi Arabia, United Arab Emirates, Turkey. The documents disclosed that American weapons manufacturers had shipped over $1 billion of weapons through Silk Way Airlines, and corporate subcontractors included Purple Shovel LLC based in Sterling, Virginia, the United States Department of Defense subcontracting vehicle Culmen International LLC based in Alexandria, and weapons and defense procurement firm Chemring Military Products based in Perry, Florida. When Silk Way Airlines did not have enough available planes, Azerbaijan's Air Force jets would transport the military shipments. In the investigation, the reporter accused responsible authorities of many countries (e.g. Bulgaria, the Czech Republic, Hungary, Israel, Poland, Romania, Serbia, Slovakia, Turkey, as well as to the militaries of Saudi Arabia, United Arab Emirates, the military forces of Germany and Denmark in Afghanistan, of Sweden in Iraq, and the United States Special Operations Command (USSOCOM)) of allegedly "turning a blind eye and allowed diplomatic flights for the transport of tons of weapons, carried out by civil aircrafts [sic]; for military needs."

The Azerbaijan Ministry of Foreign Affairs called information of Bulgarian media on transportation of weapons by "Silk Way" under the cover of diplomatic immunity misleading. The Azerbaijani Embassy in Bulgaria also denied these assumptions as unreasonable.

In 2018, Silk Way Airlines responded to the Trud journalist's allegations formally, stating that the company had legally conducted the flights on behalf of the United States government and followed established protocols and regulations of ICAO, as well as operating in compliance with DOD requirements.

The journalist responsible for the allegations, Dilyana Gaytandzhieva, was fired from the publication. Trud has however yet to add any clarifications to or retract the article in question. Silk Way Airlines subsidiary Silk Way West Airlines supports German NGO 'Wings of Help' by flying aid supplies into northern Iraq, aiding over 23,000 children.

In 2020, it was alleged again that Silk Way Airlines were transporting Israeli-made weapons from Ovda Airport in Eilat, Israel to Azerbaijan, on behalf of Azerbaijani Armed Forces during the 2020 Nagorno-Karabakh war. It was speculated that Israel sold advanced weaponry to Azerbaijan on operations against Armenian forces, and Silk Way Airlines were contracted to transport the orders.

== Destinations ==
In September 2018, Silk Way Airlines announced its expansion of routes to Northern China, with flights to Tianjin carried out twice a week.

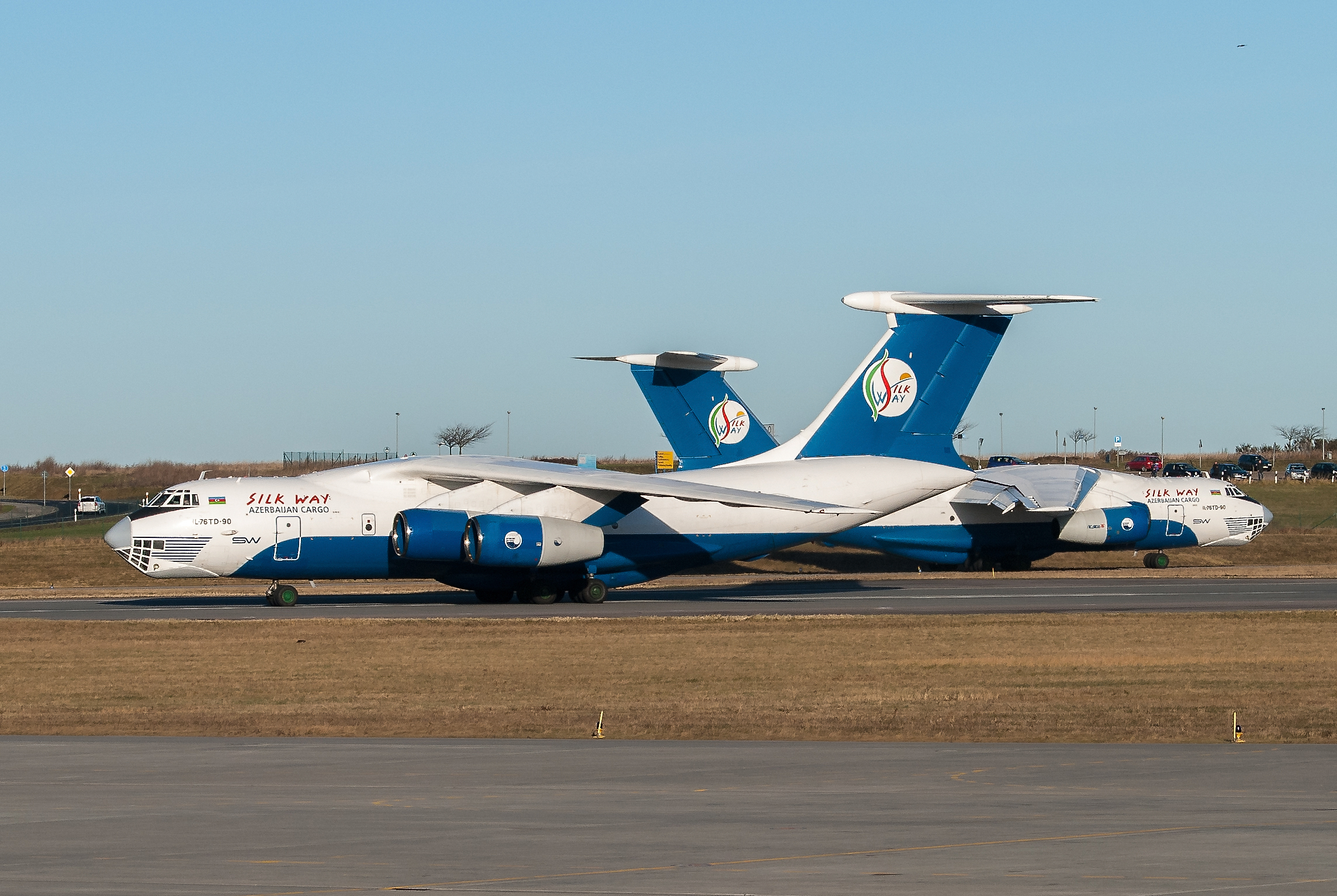
Two Silk Way Il-76TD-90, still flying with old logo, at Neubrandenburg Airport in 2012.

== Fleet ==
As of August 2025, Silk Way Airlines operates the following aircraft:

- 5 Ilyushin Il-76

The additional fleet of Boeing and Airbus cargo aircraft is operated by sister company Silk Way West Airlines.

== Incidents and accidents ==
- On 7 November 2002, at 11:30 local time, Silk Way Airlines Flight 4132, which was operated using an Antonov An-12 (registration 4K-AZ21) overshot the runway upon landing at N'Djamena International Airport in Chad. The aircraft was destroyed, but the six crew members on board survived.
- On 6 July 2011, at 00:10 local time, Silk Way Airlines Flight 995, an Ilyushin Il-76 (registration 4K-AZ55), crashed into a mountain 25 km (16 mi) short of Bagram Airfield in Afghanistan, killing all of the crew of nine people on board the cargo flight from Baku, which was operating on behalf of NATO.
- On 18 May 2016, a Silk Way Airlines Antonov An-12 crashed during takeoff at Dwyer Airport in southern Afghanistan, killing seven of the nine crew members on board the cargo flight to Mary International Airport.
