= Mirali Seyidov =

Azerbaijani literary scholar (b. 1918, d. 1992)

Mirali Seyidov Mirəli Seyidov
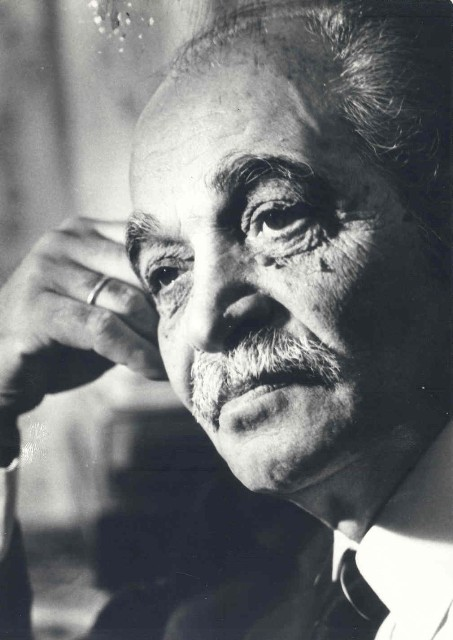
- Born: May 5, 1918; Erivan, Erivan uezd, Transcaucasian Democratic Federative Republic
- Died: April 26, 1992 (aged 73); Baku, Azerbaijan
- Education: Erivan Azerbaijani Pedagogical College
- Occupations: literary critic, turkologist, mythologist
- Awards: Honored Scientist of the Azerbaijan SSR

Mirali Miralakbar oghlu Seyidov (Azerbaijani: Mirəli Mirələkbər oğlu Seyidov, May 5, 1918 — April 26, 1992) was an Azerbaijani mythologist, turkologist, literary scholar, member of the Union of Azerbaijani Writers (1976), doctor of philological sciences (1968), professor (1979), and corresponding member of the Azerbaijan National Academy of Creativity.

== Early life ==
Mirali Seyidov was born on May 5, 1918, in Erivan. He studied at the Azerbaijan department of Armenian State Pedagogical University (1938–1944). At the same time, he studied at the Oriental Department of the Yerevan State University (1941–1945). During those years, he worked as a corrector, literary worker, head of the youth department, deputy secretary, press commissioner in the editorial office of the Sovet Ermenistani.

== Career ==
He worked as the Head of the Department of Medieval Azerbaijani Literature of the Nizami Museum of Azerbaijani Literature of ANAS (1945–1953), Senior Researcher at the Medieval Department at the Nizami Institute of Language and Literature (1953–1960), Senior Researcher at the Department of Literary Relations (1960–1967), Head of the Department (1967–1980), Head of the department of Azerbaijani mythology and medieval folklore (1980–1988), leading researcher in the folk creativity department of the institute (since 1987).

Seyidov started his literary activity in 1941 with reviews and essays published in the Soviet Armenia newspaper. He later appeared in the press from time to time. In 1952, he defended his doctoral thesis Life and works of Sayat-Nova, and in 1967, he defended his doctoral dissertation Azerbaijani-Armenian Literary Relations (From ancient times to the end of the 18th century). He worked on research on Azerbaijani Mythology As a Source For Studying the Origin of the Azerbaijani People. He participated in The All-Union Turkological meetings and conferences of the USSR.

== DeathA ==
He died in Baku on April 26, 1992, and was buried in II Alley of Honor.

== Recognition ==
- Honored Scientist of the Azerbaijan SSR (1982)
