= Dwyer Airport =

Military airport in Afghanistan

- IATA: DWR; ICAO: OADY

Summary
- Airport type: Military
- Serves: Camp Dwyer
- Location: Lashkargah, Afghanistan
- Elevation AMSL: 2,418 ft / 737 m
- Coordinates: 31°05′31″N 064°04′01″E

Map
- Location of Dwyer Airport in Afghanistan

Runways
Direction	Length		Surface
Direction	m	ft	Surface
05/23	2,439	8,003	Concrete
- Source: Landings.com

Dwyer Airport (IATA: DWR, ICAO: OADY) is a former military airport of Marine Expeditionary Brigade, located southwest of Lashkargah in Helmand Province in southern Afghanistan.

== See also ==
- List of airports in Afghanistan
