= Cranfield Vertigo =

1980s British human-powered helicopter

General information
- Type: Human-powered helicopter
- National origin: United Kingdom
- Manufacturer: Andrew Cranfield
- Number built: 1

The Vertigo was a human-powered helicopter designed and built in the 1980s by Andrew Cranfield, an engineer with Westland Helicopters.

== Development ==
In 1980, Cranfield was a graduate apprentice with Westland Helicopters, when he was prompted by the American Helicopter Society offering the Sikorsky Prize for human-powered helicopters, to develop a design for that competition.

The design Cranfield developed was a coaxial helicopter comprising two identical two-bladed rotors, each having a diameter of 79 ft (24 m) and blades with a constant 5 ft (1.5 m) chord. The lower rotor was set at 6° dihedral, and the higher rotor at 9° dihedral. In order to take advantage offered by ground effect, the rotors were set as low to the ground, and as closely together, as could be practically achieved, with the fuselage and pilot being located above the rotor assembly. The rotors were constructed of carbon fibre, styrofoam and Mylar. The blades were fixed, with the pitch and coning built into their design. Flight control was intended to be achieved by weight shift, with the pilot moving about to enable this. Power was transmitted by to the rotors by a set of bicycle pedals powering a set of bevel and pinion gears.

In 1987, in an article published in the journal Chartered Mechanical Engineer, Cranfield described a series of trials with the Vertigo, the last of which the pilot was able to achieve the 6 rpm necessary for the craft to fly. It was reported that "the blades started to show signs of generating significant lift; this was confirmed as the aircraft began to skip around the floor." Cranfield reported issues with the transmission, and with rotor performance being affected by their being closely coupled together as needing further attention.

In 1989, the remains of the Vertigo were donated to The Helicopter Museum, in Weston-super-Mare, England, where they are currently on display.

== Specifications ==
Data from The Helicopter Museum and Chartered Mechanical Engineer

General characteristics

- Crew: 1 (pilot)
- Empty weight: 93.5 lb (42 kg)
- Powerplant: 1 × human cyclist
- Main rotor diameter: 2 × 79 ft (24 m)
- Main rotor area: 750 sq ft (70 m^{2})

Performance

== See also ==
Aircraft of comparable role, configuration, and era

- University of Maryland Gamera I
- University of Maryland Gamera II
- California Polytechnic State University Da Vinci III
- AeroVelo Atlas

Related lists

- List of Human-powered aircraft
