= 2013 in aviation =

This is a list of aviation-related events in 2013.

== Events ==
=== January ===
4 January

- A Britten-Norman BN-2 Islander carrying the head of the Missoni fashion house, Vittorio Missoni, and five other people on a domestic flight from Los Roques to Simón Bolívar International Airport outside Caracas, Venezuela, disappears over the Caribbean Sea 10 miles (16 km) south of Los Roques.

16 January

- During a domestic flight from Yamaguchi, Japan, to Haneda Airport in Tokyo, All Nippon Airways Flight 692, a Boeing 787 Dreamliner, makes an emergency landing at Takamatsu Airport in Takamatsu after cockpit warning lights indicate a battery failure and the presence of smoke; one passenger is injured during the evacuation of the plane. Because of this incident and several others in recent days involving fuel leaks, a battery fire, a wiring problem, a glitch in the computer controlling the brakes, and a cracked cockpit window in various Boeing 787s around the world, All Nippon Airways and Japan Airlines both ground their Dreamliner fleets. Later in the day, the U.S. Federal Aviation Administration grounds all Boeing 787s in the United States.

17 January

- The European Aviation Safety Agency endorses the Federal Aviation Administration's grounding of Boeing 787 Dreamliners. By the end of the day, Dreamliners have been grounded worldwide pending investigation of the possibility of a fire hazard posed by their lithium-ion batteries.

28 January

- Italy's highest criminal court rules that "ample and congruent" evidence exists to make it "abundantly" clear that a missile shot down Itavia Flight 870 over the Mediterranean Sea in June 1980 and orders the Government of Italy to pay damages to the families of the victims.

29 January

- SCAT Airlines Flight 760, a Bombardier CRJ200, crashes in thick fog near Kyzyltu, Kazakhstan, 5 kilometres (3.1 miles; 2.7 nautical miles) short of the runway at Almaty, killing all 21 people on board.

31 January

- The bankrupt Indonesian airline Batavia Air ceases operations and goes into liquidation.

=== February ===
- India's Kingfisher Airlines ceases all corporate operations due to financial difficulties. It had suspended flight operations in October 2012.

1 February

- Malaysia Airlines joins the Oneworld airline alliance.

13 February

- South Airlines Flight 8971, an Antonov An-24 with 52 people on board, overshoots the runway and crash-lands while attempting to make an emergency landing in fog at Donetsk International Airport in Donetsk, Ukraine, killing five people.

14 February

- American Airlines and US Airways announce an $11,000,000,000 deal to merge, creating the world's largest airline, with 900 planes, 3,200 daily flights, and 95,000 employees. Under the deal, former US Airways management will dominate the merged airline, but the "US Airways" brand will disappear.

16 February

- Iraqi Airways begins flights to Kuwait for the first time since Iraq invaded Kuwait in August 1990.

18 February

- After cutting a hole in a perimeter fence at Brussels Airport outside Brussels, Belgium, eight armed and masked men dressed as police officers drive in two vehicles displaying flashing blue lights onto the tarmac and confront guards loading a cargo of diamonds onto Helvetic Airways Flight LX789, a Fokker 100 passenger jet packed with passengers and preparing for departure for a flight to Zurich, Switzerland. They steal 120 small packages containing a combined $50,000,000 (£32,000,000) worth of diamonds in a three-minute robbery and escape via the same hole in the fence without firing a shot.

26 February

- A fire starts aboard the Ultramagic N-425 hot-air balloon SU-283 while it is attempting to land near Luxor, Egypt, carrying 19 tourists, a tour guide, and its pilot. The pilot and one tourist leap from the balloon and suffer serious injuries before the balloon, with the other 19 people still aboard, rises rapidly to an altitude of about 300 metres (980 feet), experiences an explosion heard several kilometers away, collapses, crashes to the ground, and suffers another explosion. The 19 people still aboard, seven of whom jump to their deaths to escape the fire, are killed. It is the deadliest hot-air balloon accident in history, exceeding the death toll in a 1989 accident in Australia.

=== March ===
- Lion Air and Airbus sign the most valuable commercial order in history, a $23,800,000,000 Lion Air order for 234 Airbus A320 airliners. It exceeds the previous most valuable order, a $22,400,000,000 order by Lion Air for 230 airliners from Boeing in 2011.
- Evergreen International Aviation sells its subsidiary Evergreen Helicopters to Erickson Air-Crane.

4 March

- Two minutes from touchdown at Goma International Airport, the Compagnie Africaine d'Aviation Fokker 50 9Q-CBD crashes in bad weather in an empty lot in Goma, Democratic Republic of the Congo, killing six of the people on board and injuring all three survivors.

22 March

- The Malaysian low-cost airline Malindo Air makes its first flights.

25 March

- Boeing makes the first of two Boeing 787 Dreamliner test flights to show that modifications to the 787's lithium-ion battery system have solved the problem of battery overheating experienced by Dreamliners earlier in the year. The aircraft, bearing the livery of LOT Polish Airlines, departs from Paine Field in Everett, Washington, flies south down the coast of Washington and halfway down the coast of Oregon, and makes a low-altitude, low-speed circle over the Strait of Juan de Fuca before returning without incident.

28 March

- Two United States Air Force B-2 Spirit bombers make the first nonstop B-2 flight to and from the Korean Peninsula, departing Whiteman Air Force Base, Missouri, bombing a target range on a South Korean island, and returning in a 37 1/2-hour flight. The flight, part of the annual Foal Eagle field training exercise, is intended to signal American support to South Korea in the face of belligerent North Korean rhetoric.
- The low-cost Indian-Malaysian airline AirAsia India is founded. It will begin flight operations in June 2014.

31 March

- Austrian Airlines retires the "Lauda Air" brand. Austrian Airlines and Lauda Air had merged in July 2012.
- A United States Marine Corps pilot makes the first vertical landing in a production Lockheed Martin F-35B Lightning II.

=== April ===
- Bankrupt Aerosvit Airlines ceases operations. Some of its fleet is transferred to Ukraine International Airlines.
- Meridiana Fly completes its merger with Air Italy and is renamed Meridiana.

5 April

- Boeing makes the second of two Boeing 787 Dreamliner test flights to show that modifications to the 787's lithium-ion battery system have solved the problem of battery overheating experienced by Dreamliners earlier in the year. The aircraft, bearing the livery of LOT Polish Airlines, makes a 755-mile (1,216-kilometer) flight along the West Coast of the United States in just under two hours without incident. The completion of two successful test flights is a major step toward ending the worldwide grounding of 787s.

7 April

- A Helicópteros del Pacífico (Helipac) Mil Mi-8P registration OB-1916-P crashes en route from Iquitos to a Perenco site near the Curaray River, in the Loreto Region of Peru. All 13 people on board died.

13 April

- Lion Air Flight 904, a Boeing 737-8GP carrying 108 people, ditches in shallow water off Bali 0.6 nautical miles (1.1 kilometres) from the runway while attempting to land at Ngurah Rai International Airport in Denpasar, Indonesia. All on board survive, although 22 people are injured.

27 April

- The Boeing 787 Dreamliner makes its first passenger-carrying flight since the worldwide grounding of Dreamliners in January 2013, when a packed Ethiopian Airlines 787 flies from Addis Ababa, Ethiopia, to Nairobi, Kenya. Boeing vice president Randy Tinseth is among the passengers.

29 April

- National Airlines Flight 102, a Boeing 747-428BCF cargo aircraft, crashes just after takeoff from Bagram Airfield in Bagram, Afghanistan, after its crew reported that its cargo of five heavy military vehicles had shifted and caused the aircraft to stall. Its entire crew of seven dies in the crash.
- Virgin Galactic's commercial spacecraft SpaceShipTwo makes its first powered flight. Released by its jet-powered mothership White Knight Two after a 45-minute climb at an altitude of 48,000 feet (15,000 meters) over the Mojave Desert, SpaceShipTwo burns its engine for 16 seconds, climbing to 55,000 feet (17,000 meters) and reaching a speed of Mach 1.2 before gliding to a landing at Mojave Air and Space Port in Mojave, California, after 10 minutes of independent flight. Mark Stuckey is the pilot and Mike Alsbury the co-pilot for the flight.

=== May ===
1 May

- A Boeing X-51A WaveRider unmanned scramjet demonstration aircraft detaches from a Boeing B-52H Stratofortress and reaches Mach 4.8 (3,200 mph or 5,100 km/h) powered by a booster rocket. It then separates cleanly from the booster, ignites its own engine, accelerates to Mach 5.1 (3,400 mph or 5,500 km/h), and flies for 240 seconds – setting the record for the longest air-breathing hypersonic flight in history – before running out of fuel and plunging into the Pacific Ocean off Point Mugu, California, after transmitting 370 seconds of telemetry. The flight – the fourth and last planned X-51A test flight and the first successful one – completes the X-51 program.

3 May

- Batik Air, a full-service airline owned by Lion Air, makes its first flight.

4 May

- The first Solar Impulse aircraft, HB-SIA, the world's first solar powered aircraft capable of operating day and night, completes the first leg of its attempt to become the solar-powered aircraft to fly across the continental United States, landing at Phoenix Sky Harbor International Airport in Phoenix, Arizona, at 12:30 a.m. PDT after departing Moffett Field in Mountain View, California, at dawn on 3 May and covering 1,203 kilometres (748 miles) in 18 hours 18 minutes at an average speed-over-ground of 65.5 km/h (40.7 mph). Plans call for the aircraft, which requires no fuel because it uses photovoltaic cells in its wings to supply it with power and charge its batteries for use at night, to make a series of five flights of 19 to 25 hours each, flying at about 40 mph (64 km/h), with a stopover of approximately 10 days in each city it visits, culminating in an arrival at John F. Kennedy International Airport in New York, New York.

16 May

- Nepal Airlines Flight 555, the de Havilland Canada DHC-6 Twin Otter 9N-ABO, skids off the runway at Jomsom Airport in Jomsom, Nepal, and falls 20 metres (66 feet) into the Gandaki River. All 21 people on board survive, but seven suffer serious injuries.

20 May

- Passenger-carrying flights of the Boeing 787 Dreamliner resume in the United States as United Airlines Flight 1 flies from Houston, Texas, to Chicago, Illinois. United, which plans to resume international 787 service on 10 June, becomes the fourth airline to resume Dreamliner flights, after Ethiopian Airlines, Qatar Airways, and Air India.

27 May

- TACA Airlines leaves the Star Alliance.

=== June ===
- AirAsia exits its investment in the first incarnation of AirAsia Japan, leaving AirAsia Japan as a wholly owned subsidiary of All Nippon Airways.

11 June

- Air traffic controllers in France begin a strike to protest European Union plans to reorganize and privatize air traffic control over Europe.

12 June

- In response to a call for industrial action by the European Transport Workers' Federation, air traffic controllers in 11 other countries engage in lower-key industrial actions in sympathy with the French strike, although flights are not disrupted in other countries.

13 June

- The Canadian AeroVelo Atlas human-powered helicopter makes a 64-second flight that reaches an altitude of 3.3 metres (11 feet), winning the American Helicopter Society International's Igor I. Sikorsky Human Powered Helicopter Competition by becoming the first such helicopter to fly for at least 60 seconds and achieve an altitude of at least 3 metres (9.8 feet).
- The French air traffic controller strike ends, having forced the cancellation of over 2,000 flights, without resolution of the issues which prompted it. Industrial actions in other countries related to the French strike are also ended.

15 June

- Google reveals its previously secret Project Loon with the first public launch of a maneuverable unmanned balloon designed to operate in the stratosphere at an altitude of about 12 miles (19 km) and bring broadband wireless Internet access to remote regions and areas affected by natural disasters. Google has launched 30 such balloons during the week from a field near Lake Tekapo on New Zealand's South Island to test the system over the cities of Christchurch and Canterbury.

18 June

- EVA Air joins the Star Alliance.

30 June

- Air Lituanica begins flight operations, using a single leased Embraer E-170 to provide service between Vilnius, Lithuania, and Brussels, Belgium.

=== July ===
2 July

- When its pilot loses control in high winds, a Polar Airlines Mil Mi-8 helicopter crashes at Yakutsk, Russia, killing 24 of the 28 people on board and injuring all four survivors.

6 July

- Attempting to land at San Francisco International Airport in San Francisco, California, after a flight from Incheon International Airport in Seoul, South Korea, Asiana Airlines Flight 214, the Boeing 777-28E(ER) HL7742, comes down short of the runway, strikes a seawall, and crashes, killing two – one of whom is struck by a responding fire truck – of the 307 people on board and injuring 182 of the 304 survivors; one of survivors later also dies. It is the second crash and first fatal crash of a Boeing 777 and the first fatal airline crash in the United States since February 2009.

7 July

- A Rediske Air de Havilland Canada DHC-3 Otter air taxi crashes onto the runway immediately after takeoff from Soldotna Airport in Soldotna, Alaska, and bursts into flames, killing all 10 people on board.

=== August ===
1 August

- The Government of Serbia and Etihad Airways formalize an agreement under which Jat Airways will be reorganized and rebranded as Air Serbia, with Serbia owning 51% of the airline and Etihad owning 49%. Etihad Airways is granted management rights over Air Serbia for an initial five-year period. The name change to Air Serbia will take place in October.

13 August

- The United States Department of Justice files suit to block the proposed merger of American Airlines and US Airways, saying it would harm consumers and lead to substantially less competition, higher airfares and fees, and less service to many airports.

14 August

- UPS Airlines Flight 1354, a Airbus A300F4-622R cargo aircraft N155UP arriving from Louisville, Kentucky, with a crew of two aboard, crashes one-half-mile (0.8 m) from the runway at Birmingham–Shuttlesworth International Airport outside of Birmingham, Alabama. Both crew members die.

=== September ===
- South Supreme Airlines begins operations.

12 September

- In a ceremony at Boeing's assembly plant in Long Beach, California, the United States Air Force takes delivery of the last of the 223 C-17 Globemaster IIIs produced for it. After the ceremony, the final U.S. Air Force C-17 takes off from the Long Beach plant bound for Joint Base Charleston, South Carolina, recreating the flight of the first C-17, which flew from Long Beach to Charleston Air Force Base when it was delivered to the U.S. Air Force in July 1993. Boeing continues to manufacture the C-17, but only for foreign customers.

18 September

- Zest Airways rebrands itself as AirAsia Zest.

22 September

- To commemorate the 100th anniversary of the first flight across the Mediterranean Sea, pilot Baptiste Solis flies a near-replica Morane-Saulnier G nonstop along the same route from France to Tunisia. Roland Garros made the original nonstop flight on 23 September 1913 in a Morane-Saulnier H, a single-seat version of the Morane-Saulnier G.

=== October ===
1 October

- LAN Colombia joins the Oneworld airline alliance.

3 October

- Associated Aviation Flight 361, an Embraer EMB 120 Brasilia on a domestic charter flight in Nigeria carrying the body of Olusegun Agagu, the former governor of Ondo State, from Murtala Mohammed Airport in Lagos to Akure Airport in Ondo State, crashes shortly after takeoff, killing 15 of the 20 people on board.

7 October

- Japan Airlines announces that it will purchase 31 A350 airliners from Airbus for $9,500,000,000 to replace its fleet of Boeing 777s. The announcement ends Boeing's decades-long dominance of the Japanese market; before the Japan Airlines deal with Airbus, Boeing and Airbus had competed head-to-head in almost every market worldwide except for Japan.

16 October

- Lao Airlines Flight 301, an ATR 72 on a scheduled domestic passenger flight in Laos from Vientiane to Pakse, crashes into the Mekong River while on approach to Pakse, killing all 49 people on board.

26 October

- The first incarnation of AirAsia Japan ceases operations following the June departure of AirAsia from its investment in the airline, which had left it as a wholly owned subsidiary of All Nippon Airways.
- Jat Airways begins operations under its new name, Air Serbia, with a flight from Belgrade, Serbia, to Abu Dhabi in the United Arab Emirates.
- The first free-flight test of the Sierra Nevada Corporation's Dream Chaser lifting-body spaceplane takes place at Edwards Air Force Base in California. After dropping from an Erickson Air-Crane Skycrane helicopter at an altitude of 12,500 feet (3,800 m), the unmanned Dream Chaser flies autonomously in a steep dive, pulls up perfectly, and glides to the center line of the runway, but its left landing gear fails to deploy, causing it to roll on its side and skid off the runway in a crash-landing.

30 October

- Qatar Airways joins the Oneworld airline alliance.

=== November ===
1 November

- Vanilla Air, a rebranding of the first incarnation of AirAsia Japan, is founded as a wholly owned subsidiary of All Nippon Airways. It will begin flight operations in December.

2 November

- Tracey Curtis-Taylor takes off from Cape Town International Airport in Cape Town, South Africa, in the Boeing-Stearman Model 75 Spirit of Artemis to recreate the flight of Mary, Lady Heath, who in 1928 became the first person to fly a small, open-cockpit plane from South Africa to London, taking three months to complete the journey in an Avro Avian. Curtis-Taylor will complete her flight on 31 December.

12 November

- The United States Department of Justice drops its lawsuit to block the merger of American Airlines and US Airways in exchange for the new airline giving up gates at Ronald Reagan Washington National Airport in Arlington, Virginia, Boston Logan International Airport, Chicago O'Hare International Airport, Dallas Love Field, Los Angeles International Airport, Miami International Airport, and LaGuardia Airport in New York City. The agreement clears the way for the merger, which will create the world's largest airline, to be named American Airlines but to be run by US Airways management.

17 November

- Seconds after the crew of Tatarstan Airlines Flight 363, the Boeing 737-53A VQ-BBN, initiates a go-around due to an unstable approach while attempting to land at Kazan International Airport in Kazan, Russia, the aircraft noses down, crashes almost vertically, and disintegrates in an explosion, killing all 50 people on board. It the greatest loss of life in a single aviation accident in 2013.

29 November

- LAM Mozambique Airlines Flight 470, an Embraer 190 flying over Botswana, suddenly begins a steep descent from 38,000 feet (12,000 meters), crosses into Namibia, and crashes in Namibia's Bwabwata National Park, killing all 33 people aboard. It is LAM Mozambique Airlines's first fatal accident since 1970, and Mozambique's deadliest air accident since a crash that killed the country's president, Samora Machel, in October 1986.
- The Police Scotland Eurocopter EC135 T2+ helicopter G-SPAO crashes onto the roof of The Clutha, a crowded pub in the city centre of Glasgow, Scotland, at 10:30 p.m., killing all three people on board and six people on the ground.

30 November

- Evergreen International Aviation ceases operations.

=== December ===
2 December

- Evergreen International Airlines flies its last flight.

11 December

- NAM Air, regional airline subsidiary of Sriwijaya Air in Indonesia takes its first flight from Jakarta to Pangkal Pinang.

20 December

- Vanilla Air begins flight operations, flying from Tokyo's Narita International Airport to Okinawa and Taipei.

26 December

- Textron, the parent company of Cessna Aircraft, announces that it has reached an agreement to purchase Beechcraft Corporation for $1,400,000,000.

30 December

- For the first time in more than 50 years, a commercial flight takes place between Key West, Florida, and Cuba, when a Cessna 441 Conquest II with nine paying passengers aboard flies from Key West International Airport to Havana. Key West had received approval to conduct flights to and from Cuba in October 2011, but it had taken over two years for charter airline operators to receive all the necessary permissions to make the first flight. Key West International Airport director Peter Horton describes the flight as "test run", and regular Key West-Cuba commercial air service remains a distant prospect.

31 December

- Tracey Curtis-Taylor arrives at Goodwood, West Sussex, England, at the end of a 9,825-mile (15,821-kilometer), 59-day flight from Cape Town International Airport in Cape Town, South Africa, in the Boeing-Stearman Model 75 Spirit of Artemis. During the flight – which recreates the first South Africa-to-London flight in a small, open-cockpit plane in history, made over the course of three months in 1928 by Mary, Lady Heath, in an Avro Avian – Curtis-Taylor has made 38 stops, flying over Zimbabwe, Zambia, Tanzania, Kenya, Uganda, Sudan, and Egypt before crossing Europe and arriving in England only 13 days behind schedule despite various challenges and setbacks along the way.
- Evergreen International Aviation files for its own dissolution under U.S. Chapter 7 bankruptcy law. The filing is on behalf of itself and its subsidiaries Evergreen Aviation Ground Logistics Enterprise, Evergreen Defense and Security Services, Evergreen International Airlines, Evergreen Systems Logistics, Evergreen Trade, and Supertanker Services.

== First flights ==
=== June ===
- 14 June – Airbus A350 XWB (registration F-WXWB) at Toulouse–Blagnac Airport, Toulouse, France

=== September ===
- 16 September – Bombardier CS100 (C-FBCS) at Montréal-Mirabel International Airport, Montreal, Quebec.
- 17 September – Boeing 787-9 (N789ZB) at Paine Field in Everett, Washington, United States.
- 26 September – Gee Bee Super Q.E.D. II

=== October ===
- 24 October – e-Go (G-OFUN) at Tibenham airfield, Norfolk, England.

=== November ===
- 14 November – Piaggio-Selex P.1HH HammerHead (XAV-SA-001) at Trapani Airport, Italy.

=== December ===
- 28 December – Embraer Legacy 450 PT-ZIJ at Sao Jose dos Campos, Brazil.

== Entered service ==
- 1 August – Airbus A400M Atlas with the French Air Force

== Retirements ==
=== September ===
- 20 September – Vickers VC10 by the Royal Air Force

== Deadliest crash ==
The deadliest crash of this year was Tatarstan Airlines Flight 363, Boeing 737 which crashed during landing in Kazan, Russia on 17 November, killing all 50 people on board.
