= 2011 in aviation =

This is a list of aviation-related events in 2011.

== Events ==
=== January ===
1 January

- Kolavia Flight 348, operated by Tupolev Tu-154B-2 RA-85588 of Kogalymavia catches fire while taxiing for take-off at Surgut International Airport, Russia, killing three people, and injuring 43. The aircraft is destroyed by the fire.

9 January

- Iran Air Flight 277, crashes while performing a go-around at Urmia Airport killing 77 of the 106 people aboard, and injuring 26 people. A total of 28 people survived. The aircraft involved in the accident was a Boeing 727-286Adv.

21 January

- British Airways and Iberia merge to form International Airlines Group (IAG), the world's third-largest airline in terms of annual revenue and the second-largest airline group in Europe. However, both airlines continue to operate under their previous brands.

25 January

- Senegal Airlines begins flight operations.

=== February ===
10 February

- Manx2 Flight 7100 from Belfast, operated by Fairchild Swearingen Metroliner EC-ITP leased from Flightline BCN of Barcelona, overturns on its third attempt to land at Cork, Ireland in fog, killing six and injuring six.

27 February

- Indian Airlines merges into Air India.

=== March ===
5 March

- An Antonov An-148 crashes at Garbuzovo, Alxeevsky Region, Belgorod Oblast, Russia following an in-flight break-up. All six people on board are killed.
- Opposition forces shoot down a Libyan Air Force jet fighter over Ra's Lanuf after it attempts to bomb the town, killing its two pilots.

9 March

- The Space Shuttle Discovery, first of the space shuttles to be retired, glides to a landing to end its 39th and final mission – the most by any space shuttle.

11 March

- Following the 2011 Tōhoku earthquake off the coast of Japan, Sendai Airport in Natori, Japan, is engulfed by a tsunami and put out of action. Flights are suspended from a number of airports in Japan, including Narita International Airport and Haneda Airport, Tokyo. In Hawaii, Hilo International, Honolulu International, Kahului and Lihue airports are all temporarily closed.

=== April ===
1 April

- Southwest Airlines Flight 812, the Boeing 737-3HR N632SW with 123 people on board, suffers an in-flight structural failure which opens a six-foot (1.8-meter)-long hole in its fuselage and triggers an explosive decompression and the deployment of oxygen masks. Only two people suffer minor injuries, and the airliner makes a successful emergency descent and landing at Yuma International Airport in Yuma, Arizona. Southwest Airlines grounds all 80 of its 737-300s for inspection.

4 April

- A Georgian Airways Canadair CL-600-2B19 Regional Jet CRJ-100ER (registration 4L-GAE) on behalf of the United Nations crashes in the Democratic Republic of the Congo after a flight from Goma International Airport to N'Djili Airport in Kinshasa, killing 32 of the 33 people on board.

21 April

- The Sukhoi Superjet 100, the first airliner developed from start to finish in post-Soviet Russia, makes its first commercial passenger flight, flying for the Armenian airline Armavia from Yerevan, Armenia, to Moscow, Russia.

=== May ===
2 May

- A remotely operated vehicle finally finds the flight recorders from Air France Flight 447 on the bottom of the Atlantic Ocean and brings them to surface after a 23-month search for them. Flight 447 had crashed on 1 June 2009.

7 May

- Merpati Nusantara Airlines Flight 8968, a Xian MA60 with 25 people, crashes off the coast of West Papua, Indonesia while on approach to Kaimana Airport, killing everyone on board.

11 May

- Judy Wexler becomes the first woman to pilot a human-powered helicopter, remaining airborne for four seconds and achieving an altitude of a few inches in the University of Maryland's Gamera I.

13 May

- The first Solar Impulse aircraft, HB-SIA, the first solar-powered aircraft capable of both day and night flight thanks to its batteries charged by solar power, makes its first international flight, flying 630 km (390 mi) from Payerne Airport outside Payerne, Switzerland, to Brussels Airport in Belgium, in 12 hours 59 minutes at an average speed of 50 km/h (31 mph).

18 May

- Omega Aerial Refueling Services Flight 70, a Boeing 707, veers off the runway in California following an engine separation. The aircraft is consumed by fire. Everyone survives.

=== June ===
16 June

- The Russian Federation's flag carrier Aeroflot puts its first Sukhoi Superjet 100 into service.

20 June

- On final approach to Petrozavodsk Airport near Petrozavodsk, Russia, after a flight from Moscow's Domodedovo International Airport, RusAir Flight 243, the Tupolev Tu-134A-3 RA-65691, lands short of the runway due to poor visibility and weather, killing 47 passengers and crew members and leaving all five survivors injured. The aircraft is written off.

29 June

- KLM becomes the first airline in the world to provide flights using biofuel.

=== July ===
6 July

- A Silk Way Airlines Ilyushin Il-76 cargo plane carrying 9 crew members crashes in Afghanistan, while on approach to Bagram Air Base, killing everyone on board.

8 July

- Hewa Bora Airways Flight 952, a Boeing 727-100 crashes on approach to Bangoka International Airport, Kisangani, Democratic Republic of the Congo. 42 of the 118 people are killed.

11 July

- Angara Airlines Flight 9007, an Antonov An-24, ditches into the Ob River, Russia, killing seven of the 37 people on board.

13 July

- Noar Linhas Aéreas Flight 4896, a Let L-410UVP-E20 (registration PR-NOB) crashes near Recife, Brazil, killing all 16 people on board.

22 July

- The Space Shuttle Atlantis returns to Earth at the end of STS-135, the final mission of the Space Shuttle Program.

26 July

- A Royal Moroccan Air Force Lockheed C-130 Hercules transport aircraft crashes near Guelmim, Morocco, killing all 80 people on board and becoming the deadliest aviation disaster of 2011.

28 July

- Asiana Airlines Flight 991, a Boeing 747-400F crashes into the Korea Strait, killing two of its crew.
- In Senegal, the Agence Nationale de l'Aviation Civile et de la Météorologie (National Agency of Civil Aviation and Meteorology) is created by the merger of the country's national civil aviation authority, the Agence Nationale de l'Aviation Civile du Sénégal (National Agency of Civil Aviation of Senegal) with its national meteorology agency.

29 July

- EgyptAir Flight 667, a Boeing 777-200ER en route from Cairo to Jeddah, Saudi Arabia suffers a fire in the cockpit while on the ground return to Cairo. All 317 people on board survive.

30 July

- Caribbean Airlines Flight 523, a Boeing 737-800 overran the runway at Cheddi Jagan International Airport in Georgetown, Guyana. Seven of the 163 people suffered injuries.

=== August ===
17 August

- Kaltim Airlines is founded in Samarinda by Awang F. Ishak and Sabri Ramdhani.

20 August

- First Air Flight 6560 – a Boeing 737-210C (registration C-GNWN) with 15 people on board arriving from Yellowknife, Northwest Territories, Canada – drifts off course in poor visibility on final approach to Resolute Bay Airport at Resolute, Nunavut, Canada, and crashes into a hill a mile from the runway, killing 12 people on board and injuring all three survivors. Recovery of the survivors and investigation of the crash are aided greatly by the ongoing Canadian Armed Forces Operation Nanook 2011, which had planned to simulate an airliner disaster in the Resolute Bay area at the time of the crash, and by the prompt arrival of Transportation Safety Board of Canada investigators, who are aboard an aircraft flying to Resolute Bay at the time of crash to take part in the planned simulation.

=== September ===
2 September

- Trying to land for the third time in strong winds, a Chilean Air Force Casa C-212 Aviocar 300DF crashes into the Pacific Ocean on approach to Robinson Crusoe Island Airport on Robinson Crusoe Island in Chile's Juan Fernandez Islands, killing all 21 people on board. Popular Chilean television presenter Felipe Camiroaga is among the dead.

4 September

- At the Naval Air Station Patuxent River Air Expo in Maryland, the United States Navy's Blue Angels flight demonstration squadron uses a 50/50 blend of conventional jet fuel and a biofuel made from Camelina sativa, the first time an entire military aviation unit flies on a biofuel mix.

7 September

- A Yak-Service Yakovlev Yak-42D (registration RA-42434) fails to gain altitude on takeoff from Tunoshna Airport in Yaroslavl Oblast, Russia, and crashes 1 kilometer (0.62 miles) from the runway, killing 43 of the 45 people on board. Known as the 2011 Lokomotiv Yaroslavl plane crash, the Lokomotiv Yaroslavl professional ice hockey team is nearly completely killed in the crash; among the dead at the crash site are players Vitaly Anikeyenko, Mikhail Balandin, Gennady Churilov, Pavol Demitra, Robert Dietrich, Marat Kalimulin, Alexander Kalyanin, Andrei Kiryukhin, Nikita Klyukin, Stefan Liv, Jan Marek, Sergei Ostapchuk, Karel Rachůnek, Ruslan Salei, Maxim Shuvalov, Kārlis Skrastiņš, Pavel Snurnitsyn, Daniil Sobchenko, Ivan Tkachenko, Pavel Trakhanov, Yuri Urychev, Josef Vašíček, Alexander Vasyunov, Alexander Vyukhin, and Artem Yarchuk and coaches Alexander Karpovtsev, Igor Korolev, and Brad McCrimmon. The only team member to survive the immediate crash, Alexander Galimov, dies of his injuries on 12 September, leaving the airliner's avionics flight engineer as the only survivor.

16 September

- The North American P-51D Mustang The Galloping Ghost, flown by James K. "Jimmy" Leeward, crashes into box seats in front of the grandstand at the Reno Air Races at Reno Stead Airport north of Reno, Nevada. Leeward and 10 others are killed and 69 people are injured. It is the third-deadliest airshow accident in U.S. history and the deadliest aviation accident of any kind in the United States in two years.

26 September

- Boeing delivers its first Boeing 787 Dreamliner to a customer, All Nippon Airways, at Paine Field in Washington.

27–28 September

- All Nippon Airways flies the first delivery flight of a Boeing 787 Dreamliner, from Paine Field, Washington, to Tokyo International Airport.

30 September

- Selaparang Airport at Mataram on Lombok in Indonesia closes. It is replaced by the new Lombok International Airport.
- An American unmanned aerial vehicle strike in Yemen kills Anwar al-Aulaqi, an al-Qaeda recruiter and motivator, and Samir Khan, the editor of the English-language online magazine Inspire published by al-Qaeda in the Arabian Peninsula.

=== October ===
- Libyan Airlines aircraft fly for the first time since the United Nations military intervention in the Libyan Civil War began in March, operating on the Tripoli, Libya-to-Cairo, Egypt, route.
- Meridiana Fly acquires Air Italy.
- Key West International Airport receives approval to provide commercial air service between Key West, Florida, and Cuba. It will take more than two years for charter airline operators to receive all the necessary permissions to make the first flight, which will take place on 30 December 2013 as the first commercial flight between Key West and Cuba in over 50 years.

10 October

- Flying a modified Yakovlev Yak-3U powered by a Pratt & Whitney R-2000 engine, William Whiteside sets an official international speed record for piston-engined aircraft in the under−3,000 kg (−6,600 lb) category, reaching 655 km/h (407 mph) over a 3 km (1.9 mi) course at the Bonneville Salt Flats in Utah in the United States, greatly exceeding the previous record of 491 km/h (305 mph) set in 2002 by Jim Wright.

11 October

- Tripoli International Airport in Tripoli, Libya, officially reopens. It had been closed since 19 March, when international forces began to enforce a no-fly zone over Libya imposed by United Nations Security Council Resolution 1973.
- In the same modified Yak-3U, William Whiteside sets an unofficial speed record for piston-engined aircraft in the under−3,000 kg (−6,600 lb) category of 670 km/h (420 mph) over the same 3 km (1.9 mi) course at the Bonneville Salt Flats.

21 October

- An electric-powered multicopter achieves sustained flight without ground assistance for the first time, when the battery-powered, 16-rotor e-volo VC1 helicopter achieves an altitude of 3 meters (9.8 feet) for 90 seconds at Karlsruhe, Germany. The VC1 reportedly can remain airborne for 20 minutes on a single charge. The flight will win e-volo the Lindbergh Prize for advances in environmentally friendly ("green") aviation.

26 October

- All Nippon Airways flies the first commercial flight of a Boeing 787 Dreamliner, from Tokyo to Hong Kong.
- In response to an ongoing industrial dispute with three labor unions, all Qantas aircraft are grounded by Qantas chief executive officer Alan Joyce.

31 October

=== November ===
1 November

- LOT Polish Airlines Flight 16, a Boeing 767-300ER, makes a successful belly landing at Warsaw Chopin Airport in Warsaw, Poland, after its landing gear fails to extend due to hydraulic failure. None of the 231 occupants on board were injured.
- Switzerland's Aircraft Accident Investigation Bureau and Investigation Bureau for Railway, Funicular and Boat Accidents merge to form the Swiss Accident Investigation Board.

13 November

- The Dubai-based airline Emirates orders 50 Boeing 777 airliners worth about US$18,000,000,000 – the largest order in terms of commercial value in Boeing's history at the time – with an option to purchase 20 more 777s for another $8,000,000,000.

18 November

- Lion Air and Boeing sign the most valuable commercial order in history at the time, a $21,700,000,000 Lion Air order for 201 Boeing 737 MAX and 29 Boeing 737-900ER airliners. At 230 aircraft, it is also the single biggest order in history at the time for airliners in terms of the number of aircraft ordered. The deal also includes options for another 150 future aircraft for Lion Air.

=== December ===
4 December

- The low-cost Thai airline Thai Lion Air, a subsidiary of Lion Air, makes its first flight, flying on the Bangkok-Chiang Mai route. It begins full service the following day.

10 December

- Thai Lion Air and Malindo Air conclude an agreement allowing both airlines to serve the Bangkok-Kuala Lumpur route.

13 December

- Ethiopian Airlines joins the Star Alliance.

== First flights ==
=== January ===
- 11 January – Chengdu J-20 in China.
- 27 January – Sonex Aircraft Onex

=== February ===
- 4 February – Northrop Grumman X-47B Air Vehicle 1 (AV-1)

=== March ===
- 20 March – Boeing 747-8 Intercontinental in Everett, Washington.

=== April ===
- 27 April – Boeing Phantom Ray

=== June ===
- 24 June – Evektor EV-55 Outback

=== October ===
- 21 October – e-volo VC1

=== December ===
- 21 December – AgustaWestland AW189

== Entered service ==
- 26 October – Boeing 787 Dreamliner with All Nippon Airways.

== Deadliest crash ==
The deadliest crash of this year was a military accident, namely the 2011 Royal Moroccan Air Force C-130 crash, which crashed near Guelmim, Morocco on 26 July killing all 80 people on board. The deadliest commercial accident was Iran Air Flight 277, a Boeing 727 which crashed near Urmia, Iran on 9 January, killing 78 of the 105 people on board. This was the first year since 1964 without any crashes resulting in 100 or more fatalities.
