= University of Maryland Solar Gamera =

2010s United States solar-powered helicopter

General information
- Type: Solar-powered aircraft
- National origin: United States of America
- Manufacturer: University of Maryland
- Designer: A. James Clark School of Engineering students
- Status: First flight completed
- Number built: 1

History
- First flight: August 26, 2016
- Developed from: University of Maryland Gamera II

The University of Maryland Solar Gamera is a solar-powered helicopter. In August 2016, it made the first solar-powered helicopter flight.

== Development ==
The Solar Gamera, also known as the Gamera-S and the GameraS, used the structure and rotors of its predecessor, the Gamera II. Components of the power train for that human-powered helicopter (pedals, cranks, pulleys, etc.) were removed, and replaced with four electric motors, each connected via gearing to one of the craft's four rotors. Four panels, each containing 40 monocrystalline silicon solar cells, were located at outboard end of the frames leading to the rotors. Electronic controls, which incorporated an stability augmentation system, helped to ensure stable hover.

== Operational history ==
Testing commenced at College Park, Maryland in April 2015, but with no pilot aboard. Further tests were made later that year and in the Spring of 2016.

On August 26, 2016, with pilot Michelle Mahon at the controls, the Solar Gamera made two flights, these being the first ever made by a piloted solar-powered helicopter. During the first flight, the helicopter hovered for 9 seconds, and attained a height of 1 ft (0.3 m).

== Specifications (Solar Gamera) ==
Data from Gamera: A Human Powered Helicopter

General characteristics

- Crew: 1
- Airfoil: Selig S8037
- Empty weight: 51.3 kg (113 lb)
- Powerplant: 4 × solar-powered electric motors , 1.2 kW (1.6 hp) each
- Main rotor diameter: 4 × 14.4 m (47 ft 3 in)
- Cruise speed: 0 km/h (0 mph, 0 kn)
- Range: 0 km (0 mi, 0 nmi)
- Endurance: 9 seconds
- Service ceiling: 0.3 m (0.98 ft)

== See also ==
- University of Maryland Gamera I
- University of Maryland Gamera II

Aircraft of comparable role, configuration, and era

- AeroVelo Atlas
- California Polytechnic State University Da Vinci III
