= Termon (disambiguation) =

Termon is a village in the north of County Donegal, Ireland.

Termon or Tarmon may also refer to:

- Termonn, land belonging to a monastery in Gaelic Ireland
- Termon River, County Donegal
- Termonfeckin, County Louth
- Termon, County Cavan, see List of townlands in County Cavan
- Termon, County Clare, see List of townlands in County Clare
- Termon, County Galway, see List of townlands in County Galway
- Termon, County Mayo, see List of townlands in County Mayo
- Termon, County Roscommon, see List of townlands in County Roscommon
- Tarmonbarry, County Roscommon
- Tarmon, County Clare, see List of townlands in County Clare
- Tarmon, County Leitrim, see List of townlands in County Leitrim

== See also ==
- Tarmon Gai'don, battle in The Wheel of Time fantasy fiction series
- Tamron, a Japanese company manufacturing photographic lenses
- Tarmani, village in Iran
