= Yuri I =

Yuri I may refer to:

- Yuri Dolgorukiy (died 1157), prince of Rostov and Suzdal, grand prince of Kiev
- Yuri I of Galicia (died 1310/1315), king of Ruthenia, prince of Volhynia

== See also ==
- Yuri I, human-powered helicopter
- Yuri II
