= University of Maryland Gamera I =

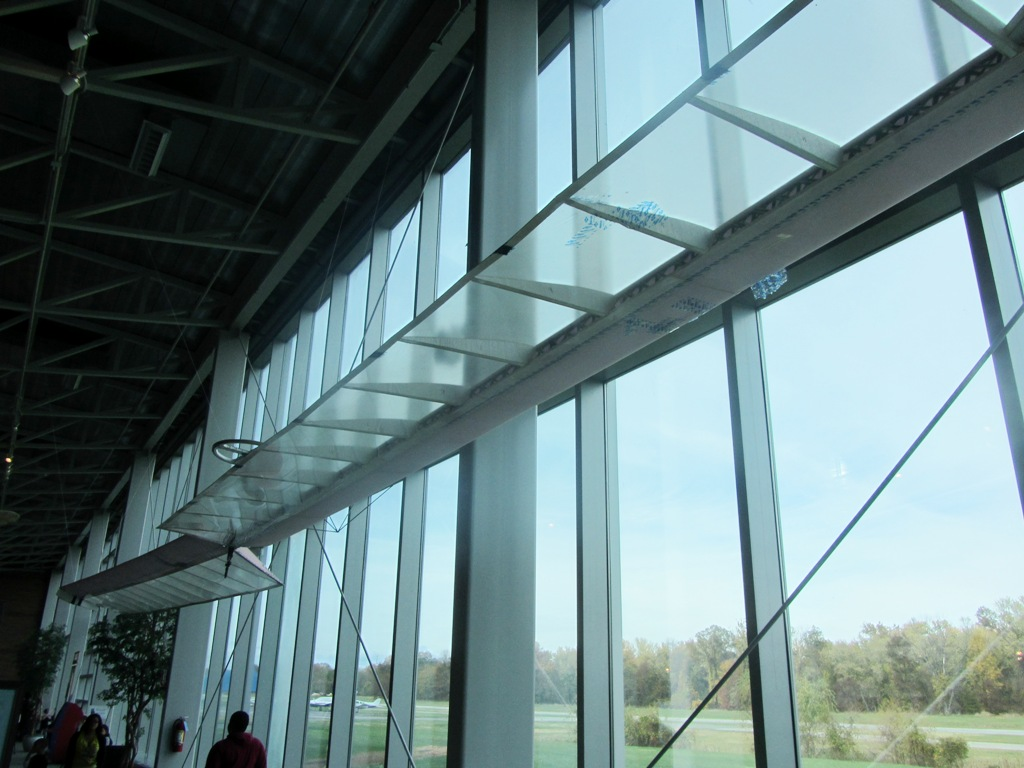
- One of four Gamera Rotors on Display at College Park Air Museum

General information
- Type: Human-powered helicopter
- National origin: United States of America
- Manufacturer: University of Maryland
- Designer: A. James Clark School of Engineering students
- Status: Flights completed. Pieces on display
- Number built: 1

History
- First flight: May 11, 2011 5:30pm Eastern
- Developed into: University of Maryland Gamera II

The University of Maryland Gamera I is a human-powered helicopter designed to win the $250,000 Sikorsky Prize.

== Development ==
The Gamera I is purpose-designed quadrotor helicopter to meet the criteria of the 1980 Sikorsky Prize. Two other teams have made prize attempts unsuccessfully, The Da Vinci III, built by a team at the California Polytechnic State University in 1989 and the Yuri I. At the time the world record was of 19.46 seconds of flight at 0.2 m (7.9 in) altitude made by the Yuri I helicopter developed by Nihon University. University of Maryland professor Fred Schmitz proposed an attempt at the prize for the engineering students, with Inderjit Chopra leading the effort.

The requirements to win the Sikorsky Prize include achieving a flight duration of 60 seconds and reaching an altitude of 3 m (9 ft 10 in). At the same time the aircraft must prove that it is controllable by remaining within a 10 m (32 ft 10 in) circle.

Since the University of Maryland's mascot is a terrapin turtle, the craft is named Gamera, a nod to popular Japanese Kaiju series of films featuring a flying turtle.

== Design ==
Gamera I consists of a X-shaped fuselage frame spanning 60 ft (18 m). At the terminus of each end of the frame resides a 42 ft (13 m) long rotor. The structure uses combinations of balsa, foam, mylar, and carbon fiber. Composite materials are assembled using filament winding construction for maximum strength to stiffness ratios. The vehicle weighs 101 lb (46 kg), each rotor weighs 7 lb (3.2 kg) each, and the powerplant/pilot weighs 107 lb (49 kg). Power is transferred to the rotors via hand and foot pedals in a pod suspended beneath the structure. The rotor speed required for flight is approximately 18 rpm. An extra 10 percent power is achieved using this more complex method rather than pedal power alone. The rotors operate in extreme ground effect, a distance of less than five percent of the rotor length from its operating height. The cockpit was modified on May 10, due to structure flexing at speed.

== Operational history ==
The pilot and powerplant for the Sikorsky record attempt is 24-year-old life sciences graduate student Judy Wexler. The amount of sustained power required of the pilot is around 1 horsepower (0.75 kW). The ultralight flight attempt was legally performed within the Washington, DC Metropolitan Area Special Flight Rules Area by operating indoors at the Comcast Center Auxiliary Gym in College Park, Maryland.

On 11 May, three test attempts were made bringing the rotors up to 18 rpm. Later at 5:30 pm the aircraft became airborne a few inches above the ground for at least 4 seconds. The flight is officially sanctioned to be the first flight of a human-powered helicopter by a female.

On 13 July 2011 the Gamera I (piloted again by Wexler) was certified by the National Aeronautic Association, and later the FAI to have flown in controlled hover for 11.4 seconds. The attempt set new United States records for flight duration and flight duration by a female pilot in a human-powered helicopter. The team was awarded the Igor I. Sikorsky International Trophy from American Helicopter Society, American Helicopter Museum and Education Center's Annual Achievement Award, the MTech Innovation Award, and was selected as a finalist for the 2012 Collier Trophy in the same group as the Boeing 787 project. The University continued the effort for 2012 with the development of the Gamera II, renaming the Gamera to the Gamera I.

== Display ==
Components of the Gamera I are on display at the College Park Aviation Museum.

== Specifications (University of Maryland Gamera I) ==
Data from Popular Science

General characteristics

- Crew: 1
- Empty weight: 101 lb (46 kg)
- Gross weight: 208 lb (94 kg)
- Powerplant: 1 × Judy Wexler Human, 1 hp (0.75 kW) 120 rpm
- Main rotor diameter: 4 × 42 ft (13 m)

Performance

== See also ==
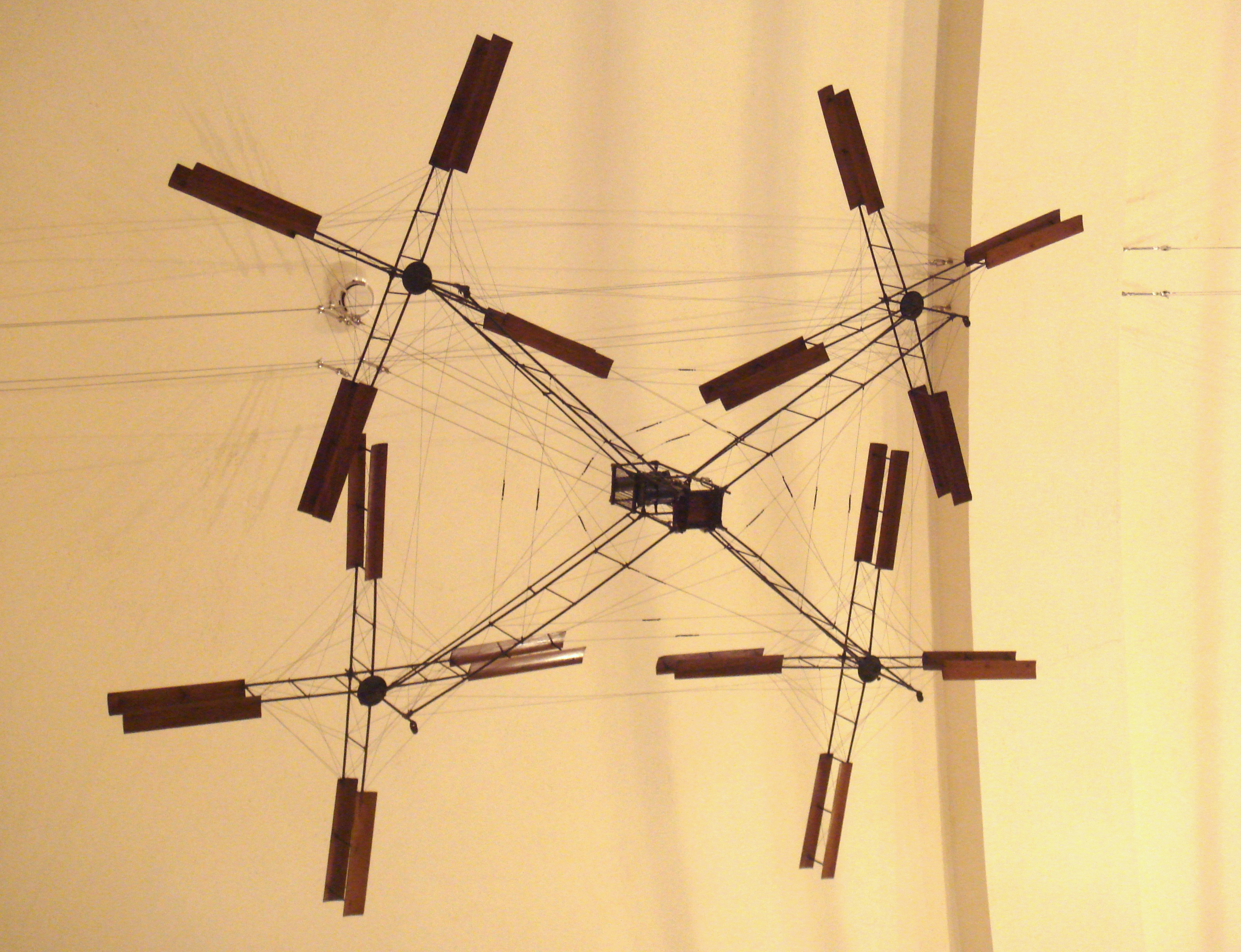
The 1907 Breguet Gyroplane with a quad rotor design.

- Gossamer Albatross – Human powered airplane winner of the Kremer prize.
- Breguet-Richet Gyroplane – A powered quad-rotor design from 1907.

Aircraft of comparable role, configuration, and era

- University of Maryland Gamera II Human Powered Helicopter
- University of Maryland Solar Gamera
- California Polytechnic State University Da Vinci III
- AeroVelo Atlas Human powered helicopter
- Saiki Upturn Human powered helicopter
