= 2011 Royal Moroccan Air Force C-130 crash =

Fatal aviation accident near Guelmim, Morocco

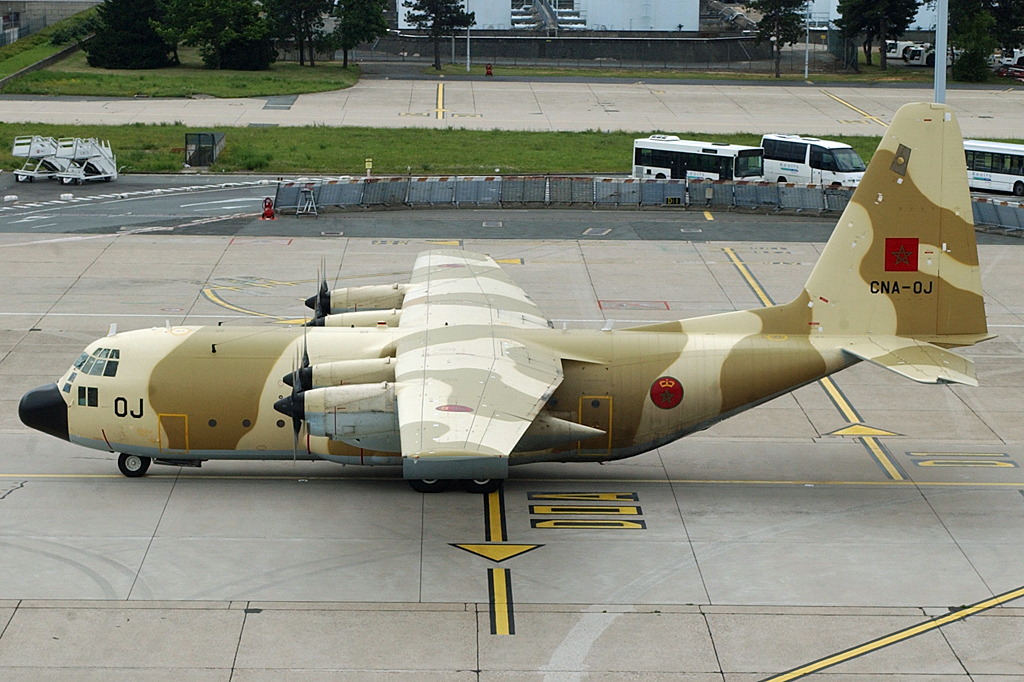
- A Moroccan Air Force C-130H Hercules similar to the one involved

Accident
- Date: 26 July 2011
- Summary: Under investigation
- Site: Near Guelmim Airport, Guelmim, Morocco; 29°03′N 9°56′W

Aircraft
- Aircraft type: Lockheed C-130H Hercules
- Operator: Royal Moroccan Air Force
- Registration: CNA-OQ
- Flight origin: Dakhla Airport, Dakhla, Morocco
- Stopover: Guelmim Airport, Guelmim, Morocco
- Destination: Kenitra Air Base, Kenitra, Morocco
- Occupants: 80
- Passengers: 71
- Crew: 9
- Fatalities: 80
- Survivors: 0

On 26 July 2011, a C-130 Hercules military transport aircraft operated by the Royal Moroccan Air Force crashed near Guelmim, Morocco, killing all 80 people on board. The plane was carrying 71 passengers (initially reported as 72), mostly members of the Moroccan Armed Forces, and nine crew. Three occupants were pulled alive from the wreckage but later died of their injuries.

== Accident ==
The aircraft involved, a four-engined Lockheed C-130H Hercules with registration CNA-OQ, was travelling from Dakhla Airport in Morocco to Kenitra Air Base, with a scheduled stopover at Guelmim.

While approaching Guelmim Airport, the Hercules crashed into Tayyert Mountain, approximately 10 kilometres (6.2 mi; 5.4 nmi) north-east of Guelmin. At that time, the weather in the area was reported as poor.

It was the deadliest aviation accident of 2011, and Morocco's deadliest military aviation disaster.

King Mohammed VI announced three days of national mourning following the crash.

== See also ==
- List of accidents and incidents involving the Lockheed C-130 Hercules
