= Iran Air Flight 277 =

2011 plane crash in Iran

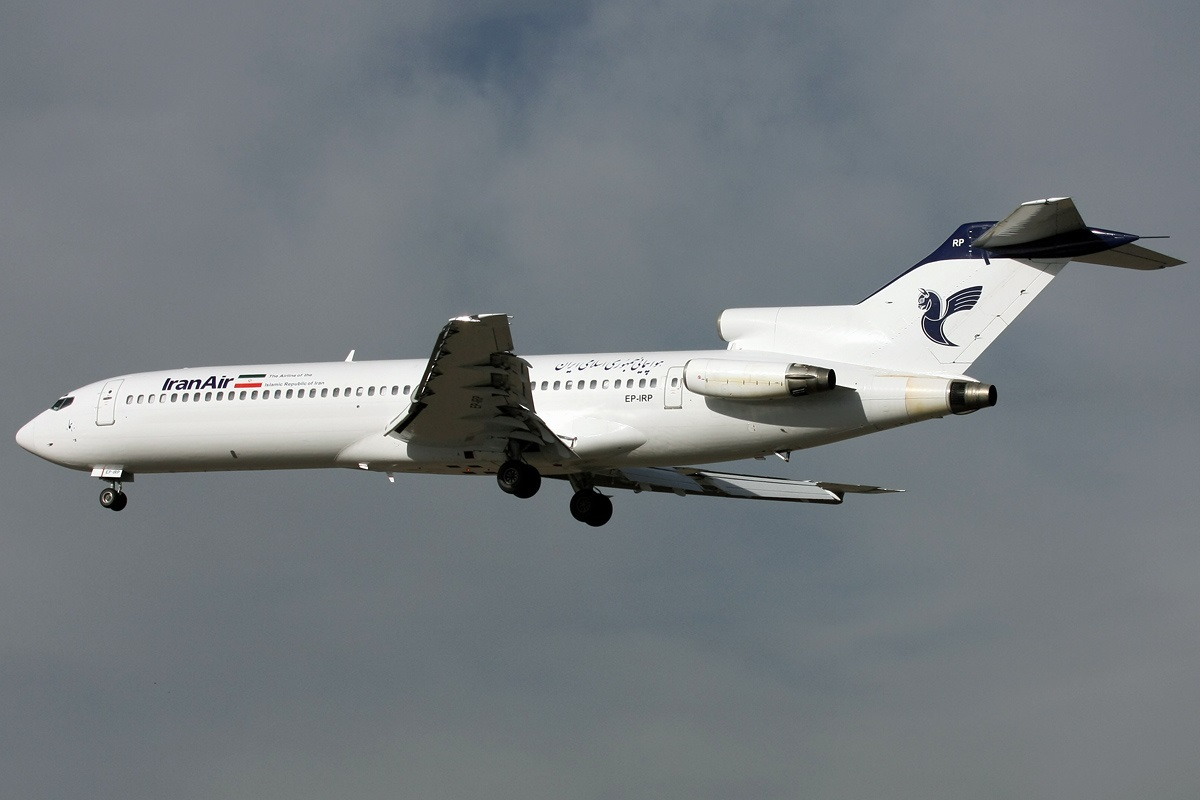
- EP-IRP, the aircraft involved in the accident, seen in 2010

Accident
- Date: 9 January 2011
- Summary: Crashed following double engine flame-out in icing conditions
- Site: Tarmani, Urmia County, near Urmia Airport, Urmia, Iran; 37°33′10″N 45°09′56″E

Aircraft
- Aircraft type: Boeing 727-286Adv
- Operator: Iran Air
- IATA flight No.: IR277
- ICAO flight No.: IRA277
- Call sign: IRANAIR 277
- Registration: EP-IRP
- Flight origin: Mehrabad International Airport, Tehran, Iran
- Destination: Urmia Airport, Urmia, Iran
- Occupants: 105
- Passengers: 96
- Crew: 9
- Fatalities: 78
- Injuries: 27
- Survivors: 27

Iran Air Flight 277 was a scheduled Iran Air flight from Mehrabad International Airport, Tehran to Urmia Airport, Iran. On 9 January 2011, the Boeing 727 serving the flight crashed after an aborted approach to Urmia Airport in poor weather. Of the 105 people on board, 78 were killed. The official investigation concluded that icing conditions and incorrect engine management by the crew led to a double engine flame-out, loss of altitude and impact with the ground.

== Background ==
=== Aircraft ===
The aircraft involved was a tri-jet Boeing 727-286Adv registered as EP-IRP with serial number 20945. Since being delivered to Iran Air in 1974, the aircraft had spent 18 years out of service. It was impounded at Baghdad, Iraq from 1984 to 1990, and then placed in storage from 1991 to 2002. It was then overhauled and returned to service.

=== Crew ===
The pilot in command was 50-year-old Captain Fereydoun Dadras, who had a total of 7,878 flight hours, with 3,322 hours on the Boeing 727, including 2,087 as a captain. The co-pilot was 30-year-old First Officer Mohammad Reza Qarehtapeh, who had a total of 600 flight hours, with 386 hours on the Boeing 727. Flight Engineer Morteza Rastegar, aged 55, had 8,232 flight hours logged on the Boeing 727.

== Accident ==
Flight 277 had taken off from Mehrabad International Airport, Tehran, at 18:15 local time (15:15 UTC), more than two hours later than scheduled because of poor weather at the destination.

At around 19:00 local time (16:00 UTC), while on approach to Urmia Airport, the crew initiated a missed approach procedure and announced its intention to return to Tehran. At the time, the weather at Urmia was poor, with the lowest clouds at 1,500 ft (460 m) and visibility of 800 metres (2,600 ft) in heavy snow.

Contact with the flight was lost shortly after. The aircraft crashed near the village of Tarmani, around 15 kilometres (9 mi; 8 nmi) south-east of Urmia Airport, breaking into multiple sections. Of the 96 passengers and 9 crew on board, only 27 survived. It was the deadliest civil aviation accident in 2011.

== Casualties ==
Of the 105 people on board, 78 were killed (including the flight crew) and 27 survived, all with injuries. Most of the victims sustained neck and spinal cord injuries. In the aftermath of the crash, 36 ambulances and 11 hospitals were utilized in the rescue operations. Rescue efforts were complicated by extremely heavy snow in the area, which was reportedly around 70 cm (28 in) deep at the crash site.

== Investigation ==
Iran's Civil Aviation Authority (CAA.IRI) opened an inquiry into the crash. The day after the accident, both the flight's cockpit voice recorder (CVR) and the flight data recorder (FDR) were recovered and taken to Tehran for analysis.

In 2017, CAO.IRI published its final accident report. From its analysis, it emerged that after starting its final approach to Urmia Airport's runway 21 from an altitude of 7,000 feet (2,100 m) – Urmia Airport being at an elevation of 4,300 feet (1,300 m) – a navigational error by the flight crew meant that the aircraft failed to establish itself on the instrument landing system. Descending through 5,900 ft (1,800 m) and having never made visual contact with the runway, the crew elected to go around. The missed approach procedure started normally, with the aircraft climbing to 8,800 feet (2,700 m).

Investigators believe the aircraft encountered severe icing conditions, which caused disruption of the airflow and loss of engine thrust. The aircraft started to descend and entered a turn that momentarily reached 41° bank angle, causing the activation of the stick shaker. Despite application of full thrust, engines No. 1 and 3 began to run down. As the aircraft descended through 7,000 feet (2,100 m), the flight engineer could be heard announcing that both engines had failed. Subsequent attempts to restart them were unsuccessful. During the last moments of the flight, flaps were retracted and the airspeed progressively decayed; at 4,400 feet (1,300 m), just 100 feet (30 m) above terrain, the aircraft was flying at 112 knots (207 km/h; 129 mph) with 21° right bank. The last recorded airspeed value was 69 knots (128 km/h; 79 mph). The aircraft struck terrain at 4,307 feet (1,313 m) above mean sea level (MSL).

The report concluded that the main causes of the accident were severe icing conditions and inappropriate actions by the flight crew. Obsolete on-board systems, absence of suitable simulators for adverse weather conditions, failure to follow standard operating procedures, and inadequate crew resource management were cited as contributing factors.

== See also ==
- List of accidents and incidents involving commercial aircraft
