= Tarmani =

Tarmani ترمني
- Village
- Location within Iran
- Coordinates: 37°32′48″N 45°09′50″E
- Country: Iran
- Province: West Azerbaijan
- County: Urmia
- Bakhsh: Central
- Rural District: Bakeshluchay

Population (2006)
  - Total: 143
- Time zone: UTC+3:30 (IRST)
  - Summer (DST): UTC+4:30 (IRDT)

Tarmani (Persian: تَرمنی, romanized: Tarmanī; Syriac: Tarmāni) (Note: Also known as Tarmāné, Tarmoni, or Termani.) is a village in Bakeshluchay Rural District, in the Central District of Urmia County, West Azerbaijan Province, Iran. At the 2006 census, its population was 143, in 40 families.

== History ==
Tarmāni was inhabited by 10 Church of the East Christian families with no church or priest in 1862, according to the Russian archimandrite Sophoniah, at which time it was served by the priests ʿAbdīshōʿ and Yatgar of Gūlpāshān. The Church of St ‘Avd-Īsho‘ at Tarmāni was constructed in the late 19th century. There were 18 Church of the East Christian families at Tarmāni with 1 church and no priest in 1877, as per Edward Lewes Cutts. Basil Nikitin recorded that the village was populated by Christians and Muslims just before the First World War. Prior to the First World War, there were 120 Assyrian houses at Tarmāni, as per the list presented by Agha Petros to the Lausanne Peace Conference in 1922. It was located in the Baranduz District.

On 9 January 2011, Iran Air Flight 277 crashed near the village, killing 78 people.

== Bibliography ==
- Al-Jeloo, Nicholas (2015). "Persian Christians: Assyrian art and architecture of Urmia as an example of regional cultural expression". Parole de l’Orient. 40: 13–27.
- Gaunt, David (2006). Massacres, Resistance, Protectors: Muslim-Christian Relations in Eastern Anatolia during World War I. Gorgias Press.
- Wilmshurst, David (2000). The Ecclesiastical Organisation of the Church of the East, 1318–1913 (PDF). Peeters Publishers.
