= 2013 Helicópteros del Pacífico Mil Mi-8 crash =

Helicopter crash in Loreto, Peru

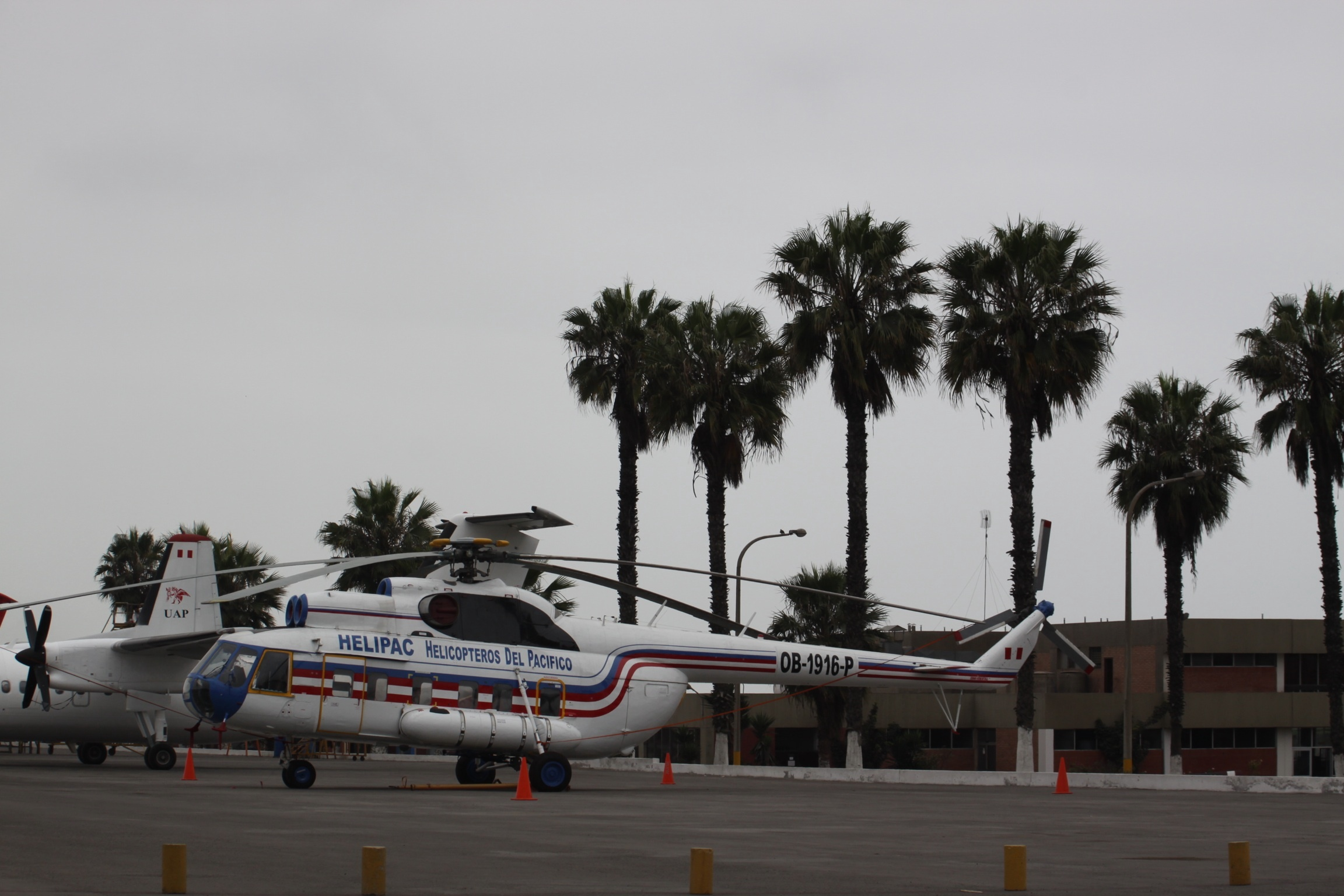
- OB-1916-P, the aircraft involved in the accident, seen in 2012

Accident
- Date: 7 April 2013
- Summary: Tail rotor control failure due to improper equipment stowage
- Site: Near Lot 27, Perenco site, Loreto, Peru; 01°38′07.54″S 75°01′57.56″W

Aircraft
- Aircraft type: Mil Mi-8P
- Operator: Helicópteros del Pacífico
- Registration: OB-1916-P
- Flight origin: Iquitos, Loreto, Peru
- Destination: Lot 67, Perenco site, Loreto, Peru
- Occupants: 13
- Passengers: 9
- Crew: 4
- Fatalities: 13
- Survivors: 0

On 7 April 2013, a Mil Mi-8 helicopter operated by Helicópteros del Pacífico (Helipac) broke up in flight and crashed en route from Iquitos to a Perenco site near the Curaray River, in the Loreto Region of Peru. All 13 people on board were killed. The occupants, all Peruvian nationals, were nine passengers and four crew. Among the passengers were Perenco workers and other contractors.

== Investigation ==
The accident investigation by the Peruvian Comisión De Investigación De Accidentes De Aviación (Aviation Accidents Investigation Commission) established that while the aircraft was cruising at an altitude of 700 metres (2,300 ft), a luggage net that was improperly placed in a rear fuselage compartment became entangled with the tail rotor's transmission shaft and control cables, causing the cables to snap and resulting in a total loss of directional control.

The crew then attempted an emergency landing by performing an autorotation, but likely over-control by the pilot while flaring over densely forested terrain resulted in the main rotor's blades striking the tail boom, severing it from the fuselage. The aircraft then crashed to the ground out of control.
