= University of Maryland Gamera II =

General information
- Type: Human-powered helicopter
- National origin: United States of America
- Manufacturer: University of Maryland
- Designer: A. James Clark School of Engineering students
- Status: First flight completed
- Number built: 1

History
- First flight: June 20, 2012
- Developed from: University of Maryland Gamera I Human Powered Helicopter
- Developed into: University of Maryland Solar Gamera

The University of Maryland Gamera II is an improved human-powered helicopter designed to win the US$250,000 Sikorsky Prize.

== Development ==
The Gamera II is a quadrotor helicopter purpose-designed to attempt an official flight duration record sanctioned by the National Aeronautic Association, and is a step in the progression of designs built to meet the criteria of the 1980 American Helicopter Society Igor I. Sikorsky Human Powered Helicopter Competition. It is the advanced follow-on model of the Gamera I developed the year prior. Two other teams have made Sikorsky Prize attempts unsuccessfully. On June 13, 2013, the University of Toronto Team's AeroVelo Atlas, managed to keep its helicopter in the air for 64.11 seconds, reach a peak altitude of 3.3 meters and drift no more than 9.8 meters from the starting point, claiming the prize.

The requirements to win the Sikorsky Prize include achieving a flight duration of 60 seconds and reaching an "altitude" of 3 m (9 ft 10 in). At the same time the aircraft must prove that it is controllable by remaining within a 10 m (32 ft 10 in) square.

Since the University of Maryland's mascot is a terrapin turtle, the craft is named Gamera II, a tribute to popular Japanese Kaiju series of films featuring a flying turtle Gamera.

== Design ==
Gamera consists of an X-shaped fuselage frame using a micro truss structure that helped reduce overall weight by 33% from the Gamera I. The transmission, cockpit and rotors have been refined from the original Gamera I. The transmission now includes a flywheel to reduce "jerky" impulses on the rotors. The rotor weight was reduced by 39% by reducing material in the webbing of the triangular truss spars that deflect only 1 ft versus 25 inches on Gamera I. The rotors are now tapered with a Selig S8037 airfoil and rigged with a 3° anhedral to compensate for coning so the blades fly almost level with the ground. 35% less power is required to hover the Gamera II than the Gamera I with the same weight pilots.

At the terminus of each end of the frame resides a rotor. Each rotor weighs 2 kg (4.4 lb), and the powerplant/pilot weighs 135 lb (61 kg) to 145 lb (66 kg). Power is transferred to the rotors via hand and foot pedals in a pod suspended beneath the structure. Up to 20% additional power for the 60 second runtime is achieved using this more complex method rather than pedal power alone. Like a pull-starter on a lawn mower, the transmission spools in a length of Spectra line in order to spin the rotors. There is enough line to spool the rotors 90 seconds. The line needs to be rewound for each effort, but weighs significantly less than a continuous chain or belt drive. The rotors operate in extreme ground effect, a distance of less than 5% of the rotor length from its operating height. Ideal operation is at 90 rpm for the "engine" and 20 rpm for the rotors.

== Operational history ==
Construction began in November 2011. On June 20, 2012, Colin Gore flew the Gamera II at the Reckord Armory on the University of Maryland Campus for a duration of 35 seconds, setting a new world record for human powered helicopter flight duration. With engineering improvements, the team bested the Gamera I endurance effort by 24 seconds. One day later, on June 21, 2012, Kyle Gluesenkamp flew the Gamera II for an unofficial world record of 50 seconds. The time will be submitted to the National Aeronautic Association by judge Kris Maynard and the validation process will likely take a few weeks.

On August 28, 2012, University of Maryland freshman Henry Enerson flew the Gamera II to a world record height of 8 ft (2.4 m) above ground level.

On August 28, 2012, Colin Gore powered the Gamera II for 65.1 seconds, within a 10-meter x 10-meter area. Two of the three criteria prescribed to meet the American Helicopter Society Sikorsky Prize competition were achieved, with only hover height falling short. Sonar altimeters and a modified transmission were added for the effort.

On June 13, 2013, the Canadian AeroVelo Atlas met the criteria for the Sikorsky Prize.

On June 26, 2013, the Gamera II set an unofficial world record for human powered helicopter endurance of 74 seconds.

On September 25, 2013, pilot Justin Mauch powered Gamera IID (a modified version of Gamera II) for a certified U.S. record and pending world record flight duration of 97.5 seconds. On the same day, female pilot Kay Tsui set a new U.S. record for a flight duration of 38 seconds.

== Specifications (Gamera II XR) ==
Data from UMD, PRWIRE

General characteristics

- Crew: 1
- Airfoil: Selig S8037
- Empty weight: 82 lb (37 kg)
- Powerplant: 1 × human , 0.63 hp (0.47 kW) @ 95rpm
- Main rotor diameter: 4 × 47 ft 3 in (14.4 m)
- Cruise speed: 0 kn (0 mph, 0 km/h)
- Range: 0 nmi (0 mi, 0 km)
- Endurance: 97.5 Sec
- Service ceiling: 10.8 ft (3.3 m)

== See also ==
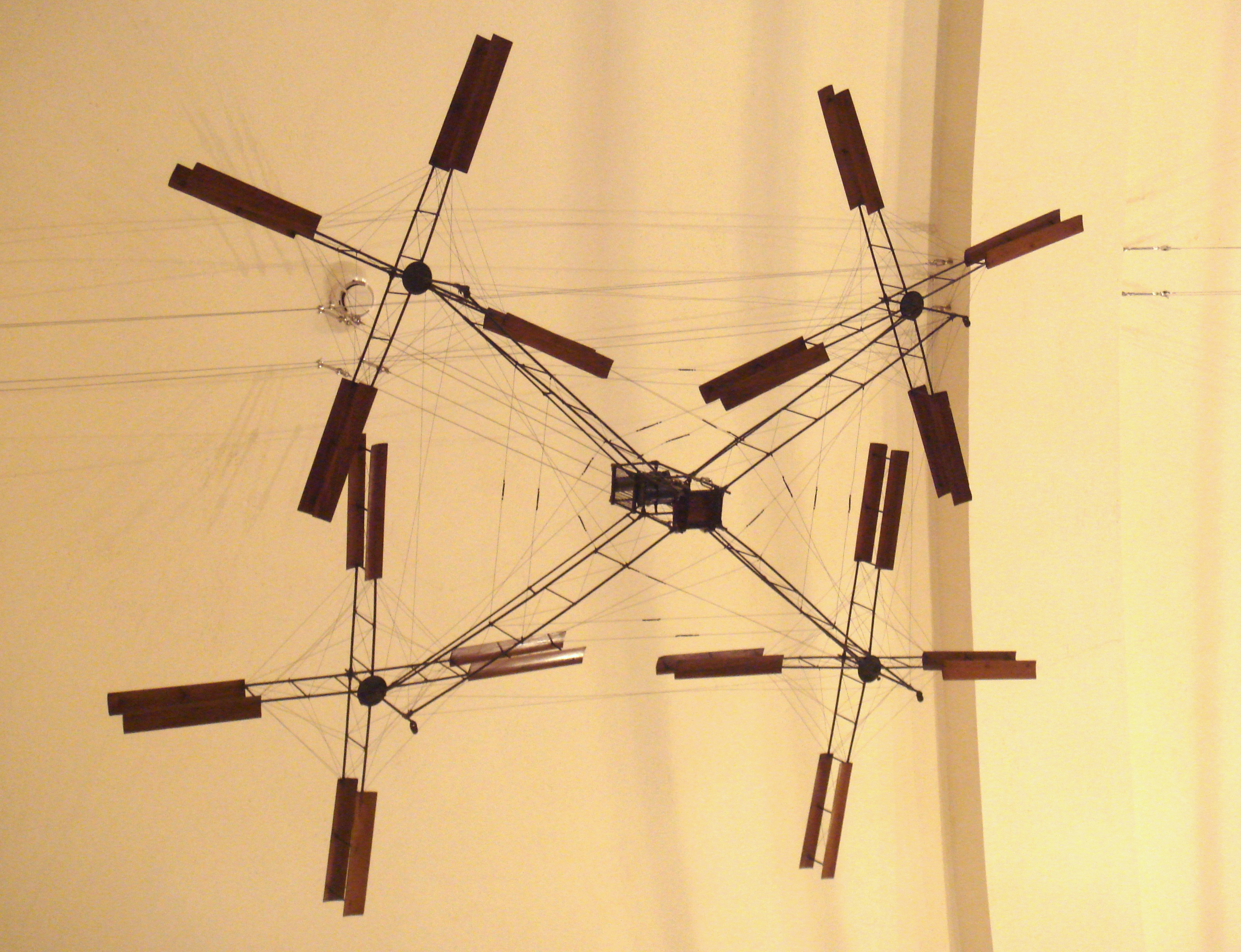
The 1907 Breguet Gyroplane with a quadrotor design

- University of Maryland Gamera I Human Powered Helicopter
- University of Maryland Solar Gamera
- Gossamer Condor – Human powered airplane winner of the Kremer prize
- Gossamer Albatross – Human powered airplane winner of second the Kremer prize for crossing the English Channel
- Breguet-Richet Gyroplane – A powered quadrotor design from 1907

Aircraft of comparable role, configuration, and era

- California Polytechnic State University Da Vinci III
- AeroVelo Atlas
