= Tracey Curtis-Taylor =

British aviator (born 1962)

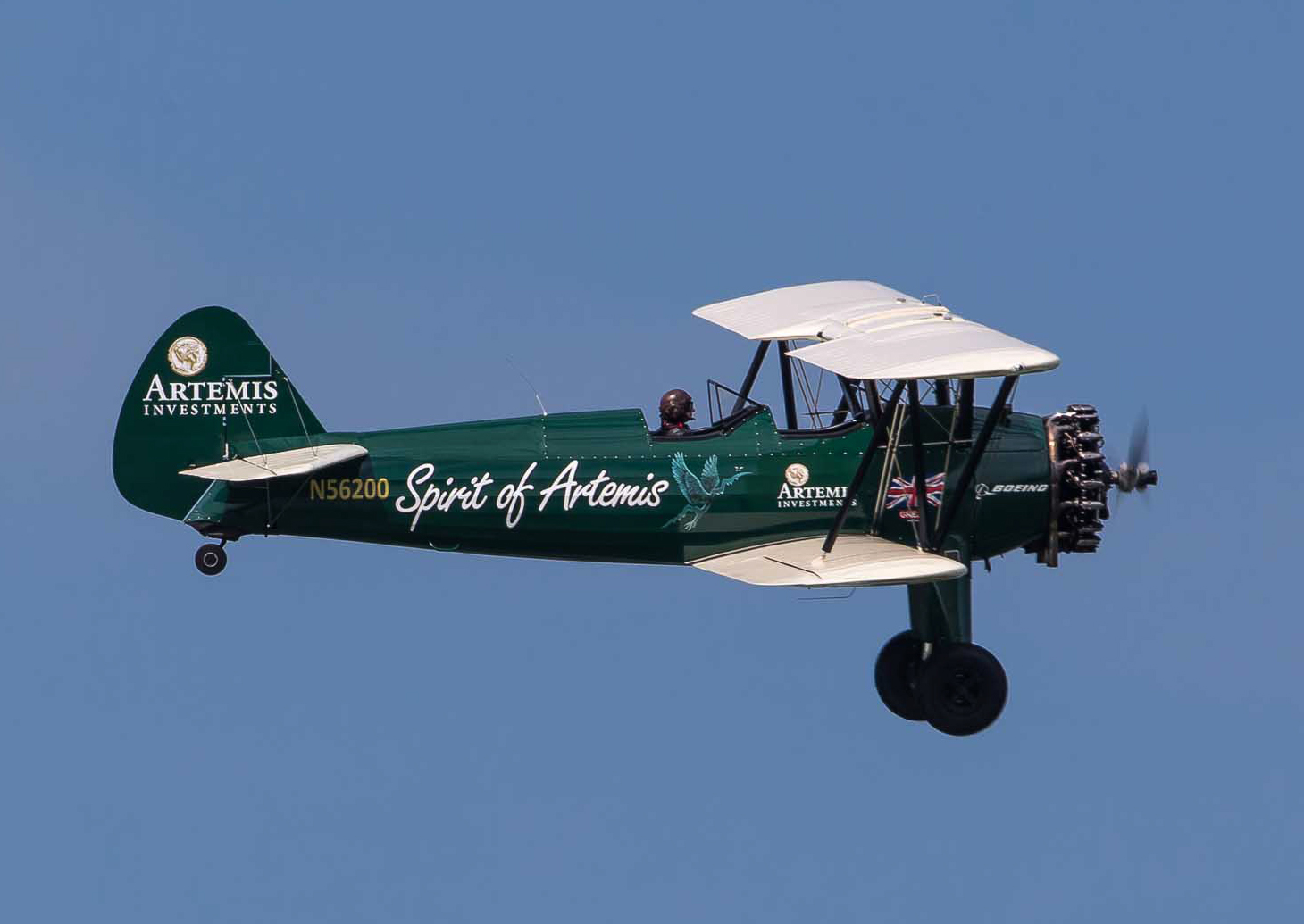
- Spirit of Artemis flown by Curtis-Taylor, Amy Johnson Memorial Air Show, Herne Bay, August 2015
- Born: Tracey Curtis; 1962 (age 63–64); Stamford, Lincolnshire, England
- Occupation: aviator

Tracey Curtis-Taylor (born 1962) is a British aviator who has organised and piloted multiple flight expeditions with historic aircraft across Asia, Europe, Africa, Australia and America.

== Early life ==
Curtis-Taylor was born in Stamford, Lincolnshire in 1962 and grew up in Cumbria.

She initially became interested in aviation while visiting air shows on the west coast of Canada with her family; her father in particular had a passion for vintage cars and planes. She had her first flying lesson at the age of 16, in British Columbia. She started to fly more regularly while living in New Zealand in the early 1980s, first in Queenstown and later at Ardmore Aerodrome in Auckland. In Auckland she earned her private and commercial pilot's licences, and her instructor rating. While living in New Zealand, she joined the New Zealand Warbirds and began to fly vintage planes and to learn aerobatics and formation flying.

== Aviation career ==
In the late 1990s, Curtis-Taylor was involved in the organization of the Flying Legends show at Duxford Aerodrome, England.

From 2008 until 2013 she took part in fly-bys at Old Warden Aerodrome in Bedfordshire, England, often flying a Ryan PT-22 military trainer. In 2011, she flew in the Flying Legends show at Duxford Aerodrome.

In December 2012, Curtis-Taylor was part of a four-person Russian crew that was flying an Antonov An-2 biplane from Kyiv to deliver in Cape Town, arriving in February 2013.

She flew at the Amy Johnson Memorial Air Show at Herne Bay, Kent, England, in 2015 as well as the Cowes Regatta in 2013, 2014 and 2015.

=== Cape Town to Goodwood flight, 2013 ===
In 2013, Curtis-Taylor flew in a Boeing-Stearman biplane in an eight-week journey, covering over 13,000 km, from Cape Town, South Africa to the Goodwood Aerodrome in West Sussex, England. The journey comprised a total of 38 legs and 110 basic VFR flying hours, and followed the 1928 flight of Mary, Lady Heath, from Cape Town to Cairo, Egypt, travelling over Zimbabwe, Zambia, Tanzania, Kenya, Uganda and Sudan. One section of Lady Heath's flight, the leg through Libya, could not be completed due to security issues.

The journey took five years to prepare for, including finding a biplane which would cope with the heat of Africa. After a search in several countries, Curtis-Taylor decided to have a 1942 Boeing-Stearman restored. Designed in the early 1930s, the biplane was similar to Lady Heath's in size and design, but had a more powerful engine, additional fuel tanks, a GPS navigation system, and a transponder for use in controlled airspace. One of the legs of the journey was shared with a retired Royal Air Force Group Captain pilot and historian, Bill Sykes, and sought to locate the site where Lady Heath crash-landed in 1928.

She also sourced sponsors for the trip, including Boeing and ExecuJet Aviation Group. The main sponsor was Artemis Investment Management, and the biplane was hence named Spirit of Artemis.

=== Farnborough to Sydney flight, 2015–16 ===
On 1 October 2015 Curtis-Taylor departed from Farnborough, England, flying in Spirit of Artemis, arriving in Sydney, Australia on 9 January 2016. The journey was inspired by pioneer aviator Amy Johnson, who flew solo from England to Australia in 1930. The flight path was across 23 countries in 50 legs. She was accompanied by a small support crew in a modern plane who documented the journey.

Several stopovers were scheduled into the flight, often with the aim of introducing Curtis-Taylor to local communities and to inspire others, particularly women. In Dubai, Curtis-Taylor was a keynote speaker at the International Aviation Women's Association conference.

In Pakistan, Curtis-Taylor was hosted by Squadron Leader Saira Batool of the Pakistani Air Force, and visited a school in Karachi with Pakistani mountaineer Samina Baig to speak about their adventures and to inspire the children. In Singapore, she met with girls and women involved in the UN Women programme Girls2Pioneers, which aims to encourage young women into STEM careers.

=== US Transcontinental Flight, 2016–17 ===
In spring 2016, Curtis-Taylor started a US Transcontinental Flight, with multiple stops along the historic US Airmail Routes, flying from Seattle to Los Angeles and the Transcontinental route from LA to NY. The trip was cut short by a crash in the desert, at Winslow, Arizona, due to a loss of engine power. The NTSB investigation reported that "a gray / tan liquid was drained from the carburetor". She and her co-pilot were uninjured but the Boeing Stearman was badly damaged. It was airlifted from Phoenix to Hungary, where it was rebuilt in time to attend the 2016 Farnborough International Airshow, which celebrated Boeing's centenary year. She returned with her Boeing Stearman to LA in June 2017 . At this point the Stearman changed its sponsored name Spirit of Artemis (an investment company) to Spirit of Victory (non-sponsored).

The flight across the US concluded with a finale at the American Airpower Museum at Republic Airport. This completed the World Flight, flying across five continents. On both US tours the Stearman biplane was shipped across the Pacific and Atlantic Oceans, as it does not have the fuel range or instrumentation to cover such distances.

== Awards ==
In October 2014, the Light Aircraft Association awarded Curtis-Taylor the Bill Woodhams Trophy for a "feat of navigation, aviation, tenacity and endurance" on her flight from Cape Town to the United Kingdom.

In October 2015, she was appointed an Honorary Lieutenant Commander in the Royal Navy Reserve.

In May 2016, the Air League presented her with a framed address in recognition of her flight from Farnborough to Sydney.

In July 2016, the University of Portsmouth, England, awarded her an honorary doctorate degree. Also in 2016, the Honourable Company of Air Pilots awarded her its Masters Medal for her work in "raising awareness of science and technology in general, and aviation in particular, amongst young women across the world".

In October 2016 members of the Light Aircraft Association voted to rescind the award they had made in October 2014. In a written statement, Curtis-Taylor said that the rescission vote was the result of an online media campaign to discredit her. In newspaper reports Curtis-Taylor has denied making "false assertions about the nature of my flights" and has stated 'To suggest I have hoodwinked the public, deceived all my sponsors, the media, everyone, is just disgraceful'. Two resolutions were offered at the 2018 annual general meeting to review this decision, but both were turned down; in reply, Curtis-Taylor announced termination of her LAA membership.

== See also ==
- Women of Aviation Worldwide Week
