= Igor I. Sikorsky Human Powered Helicopter Competition =

Aerospace engineering award

Atlas
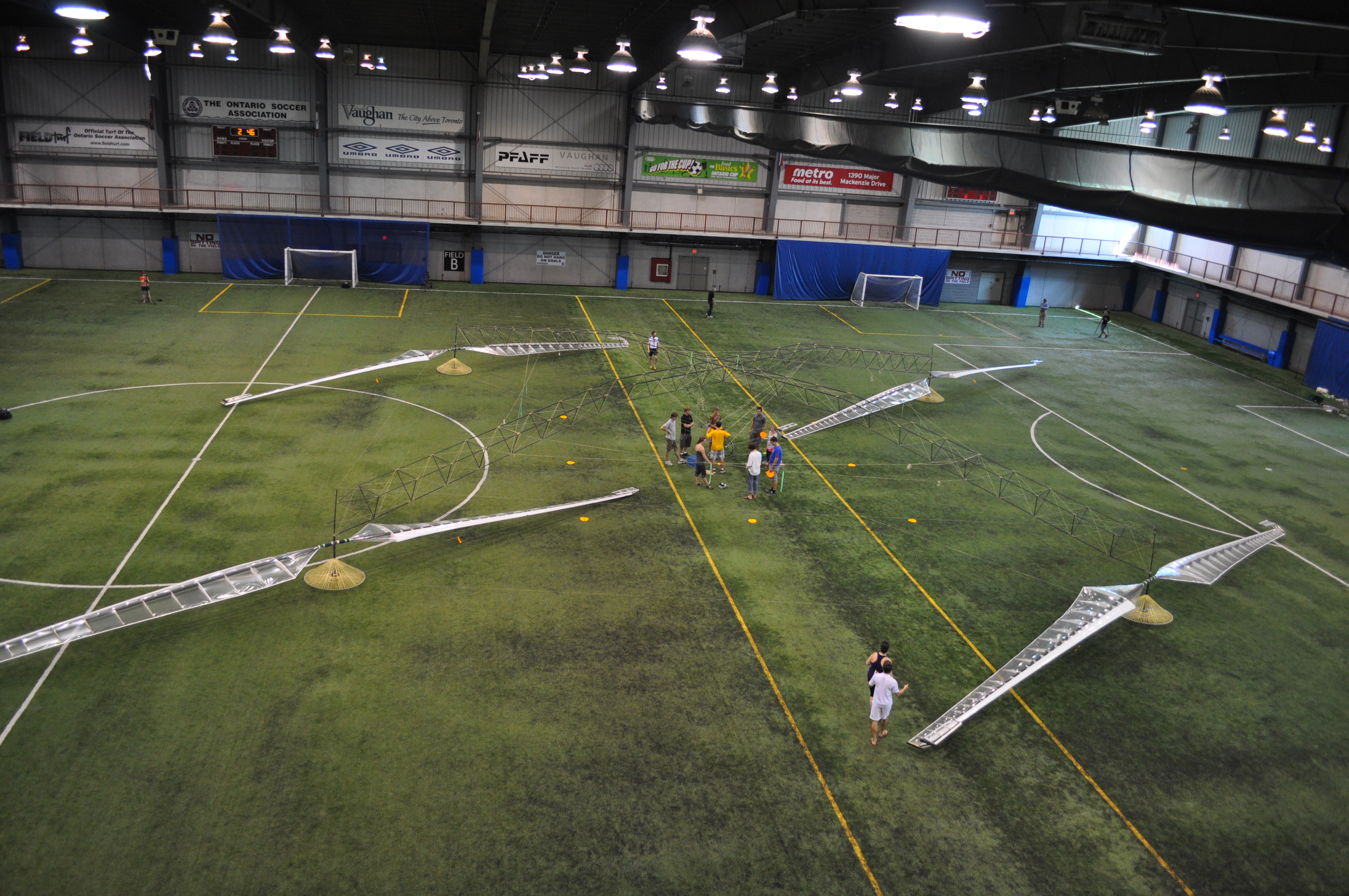
- Aerial view taken soon after the first flight of AeroVelo's Atlas human-powered helicopter

General information
- Type: Human-powered helicopter
- National origin: Canada
- Manufacturer: AeroVelo
- Designer: Todd Reichert and Cameron Robertson
- Number built: 1

History
- First flight: August 28, 2012

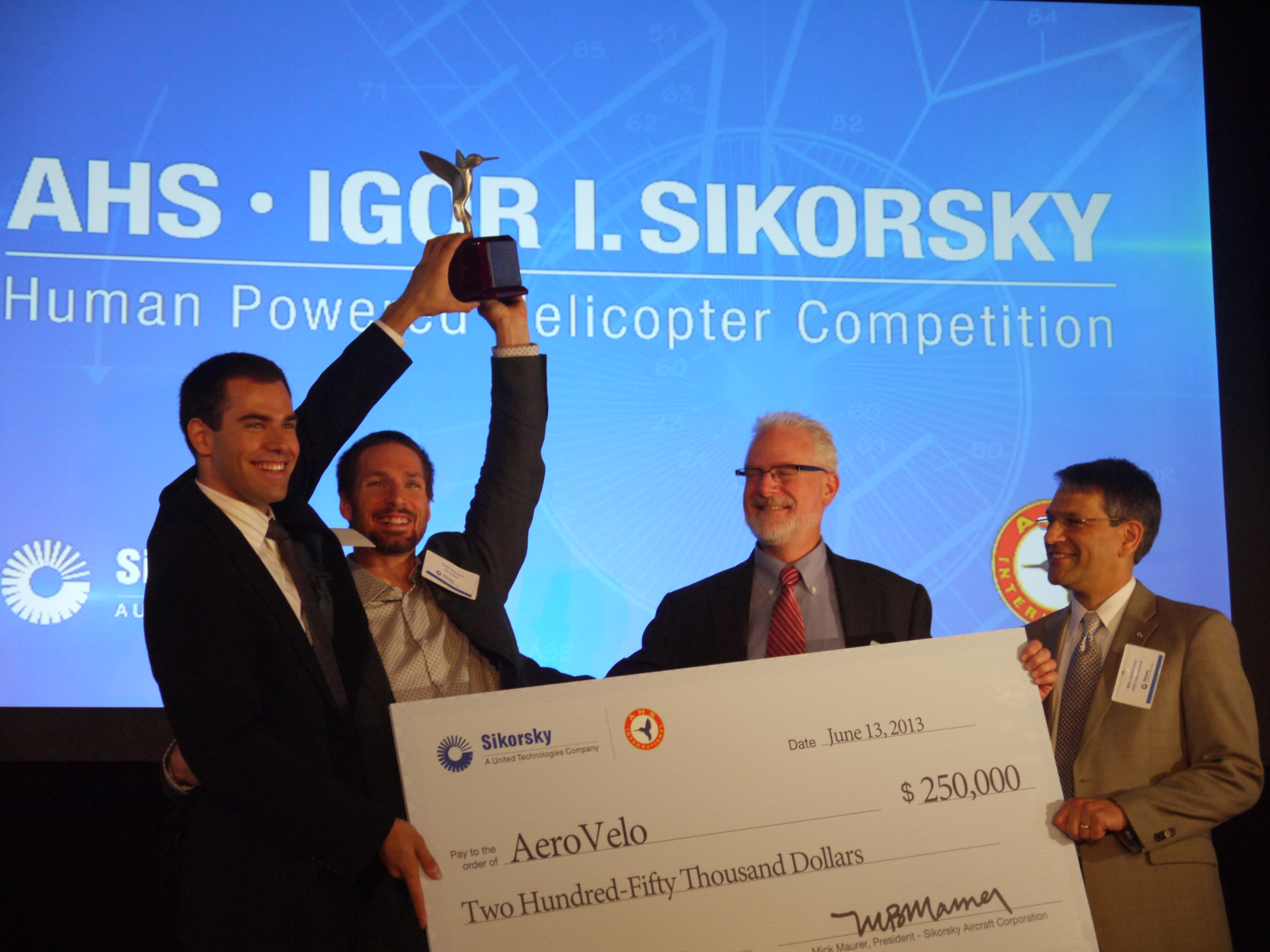
AHS International announced AeroVelo as the winner of its Igor I. Sikorsky Human Powered Helicopter Competition on July 11, 2013. Left to right: Cameron Robertson and Todd Reichert, AeroVelo; Mark Miller, Sikorsky Aircraft Corp; Mike Hirschberg, AHS International.

The Igor I. Sikorsky Human Powered Helicopter Competition was established in 1980 by the American Helicopter Society (AHS) International. The award, the AHS Sikorsky Prize, was given for the first human powered helicopter (HPH) to meet a set of extremely challenging flight requirements. In summary, the requirements to win the AHS Sikorsky Prize included a flight duration of 60 seconds and reaching an altitude of 3 meters (9.8 feet), with the center point of the aircraft hovering over a 10-by-10-metre (33 by 33 ft) square.

In 2013, 33 years after the competition was established, the award was officially declared won when AeroVelo's Atlas human-powered helicopter conducted a flight that met all the requirements of the AHS International competition, and received the $250,000 prize.

In the history of the prize, dozens of teams have designed and built human-powered helicopters, although few have made it airborne.

== History ==
The AHS competition was named in honor of Igor Sikorsky, one of the founders of the helicopter industry. AHS initiated the prize purse at $25,000, but later raised it to $250,000.

The first HPH to get off the ground was the Da Vinci III in 1989, designed and built by students at Cal Poly San Luis Obispo in California, USA. It flew for 7.1 seconds and reached a height of 8 inches (20 cm). The second was the Yuri I in 1994, designed and built by students at Nihon University in Japan. It flew for 19.46 seconds and reached an altitude of 20 cm.

With no human-powered helicopter getting off the ground since 1994, in 2009 Sikorsky Aircraft Corporation pledged to AHS International an increase in the size of the remuneration to $250,000, which significantly increased interest in the competition. It resulted in a new generation of human-powered helicopter teams, with two—one the University of Maryland and the other AeroVelo—in a "tight battle" to win.

Students at the University of Maryland designed and built the Gamera I. The Gamera I successfully flew on May 12, 2011 for approximately four seconds, soon followed by a flight of 11 seconds. In November 2011 construction began on the improved Gamera II. On June 21, 2012, the Gamera II flew for a duration of 50 seconds. Additional tests of Gamera IIXR with a larger cruciform and longer rotors on August 28, 2012 yielded official world records of 65 seconds endurance on one flight and 8 ft altitude on another – the first "high altitude" flight of a human-powered helicopter in history, and the first of the individual requirements to fall.

On June 24, 2012, the NTS Works Upturn human-powered helicopter also successfully flew for 10 seconds, climbing to about 2 ft (0.61 m). NTS Works later donated the aircraft to the California Polytechnic State University which is developing it as the Upturn II.

== Winner ==
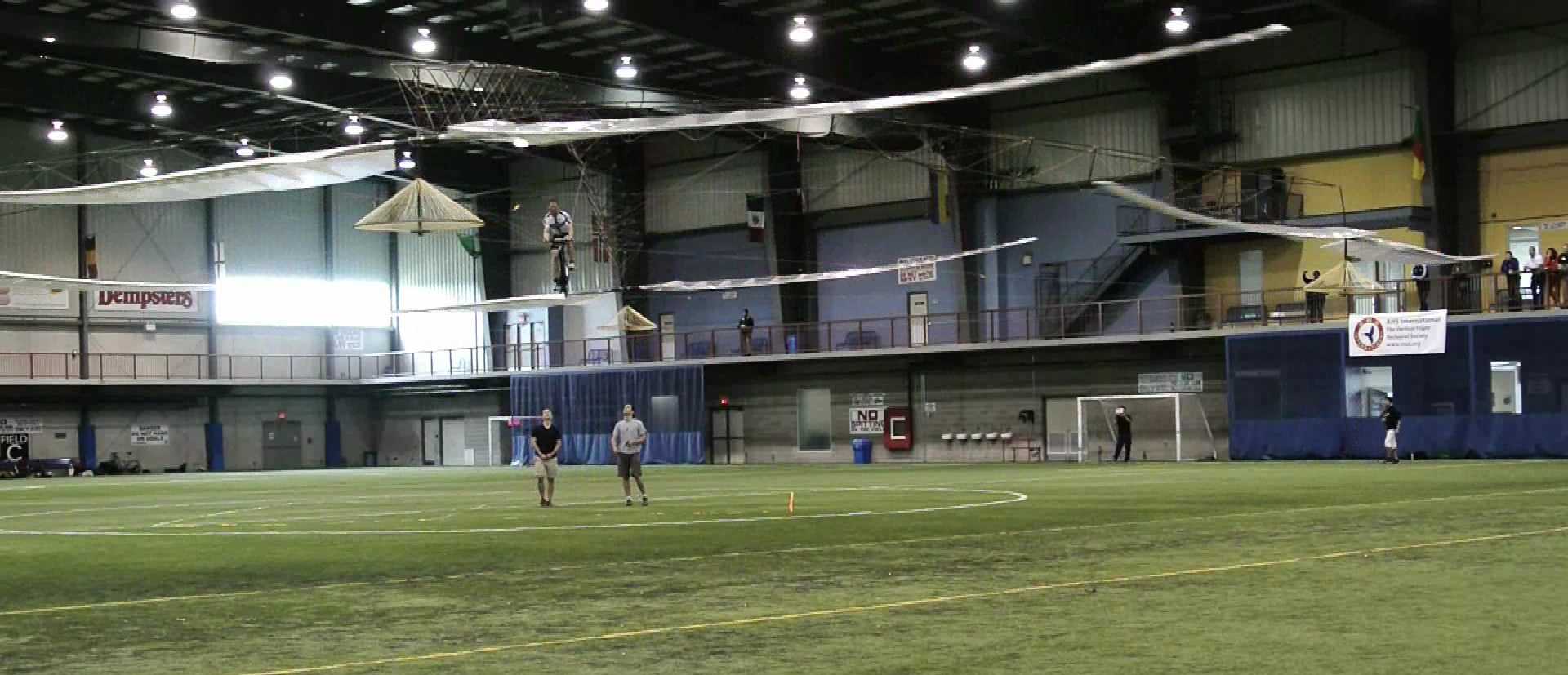
AHS Sikorsky Prize-winning flight of AeroVelo's "Atlas" human-powered helicopter

AeroVelo, comprising students and graduates of the University of Toronto, began flight testing its larger Atlas quad rotor HPH on August 28, 2012.

On 13 June 2013 AeroVelo kept its Atlas HPH airborne for 64.11 seconds, reaching 3.3 meters in altitude and drifting less than 9.8 meters. AHS International awarded AeroVelo the prize July 11, after its Helicopter Competition Committee reviewed the flight data.

== See also ==
- List of aviation awards
- List of engineering awards
- Kremer prize
- Prizes named after people
