= AeroVelo Atlas =

Human-powered helicopter

Atlas
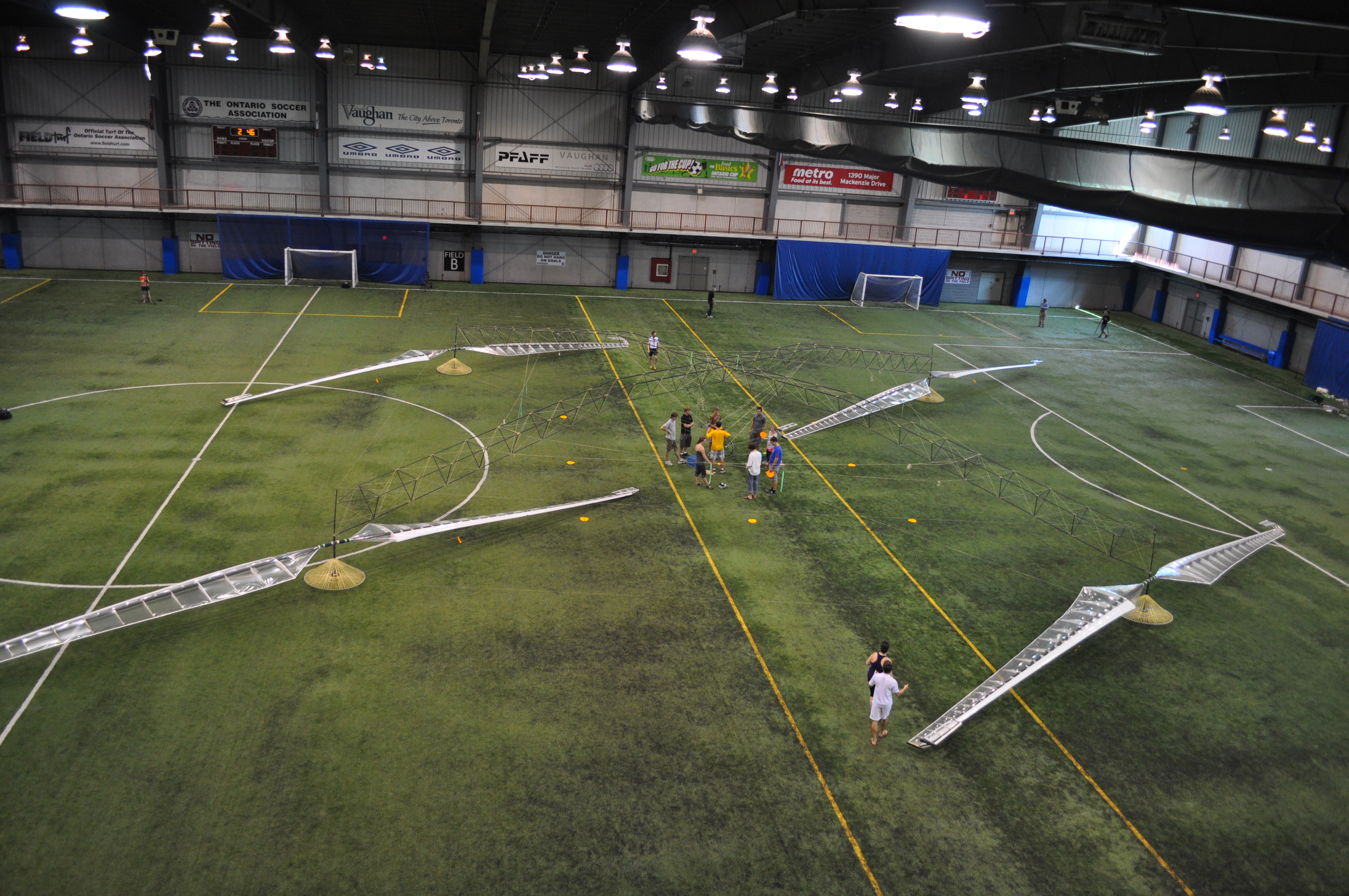
- Aerial view taken soon after the first flight of AeroVelo's Atlas human-powered helicopter

General information
- Type: Human-powered helicopter
- National origin: Canada
- Manufacturer: AeroVelo
- Number built: 1

History
- First flight: 28 August 2012

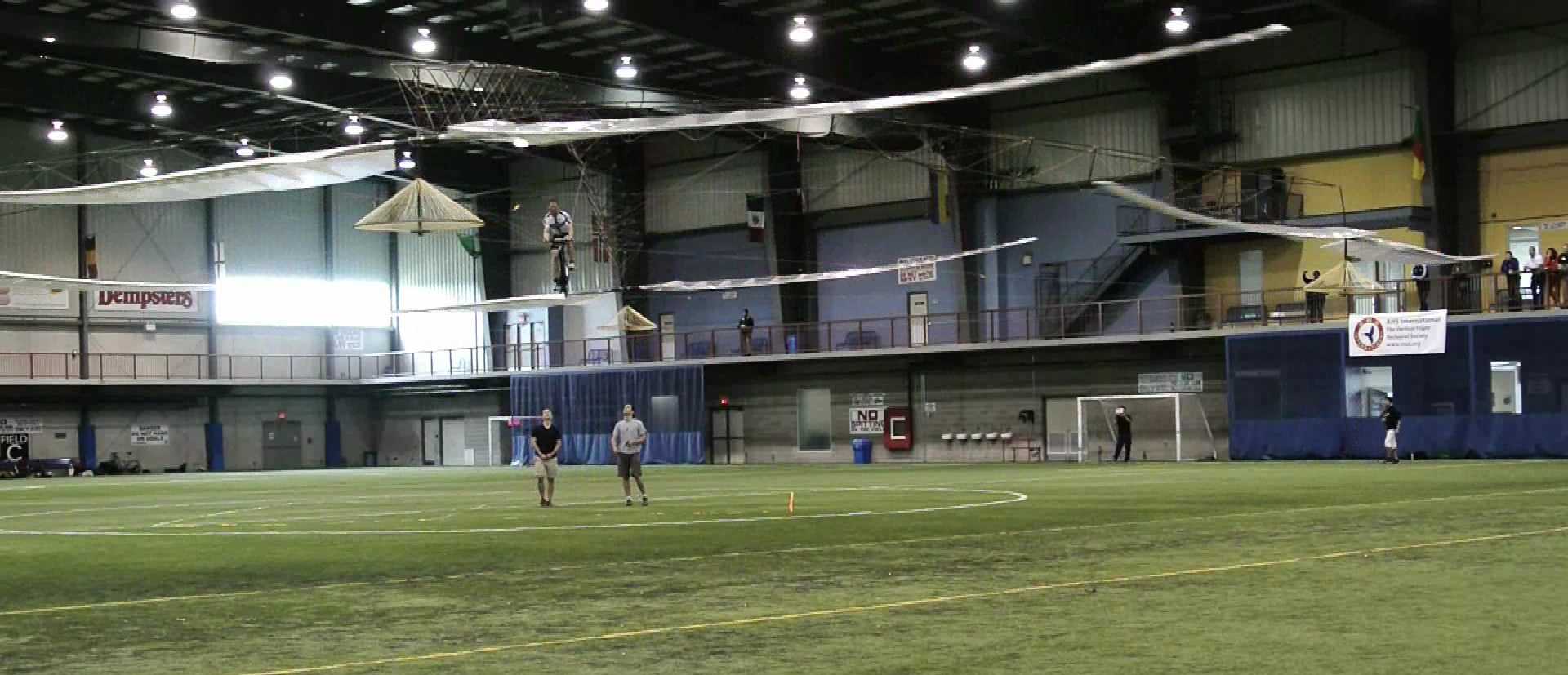
AHS Sikorsky Prize-winning flight of AeroVelo's Atlas human-powered helicopter

The AeroVelo Atlas is a human-powered helicopter (HPH) that was built for AHS International's Igor I. Sikorsky Human Powered Helicopter Competition. On 13 June 2013, it became the first aircraft to achieve the goals of the competition and thus won the prize.

== Design and development ==
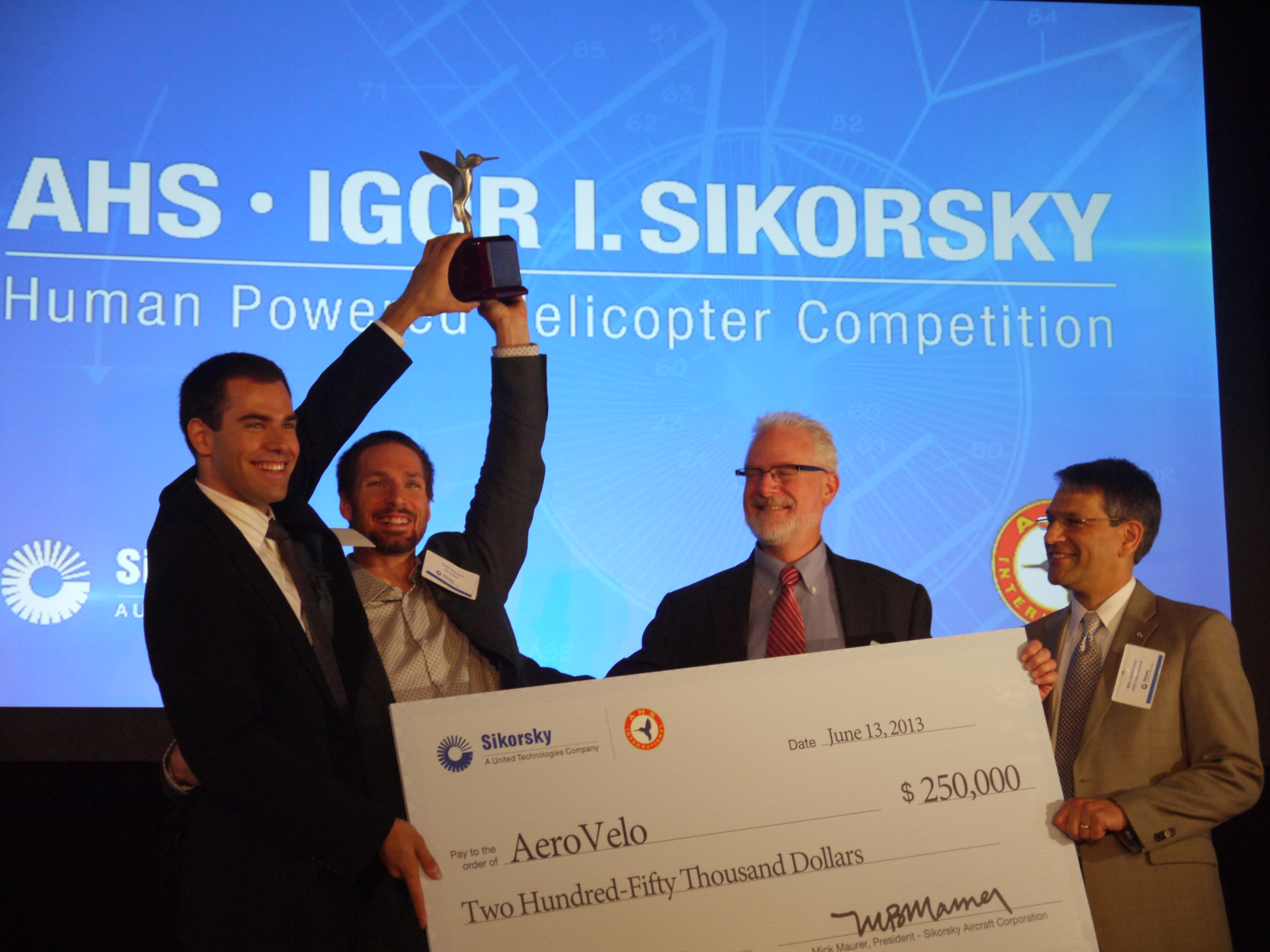
AHS International announced AeroVelo as the winner of its Igor I. Sikorsky Human Powered Helicopter Competition on 11 July 2013. Left to right: Cameron Robertson and Todd Reichert, AeroVelo; Mark Miller, Sikorsky Aircraft Corp; Mike Hirschberg, AHS International.

AeroVelo, a team of students and graduates of the University of Toronto, began flight testing its Atlas quad rotor HPH on 28 August 2012. The core team of AeroVelo is the same group that created Snowbird, the first successful human-powered ornithopter. The Atlas is the largest HPH ever flown, and has a tip-to-tip rotor span of 154 ft (47 m), second only to the Russian Mil V-12.

The peak power of 1.1 kW (1.5 hp) was generated only during the first few seconds to climb to the required 3-metre (9.8 ft) altitude. By the end of the flight, power had reduced to 600 W (0.80 hp). Todd Reichert, the pilot and a racing cyclist, had specifically trained for such a power profile. The design specifically took advantage of the ground effect possible by the altitude required to win the prize.

Control was created by leaning the bike, which flexed the entire helicopter frame, tilting the rotor axles.

== Operational history ==
The AeroVelo Atlas HPH made its first flight on 28 August 2012. On 13 June 2013, with a flight commencing at 12:43PM EDT, the team managed to keep Atlas in the air for 64.11 seconds, reach a peak altitude of 3.3 m (11 ft) and drift no more than 9.8 m (32 ft) from the starting point.

Data from that flight was submitted to AHS International. After this was reviewed by its panel of vertical flight technical experts, AHS International announced that the flight had met the requirements of the competition and that AeroVelo had officially won the $250,000 prize on 11 July 2013.

A section was donated to the New England Air Museum in 2017.

== Specifications ==
Data from Aviation Week and Space Technology 15 July 2013

General characteristics

- Crew: 1
- Empty weight: 55 kg (122 lb)
- Gross weight: 128 kg (282 lb)
- Powerplant: 1 × human , 1.1 kW (1.5 hp)
- Main rotor diameter: 4 × 20.2 m (66 ft 2 in)
- Main rotor area: 1,282 m^{2} (13,768 sq ft)

Performance

- Service ceiling: 3.3 m (11 ft)

== Aircraft on display ==
- Alpha and Gamma sections are on display at the American Helicopter Museum & Education Center in West Chester, PA

== See also ==
- University of Maryland Gamera II human-powered helicopter
