= Human-powered helicopter =

Helicopter powered solely by human activity

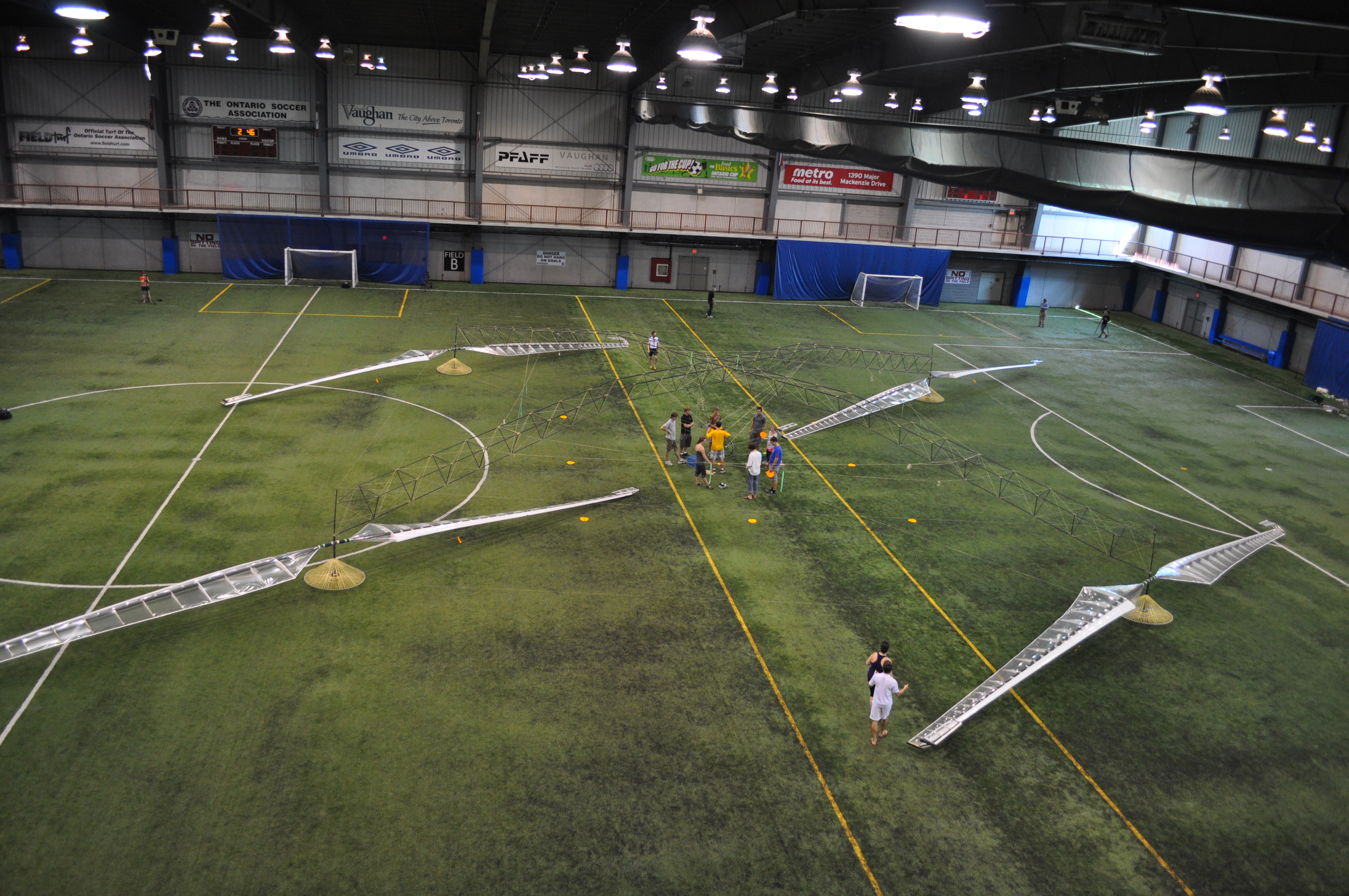
AeroVelo's Atlas human-powered helicopter shortly after its first flight

A human-powered helicopter (HPH) is a helicopter powered solely by one or more humans carried on board. As in other human-powered aircraft, the power is usually generated by pedalling. It remains a considerable engineering challenge to obtain both the power-to-weight ratio and rotor efficiency required to sustain a helicopter in flight.

On 13 June 2013, the AeroVelo Atlas was the first to complete a flight that lasted 64 seconds and reached an altitude of 3.3 meters or 10.82 feet, thus winning the American Helicopter Society (AHS) International's Igor I. Sikorsky Human Powered Helicopter Competition.

== The AHS Sikorsky Prize ==
The American Helicopter Society (AHS) International's Igor I. Sikorsky Human Powered Helicopter Competition was a competition to achieve the first human-powered helicopter flight to reach an altitude of 3 m (10 ft) during a flight lasting at least 60 seconds, while remaining within a 10 m (32.8 ft) x 10 m (32.8 ft) square, and complying with other competition requirements. Founded in 1980, the prize was originally $25,000, but was raised to $250,000 in 2009. After the increase, two teams – AeroVelo from Canada and Team Gamera from Maryland – raced to win the competition. It was won by the AeroVelo Atlas for a flight that took place on 13 June 2013.

In a ceremony on 11 July 2013, held at the Ontario Soccer Centre in Vaughan, Ontario, the prize of $250,000 was presented. In announcing the award, the executive director of AHS International stated, "We at AHS International congratulate the AeroVelo team on your incredible accomplishment. Like the Wright Brothers, Charles Lindbergh and Igor Sikorsky before you, you have set an aviation milestone that should be forever remembered as a truly remarkable feat of innovative engineering excellence."

== Projects ==
=== Da Vinci III ===
On 10 December 1989, the California Polytechnic State University Da Vinci III flew for 7.1 seconds and reached a height of 20 cm. The Da Vinci III is considered the first recorded human-powered helicopter flight.

=== Yuri I ===
The world record for human-powered helicopters was held by a craft named Yuri I, built by a team from the Nihon Aero Student Group. In 1994, it achieved a height of 20 cm for 19.46 seconds unassisted, and unofficially reached 70 cm during a flight lasting 24 seconds. In Japanese, the name Yuri means "lily", a reference to the shape of the machine.

=== Gamera ===
The University of Maryland sets an unofficial world altitude record for a human-powered helicopter of approximately 8 ft (2.4 m).

Team Gamera was formed at the University of Maryland in 2008 to explore the possibility of a human-powered helicopter that could fulfill the AHS Sikorsky Prize requirements. The team consisted of graduate and undergraduate engineering students, with most original team members affiliated with the Alfred Gessow Rotorcraft Center at UMD.

On 12 May 2011, the team's first human powered helicopter, Gamera I, was flown by pilot Judy Wexler for 4.2 seconds at a height of a few inches. On July 13, 2011, Judy Wexler piloted a slightly modified version of the same aircraft for a U.S. record of 11.4 seconds, but still short of the 1994 Yuri world record.

In 2011, Team Gamera designed a new aircraft, Gamera II, with a goal of meeting the 60-second flight duration requirement of the AHS Sikorsky Prize. Pilot Kyle Gluesenkamp set a new certified world record with a flight duration of 49.9 seconds on June 21, 2012 with Gamera II.

Subsequent modifications and improvements to Gamera II resulting in Gamera II XR, which made official record attempt flights in August 2012. On August 28, 2012, pilot Colin Gore hovered Gamera II XR for 65.1 seconds at less than 1 ft off the ground, setting a new world record for duration, and achieving the team's goal for Gamera II. On the same day, pilot Henry Enerson achieved an altitude of 8 ft (2.4 m) above ground level, which was the first time altitudes approaching the 3-meter (9.8 ft) prize requirement were achieved.

In late June 2013 (after Aerovelo's Atlas fulfilled the AHS Sikorsky Prize requirements), Team Gamera achieved a 60-second, 9.4 ft (2.9 m) altitude flight with pilot Henry Enerson, but required team members to restrain vehicle drifting. Henry Enerson the same day achieved a 10.8 ft (3.3 m) flight that lasted 48 seconds (restrained), which remains as the maximum altitude achieved by the team. An unofficial world record flight duration of 74 seconds was also achieved the same day by pilot Brandon Draper.

On September 25, 2013, pilot Justin Mauch powered Gamera IID (another upgraded version of Gamera II) for a certified U.S. record and pending world record flight duration of 97.5 seconds. On the same day, pilot Kay Tsui set a new U.S. record for a flight duration of 38 seconds.

=== Upturn ===
On 24 June 2012, the NTS Works Upturn human-powered helicopter also flew successfully for 10 seconds, climbing to about 2 ft (0.6 m). In October 2012, NTS Works donated the Upturn to California Polytechnic University of San Luis Obispo.

=== Atlas ===
AeroVelo is an aeronautical engineering start-up founded by University of Toronto graduates Todd Reichert and Cameron Robertson. The project received its initial funding via Kickstarter. Work on the group's Atlas helicopter began in January 2012. Flight tests began in August. On 28 August 2012, Atlas became the fifth human-powered helicopter to fly. The group experienced two major crashes over the subsequent months as they refined their design.

The Atlas, a quad-rotor design, has a 50x50 meter square frame with a bicycle at the center to provide the power to four 20 metres (66 ft) slow-moving rotors at each corner of the frame. Overall, the helicopter is 58 metres (190 ft) wide. Despite its large size, the entire helicopter weighs just 55 kilograms (121 lb). Unlike the Gamera design, power is achieved solely from leg power; it is flown by one person.

On 13 June 2013, the Atlas completed a flight that fulfilled the requirements of the Sikorsky Human Powered Helicopter Challenge. The flight was powered by Reichert at an indoor soccer stadium in Vaughan near Toronto, lasted 64 seconds and reached a maximum altitude of 3.3 meters. The prize-winning flight came on the last day of five days of testing, and just minutes before the group was scheduled to vacate the premises. After a Fédération Aéronautique Internationale panel verified the feat, the $250,000 prize was awarded on 11 July 2013. Presenting the prize, American Helicopter Society director Mike Hirschberg remarked "Several studies 'proved' that [the challenge] was in fact scientifically impossible ... Well, it took a third of a century to prove those skeptics wrong." Reichert said the most difficult part of the flight was not the ascent, but rather controlling the descent without crashing. He said the prize money was nice, but the real satisfaction came from the achievement itself. Subsequent to that prize-winning flight, the Atlas flew many more times, including record setting flights in September 2013 for:

- Longest hover flight by a woman: Alexis Reichert, 55 seconds
- Longest hover flight by a man: Trefor Evans, 87 seconds
- Youngest HPH flight: Dafydd Evans, age 15, unknown duration
- Oldest HPH flight: Marc Poland, age 55, 65 seconds
