= Vertical Flight Society =

Aviation society

The Vertical Flight Society
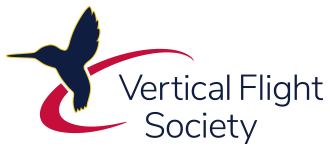
- Founded: June 25, 1943
- Type: Educational and Scientific Non-Profit
- Purpose: Vertical flight technology
- Location: Fairfax, Virginia, U.S.
- Members: 6,000
- Key people: Angelo Collins, Executive Director
- Website: www.vtol.org

The Vertical Flight Society, formerly the American Helicopter Society (AHS), is the non-profit technical society for the advancement of vertical flight. It has 21 different technical committees and two dozen active chapters around the world. There are over 100 corporate members and 28 educational members.

Each year, the Society organizes or co-sponsors several regional and international conferences that facilitate the advancement of the theory and practices of helicopter and other VTOL aircraft technology, and publishes their proceedings. Its AHS Forum is the largest vertical flight technical conference in the world, with over 1200 attendees.

Formed in 1943 as the American Helicopter Society, it publishes a general audience vertical flight technology magazine, Vertiflite, as well as one of the only technical publication devoted solely to vertical flight, The Journal of the American Helicopter Society (JAHS), published quarterly. The society advocates on behalf of rotorcraft technology to the public and to government bodies. The Vertical Flight Society also awards nearly $100,000 or more in annual scholarships and sponsors an annual student design competition for university undergraduate and graduate student teams.

The Society was renamed to VFS in April 2018 to better reflect its mission: even though the Society was founded with the word "American" in its name, the membership was international; and the focus is all vertical flight aircraft, including non-helicopter rotorcraft (such as the V-22 Osprey), jet-borne V/STOL (such as the AV-8 Harrier and F-35 Lightning II), electric VTOL, and other non-conventional configurations.

== See also ==
- Igor I. Sikorsky Human Powered Helicopter Competition
