= 2012 in aviation =

This is a list of aviation-related events in 2012.

== January ==
7 January

- A hot air balloon on a scenic flight disintegrates and crashes just north of Carterton, New Zealand, killing all 11 people on board. It is the second-deadliest balloon accident in history, the deadliest aviation accident in mainland New Zealand since July 1963, and the deadliest accident involving a New Zealand aircraft since November 1979.

9 January

- The European Union declares the financial aid Malév Hungarian Airlines receives from the Government of Hungary to be illegal. The European Commission soon orders the airline to pay back all of the subsidies it received from the Hungarian government between 2007 and 2010, a total of 38 billion forints (€130 million; $171 million), an amount equal to its entire 2010 revenue.

14 January

- After the completion of a seven-year restoration project, the only flyable Lockheed Super Constellation at the time, a retired 57-year-old ex-United States Air Force EC-121 Warning Star airborne early warning radar surveillance aircraft, makes a 90-minute flight from Camarillo, California, to Chino, California, to go on display at the Yanks Air Museum in Chino.

20 January

- Cirrus Airlines ceases flight operations.

27 January

- Spanair ceases operations.

== February ==
3 February

- After creditors seize two of its airliners at foreign airports and with total debts of 60 billion forints (US$270.5 million), Malév Hungarian Airlines ceases flight operations after 66 years in business.

4 February

- Australian filmmaker Andrew Wight is at the controls of his private Robinson R44 helicopter with American filmmaker Mike deGruy as a passenger for a flight to scout filming locations when the helicopter crashes on takeoff and burns at Jaspers Brush near Berry in New South Wales, Australia. Both men are killed.

5 February

- MatlinPatterson, the private equity firm in control of World Airways and North American Airlines, takes its Global Aviation Holdings subsidiary carriers into Chapter 11 bankruptcy reorganization less than four years after shuttering fellow subsidiary carriers ATA Airlines and Arrow Air.

7 February

- AirQuarius Aviation ceases operations.

12 February

- A Katanga Express Gulfstream IV crashes while landing at Kavumu Airport at Bukavu, Democratic Republic of the Congo, killing four of the seven people on board and two people on the ground and prompting the Congolese government to suspend Katanga Express's license.

14 February

- The Metropolitan Court of Budapest in Hungary declares MALÉV Ltd., the parent company of Malév Hungarian Airlines, insolvent. The airline's assets will be liquidated.

== March ==
- AirAsia Philippines begins flight operations, using a fleet of two new Airbus A320-200 aircraft.
- All air traffic in Bucharest, Romania, except for business air traffic is transferred from Bucharest's low-cost hub, Aurel Vlaicu International Airport, to Bucharest Henri Coandă International Airport.

2 March

- The last departure of an official Continental Airlines flight takes place at 11:59 pm Pacific Standard Time as Continental Flight 1267 departs Phoenix, Arizona, bound for Cleveland, Ohio. On 3 March, Continental Airlines disappears into United Airlines, completing the two airlines' 2010 merger. Continental had operated since 1934.

3 March

- The Continental Connection and Continental Express airline brands disappear as all Continental Connection and Continental Express operations become a part of United Express.

6 March

- Turkish Airlines begins twice-a-week service from Istanbul, Turkey, via Khartoum, Sudan, to Mogadishu, Somalia, becoming the first major airline from outside East Africa to offer passenger service to Mogadishu in over 20 years. Deputy Prime Minister of Turkey Bekir Bozdağ is aboard the first flight.

15 March

- A Royal Norwegian Air Force C-130J Super Hercules crashes into Mount Kebnekaise, killing all five people on board and triggering an avalanche.

21 March

- The Government of Ukraine establishes the National Bureau of Air Accidents Investigation of Ukraine.

27 March

- Aboard JetBlue Airways Flight 191, an Airbus A320-200 flying from John F. Kennedy International Airport in New York, New York, to McCarran International Airport in Las Vegas, Nevada, the copilot locks Captain Clayton Osbon out of the cockpit after Osbon begins acting erratically, apparently suffering from a panic attack. Staff and passengers subdue Osbon. An off-duty Jet Blue pilot helps the co pilot make a diversion to Amarillo, Texas, where Osbon is arrested.

== April ==
2 April

- UTair Flight 120, a twin-engine UTair Aviation ATR-72-201, crashes in western Siberia near the city of Tyumen shortly after takeoff from Roschino International Airport, killing 33 of the 43 people on board and critically injuring all 10 survivors.

17 April

- A Shuttle Carrier Aircraft, accompanied by a National Aeronautics and Space Administration (NASA) T-38 Talon chase plane, carries the retired Space Shuttle Discovery from the Kennedy Space Center at Cape Canaveral, Florida, to Washington Dulles International Airport in Dulles, Virginia, where Discovery is slated to replace the Space Shuttle Enterprise on display at the Smithsonian Institution's nearby Steven F. Udvar-Hazy Center, a part of the National Air and Space Museum. The delivery flight includes low-level passes over the Cape Canaveral area as well as flybys at an altitude of 1,500 feet (460 meters) over Washington, D.C.-area landmarks.

19 April

- Slovenian pilot Matevž Lenarčič returns to Slovenia, completing a 62,000-mile (99,839-km) round-the-world flight in a Pipistrel Virus SW914 ultralight aircraft, claiming to be the first person to circle the world in an ultralight without a copilot. The flight, sponsored as the "GreenLight World Flight," had begun from Slovenia on 8 January 2012 and had included passing Mount Everest at an altitude of 29,344 feet (8,944 meters), some 300 feet (91 meters) above the mountain's peak.

20 April

- Bhoja Air Flight 213, a Boeing 737-236, crashes in bad weather on approach to Benazir Bhutto International Airport at Islamabad, Pakistan, killing all 127 people on board.
- Over La Guajira, Colombia, Colombian skydiver Jhonathan Florez sets four world skydiving records in single jump, setting the records for longest wingsuit flight in terms of duration at 9 minutes 6 seconds, highest-altitude wingsuit jump at 37,265 feet (11,358 meters), greatest horizontal distance flown in a wingsuit at 16.315 statute miles (26.272 km), and greatest absolute distance traveled while in freefall at 17.52 statute miles (28.21 km).

24 April

- The United States Air Force inactivates the Seventeenth Air Force.

27 April

- A Shuttle Carrier Aircraft, accompanied by a National Aeronautics and Space Administration (NASA) T-38 Talon chase plane, carries the Space Shuttle Enterprise from Washington Dulles International Airport in Dulles, Virginia, to John F. Kennedy International Airport in New York City, making low-level flybys of New York City-area and Long Island landmarks. Enterprise, replaced by the Space Shuttle Discovery at the Smithsonian Institution National Air and Space Museum's Steven F. Udvar-Hazy Center in Virginia, is to be placed on display at the Intrepid Sea, Air & Space Museum in New York.
- A team of scientists and engineers stages an experimental crash of the Boeing 727-200 XB-MNP in a desert near Mexicali, Mexico. The crash is filmed for a television documentary. It is only the second such experiment in history, the only previous one having been the 1984 Controlled Impact Demonstration.

== May ==
9 May

- A Sukhoi Superjet 100 airliner crashes on Mount Salak on Java in Indonesia during a demonstration flight for airline representatives and journalists, killing all 45 people on board. Its wreckage is discovered on 10 May.

10 May

- The women's international record-holder for number of flight hours logged as a pilot in a lifetime, Evelyn Bryan Johnson, dies at the age of 102. Between her first solo flight on 8 November 1944 and her retirement from flying in the mid-1990s, she had logged 57,635 hours (about 6 1/2 years) in the air, flying about 5,500,000 miles (8,900,000 km). Only one person, Ed Long (1915–1999), had logged more hours (over 65,000, or about 7 years) in the air during a lifetime.

14 May

- After aborting its landing at Jomsom Airport at Jomsom, Nepal, a Dornier 228 AG-CHT crashes when its wing strikes a hillside while attempting a go-around, killing 15 of the 21 people on board and injuring all six survivors. Indian child actress Taruni Sachdev is among the dead.

23 May

- Using a wingsuit in a jump over Ridge Wood, Buckinghamshire, England, British stuntman Gary Connery becomes the first person in history to jump from a great height and land safely without deploying a parachute. Jumping from an altitude of 2,400 feet (730 meters), he reduces his speed from 50 to 15 miles per hour (80 to 24 km/h) by flaring his wingsuit about 200 feet (61 meters) from his landing zone: a 350-by-45-foot (107-by-14-meter) crushable "runway" up to 12 feet (3.7 meters) deep constructed with 18,600 cardboard boxes at Temple Island Meadows. His wingsuit begins to fly about three seconds after he begins his jump, and he travels nearly one mile (1.6 km) and reaches a maximum speed of over 80 miles per hour (130 km/h) during his flight.

25 May

- The first Solar Impulse aircraft, HB-SIA, the first solar-powered aircraft capable of both day and night flight thanks to its batteries charged by solar power, completes the first leg of its first intercontinental flight, arriving at Madrid, Spain, after a flight from Payerne Airport outside Payerne, Switzerland. During the flight, it sets a world distance record for a solar-powered flight between pre-declared waypoints of 1,099.3 km (683.1 mi) and a world distance record for a solar-powered flight along a course of 1,116 km (693 mi). The second and final leg of the flight will take HB-SIA to Rabat, Morocco, the following month.

26 May

- Japanese wingsuit pilot Shin Ito achieves two new world wingsuit flight records, greatest horizontal distance flown in a wingsuit by flying 26.9 kilometers (16.7 miles) and greatest absolute distance flown in a wingsuit by flying 28.707 kilometers (17.838 miles). Both flights take place above Yolo County, California.

== June ==
2 June

- Allied Air Flight 111, a Boeing 727 cargo plane, overruns the runway on landing at Kotoka International Airport in Accra, Ghana, and strikes a crowded minibus and a bicyclist on a nearby road. All four people on the plane survive, but the bicyclist and all 11 people on the minibus die.

3 June

- On approach to a landing at Lagos, Nigeria, the crew of Dana Air Flight 992, a McDonnell Douglas MD-83, reports engine trouble and declares an emergency. Shortly thereafter, the aircraft crashes into a furniture works and printing press building in the Iju-Ishaga neighborhood of Lagos, killing all 153 people aboard and 6 people on the ground. Additional people on the ground are injured. It is the second-deadliest plane crash in Nigerian history and the deadliest ever involving an MD-83.

5 June

- The first Solar Impulse aircraft, HB-SIA, the first solar-powered aircraft capable of both day and night flight thanks to its batteries charged by solar power, completes its first intercontinental flight, arriving at Rabat, Morocco, after a 19-hour flight across the Strait of Gibraltar from Madrid, Spain. The flight is the second and final leg of its intercontinental trip, which had begun on 25 May with a flight from its home base at Payerne Airport outside Payerne, Switzerland, to Madrid.

10 June

- A Kenya Police Eurocopter AS350 Écureuil crashes on a hill in the Kibiku area of the Ngong Forest just outside Nairobi, Kenya, killing all six people on board. Among the fatalities are Kenya's Minister of Interior Security and likely presidential candidate George Saitoti and Assistant Minister of Interior Security Joshua Orwa Ojode.

21 June

- An Indonesian Air Force Fokker 27 on a training flight crashes into a housing complex while on approach to a landing at Jakarta, Indonesia. Six of the seven people on the plane die immediately, and the seventh dies later of his injuries. On the ground, four people die and 11 are injured.

28 June

- The U.S. military announces that wreckage revealed by a retreating glacier in Alaska and discovered during June 2012 is that of a U.S. Air Force C-124A Globemaster II which crashed into Mount Gannett on 22 November 1952, killing all 52 people on board. Originally identified on 28 November 1952, the wreckage had become buried in ice and snow and had been lost for nearly 60 years.

29 June

- Six Uyghur men armed with aluminum crutches and explosives attempt to hijack Tianjin Airlines Flight 7554, an Embraer ERJ-190 on a flight from Hotan to Ürümqi, China, with 95 other people aboard. The crew and other passengers resist them and foil the hijacking attempt. Two hijackers are killed and 13 people (two hijackers, two security officers, two flight attendants, and seven passengers) are injured, and the plane returns safely to Hotan.

== July ==
1 July

- Lauda Air, a wholly owned subsidiary of Austrian Airlines since December 2000, officially merges into Austrian Airlines, with all Lauda Air aircraft transferred to Austrian Airlines on the same date. However, Austrian Airlines will continue to operate some of its flights under the "Lauda Air" brand until 31 March 2013.

4 July

- Two Swedish advertising agency employees, Thomas Mazetti and Hannah Frey, take off from Pociūnai Airport in Lithuania, make an illegal 90-minute flight into Belarus at an altitude of 50 metres (160 feet) in a Jodel biplane, and drop 879 parachute-equipped teddy bears adorned with human rights and freedom-of-speech slogans into the southern suburbs of Minsk.

5 July

- Facing mounting financial difficulties and with its employees having gone on strike two days earlier, the Uruguayan airline PLUNA ceases operations. Its owner, the Government of Uruguay, announces plans to auction off PLUNA's aircraft and routes.

13 July

- The United States Air Force inactivates the Nineteenth Air Force. It will remain inactive until October 2014.

26 July

- Indonesia AirAsia announces a plan to buy out Batavia Air by 2013 in a two-stage process. The deal will be cancelled in October.

== August ==
1 August

- The first incarnation of AirAsia Japan, a joint venture of Malaysian airline AirAsia and Japanese airline All Nippon Airways makes its first flight, flying between Tokyo's Narita International Airport and Fukuoka. This version of AirAsia Japan will operate until October 2013.

12 August

- The airline Wind Jet ceases operations after Alitalia's attempt to purchase it fails, leaving hundred of passengers stranded in Italy.

18 August

- Suffering engine trouble, an Aviatour Air Piper PA-34-200 Seneca I crashes in the sea off Masbate in the Philippines, killing three of the four people on board and injuring the lone survivor. Among the dead is Philippine Secretary of the Interior Jesse Robredo, whose body will be recovered from the sea on 21 August.

19 August

- An Alfa Airlines Antonov An-26-100 carrying a Sudanese government delegation to an Eid al-Fitr festival crashes in the mountains around Talodi in the state of South Kordofan in southern Sudan, killing all 32 people on board. Among the dead are Sudan's Minister of Religious Affairs Ghazi al-Sadiq, Minister for Youth and Sports Mahjoub Abdel Raheem Toutou, and Minister for Tourism, Antiquities, and Wildlife Eissa Daifallah, several members of the Sudanese Armed Forces and state security service, and a state media television crew.

23 August

- Caught in a sudden thunderstorm, a hot-air balloon carrying tourists on a sightseeing trip attempts an emergency landing in Slovenia's Ljubljana Marsh, but strikes trees, crashes, and catches fire. 6 of the 32 people on board are killed and the remainder are injured.

25 August

- Neil Armstrong – American astronaut, aerospace engineer, test pilot, and university professor, U.S. Navy pilot, and the first person to walk on the Moon – dies in Cincinnati, Ohio, at the age of 82.

26 August

- After a final flight from Denver, Colorado, to Lihue, Kauaʻi, Hawaii, 83-year-old Ron Akana retires as the longest-serving flight attendant in history. His career, all with United Airlines, had spanned 63 years since he joined the airline in 1949, interrupted only by two years of military service from 1951 to 1953. He had flown about 200 million miles (322,000,000 km) and made about 10,000 trips over the Pacific Ocean.

28 August

- The University of Maryland's Gamera II sets a flight endurance record for a human-powered helicopter, remaining aloft for 65.1 seconds. During a flight later in the day, it sets an unofficial altitude record as well, reaching an altitude of 2.4 meters (7.9 feet).

== September ==
11 September

- The Malaysian low-cost airline Malindo Air is founded. It will begin flight operations in March 2013.

12 September

- Petropavlovsk-Kamchatsky Air Flight 251, an Antonov An-28, crashes while attempting to land at Palana Airport outside Palana, Russia, killing 10 of the 14 people on board and seriously injuring all four survivors.

21 September

- A Space Shuttle is airborne for the last time as a Shuttle Carrier Aircraft completes a three-day journey to transport the retired Space Shuttle Endeavour from Cape Canaveral, Florida, to Los Angeles, California. After two days of delays due to bad weather, the aircraft had departed Cape Canaveral on 19 September and made low passes over Florida's Space Coast and National Aeronautics and Space Administration (NASA) centers in Mississippi and Louisiana before spending the night at Ellington Field in Houston, Texas; proceeded on 20 September to El Paso, Texas, for a refueling stop before flying over the White Sands Test Facility in New Mexico and over Tucson, Arizona, in tribute to retired Congresswoman Gabby Giffords, ending the day with an overnight stop at Edwards Air Force Base in California; and on 21 September had completed the final leg of the journey by making low-level passes over Sacramento, San Francisco, Silicon Valley, and Los Angeles, California, before landing at Los Angeles International Airport.

28 September

- Sita Air Flight 601, a Dornier 228 carrying British, Chinese, and Nepalese trekkers to the Mount Everest region, strikes a bird shortly after takeoff from Tribhuvan International Airport in Kathmandu, Nepal, crashes on the bank of the Manohara River at Madhyapur Thimi 500 metres (550 yards) short of the runway while attempting to return to the airport, and burns. All 19 people on board die. It is the seventh fatal air crash in Nepal since August 2010.

== October ==
7 October

- FlyMontserrat Flight 107, the Britten-Norman Islander VP-NOM, crashes shortly after takeoff from V. C. Bird International Airport on Antigua, killing three of the four people on board and injuring the lone survivor. It is the deadliest air accident in the history of Antigua and Barbuda.

11 October

- Indonesia AirAsia announces the cancellation of its plan to buy out Batavia Air.

14 October

- In the Red Bull Stratos project, Austrian Felix Baumgartner balloon altitude record, ascending to 38,969 meters (127,851 feet) near Roswell, New Mexico. He then sets a new height record for a parachute jump, diving from a capsule suspended beneath the balloon at an altitude of 128,097 feet (39,044 meters; 24.26 miles; 39.04 km). The 9-minute descent includes a 4-minute-20-second free fall of 119,846 feet (36,530 meters; 22.7 miles; 36.5 km), during which he reaches Mach 1.24 (833.9 mph; 1,342.8 km/h), becoming the first person to exceed the speed of sound without travelling in a jet aircraft or spacecraft. He lands standing up. He breaks the skydiving altitude record set on 16 August 1960 by U.S. Air Force Colonel Joseph Kittinger, who serves as Baumgartner's capsule communicator during the jump.

15 October

- Towed through the streets of Los Angeles, California, the retired Space Shuttle Endeavour completes a 12-mile (19 km) journey from Los Angeles International Airport to the California Science Center for museum display. Endeavour had left the airport on 12 October, and numerous logistical problems along the route cause it to arrive at the science center 17 hours late.

20 October

- India's Kingfisher Airlines suspends flight operations due to financial difficulties.

== November ==
2 November

- The Space Shuttle Atlantis is towed from the Vehicle Assembly Building at the Kennedy Space Center in Cape Canaveral, Florida, to an exhibition hall at Cape Canaveral's main tourist stop to be put on display. The 10-mile (16-km) journey takes 12 hours. It is the final act of the Space Shuttle Program.

26 November

- The U.S. Navy begins testing of the Northrop Grumman X-47B unmanned combat aerial vehicle aboard the aircraft carrier USS Harry S. Truman (CVN-75). By the time the testing period ends on 18 December, the X-47B will have made a number of successful test launches and recoveries.

30 November

- An Aéro-Service (initially mistakenly attributed to Trans Air Congo) Ilyushin Il-76T (registration number EK-76300) on a domestic cargo flight in the Republic of the Congo from Pointe Noire to Brazzaville crashes short of Runway 5L in a residential area while attempting to land in bad weather at Maya-Maya Airport in Brazzaville. All six crew members – five of whom are from Armenia – and one police officer on board the aircraft and 26 people on the ground are killed, and 14 people on the ground are injured.

== December ==
9 December

- Ten minutes after takeoff, during a domestic flight in Mexico from Monterrey to Toluca, Learjet 25 N345MC, carrying Mexican-American singer and reality television star Jenni Rivera and six other people, loses contact with air traffic controllers, enters a rapid descent from 35,000 to 9,000 feet (10,700 to 2,700 m), and crashes in a remote, mountainous area in Nuevo León near Iturbide, killing everyone on board.

21 December

- The Republic of South Sudan's Sudan People's Liberation Army shoots down a United Nations helicopter on a reconnaissance flight as Nizhnevartovskavia Flight 544 over Jonglei in South Sudan, killing its entire four-man Russian crew. South Sudan at first denies shooting the helicopter down, then expresses regret for the incident, saying its forces had shot the helicopter down after mistaking it for a plane from Sudan flying supplies in to rebels in Jonglei.

25 December

- The crew of an Air Bagan Fokker 100 with 71 people on board for a domestic flight in Burma from Rangoon to Heho via Mandalay mistakes a road for the runway while descending to land at Heho in heavy fog, hits power lines, and crash-lands either on the road or in a nearby rice paddy and burns, killing a tour guide and injuring eleven other people aboard the plane. A man on the ground riding a bicycle also is killed.
- An Antonov An-72 military transport aircraft belonging to the military forces of Kazakhstan carrying a crew of seven and 20 members of the Kazakhstan Border Guard Service crashes in bad weather about 20 km (12 mi) from Shymkent while descending to a landing there after a domestic flight from Astana, killing everyone on board. The acting Director of the Kazakhstan Border Guard Service, Colonel Turganbeck Stambekov, is among the dead, along with one of his deputies and a number of regional Border Guard commanders.

29 December

- Red Wings Airlines Flight 9268, Tupolev Tu-204-100B RA-64047, arriving from Pardubice Airport at Pardubice in the Czech Republic at the end of a repositioning flight with a crew of eight and no passengers on board, overruns the runway on landing at Vnukovo International Airport in Moscow, Russia, crosses partly onto a highway, crashes into a ditch, breaks into three pieces, and catches fire, killing five crew members and critically injuring all three survivors.
- Aerosvit Airlines files for bankruptcy. It will cease operations in April 2013.

== First flights ==
=== March ===
- 9 March – Cessna Citation M2

=== April ===
- 3 April – Diamond DA52

=== May ===
- 10 May – AgustaWestland AW169 I-EASF

=== June ===
- 1 June – Boeing Phantom Eye

=== July ===
- e-volo VC2

=== September ===
- 21 September – Sukhoi Su-30SM

=== October ===
- 31 October – Shenyang J-31

=== November ===
- 27 November – Embraer Legacy 500 PT-ZEX

=== December ===
- 1 December – Dassault nEUROn

== Entered service ==
- 1 June – Boeing 747-8 Intercontinental with Lufthansa.

== Retirements ==
=== February ===
8 February

- Shuttle Carrier Aircraft N911A by the National Aeronautics and Space Administration (NASA); the aircraft was retired to the aircraft boneyard at Mojave Air and Space Port in California for use as a source of spare parts for NASA's Stratospheric Observatory for Infrared Astronomy (SOFIA) aircraft.

=== September ===
24 September

- Shuttle Carrier Aircraft N905A by NASA; found to have few parts useful for the SOFIA aircraft, N905A is later earmarked for museum display at the Johnson Space Center in Houston, Texas.

== Deadliest crash ==
The deadliest crash of this year was Dana Air Flight 992, a McDonnell Douglas MD-80 which crashed in Lagos, Nigeria on 3 June, killing all 153 people on board, as well as six on the ground.
