= 2014 in aviation =

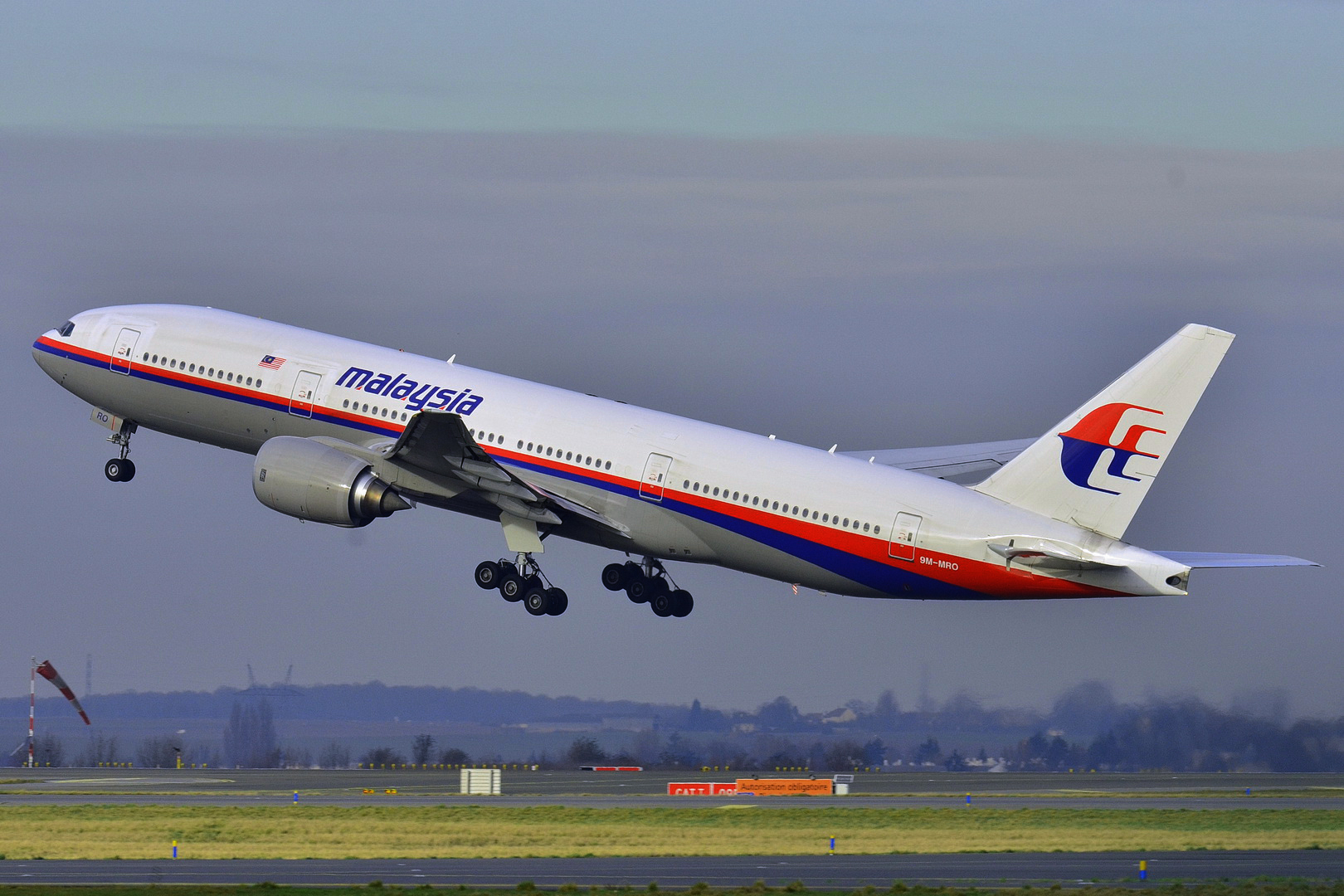
2014 in aviation was marked by the disappearance and search for Malaysia Airlines Flight 370.

This is a list of aviation-related events in 2014.

== Events ==
=== January ===
10 January

- In Jakarta, Indonesia, Halim Perdanakusuma Airport resumes service of scheduled flights after a hiatus of almost 29 years to relieve overcrowding at the city's main airport, Soekarno–Hatta International Airport. It is the first time since the opening of Soekarno–Hatta International in March 1985 that Halim Perdanakusuma Airport has handled anything other than charter and military flights and general aviation.

20 January

- Școala Superioară de Aviație Civilă Flight 111, a Romanian Superior School of Aviation Britten-Norman BN-2A-27 Islander registered YR-BNP and carrying an organ-harvesting medical team, crashes in the Apuseni Mountains in Romania during a domestic flight from Bucharest to Oradea, killing two of the seven people on board.

=== February ===
5 February

- Merpati Nusantara Airlines ceases flight operations due to financial problems.

11 February

- Myanma Airways (the future Myanmar National Airlines) signs the largest single aircraft order in the history of Myanmar (known until 1989 as Burma). The $960 million order with GECAS for six Boeing 737-800 and four Boeing 737 MAX airliners is the largest sale to Myanmar (or Burma) by a U.S. company in decades.
- An Algerian Air Force Lockheed C-130 Hercules transport aircraft carrying Algerian military personnel and their families crashes in bad weather into Djebel Fertas mountain near Aïn Kercha, Oum El Bouaghi Province, Algeria, killing 77 of the 78 people on board.

16 February

- Nepal Airlines Flight 183, a de Havilland Canada DHC-6 Twin Otter, crashes into a hill at Dhikura, Nepal, during a domestic flight to Jumla from Pokhara Airport, killing all 18 people on board. The same aircraft was previously involved in a 1973 hijacking.

17 February

- Hailemedhin Abera Tegegn, the co-pilot of Ethiopian Airlines Flight 702 – a Boeing 767-3BGER with 202 people on board bound from Addis Ababa, Ethiopia, to Rome, Italy – locks the cockpit door while the pilot is out of the cockpit to use the toilet and flies the plane to Geneva, Switzerland, where he uses a rope to climb from the cockpit window to the runway. He surrenders to authorities and requests asylum.

=== March ===
8 March

- Malaysia Airlines Flight 370 – the Boeing 777-2H6ER 9M-MRO – vanishes over the Gulf of Thailand while it is flying from Kuala Lumpur, Malaysia, to Beijing, China, at an altitude of 35,000 feet (11,000 meters) with 239 people on board. An investigation concludes that the airliner turns off course after ground stations lose radio contact with it and flies to the southern Indian Ocean, where it presumably crashes, although an extensive search yields no trace of it.

13 March

- An AgustaWestland AW139 helicopter operated by Haughey Air crashes in the United Kingdom shortly after take-off from Gillingham, Norfolk, for a flight to Rostrevor, County Down, killing all four people aboard, including Edward Haughey, Baron Ballyedmond.

27 March

- World Airways ceases operations after 66 years of service.

30 March

- TAM Airlines and US Airways leave the Star Alliance airline alliance.

31 March

- TAM Airlines and US Airways join the Oneworld airline alliance.

=== April ===
14 April

- Google confirms that it has purchased Titan Aerospace, a manufacturer of unmanned aerial vehicles (UAVs). Google plans to use Titan Aerospace to develop UAVs capable of bringing Internet connectivity to remote parts of the world. The UAVs are to supplement Google's Project Loon, which employs huge helium balloons for the same purpose. Titan Aerospace can produce UAVs which can remain airborne for up to five years without refueling or landing.

30 April

- A failure of the En Route Automation Modernization (ERAM) computer system at a Federal Aviation Administration air traffic control facility at Palmdale Regional Airport in Palmdale, California, grounds flights at airports in the Los Angeles, California, area for over an hour. At Los Angeles International Airport over 200 flights are delayed and 23 cancelled, and departures from Bob Hope Airport in Burbank are delayed for 90 minutes. Planes also are grounded at John Wayne Airport in Santa Ana, California, and McCarran International Airport in Las Vegas, Nevada. Dozens of inbound flights are diverted to other airports, and flights to the Los Angeles area are held on the ground throughout the United States until the problem is corrected. Twenty-seven flights to Los Angeles International are canceled, 212 are delayed, and 27 are diverted to other airports, including 15 that land at Phoenix Sky Harbor Airport in Phoenix, Arizona, and five that land at Salt Lake City International Airport in Salt Lake City, Utah. The flight disruptions affect tens of thousands of passengers.

=== May ===
17 May

- At the end of a flight from Vientiane, Laos, the Lao People's Liberation Army Air Force Antonov An-74TK-300 RDPL-34020 crashes in a wooded area between 1,500 and 2,000 meters (4,900 and 6,600 ft) short of the runway while on final approach to Xieng Khouang Airport in Phonsavan, Laos. Between 14 and 20 people reportedly are aboard and only three survive. Among the dead are Douangchay Phichit, the Laotian Deputy Prime Minister and Minister of National Defense, and his wife, as well as Thongbanh Sengaphone, the Laotian Minister of Public Security; Cheuang Sombounkhanh of the Secretariat of the Central Committee of the Lao People's Revolutionary Party and chairman of the Propaganda Training Committee; Pany Yathotou, a member of the Laotian National Assembly and its president from 2010 to 2014; and Soukanh Mahalath, the governor of Vientiane Province. It is the second-deadliest aviation accident in Laotian history, exceeded only by the crash of Lao Airlines Flight 301 in October 2013.

28 May

- The search for Malaysia Airlines Flight 370, which disappeared on 8 March, is suspended, having found no trace of the aircraft. It will not resume until October, after an extensive underwater mapping effort in the next planned search area is completed.

31 May

- 19-year-old pilot Matt Guthmiller departs Gillespie Field in El Cajon, California in an attempt to become the youngest pilot to circumnavigate the globe, solo.
- A private Gulfstream IV business jet catches fire while taking off from Hanscom Field in Bedford, Massachusetts, and crashes, killing all seven people on board. Lewis Katz, co-owner of The Philadelphia Inquirer, the Philadelphia Daily News, and Philly.com, is among the dead.

=== June ===
2 June

- The Solar Impulse 2 solar-powered aircraft makes its maiden flight over Payerne, Switzerland. In a 2-hour 17-minute flight, pilot Markus Scherdel climbs to an altitude of 1,800 meters (5,900 feet) and tests the aircraft in a series of maneuvers, beginning a test-flight program that will last for several months. Plans call for Solar Impulse 2 to become the first solar-powered aircraft to circumnavigate the Earth in 2015.

12 June

- The low-cost Indian-Malaysian airline AirAsia India begins flight operations, offering service between Bangalore and Goa with Airbus A320-200 aircraft and making the Malaysian airline AirAsia the first foreign airline to operate a subsidiary in India.

13 June

- American physician Richard Rockefeller is killed when the Piper PA-46-500TP Malibu Meridian he is piloting strikes a tree while taking off in dense fog and heavy rain from Westchester County Airport in White Plains, New York, and crashes in Harrison, a mile (1.6 km) from the airport.

14 June

- Pro-Russian separatists open fire with anti-aircraft weapons and heavy machine guns and shoot down a Ukrainian Ilyushin Il-76 (NATO reporting name "Candid") military transport aircraft carrying 40 Ukrainian paratroopers and a crew of nine as it lands at Luhansk International Airport in Luhansk, Ukraine. All 49 people on board die.

17 June

- Thai AirAsia X, Thailand's first long-haul, low-cost airline, begins flight operations, offering service between Bangkok's Don Mueang International Airport and Incheon International Airport in South Korea.

23 June

- Two aircraft collide at Olsberg, Germany, killing 2.

24 June

- Pakistan International Airlines Flight 756, an Airbus A310, was hit by gunfire, killing one passenger.

28 June

- The National Aeronautics and Space Administration (NASA) conducts the first test of the Low-Density Supersonic Decelerator (LDSD), a space vehicle designed to create atmospheric drag in order to decelerate during entry through a planet's atmosphere. Launched from the United States Navy's Pacific Missile Range facility in Kauai, Hawaii, the LDSD is lifted to an altitude of 120,000 feet (37,000 meters) by a balloon, then uses a rocket motor to ascend to 180,000 feet (55,000 meters) before parachuting into the Pacific Ocean, where it and its flight recorder are recovered the same day.

=== July ===
1 July

- The second incarnation of AirAsia Japan is founded, with plans to begin flight operations in June 2015.

3 July

- The United States Department of Defense grounds its entire fleet of 97 F-35 Lightning II aircraft for the eighth time pending engine inspections in the wake of a 23 June engine fire in a United States Air Force F-35A Lightning II as it prepared for take off at Eglin Air Force Base, Florida.

11 July

- Air India joins the Star Alliance.
- Flying a Pilatus PC-12 NG, Amelia Rose Earhart and her co-pilot Shane Jordan complete a 17-stop, 24,300-nautical-mile (27,964-mile; 45,004-km) circumnavigation of the earth, landing at Oakland, California – from which they had begun the journey on 26 June – spending 108 hours in the air. Earhart makes the flight to recreate and complete the final flight of her namesake Amelia Earhart, who had disappeared in 1937 while attempting a similar circumnavigation. Thirty-one years old, she becomes the second-youngest woman after Richarda Morrow-Tait to pilot a plane around the world.

14 July

- Nineteen-year-old Matt Guthmiller lands at Gillespie Field in El Cajon, California, becoming the youngest person ever to complete a solo flight around the world. He had left El Cajon on 31 May and flown more than 30,000 miles (48,000 km) in a Beechcraft A36 Bonanza, stopping first at his home town of Aberdeen, South Dakota, and then making stops in the United Kingdom; Rome, Italy; Athens, Greece; Cairo, Egypt; Abu Dhabi; India; the Philippines; Australia; American Samoa; and Hawaii. The final leg of his trip is a 16-hour flight across the eastern Pacific Ocean from Kailua-Kona, Hawaii, to El Cajon.

15 July

- The United States Department of Defense cancels the international debut of the F-35 Lightning II fighter at the Farnborough International Airshow, planned for later in the week by an F-35B, because of the grounding of the F-35 fleet earlier in the month.

17 July

- During a flight from Amsterdam, the Netherlands, to Kuala Lumpur, Malaysia, with 298 occupants on board a Boeing 777-200ER operating as Malaysia Airlines Flight 17 (codeshared as KLM Flight 4103), was shot down by a Buk 9M38 surface-to-air missile and crashed near Hrabove in Donetsk Oblast, Ukraine, killing all on board. The Ukrainian government claims that either Russia or Russian separatists in Ukraine shot down the airliner while it cruised at an altitude of 33,000 feet (10,000 meters) using the Buk missile system (NATO reporting name "Gadfly;" U.S. Department of Defense designation "SA-11"). The United States later confirms that the missile was launched from the separatist-controlled portion of Ukraine. With 298 people killed, it is the deadliest Malaysia Airlines incident to date, surpassing Malaysia Airlines Flight 370, a Boeing 777-200ER which disappeared with 239 people aboard on 8 March 2014.

22 July

- airBaltic becomes the world's first airline to accept bitcoin as payment for online bookings.

23 July

- TransAsia Airways Flight 222, an ATR 72-500 with 58 people on board, crashes near the village of Xixi in the township of Husi during a go-around after an unsuccessful landing attempt at Magong Airport on Taiwan's Penghu Island at the end of a flight from Kaohsiung International Airport, Kaohsiung, Taiwan. The crash occurs in strong winds and heavy rain related to the passage of Typhoon Matmo near Penghu earlier in the day. Forty-eight of those aboard die, and all ten survivors are injured.

24 July

- Air Algérie Flight 5017, a McDonnell Douglas MD-83 with 110 passengers and a crew of six aboard, disappears from radar over northern Mali 50 minutes into its flight from Ouagadougou Airport, Ouagadougou, Burkina Faso, to Houari Boumediene Airport, Algiers, Algeria, and crashes, killing everyone on board. A French MQ-9 Reaper unmanned aerial vehicle discovers the aircraft's wreckage.

=== August ===
2 August

- The airline Emirates suspends service to Conakry, Guinea, because of a major Ebola virus disease outbreak in West Africa. Emirates flights which formerly stopped at Conakry on their way to Dakar, Senegal, will fly directly to Dakar instead during the suspension. Emirates becomes the first airline to suspend service because of the outbreak.
- The Phoenix Air Gulfstream III air ambulance jet N173PA carries the first Ebola patient ever to be evacuated to the United States, carrying humanitarian aid worker Dr. Kent Bradley, an employee of Samaritan's Purse, from Liberia via Lajes Air Base, Azores, and Bangor, Maine, to Dobbins Air Reserve Base in Marietta, Georgia. The flight also marks the first time that an aircraft equipped with a biological containment system – the Aeromedical Biological Containment System (ABCS) – carries a patient. Only two jets exist with a capability to transport an Ebola patient and both are Phoenix Air Gulfstream IIIs equipped with the ABCS.

10 August

- Sepahan Airlines Flight 5915, a HESA IrAn-140, crashes just after takeoff from Mehrabad International Airport in Tehran, Iran, killing 40 of the 48 people on board.

11 August

- Ivory Coast becomes the first country to ban all passenger flights from Guinea, Liberia, and Sierra Leone, fearing that airline passengers from those countries will spread the major Ebola outbreak into Ivory Coast, and Nigeria suspends flights by Gambia Bird Airlines until it takes steps to contain the spread of the disease.
- In accordance with a police request, the Federal Aviation Administration imposes a no-fly zone covering a 3.4-mile (5.5-km) radius around Ferguson, Missouri, because of ongoing racial unrest there, extending to an altitude of 5,000 feet (1,500 meters). By the morning of 12 August, the altitude limit will be reduced to 3,000 feet (910 meters) to avoid interference with traffic at Lambert–St. Louis International Airport.

13 August

- A Cessna Citation 560 XLS+ operating as TAM Flight 8220 crashes while attempting to land for the second time in bad weather at Santos Air Force Base in Santos, São Paulo, Brazil, killing all seven people aboard, including Brazilian Socialist Party presidential candidate Eduardo Campos. The plane crashes into two houses and a gymnasium in a residential area of Santos and damages several other houses, injuring at least five people on the ground.

=== September ===
15 September

- Air France's pilots begin a strike, prompted by Air France' plans to expand its low-cost Transavia brand, demanding that the airline provide the same salary and benefits that they receive to pilots employed by Transavia. Air France refuses on the grounds that such pay and benefits would be incompatible with the low-cost model intended for Transavia. The strike forces Air France to cancel nearly 60 percent of its flights.

28 September

- Under increasing pressure from the French government and general public, Air France's pilots end their 14-day strike, giving up on their attempt to force Air France to provide the same pay and benefits they receive to pilots of its low-cost Transavia brand and freeing the airline to expand Transavia's operations. The strike has forced the cancellation of up to 60 percent of Air France's flights, stranded passengers worldwide, and cost Air France more than 280 million euros ($355 million). Air France plans to begin a progressive return to normal service on 30 September.

30 September

- The European Aviation Safety Agency (EASA) issues a type certificate for the Airbus A350-900 airliner, certifying that the aircraft complies with safety and environmental requirements EASA establishes and enforces for the European Union. The A350-900 becomes the first Airbus passenger aircraft with a new design to be entirely certified by EASA, from the application by Airbus in 2007 until the type certification.

=== October ===
1 October

The United States Air Force reactivates the Nineteenth Air Force. It had been inactive since July 2012.

6 October

- The search for Malaysia Airlines Flight 370, missing since 8 March, resumes in the Indian Ocean after having been suspended on 28 May. The new phase of the search, involving three ships, has the potential to last a year.

20 October

- French businessman Christophe de Margerie, chairman and chief executive officer of the French oil corporation Total S.A., dies when his corporate Dassault Falcon 50 jet collides on takeoff with a snow plow operated by a reportedly drunk driver and crashes in flames on the runway just before midnight at Vnukovo International Airport in Moscow, Russia, . The other three people on the Falcon – its crew – also die.

24 October

- Alan Eustace sets a new world balloon altitude record, ascending to 41,424 meters (135,906 feet) in a helium balloon over New Mexico. He then parachutes from the balloon at an altitude of 135,890 feet (41,420 meters). The jump breaks the previous world record for highest parachute jump of 128,100 feet (39,000 meters) that Felix Baumgartner set on 14 October 2012. During his 14-minute 19-second descent, Eustace reaches a speed of 822 miles per hour (1,323 km/h); Mach 1.23), creating a small sonic boom heard by observers on the ground and setting an American record for speed achieved without traveling in a jet aircraft or spacecraft. His free fall of 123,414 feet (37,617 meters) before opening his parachute at an altitude of 12,476 feet (3,803 meters) sets a new world free fall distance record.

29 October

- SkyWay Enterprises Flight 7101, a Short 360, crashed at Princess Juliana International Airport, killing two.

30 October

- Departing for Mena Intermountain Municipal Airport in Mena, Arkansas, Beechcraft King Air B200 N52SZ crashes into the FlightSafety International building immediately after takeoff from Wichita Dwight D. Eisenhower National Airport in Wichita, Kansas, after its pilot reports the failure of its left engine. Over 100 people are in the building at the time. The pilot, who is alone in the plane, dies in the crash, which also kills three people in the building and injures five others, one of them critically.

31 October

- With two test pilots on board and using a new fuel mix that had been tested successfully on the ground, Virgin Galactic's SpaceShipTwo, the first spaceship designed for space tourism, explodes over the Mojave Desert in California during its fourth test flight and first powered flight since 10 January. The explosion occurs shortly after SpaceShipTwo detaches from its carrier aircraft, White Knight Two, and ignites its rocket engine. SpaceShipTwo breaks into large pieces and crashes, killing one of its pilots, whose body is found in its wreckage, and severely injuring the other, who ejects. The accident is a major blow to the fledgling space tourism industry.

=== November ===
12 November

- In the Nagorno-Karabakh conflict, the Azerbaijani Armed Forces shoot down an Armenian Mil Mi-24 attack helicopter, killing all three of its crew members. The Government of Azerbaijan claims that the Mi-24 belonged to the Armenian armed forces and was preparing to attack Azerbaijani military forces in Azerbaijan's Agdam District, while the Government of Armenia says that the helicopter belonged to the separatist Nagorno-Karabakh Defense Army (NKR), and both Armenian and NKR officials claim that it was on an unarmed flight and did not enter Azerbaijan's airspace.

15 November

- The United States National Weather Service warns aircraft to avoid airspace near Mount Pavlof, a stratovolcano of the Aleutian Range on the Alaska Peninsula in Alaska, where ash from an eruption that began on 12 November has reached an altitude of 30,000 feet (9,100 meters). The ash cloud lies along popular international air routes between Europe, North America, and Asia.

=== December ===
- Myanma Airways is renamed Myanmar National Airlines.

11 December

- Citing an inability of Libya to ensure the safety of the Libyan commercial aviation industry, the European Union bans all seven Libyan airlines – Afriqiyah Airways, Air Libya, Buraq Air, Ghadames Air Transport, Global Aviation and Services Group, Libyan Airlines, and Petro Air – from operating in the airspace of its 28-member countries. The action brings the number of countries banned from flying over European Union countries to 21, and the number of airlines banned to 310.

15 December

- Loganair Flight 6780 makes an emergency landing at Sumburgh Airport due to a rapid loss of altitude following a lightning strike and pilot error.

22 December

- In a filing with the United States Patent and Trademark Office, Amazon reveals that it is exploring the use of large airships – which it calls "airborne fulfillment centers" – to serve as flying warehouses from which unmanned aerial vehicles will deliver packages and with pinpoint accuracy to customers in public areas and more quickly than is possible with UAVs dispatched from ground bases. The UAVs also could operate more cheaply than ground-based ones because floating or gliding toward the ground and turning their propellers on only for final navigation toward the customer would reduce fuel consumption. The filing will not become public knowledge until December 2016.

28 December

- Indonesia AirAsia Flight 8501, an Airbus A320-216 registered as PK-AXC making a flight from Juanda International Airport in Surabaya, Indonesia, to Changi Airport in Singapore with 157 passengers and seven crew members on board, disappears at an altitude of 32,000 feet (9,800 meters) while traversing a storm cluster over the Java Sea between Java and Kalimantan after requesting permission to climb to 38,000 feet (12,000 meters) to avoid thick clouds. Combined with the loss of Malaysia Airlines Flight 370 in March, the incident sets a record for presumed fatalities aboard missing airliners at the same time in a single year, with 401 people missing and presumed dead aboard the two flights.

30 December

- After two days of searching, the first bodies and wreckage from Indonesia AirAsia Flight 8501 are discovered in the Karimata Strait.

== First flights ==
- 18 February - Cessna Latitude - N3765L
- 9 April – Bombardier Aerospace Learjet 85 - N851LJ.
- 11 March – Airbus E-Fan
- 2 June – Solar Impulse 2
- 26 July – AHRLAC Holdings Ahrlac
- 25 September – Airbus A320neo-F-WNEO
- October – AeroMobil s.r.o. AeroMobil Version 3.0
- 10 November – Bell 505 Jet Ranger X

== Entered service ==
=== February ===
- Sukhoi Su-35 (NATO reporting name "Flanker-E") with the Russian Federation Air Force's 23rd Fighter Regiment

== Retirements ==
- McDonnell Douglas DC-10 by Biman Bangladesh Airlines
- McDonnell Douglas MD-11 by KLM
- Boeing 747-400 by Air New Zealand
- Boeing 747-400 by Philippine Airlines
- Boeing 747SP by Iran Air
- Boeing 737-400 by US Airways
- Boeing 747-400 by ANA
- Boeing 767-200 by American Airlines

== Deadliest crash ==
The deadliest crash of this year was Malaysia Airlines Flight 17, a Boeing 777 which was shot down on 17 July near Hrabove, Ukraine, killing all 298 people on board; it is the deadliest airliner shoot-down in aviation history. Flight 17 also marked the deadliest plane crash of the 2010s decade, and not withstanding the September 11 attacks, it is the deadliest aviation crash of the 21st century.
