= Naga Airport =

Airport serving Naga, Camarines Sur, Philippines

Naga Airport Palayogan nin Naga Paliparan ng Naga
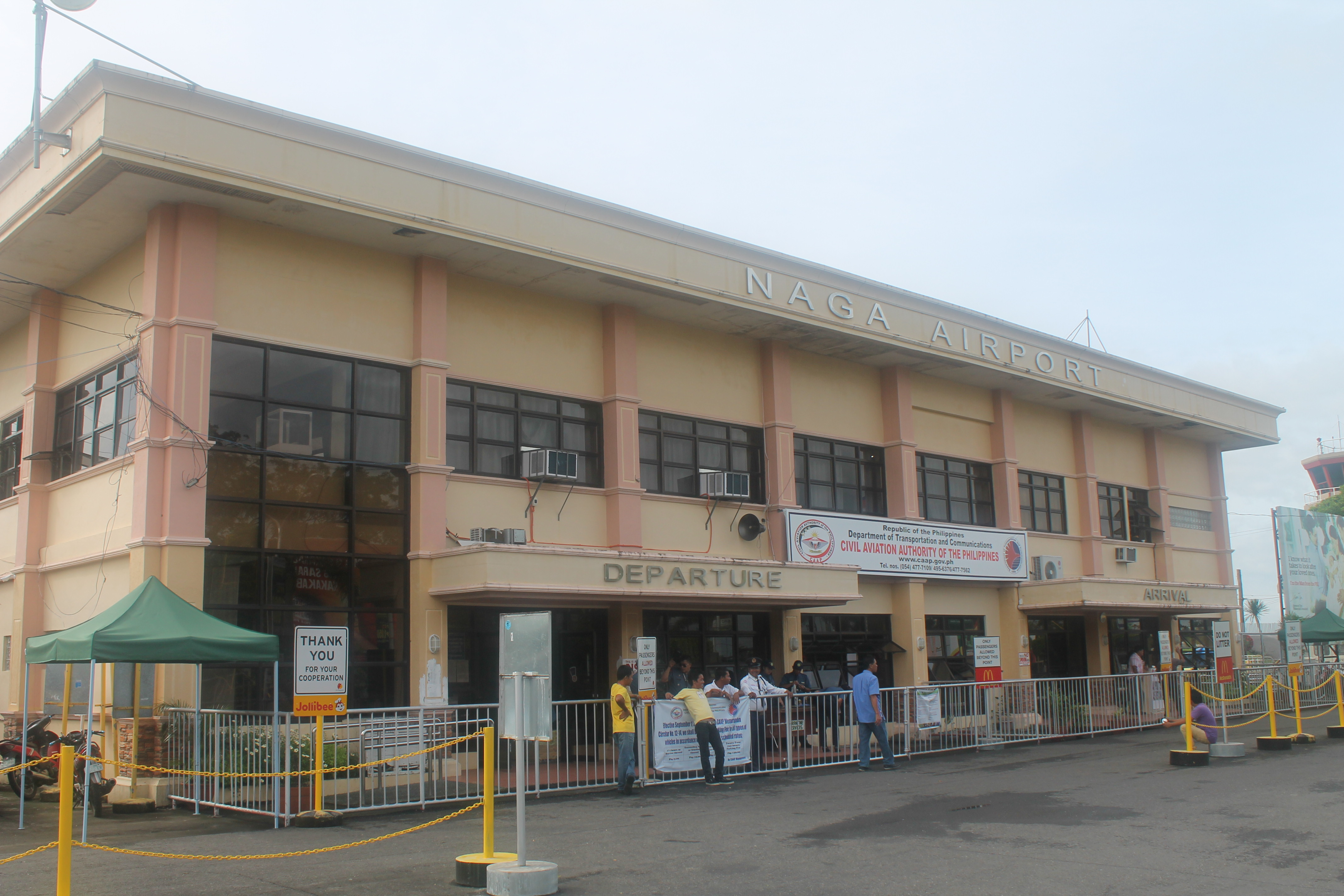
- Exterior of Naga Airport
- IATA: WNP; ICAO: RPUN

Summary
- Airport type: Public
- Owner/Operator: Civil Aviation Authority of the Philippines
- Serves: Naga
- Location: Pili, Camarines Sur, Philippines
- Elevation AMSL: 43 m (141 ft)
- Coordinates: 13°35′05″N 123°16′12″E

Map
- Location within Luzon Location within Philippines

Runways
Direction	Length		Surface
Direction	m	ft	Surface
04/22	1,402	4,600	Asphalt

Statistics (2022)
- Passengers: 71,487
- Aircraft movements: 1,268
- Cargo in kgs: 32,528
- Civil Aviation Authority of the Philippines, Aerodrome Management & Development Service

Naga Airport (IATA: WNP, ICAO: RPUN) is an airport serving the city and metropolitan area of Naga (including the provincial capital Pili), located in the province of Camarines Sur in the Philippines. Although the airport is named after Naga, it is actually located in the provincial capital, Pili. The airport is classified as a Class 1 principal (major domestic) airport by the Civil Aviation Authority of the Philippines, a body of the Department of Transportation (DOTr) that is responsible for the operations of not only this airport but also of all other airports in the Philippines except the major international airports.

In 2019, the DOTr announced that they intended to make the airport capable of handling flights at night by 2021. As of March 2022, the airport is considered to be night-rated by the CAAP.

== Airlines and destinations ==
Airlines	Destinations
Cebgo	Clark

== Accidents and incidents ==
- On December 15, 1993, a Philippine Air Force C-130 Hercules crashed on Mt. Manase, in Barangay Tanag, Libmanan, Camarines Sur, as it was approaching Naga Airport. The plane was on a typhoon relief mission. The total fatalities were 30, including 6 crewmembers.
- On June 24, 1996, an Air Philippines NAMC YS-11 aircraft struck a ground power unit while taxiing at Naga Airport (WNP). The aircraft caught fire. There were no fatalities among the 34 aircraft occupants.
- On August 18, 2012, a Piper Seneca carrying Interior Secretary and former Naga Mayor Jesse Robredo crashed while attempting to make an emergency landing at the Moises R. Espinosa Airport in Masbate City. The aircraft was en route from Mactan–Cebu International Airport to Naga when it encountered an engine failure. Three persons were killed, including Secretary Robredo.

== See also ==
- List of airports in the Philippines
