= Lenarčič =

Lenarčič is a Slovenian surname. Notable people with the surname include:

- Janez Lenarčič (born 1967), Slovenian diplomat
- Jure Lenarčič (born 1990), Slovenian canoeist
- Matevž Lenarčič (fl. 2002), Slovenian aircraft pilot
