= Ghazi al-Sadiq =

Sudanese politician

- Died: 19 August 2012 near Talodi, South Kordofan, Sudan
- Occupation: politician

Ghazi al-Sadiq (died 19 August 2012) was a Sudanese politician. In July 2012, he was appointed as Guidance and Religious Endowments Minister, having previously served as Minister of Tourism and Antiquities.

He died in a plane crash on 19 August 2012 near Talodi, South Kordofan, Sudan, which killed at least 31 other people. Initial reports focused on an attack by Sudan People's Liberation Movement North as a likely cause of the crash, but Sudan's information minister later stated to Radio Omdurman that bad weather had caused the plane to crash into a hill. The plane was carrying a delegation to an Eid al-Fitr celebration. At least 31 other people died in the crash, including several state ministers and the chairman of the Justice Party.
