= 2012 Masbate Piper Seneca crash =

Plane crash in near Masbate, Philippines

Accident
- Date: August 18, 2012
- Summary: Crashed on approach due to engine failure and pilot error
- Site: Off the coast of Masbate Island near Moises R. Espinosa Airport, Masbate City, Philippines; 12°23′18″N 123°37′36″E

Aircraft
- Aircraft type: Piper PA-34-200 Seneca I
- Operator: Aviatour Air
- Call sign: X4431
- Registration: RP-C4431
- Flight origin: Mactan–Cebu International Airport, Lapu-Lapu City, Philippines
- Destination: Naga Airport, Naga, Camarines Sur, Philippines
- Occupants: 4
- Passengers: 2
- Crew: 2
- Fatalities: 3
- Injuries: 1
- Survivors: 1

On August 18, 2012, a Piper PA-34 Seneca light aircraft with four people on board, including Philippine Interior Secretary Jesse Robredo, crashed in the sea near the island province of Masbate, Philippines, while flying from Lapu-Lapu City to Naga, Camarines Sur. Robredo and two other occupants were killed in the accident.

== Background ==
Interior and Local Government Secretary Robredo and his aide, Police Chief Inspector June Paolo Abrazado, were in Cebu to attend the National Summit of the Community Investigative Support and the Criminal Investigation and Detection Group. Robredo originally booked an airline flight from Mactan–Cebu International Airport to Manila, but instead chartered an aircraft to take him to Naga so he could be with his family.

== Accident ==
Key locations of the flight

The aircraft was a Piper PA-34-200 Seneca I, registered RP-C4431. In addition to Robredo and Abrazado there were two crew on board; the pilot who was also the CEO of Aviatour Air (the company that operated the aircraft); and the co-pilot, a Nepalese national.

En route to Naga the crew of the Seneca requested an emergency landing at Masbate Airport, citing engine problems. At around 15:30, Abrazado sent a text message, informing the recipient that they were returning to Cebu due to a problem with one of the propellers. He also asked to be re-booked for the earliest possible flight out of Mactan. However, at 16:02, Abrazado sent more messages, stating that the airplane was making an emergency landing at Masbate Airport.

The airplane then crashed into the sea off the shores of Masbate Island some 300 meters (980 ft) away from the island's airport. Of the four people aboard the aircraft, the sole survivor, Robredo's aide, said that the airplane broke apart as it hit the water.

== Search and recovery ==
More than 200 rescuers together with Philippine military divers and helicopters started searching for the passengers after the crash. Assistance was also provided by Korean technical divers and a lone German diver. Additionally, the United States Navy sent the USNS Safeguard, a rescue and salvage ship that was undergoing repairs in a dry dock at Subic Bay, to help.

Abrazado was then found about 500 meters (1,600 ft) off the coast, along with the wreckage. The first part of the airplane found was the tip of the right wing. A flight manifest containing the name of Jesse Robredo was also found near the site of accident the next day. On August 20, debris from the aircraft was recovered.

President Benigno Aquino III went to Masbate the day after the crash to personally receive updates on the situation. He was accompanied by Transport Secretary Mar Roxas, who said that special sonar equipment was also sent to aid in the search and that "we just want to do everything we can to save him [Robredo]." Aquino also said that Abrazado was conscious and had only a few injuries.

On August 21, Roxas announced that divers had found the inverted fuselage and that Robredo's body was brought to shore by the Philippine Coast Guard. The wreckage was some 800 meters (0.5 mi) from the Masbate shoreline at a depth of about 54 meters (177 ft). On August 22, divers recovered a second body, later identified as that of the pilot, by raising the wreckage to a depth of 21 meters (69 ft). The copilot's body was retrieved by the crew of a passenger ferry the next day after it was seen floating near the crash site.

== Reactions ==
The government called for a prayer vigil at a chapel in Manila. The company that owns the aircraft suspended its operations without waiting for an official order. Following the retrieval of Robredo's remains, President Aquino declared a national day of mourning and announced that a state funeral would be held, while flags were flown at half-mast. Paquito Ochoa, Jr. was named to Robredo's portfolio in an interim capacity.

== Investigation ==
President Aquino revealed details of the accident investigation and its findings during a media briefing on November 13, 2012. The investigation found that improper maintenance led to the right engine suffering an internal failure, which likely would have caused misfiring and intermittent operation of the fuel pump. The failure was gradual and the aircraft developed engine problems 23 minutes after take off. However, instead of turning back to Cebu, the pilot decided to continue the flight, until the engine failed completely 37 minutes later and the aircraft crashed during the subsequent attempt to land at Masbate. The investigation determined that the pilot didn't use the correct procedure for trying to land a Piper Seneca with one engine inoperative, in that he lowered the undercarriage and flaps too soon; and that during his last flight proficiency test he had not been tested with respect to flying with one engine inoperative.

The investigation found that the maintenance of the Seneca had been undertaken by Aviatour Air, but that the company was not authorised or approved to do so. It also found that records relating to a test flight for renewal of the aircraft's certificate of airworthiness in January 2012 had been falsified and that the test flight never took place. An airworthiness inspector of the Civil Aviation Authority of the Philippines was suspended from duty as a result, pending the outcome of a separate investigation. Representatives of the pilot's family and Aviatour Air disputed the findings.

== See also ==
- 1957 Cebu Douglas C-47 crash
- 2021 Piedade de Caratinga Beechcraft King Air crash
