= Shin Ito =

Japanese wingsuit pilot and skydiver

Shin Ito (伊藤 慎一, Itō Shin'ichi) (born December 1964 in Tokyo, Japan) is a Japanese wingsuit pilot and skydiver who in 2012 held the world records for "Greatest horizontal distance flown in a wingsuit" 26.9 km (16.71 miles), "Greatest absolute distance flown in a wingsuit" 28.707 km (17.83 miles) above California, USA on 26 May 2012, and "Fastest speed reached in a wingsuit of 363 km/h (226 mph), achieved on 28 May 2011.

He was a member of a US National Wingsuit flying formation record by 68 pilots in 2009.

Ito is CEO of Risk Control Corp, in Japan.

== Bibliography ==
- How to Escape from Crisis (危機からの脱出方法, Kiki kara no dasshutsu hōhō), Bestsellers, August 2001, ISBN 978-4-584-18623-7
