= 2012 Talodi Antonov An-26 crash =

Aviation accident in Sudan

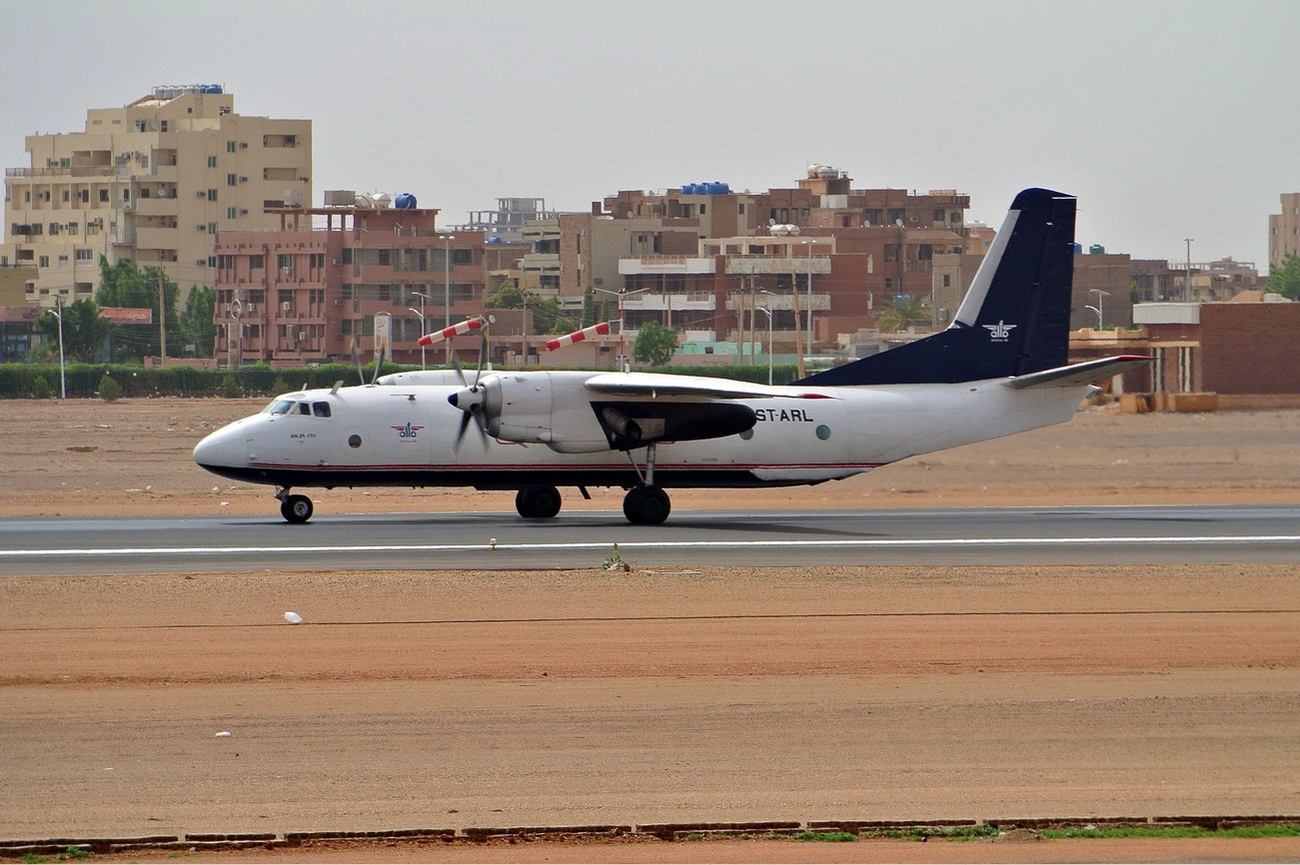
- ST-ARL, the An-26 involved, pictured a month before the accident

Accident
- Date: 19 August 2012
- Summary: Controlled flight into terrain due to poor weather conditions and pilot error
- Site: Nuba Mountains near Talodi, Sudan; 10°36′24.84″N 30°24′12.87″E

Aircraft
- Aircraft type: Antonov An-26-100
- Operator: Alfa Airlines
- Registration: ST-ARL
- Flight origin: Khartoum International Airport, Khartoum, Sudan
- Destination: Talodi Airstrip, Talodi, Sudan
- Occupants: 32
- Passengers: 26
- Crew: 6
- Fatalities: 32
- Survivors: 0

On 19 August 2012, an Antonov An-26 airplane of Alfa Airlines crashed near the town of Talodi, Sudan, killing all 32 occupants on board. The aircraft was carrying a Sudanese government delegation, and among the victims were members of the Sudanese government, several high-ranking members of the Sudanese Armed Forces and other officials, and a television crew.

== Crash ==
The aircraft had taken off from Khartoum International Airport at around 6:02 a.m. local time. Approximately at 8 a.m., the plane crashed into the Hajar Al-Nar Mountain of the Nuba Mountain range near Talodi, a small town about 600 km (370 mi) southwest of Khartoum. A television statement said that the weather had prevented the aircraft from landing on its first attempt, and on its second attempt, the plane crashed into a mountain after a go-around procedure. Talodi airfield features a single paved, unmarked runway of 1800 m (5900 ft) length.

== Aircraft ==
Although some early media reports mistakenly announced the crash as a helicopter crash, the aircraft involved was a twin turboprop Antonov An-26-100, registration ST-ARL, chartered by the Sudanese Government and operated by the Sudanese private air carrier Alfa Airlines (ICAO code AAJ).

The aircraft was built in 1974 at the Ukrainian "Aviant" aircraft plant in the Soviet Union. It flew on Soviet and Russian regional routes until July 1998. It was sold to an Armenian air carrier, and then to Trans Attico, Air Libya, Ababeel Aviation, and other air companies in Africa. It was acquired by Alfa Airlines in July 2009 and was modified from Antonov An-26 to Antonov An-26-100 standard at the 410 Aircraft Repair Plant in Kyiv, Ukraine, in 2010.

There have been several deadly plane crashes in Sudan in recent years. All Sudanese airlines, including Alfa Airlines, are banned for safety reasons from flying in European airspace. The Sudanese authorities complain that it is difficult to get spare parts because of sanctions the United States has imposed against Khartoum. This crash was the first accident in the history of Alfa Airlines, which was founded only in 2009.

== Passengers and crew ==
Nationality	Passengers	Crew	Total
Sudan	26	3	29
Armenia	0	1	1
Russia	0	1	1
Tajikistan	0	1	1
Total	26	6	32

The chartered plane was carrying a Sudanese government delegation, from the capital of the country, Khartoum, to the town of Talodi in South Kordofan, a war-torn state with ongoing fighting between Sudan's army and rebel groups, for an Eid al-Fitr celebration, to mark the end of the holy month of Ramadan.

Among the victims were Guidance and Religious Endowments Minister Ghazi al-Sadiq Abdel Rahim.

The aircraft, with a crew of six, was flown by senior Russian captain Gennady Semenov, assisted by a Sudanese first officer, 43-year-old navigator Koshim Akram from Tajikistan, and 42-year-old Armenian flight engineer Armen Virabyan.

== Investigation ==
An official with Sudan's Civil Aviation Authority said that bad weather was responsible for the crash. The official news agency of Sudan, SUNA, also said the crash happened "due to the bad weather conditions". Minister of Information Ahmed Bilal Osman also added that the plane was attempting to land in bad weather conditions in Talodi, as seasonal heavy rains left the pilots with "zero visibility," when it crashed into a mountain.

Two days after the accident, rebels officially announced their role in shooting down the aircraft. Later, rebel spokesman Arnu Ngutulu Lodi denied that his rebel forces were involved with the crash, which happened outside of rebel territory.

Two days after the crash, on 21 August, Sudan Civil Aviation Authority (CAA) chief Mohammad Abdul-Aziz tendered his resignation to the President of Sudan Omar al-Bashir. However, President Bashir rejected his resignation, urging the chief to continue a newly approved program of reforms to the development and supervision of the CAA.

On 24 August, the local government reported the flight recorders have been found and recovered from the crash site.

Official investigation confirmed that visibility was low at the time of the accident due to poor weather and low clouds. It was therefore concluded that the accident was "the consequence of a controlled flight into terrain after the crew descended too low."
