= Ed Long (aviator) =

American pilot

- Born: John Edward Long Jr. October 15, 1915; Montgomery, Alabama, U.S.
- Died: July 18, 1999 (aged 83); Montgomery, Alabama, U.S.
- Aviation career
- First flight: 1933

John Edward Long Jr. (November 10, 1915 – July 18, 1999) was an American pilot who is in the Guinness Book of Records for the most flight time by a pilot: over 65,000 hours (more than seven years and four months) at the time of his death.

He began in 1933 at the age of 17, when he took his first and only flying lesson. In September 1989, he broke the previous record, 52,929 hours, set by Max Conrad in 1974. According to his brother, Ed Long's job involved checking power lines, so "most of that was under 200 feet (61 m), in a Piper Cub". Long's last flight was entered into his logbook June 21, 1999. He died July 18, 1999, at the age of 83.

Long was inducted into the Alabama Aviation Hall of Fame.
