= 2014 Algerian Air Force C-130 crash =

Aviation accident in Algeria

2014 Algeria C-130 crash
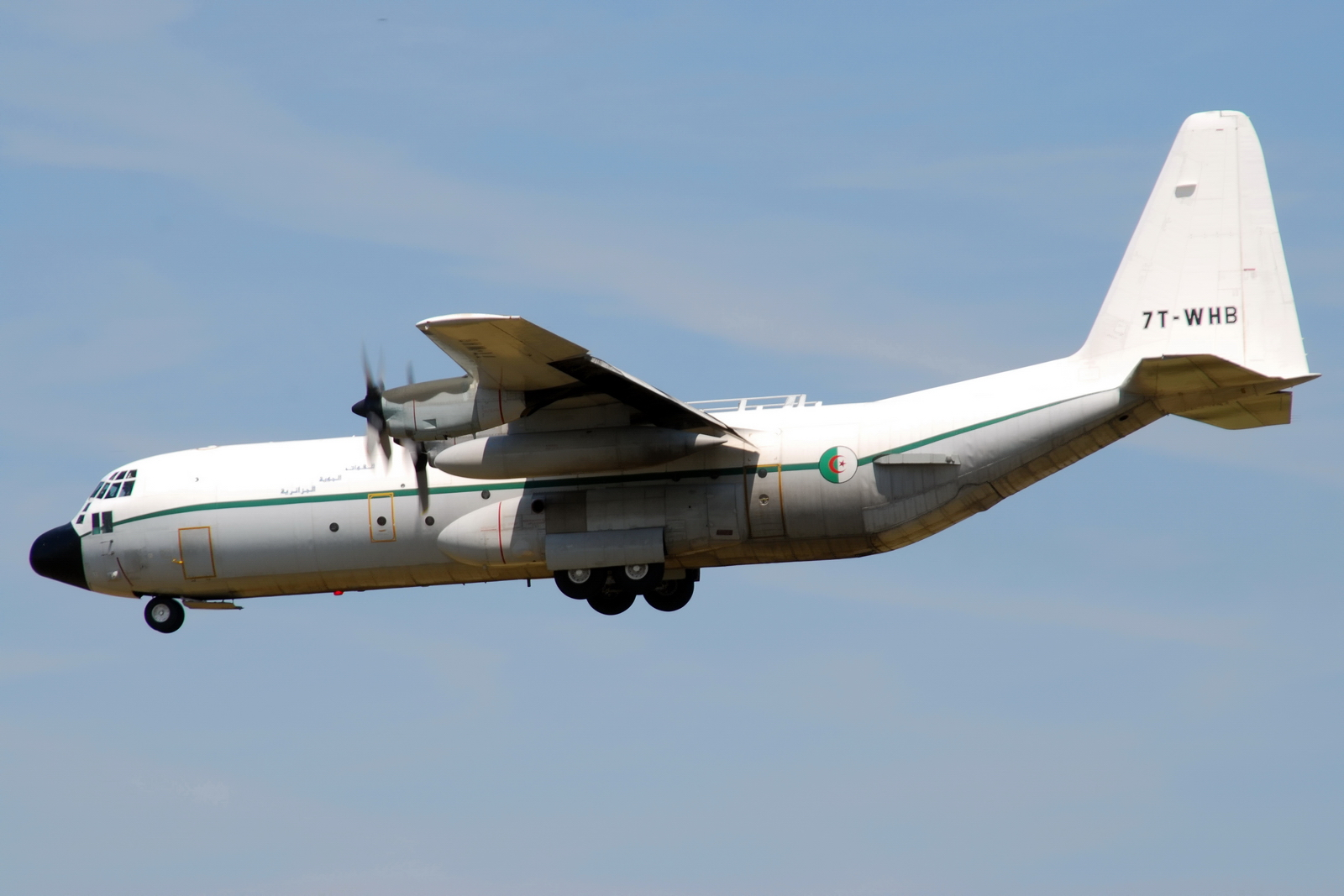
- An Algerian Air Force C-130 similar to the aircraft involved in the crash

Accident
- Date: 11 February 2014
- Summary: Controlled flight into terrain in bad weather
- Site: Near Aïn Kercha, Oum El Bouaghi Province, Algeria; 36°2′48.78″N 6°43′25.22″E

Aircraft
- Aircraft type: Lockheed C-130H-30 Hercules
- Operator: Algerian Air Force
- Registration: 7T-WHM
- Flight origin: Tamanrasset, Algeria
- Stopover: Ouargla, Algeria
- Destination: Constantine, Algeria
- Occupants: 78
- Passengers: 74
- Crew: 4
- Fatalities: 77
- Injuries: 1
- Survivors: 1

On 11 February 2014, a C-130 Hercules military transport aircraft of the Algerian Air Force, carrying 74 passengers and 4 crew members, crashed into Djebel Fertas mountain near Aïn Kercha, Algeria. Only one person survived.

The aircraft impacted mountainous terrain during its descent toward Mohamed Boudiaf International Airport in poor weather conditions, that included strong winds and snowfall, which reduced visibility in the region.

This was the largest crash in the country since the 2003 Air Algérie Flight 6289, in which 103 people died.

== Weather conditions ==
Algerian defence ministry said the crash was likely caused by bad weather, including a storm and cascading snow, which Algerian aviation experts said most likely had led to poor visibility.

According to AccuWeather, at the time of the crash "an area of low pressure moving through the region was producing widespread showers mixed with snow in the higher terrain of the area"; meteorologist Eric Leister added that, "along with the rain and snow, wind gusts more than 30 mph (48 km/h) were reported in several locations in the region".

== Accident ==
Contact with the aircraft was reportedly lost between Constantine and Oum El Bouaghi just before noon and air traffic controllers dispatched helicopters to search for it.

The sole survivor, a soldier, was taken to a military hospital in Constantine due to injuries from head trauma. The passengers included soldiers and members of their families.

== Aircraft ==
The aircraft was a US-manufactured C-130 Hercules with the registration number 7T-WHM. Lockheed Martin confirmed it sold C-130H aircraft to Algeria between 1981 and 1990.

As of 2011, Algeria had 16 of the type according to FlightGlobal.

== Investigation ==
Recovery teams located one of the two flight recorders, according to El Watan. Emergency services recovered 76 bodies from the site.

== Reaction ==
Algerian president Abdelaziz Bouteflika announced three days of state mourning starting 12 February, while also praising the dead soldiers as "martyrs". The defence ministry said it had established an investigative commission and that army chief of staff and deputy defence minister Ahmed Gaid Salah would visit the crash site.

== See also ==
- 2012 Norwegian C-130 crash
- 2018 Algerian Air Force crash
- List of accidents and incidents involving the Lockheed C-130 Hercules
- List of aviation accidents and incidents with a sole survivor
- Mirosławiec air disaster
- Air Algérie Flight 6289
