= Aviatour Air =

Filipino charter airline

Aviatour
- Founded: 2011
- Ceased operations: 2012
- Hubs: Mactan–Cebu International Airport
- Fleet size: 35
- Destinations: Visayas
- Headquarters: Mactan–Cebu International Airport; Lapu-Lapu, Philippines
- Key people: New (President) (Chairman CEO, Jemar Bahinting
- Website: flyaviatour.com

Aviatour's Fly'n, Inc., operating as Aviatour, was a charter airline with its corporate headquarters in the general aviation area of Mactan–Cebu International Airport, Lapu-Lapu, Central Visayas, Philippines. It operates air taxi services and charter flights in the Visayas. Its charter service includes sightseeing tours among islands in the Visayas and Mindanao.

The company experienced two plane crashes in 2012. The first crash occurred early in 2012. One of its planes, a Cessna 172 aircraft, crashed in Mambajao, Camiguin, while flying tourists from Mactan in Cebu. A pilot and a passenger were killed in the accident. The second accident occurred on 18 August 2012 which killed 3 including Jesse Robredo.
