= 2012 Kazakhstan Antonov An-72 crash =

Fatal plane crash in Kazakhstan

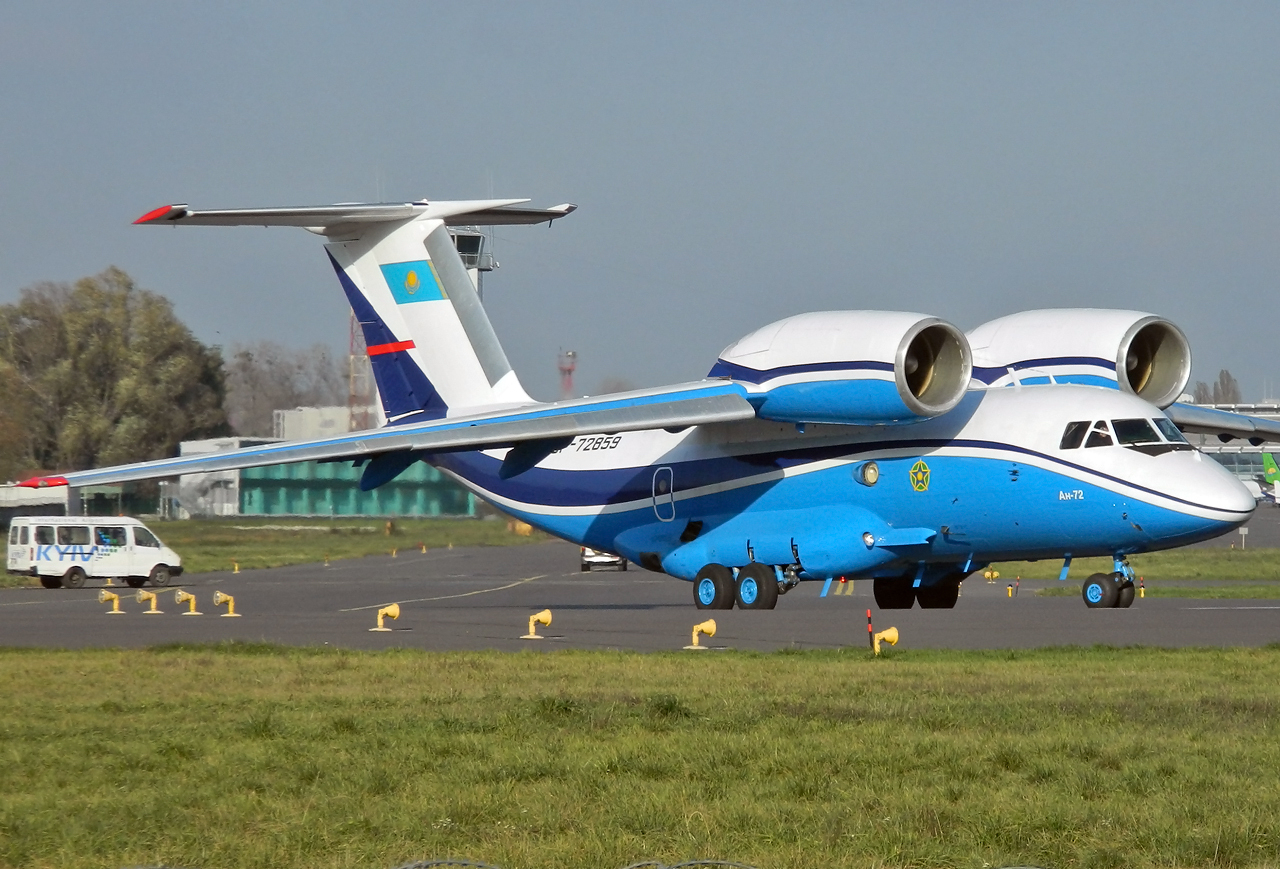
- UP-72859, the aircraft involved, photographed a month before the accident

Accident
- Date: 25 December 2012
- Summary: Crashed on descent short of runway in bad weather
- Site: Shymkent, Kazakhstan; 42.500°N 69.833°E

Aircraft
- Aircraft type: Antonov An-72-100
- Operator: Armed Forces of the Republic of Kazakhstan
- Registration: UP-72859
- Flight origin: Astana International Airport, Astana, Kazakhstan
- Destination: Shymkent International Airport, Shymkent, Kazakhstan
- Occupants: 27
- Passengers: 20
- Crew: 7
- Fatalities: 27
- Survivors: 0

On 25 December 2012, an Antonov An-72 military transport aircraft operated by the Kazakh Armed Forces crashed about 20 km (12 mi) from the city of Shymkent, Kazakhstan, where the aircraft was preparing to land. All 27 people on board died in the crash.

== History of the flight ==
The aircraft had been flying from Kazakhstan's capital of Astana to Shymkent, near the border with Uzbekistan, and was carrying seven crew and 20 members of the Kazakh border patrol, including its leader, the acting director of the Kazakhstan Border Guard Service, Colonel Turganbek Stambekov.

== Accident ==
The crash occurred at about 19:00 local time (1300 UTC) as the aircraft was descending to land. According to local media, the aircraft had been flying at an altitude around 800 m (2,600 ft), when it suddenly crashed to the ground. Emergency crews were dispatched from Shymkent in response. However, the head of the local emergency services department stated, "the plane was destroyed by fire. Only fragments [were] left." Kazakhstan's National Security Committee issued a statement confirming that all 27 people on board had died in the crash, and that an investigation into the incident had begun.

== Investigation ==
The investigation commission learned that failure of the autopilot and radio altimeter combined with poor visibility, and the pilot failing to follow instruction to use the barometric altimeter, caused the crash.
