= JetBlue Flight 191 =

2012 airline pilot mental health incident

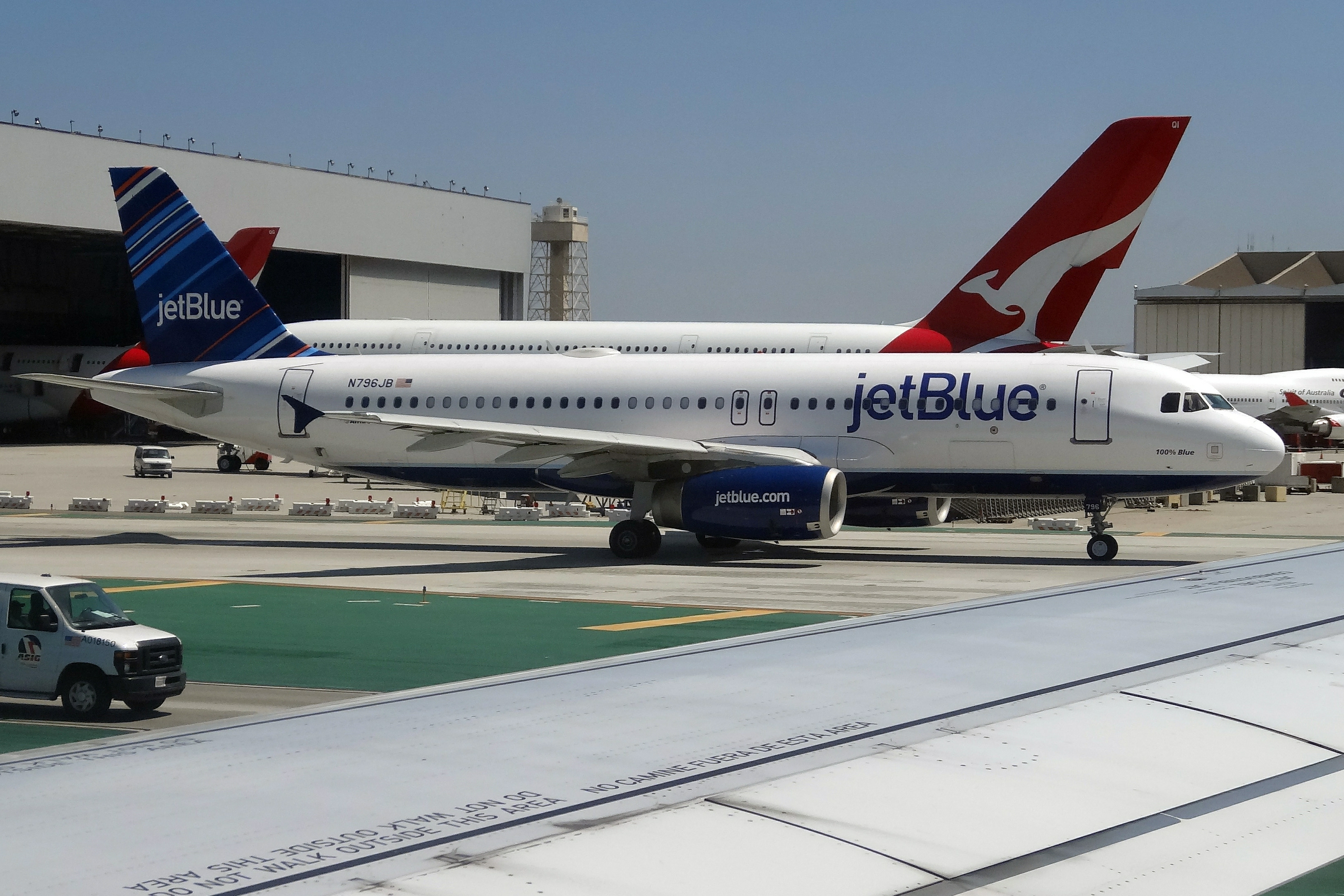
- N796JB, the aircraft involved, a year after the incident.

Incident
- Date: March 27, 2012
- Summary: In-flight crew incident followed by aircraft diversion
- Site: Near Rick Husband Amarillo International Airport, Amarillo, Texas, United States; 35.229°N 101.707°W

Aircraft
- Aircraft type: Airbus A320-232
- Aircraft name: 100% Blue
- Operator: JetBlue
- IATA flight No.: B6191
- ICAO flight No.: JBU191
- Call sign: JETBLUE 191
- Registration: N796JB
- Flight origin: John F. Kennedy International Airport, New York City, New York, United States
- Destination: McCarran International Airport, Las Vegas, Nevada, United States
- Occupants: 135
- Passengers: 129
- Crew: 6
- Fatalities: 0
- Injuries: 1
- Survivors: 135

JetBlue Flight 191 was a scheduled domestic commercial passenger flight from New York to Las Vegas, United States. On March 27, 2012, the Airbus A320 serving the route diverted to Amarillo, Texas, after the captain, suffering from an apparent mental breakdown, started behaving erratically and making increasingly incoherent and disturbing statements, prompting the first officer to lock him out of the cockpit and ask the passengers and crew to restrain him. There were no fatalities.

== Incident ==
JetBlue Flight 191 had departed John F. Kennedy International Airport in New York City and was en route to McCarran International Airport in Las Vegas when Captain Clayton Osbon (49) started acting erratically and ranting about terrorists and the September 11 attacks, apparently suffering from an unspecified mental breakdown. First Officer Jason Dowd (41) grew concerned when Osbon made comments such as "We need to take a leap of faith", "We're not going to Vegas", and "I can't be held responsible when this plane crashes." Osbon began giving what the first officer described as a sermon. Dowd became extremely concerned as Osbon's behaviour on the flight deck became more erratic and unusual; dimming his primary flight display, engine instruments and navigation display to the point they were almost totally switched off and unusable, yelling at air traffic controllers on frequency ordering them to be quiet, and admonishing Dowd for communicating with the "outside" when he responded to a concerned call from ATC.

Realizing Osbon was unfit for duty, Dowd suggested summoning a fellow off duty JetBlue captain, who was seated in the passenger cabin, to the cockpit. Osbon ignored him in response. A few seconds later, Osbon abruptly leapt from his seat, opened the cockpit door and ran into the forward lavatory, alarming the flight attendants as he wasn't following JetBlue protocol for pilots when leaving the cockpit. While Osbon was in the lavatory, Dowd requested the flight attendants summon the off duty pilot to the cockpit to assist him. When Osbon emerged from the lavatory, he was met by two alarmed flight attendants who asked if he was okay. Osbon then became aggressive, pushing the flight attendants aside and attempting to re-enter the cockpit, but was unable to do so as Dowd had completely locked the door, also preventing Osbon from gaining access to the flight deck using the emergency door code. Agitated that he was no longer able to enter the cockpit, Osbon stopped to speak to the flight attendants, where he mentioned "150 souls on board" several times.

He then walked through the cabin, stopping halfway to accost a male passenger and asked if he "had a problem with him [Osbon]". As he reached the back of the cabin, Osbon suddenly sprinted back to the cockpit door in a rage and began shouting to passengers about Jesus, Al-Qaeda, countries in the Middle East, and a possible bomb on board. He attempted to enter the cockpit several times, but was unsuccessful. Upon hearing Osbon trying to open the door, Dowd picked up the public address system and ordered passengers and flight attendants to restrain the captain. The four flight attendants on board and several passengers overpowered Osbon, where they pinned him to the galley floor and restrained him using seatbelt extenders.

An off-duty JetBlue pilot who was travelling as a passenger joined Dowd in the cockpit, and the plane landed about 20 minutes later at Rick Husband Amarillo International Airport in Amarillo, Texas. Osbon received medical treatment from Northwest Texas Healthcare System. He was arrested and charged with "interference with a flight crew."

The 49-year-old Osbon was suspended from work after being with JetBlue for 12 years. He had attended Carnegie Mellon University and graduated in 1987 from Nathaniel Hawthorne College, an aeronautics and aviation college located in New Hampshire.

== Trial and lawsuits ==
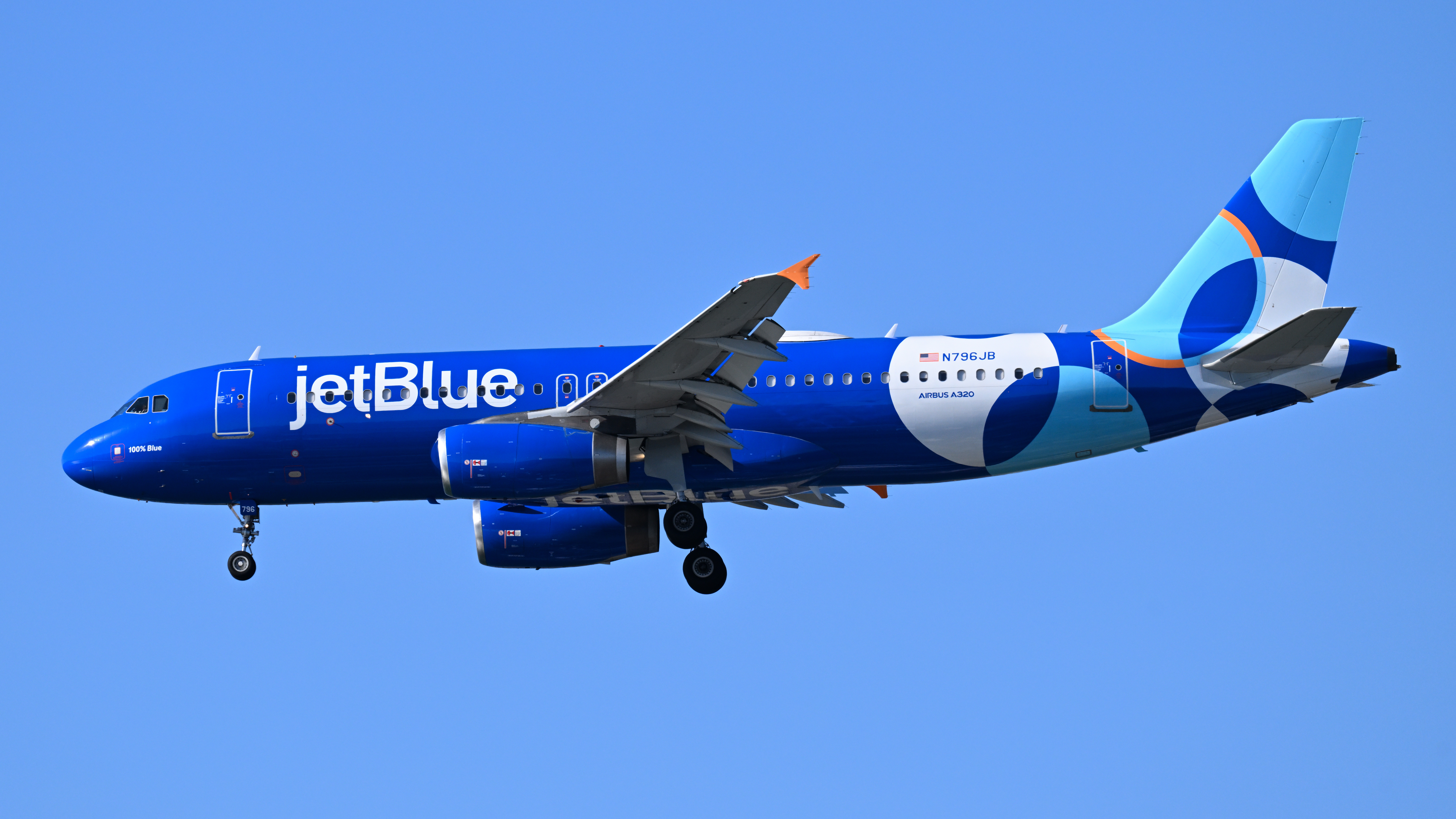
The aircraft involved, now seen in 2025

On Tuesday, July 3, 2012, Osbon was found not guilty by reason of insanity of the charge of interference with the flight crew by Judge Mary Lou Robinson of the District Court for the Northern District of Texas. Osbon was then ordered to be held pending a further investigation; he was then immediately transferred to a mental health facility in Fort Worth for additional treatment.

After Osbon was evaluated in a federal mental health facility in North Carolina, on November 9, 2012, Judge Robinson freed him under the provisions that he continue mental health treatment, follow a prescribed medication regime, and meet a variety of other conditions. Osbon must continue to be monitored by his probation officer for an undetermined amount of time. "This is a bad situation for you and your family, but you are very fortunate to have the type of immediate support you have," Robinson said. "Good Luck, Mr. Osbon."

In March 2015, Osbon filed a suit against JetBlue for $14.9 million, claiming that the airline did not ensure he was fit to fly, and endangered the lives of the crew and the passengers. The suit was filed three days after the Germanwings Flight 9525 crash, in which the co-pilot deliberately crashed the plane killing all the people aboard. The passenger suit was settled the following month; terms of the settlement were not disclosed to the public.

== Causes of illness ==
The cause of Osbon's mental breakdown remains unknown. Possibilities suggested included the onset of a psychotic disorder, a neurological event that compromised his brain function, or intoxication due to medication. In his March 2015 lawsuit against JetBlue, Osbon claimed the incident was caused by a complex partial brain seizure.

== In popular culture ==
The incident was featured in an episode of World's Worst Flights.

== See also ==
- List of air rage incidents
