= Aïn Kercha =

- Commune and town
- Coordinates: 35°55′N 6°42′E
- Country: Algeria
- Province: Oum El Bouaghi Province

Population (2008)
  - Total: 30,575
- Time zone: UTC+1 (CET)

Aïn Kercha is a town and commune in Oum El Bouaghi Province, Algeria.

== Localities of the commune ==
The commune of Aïn Kercha is composed of 10 localities:

- Centre Aïn Kercha
- Graa Saïda
- Ouled Ahmed Ben Sassi
- Oued Kercha
- Kercha Seghira
- El Karma
- Madjen Dahri
- Madjen El Guebli
- Dakhla
- Kessar Touadjène

== 2014 plane crash ==
On 11 February 2014, a C-130 Hercules transport aircraft of the Algerian Air Force crashed near Aïn Kercha, killing 77 of the 78 people on board.
