= Moises R. Espinosa Airport =

Airport in Masbate, Philippines

Moises R. Espinosa Airport Palupadan san Moises R. Espinosa Hulugpaan sang Moises R. Espinosa Paliparan ng Moises R. Espinosa
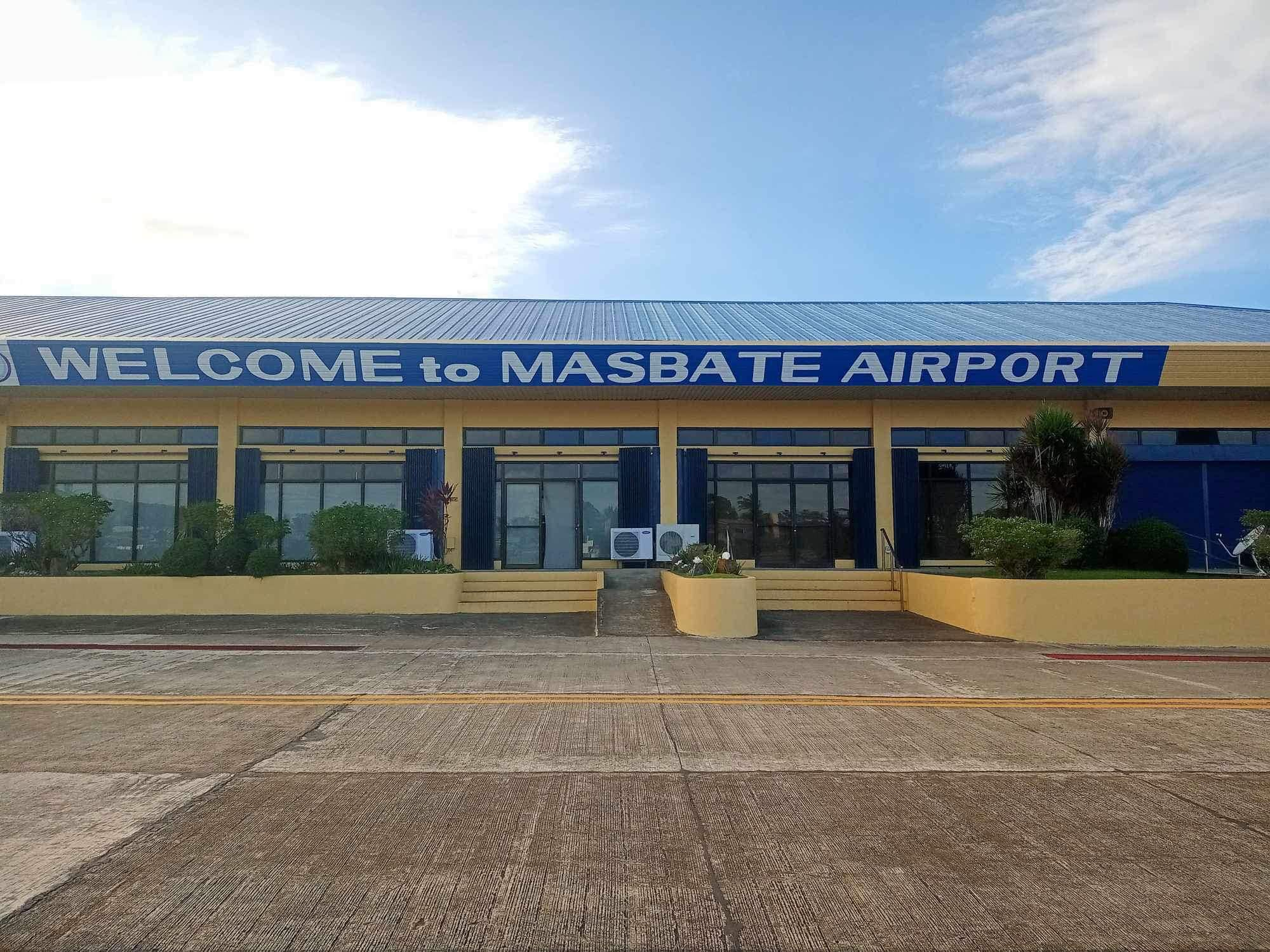
- IATA: MBT; ICAO: RPVJ

Summary
- Airport type: Public
- Operator: Civil Aviation Authority of the Philippines
- Serves: Masbate
- Elevation AMSL: 8 m (26 ft)
- Coordinates: 12°22′10″N 123°37′45″E

Map
- Location within Luzon Location within Philippines

Runways
Direction	Length		Surface
Direction	m	ft	Surface
04/22	1,500	4,921	Asphalt/concrete

Statistics (2017)
- Passengers: 65,627
- Aircraft movements: 1,542
- Cargo movement (in kgs): 62,266
- Source: Statistics from eFOI

Moises R. Espinosa Airport (IATA: MBT, ICAO: RPVJ), also known as Masbate Airport, is the airport serving the general area of Masbate City, located in the province of Masbate in the Philippines. It is named for Moises R. Espinosa Sr., a former Representative of Masbate who was assassinated at the airport on March 17, 1989.

The airport is classified as a Class 2 principal (minor domestic) airport by the Civil Aviation Authority of the Philippines, a body of the Department of Transportation that is responsible for the operations of not only this airport but also of all other airports in the Philippines except the major international airports.

The airport terminal was severely damaged by Typhoon Bualoi (Opong) in September 2025.

== Future expansion ==
Moises R. Espinosa Airport underwent a renovation of its runway and terminal building between 2006 and 2008. The Civil Aviation Authority of the Philippines plans to improve aviation facilities to become an airport that will welcome tourism in the province.

== Incidents and accidents ==
- On January 2, 2008, Asian Spirit Flight 321, an NAMC YS-11 on a flight from Manila, overshot Runway 21 of the airport at 7:30 a.m. while landing, collapsing the right main landing gear and damaging the starboard engine. None of the 47 passengers and crew on board were seriously injured.
- On August 18, 2012, a chartered Piper PA-34 Seneca crashed at sea around 300 meters (980 ft) short of the runway. The aircraft was carrying Jesse Robredo, the Secretary of the Interior and Local Government, his aide and two pilots. The flight, originating from Cebu, was bound for Naga, Camarines Sur when its crew declared an emergency and requested priority landing at the airport. Robredo and the two pilots died in the crash, while his aide was rescued with only minor injuries.

== Airlines and destinations ==
Airlines	Destinations
Cebgo	Cebu, Clark

== See also ==
- List of airports in the Philippines
