= Ron Akana =

American flight attendant (1928–2025)

- Born: September 8, 1928; Honolulu, Territory of Hawaii, U.S.
- Died: July 29, 2025 (aged 96); Colorado, U.S.
- Occupation: Flight attendant
- Years active: 1949–2012
- Employer: United Airlines
- Known for: World's longest-serving flight attendant
- Children: 1

Ronald Byrd Akana (September 8, 1928 – July 29, 2025) was an American flight attendant who spent 63 years working as cabin crew for United Airlines (UA) and who logged an estimated 200 million airmiles. He was the world's longest serving flight attendant and was admitted to The Guinness Book of Records.

== Career ==
Akana, aged 21, applied to a local newspaper ad in 1949 with United Airlines for a steward position. His reason to apply as a flight steward was that "[…] it meant getting to the mainland, which was a huge deal in those days." At this time Akana was still a student at the University of Hawaii. After joining UA he started flying to the mainland on Boeing Stratocruiser. His time working for UA was only interrupted by a two-year conscription, where he served in the Korean War. In August 2012, after 63 years of service, Akana retired after a flight from Denver to Kauai. By that time he had accumulated 200 million airmiles.

== Personal life and death ==
Akana was born in Honolulu on September 8, 1928. His wife was also a flight attendant, but had to quit after marriage. His daughter Kaleo also pursued a career as a flight attendant with United Airlines.

Akana died in Colorado on July 29, 2025, at the age of 96.
