= Matevž Lenarčič =

Slovenian alpinist, aviator and photograph

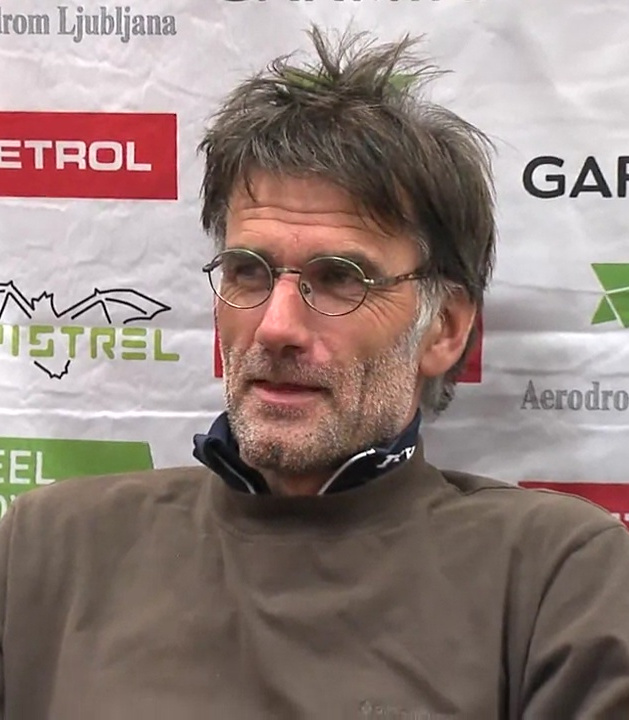
Matevž Lenarčič in 2012

Matevž Lenarčič is an extreme light aircraft pilot from Slovenia. He is also an alpinist, paraglider, environmentalist, and a photographer. He has climbed all over the world and among others reached the top of 8051m Broad Peak in Himalaya and climbed extreme routes in Patagonia, like Fitz Roy. He is author of eleven books (nature, photography, climbing and flying), some of them awarded and translated in several languages. He is also founder and director of Aerovizija d.o.o.

Besides "normal" flying in Europe, mostly for aerial business purposes (vertical and oblique photography), he has also made some extreme flights:

- Worldtrannsiberia 2002
- Around The Only World 2004
- Africa – Valley of Life 2005
- The Alps – A Bird's Eye View 2006–2009: 28,000 kilometres (17,000 mi) over 8 countries incl. Russia
- 38,000 kilometres (24,000 mi) crossing 23 countries
- 17,000 kilometres (11,000 mi) over 13 countries
- 60,000 kilometres (37,000 mi) all over the Alps

He has flown for more than 3500 hours all over the world, mostly with his ultra light motor glider and other single engine aircraft. He holds both a private pilot license with an instrument flight rules rating and night qualification, and an ultralight pilot license.

== Records ==
- Official national speed record Around the World Eastbound
- Unofficial world speed record Around the World Eastbound
- 2nd place national competition RAL2 2005
- Active member (Supervisory Board) AOPA Slovenija
- Member AOPA America
- Member EAA America (Experimental Aircraft Association)
- Aero club Member AK Prlek and Društvo Zgornjesavinjskih letalcev
- Aviator of the Year; Flightglobal Achievement Awards 2013
