= Talodi =

Talodi تلودي
- Town
- Location in southern Sudan
- Coordinates: 10°38′11″N 30°22′47″E
- Country: Sudan
- State: South Kordofan

Talodi (Arabic: تلودي) is a small town in the Nuba Mountains, and a district of South Kordofan state, in southern Sudan. The town is nearly 650 km (406 miles) southwest of Khartoum. Its name is from the Talodi people of the area who speak the Talodi language.

Talodi District, in South Kordofan state (pre-2005 map).

A British garrison was located in Talodi during the colonial period, and an independence outbreak occurred in 1906.

The 2012 Sudan Antonov An-26 crash, which killed 32 people on 19 August 2012, took place near the town.
